= Prehistoric Cornwall =

Period of Cornish history from c. 225,000 years ago until c. 43 CE

The prehistory of Cornwall spans an extensive timeframe, beginning with the earliest evidence for archaic human presence in Cornwall c. 225,000 years ago and extending to the Roman conquest of Britain in 43 CE. During this period, which encompasses the Palaeolithic, Mesolithic, Neolithic, Bronze Age, and Iron Age, Cornwall transformed from a sparsely populated hunter-gatherer society reliant on rudimentary stone tools to an agricultural society characterized by developed metallurgical practices, expansive trade networks, and increasingly complex social structures.

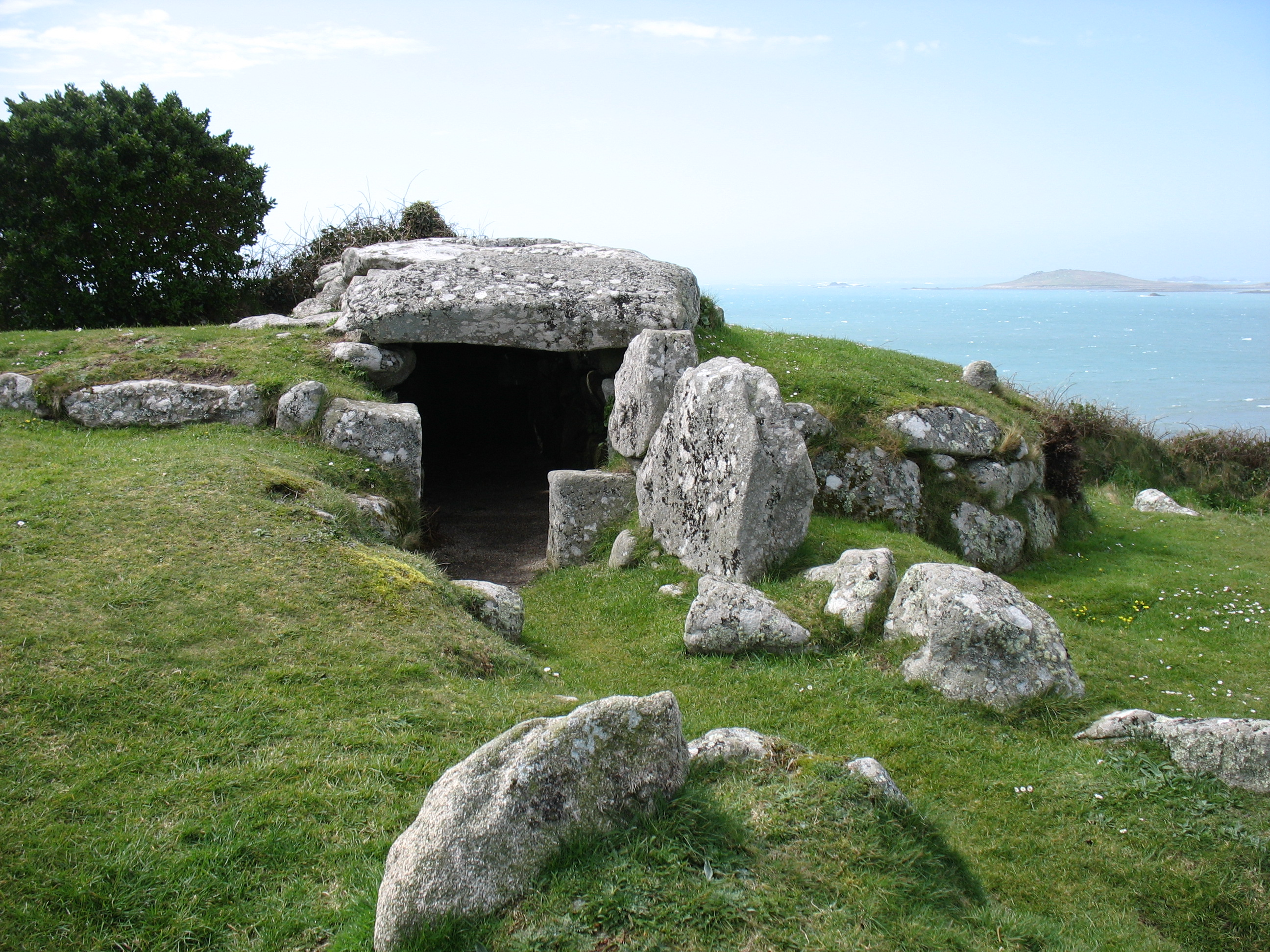
Bant's Carn, St Mary's, Isles of Scilly. One of the numerous entrance graves found in Scilly and West Penwith.

During the Palaeolithic era, spanning from c. 225,000 to c. 10,000 years ago, traces of human occupation include lithic fragments and tools such as handaxes, providing limited insights into early and perhaps only intermittent human activity in Cornwall. The subsequent Mesolithic period, from c. 10,000–4000 BCE, provides more substantial evidence of a permanent human presence. This era is characterized by advances in stone tool technology that allowed the Mesolithic hunter-gatherer population of Cornwall to exploit the newly formed woodland environment and additional marine and freshwater resources that resulted from the warmer temperatures and rising sea levels of the Holocene following the Last Glacial Maximum.

The Neolithic era, c. 4000–2400 BCE, saw significant cultural developments, including the introduction of the earliest pottery, limited agriculture, and the construction of megalithic monuments. Early farming in Cornwall primarily focused on animal husbandry, with only minimal crop cultivation. Cornish greenstone was used to manufacture stone axes, which were widely exported across Britain, while gabbroic clay from the Lizard was used extensively for ceramic production. In exchange, flint and axes were imported from other parts of Britain, along with jadeite axes from the European mainland.

The Bronze Age, c. 2400–800 BCE, marked the emergence of metalworking, with bronze utilized to manufacture tools, weapons, and ornaments. Megalithic monument construction reached its peak in the Early Bronze Age, while Cornwall's natural resources, particularly tin, gold, and gabbroic clay, played an important role in regional and European trade networks. Large numbers of roundhouse villages were built across Cornwall, and by the Middle Bronze Age the region had become a fully agricultural society.

The Iron Age, c. 800 BCE – 43 CE, witnessed further social and technological developments, together with climatic changes that resulted in colder and wetter conditions for much of this period. Iron replaced bronze as the metal used in tool and weapon manufacture, and large numbers of fortified sites like rounds, hillforts, and cliff castles, which perhaps served as local power centres, were built by Cornwall's growing population. The arrival of the Romans in 43 CE traditionally marks the conclusion of the prehistoric period in Cornwall.

== Palaeolithic (c. 700,000–10,000 BP) ==
=== Map ===
Palaeolithic sites in Cornwall

Findspot
Lithic scatter
Lithic working site

=== Chronology and overview ===
Chronology
Lower Palaeolithic	c. 700,000–250,000 BP
Middle Palaeolithic	c. 250,000–40,000 BP
Upper Palaeolithic	c. 40,000–10,000 BP

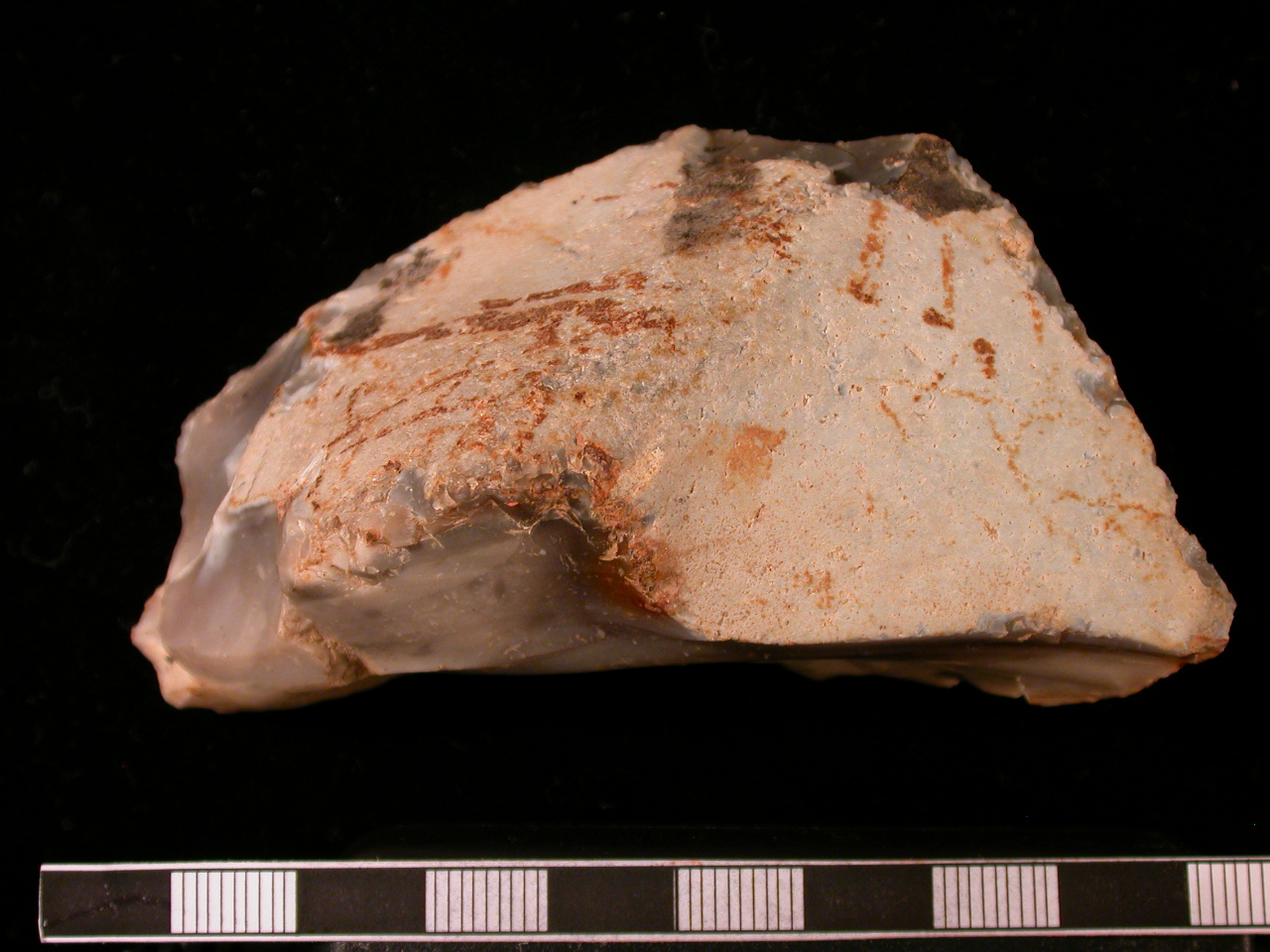
Palaeolithic side scraper (dorsal), c. 500,000 BCE, from Paul

The Palaeolithic in Britain spans the period from the earliest archaic human presence in Britain, from at least 780,000 years ago, to the beginning of the Mesolithic, approximately 10,000 years ago. The Palaeolithic archaeological period falls within the Pleistocene geological epoch, which has a complex history of changing climatic conditions and fluctuating sea levels over an extensive period.

During the Last Glacial Maximum human populations abandoned Britain, but by 16,000 years ago most of Southern Britain was again free from ice, and humans returned to Southwestern Britain shortly after, c. 15,500 BP. Some evidence, such as the erratic boulders found on Cornwall's north and south coasts, may suggest the earlier presence of glacial ice in Cornwall. Ancient DNA research indicates that two distinct populations inhabited Britain in the Late Glacial Period: one group related to the c. 15,000 year old Goyet-Q2 individual from the Goyet Caves in Belgium, believed to have expanded from a Southwest European refugium, and a second group related to the c. 14,000 year old Western Hunter-Gatherer individual from Villabruna, Italy, who exhibited greater affinity to Near Eastern populations. This second ancestry profile is predominant in British Mesolithic individuals.

Direct evidence for Palaeolithic human presence in Cornwall is limited, suggesting only intermittent activity. Sites may have been lost due to subsequent sea level rises and erosion, with the absence of identified cave or rock shelters possibly attributable to insufficient examination of potential upland shelters. The few identified Palaeolithic findspots in Cornwall consist predominantly of surface stone scatters, along with a few examples of stone tools. Most of these are concentrated in the far south west. Booby's Bay, near Trevose Head on the north coast, has been interpreted as the possible site of an Upper Palaeolithic community, with evidence for flintworking and a hearth. Notable finds include an Upper Palaeolithic Acheulian flint handaxe found at Lower Leha, St Buryan potentially dating to around 200,000–225,000 BCE, and a Middle Palaeolithic Levallois core implement at Higher Polcoverack Farm, St Keverne. Other discoveries include hand axes from Constantine, Grade-Ruan, and Coverack, as well as broken handaxes from Ladock and Lanhydrock. At Landewednack, multiple findspots yielded a complete handaxe, a broken handaxe, a handaxe fragment, and an incomplete biface.

The only possible evidence for Upper Palaeolithic human activity in the Isles of Scilly, which was at the time still connected to the mainland, consists of a curved-backed 'penknife' point blade, assuming this object can be correctly assigned to this period.

== Mesolithic (c. 9660–4000 BCE) ==
=== Chronology and overview ===
Chronology
Early Mesolithic	c. 10,000–8,500 BP (9660–7500 BCE)
Late Mesolithic	c. 8,500–5,500 BP (7500–4000 BCE)

The Mesolithic, which follows the Upper Palaeolithic and ends with the introduction of farming, had a warmer climate that resulted in rising sea and river levels and the expansion of woodland, as well as significant changes in stone tool technology. In contrast with the preceding Palaeolithic period, there is credible evidence for a permanent human presence in Cornwall during the Mesolithic. Semi-nomadic hunter gatherers, who crafted tools from stone and probably other organic materials, sustained themselves through seasonal hunting, fishing and gathering. There is an apparent preference for coastal areas, which were exploited for their plentiful food resources.

=== Environment ===
The onset of the Mesolithic period coincides with the end of the Late Glacial Period and the onset of the Holocene, a period of milder climatic conditions following the Last Glacial Maximum. The earlier Mesolithic, up to c. 7,500 BP, was a period of relatively sudden change, which was followed by a more stable period. The warmer temperatures of the Early Mesolithic led to a rapid rise in sea levels, resulting in significant changes to the shape of the Cornish coastline, a decrease in the total land area, and the replacement of cold-adapted flora and fauna with other species. During this period there was an expansion of grasslands and oak, hazel, birch, and elm woodlands were established.

Overall, studies suggest a significant decline of tree cover on Bodmin Moor and the lowland hills and valleys around the mid-6th millennium BCE, resulting in a sparsely wooded environment and the expansion of open grasslands. The extent to which this environment was shaped by climatic factors or human activity is unclear.

In Scilly, the Mesolithic was characterized by extensive tree cover, consisting mostly of oak, hazel, and birch that persisted into the early Neolithic.

=== Material culture ===
==== Sites ====
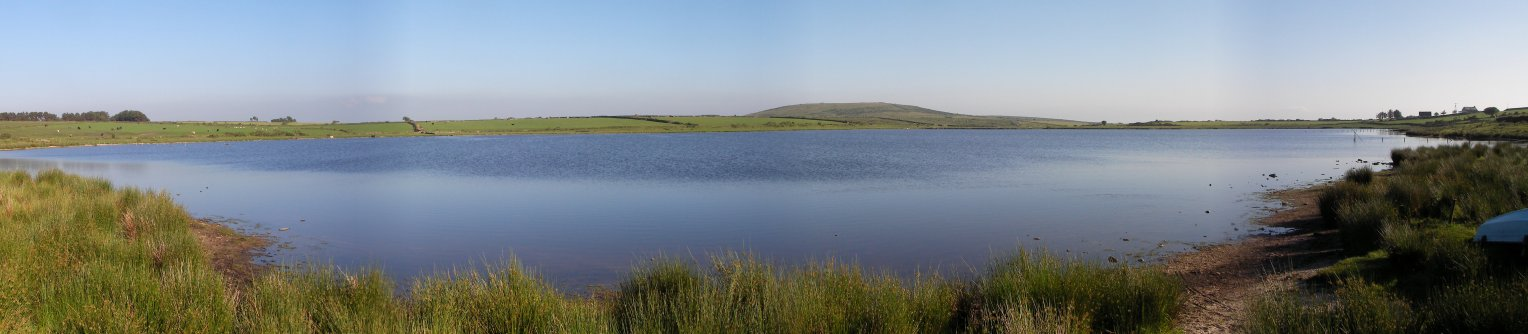
Dozmary Pool, a well-known Cornish Mesolithic site

Findspots and sites are particularly concentrated in coastal areas, which attracted Mesolithic people due to the abundant marine food resources. There is an apparent preference for occupation of the north coast, which may be the result of the differential effects of erosion making these sites more archaeologically visible. Large lithic assemblages have also been found at some lowland sites on the south coast. Temporary camps and sites are also found along rivers, on moorland, and around the moorland-lowland ecotone. During the later Mesolithic period sites were located on terraces or low ridges, possibly to provide protection from humans or animals. Late Mesolithic sites are typically larger than earlier Mesolithic sites, suggesting that they were occupied by larger populations. One explanation for this trend may be the rising sea levels, which reduced the available land area, and may have led to a concentration of resources.

The absence of surviving structures and organic materials has hindered conclusive interpretations of the functions of Mesolithic sites. Upland sites on Bodmin Moor, such as Dozmary Pool, Colliford Reservoir, and Butterstor, are believed to have been temporary or semi-permanent summer deer hunting or butchery sites. Similarly, clifftop sites on the north coast, as well as Croft Pascoe on the Lizard, have also been interpreted as seasonal hunting sites. In contrast, lowland sites such as Poldowrian and Windmill Farm, both on the Lizard, are believed to have functioned as base camps. The Trevose Head area, which would have been inland in the early Mesolithic, may have been a permanent settlement from which people could exploit both coastal and inland resources.

Significant lithic assemblages, indicative of extensive stone tool production, are found at Poldowrian, Windmill Farm, Butterstor, and North Cliffs. At Dozmary Pool, Bodmin Moor's only permanent lake, thousands of flint scrapers have been found, suggesting that it may have been a hide processing site. More than twenty Mesolithic sites have been found in the Gwithian area, yielding thousands of items including hundreds of bevelled pebbles, which may have been scrapers for preparing seal hides. The presence of a large number of what have been interpreted as seal gastroliths may indicate additional Late Mesolithic seal processing at North Cliffs, Camborne.

The earliest evidence for the settlement of Scilly, apart from the possible Upper Palaeolithic find, dates to the early Mesolithic. Limited evidence, including a microlith and a pebble hammer, suggests that Scilly was probably visited seasonally by hunter-gatherers from the mainland. A Mesolithic flintworking site has been identified at Old Town Quay, St Martin's.

==== Tools ====
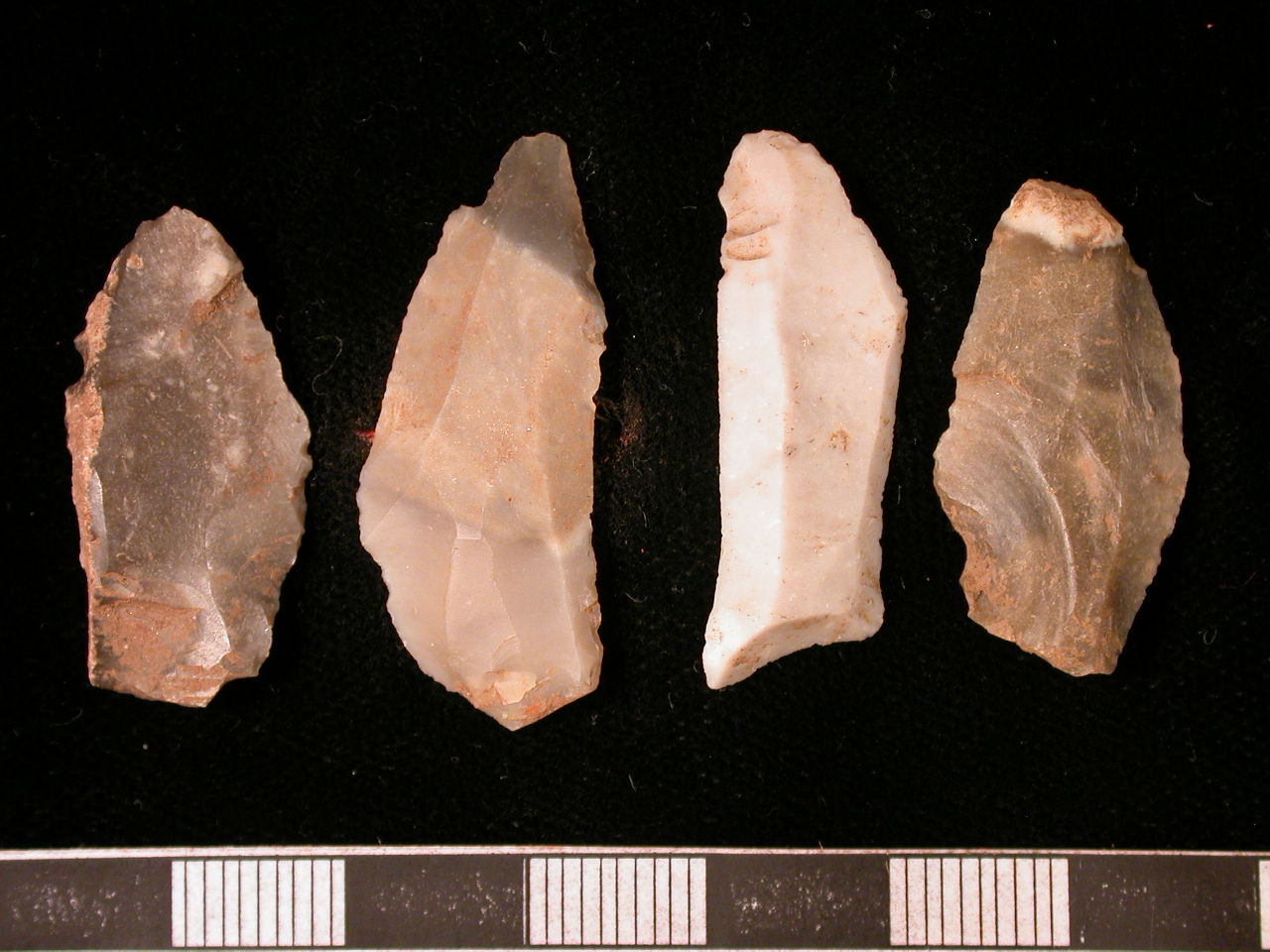
Microlithic bladelets, c. 8300–6500 BCE, St. Buryan

The Mesolithic is characterized by significant changes in stone tool technology. Tools were manufactured by the prepared-core technique, breaking flint or chert beach pebbles with hammerstones to produce bladelets. A wide variety of tools were made and used at Cornish Mesolithic sites, including hammerstones, stone anvils, scrapers, choppers, bevelled pebble tools, arrow tip microliths, awls, burins, axes, pickaxes, and backed blades.

Microliths are the most common find at Mesolithic sites. The introduction of the use of stone microliths as arrowheads was a significant development, as arrows were a useful tool for hunting the comparatively smaller game of the newly formed woodland environment. Petit tranchet arrowheads for hunting birds are found at Dozmary Pool, Crowdy Marsh, and Davidstow Moor

Pebble hammers may have been used as nutcrackers or as weights. Burins were used on bone and antler. Scrapers were used to work wood, bone, antler and hides, and awls were used as piercing tools to make clothes. Bevelled pebbles, previously thought to be tools for harvesting limpets, have more recently been interpreted as scrapers for preparing seal skins to make coracles.

The primary source of flint and chert for Cornish Mesolithic tools was beach pebbles originating from the Haig Fras. Additional sources may have included chert from Portland, Dorset, and high quality black flint from Beer Head, Devon.

While organic materials such as bone, antler, plant fibres, wood, hide, and shell have not been preserved due to Cornwall's acidic soils, they probably comprised a substantial portion of Mesolithic material culture.

Engraved pebbles, incised with parallel lines, have been found at Trevose Head and Poldowrian. Intentionally decorated pebbles from the Mesolithic are very rare in Britain.

=== Ritual ===
Some archaeologists have suggested that later Mesolithic communities in Cornwall participated in rituals that demonstrated a strong connection to their surroundings, such as deposition of charcoal or quartz into pits. Quartz may have been perceived as having magical properties by Mesolithic people, and this belief may have been passed down into the later Neolithic and Bronze Age periods, when more extensive evidence of quartz depositions is found.

Mesolithic populations may have attached symbolic or ritual significance to natural features such as lakes, springs, marshes, and the tors that remained culturally significant to people in Cornwall throughout the prehistoric period.

Mesolithic burial sites are rare throughout Britain, and none are known in Cornwall. Mesolithic people may have practised excarnation as a funerary ritual.

Caradoc Peters speculates that in the late Mesolithic period people may have started to perceive themselves as separate from nature, rather than an integral part of it, and used rituals in an attempt to appease the natural world.

=== Subsistence ===
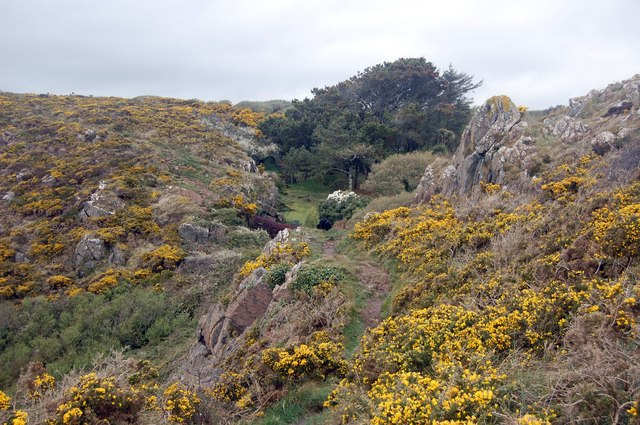
Poldowrian, Lizard, site of a Mesolithic hunting, gathering, and fishing community

Evidence suggests that Mesolithic Cornwall was inhabited by a significant population of semi-nomadic hunter-gatherers who sustained themselves through hunting, fishing, and gathering by exploiting coastal, estuarine, riverine, and woodland environments. Some sites, such as Poldowrian and Windmill Farm, indicate the presence of large groups of people, suggesting comparatively high food availability in these areas.

The Mesolithic diet probably consisted of a wide variety of foods including fish, shellfish, seaweed, seals, birds, deer, wild pigs, aurochs, nuts, seeds, fruits, vegetables, and fungi. Middens discovered at Trevelgue Head suggest that shellfish stew may have been a staple in the inhabitants' diet.

A common 'Southwest British economic area' may have existed, characterized by shared seasonal movement patterns. This seasonal cycle may have consisted of fishing in spring and summer, animal herding and hunting in the uplands in late summer, fishing in autumn and early winter, and hunting in the woodlands in late winter and early spring.

Limited evidence suggests that woodland may have been intentionally cleared by burning to manage mammal populations for hunting and encourage hazel growth to improve nut harvests. Additionally red deer may have been introduced to Scilly in the Mesolithic period, with woodland intentionally burned to encourage growth of willow shoots for the deer to feed on.

=== Trade and cultural links ===
Cornwall's geographical location, surrounded by the Atlantic Ocean on the north and west and the English Channel on the south, with the Tamar separating it from the rest of southern Britain, has led to a reliance on maritime trade. Rising sea levels in the Mesolithic produced a high ratio of coast to land, along with larger rivers, which likely facilitated travel by bark or animal skin canoes and perhaps expedited social change.

By the 5th millennium BCE, long-distance maritime routes between the Isles of Scilly, Cornwall, Ireland, and northern Britain had probably been established. Flint from Beer and chert from Portland were regularly exchanged with groups in Cornwall, perhaps traded for pebble hammers from the Carbis Bay area. Mesolithic flint axes found in Cornwall may occasionally have been imported from distant regions.

=== Genetics ===
Individuals carrying Villabruna (Western Hunter-Gatherer) ancestry are found in Britain from around 12,000 BP, before the Mesolithic. All British Mesolithic individuals so far studied, with the exception of Cheddar Man, can be modelled entirely with this component without the need for any of the additional Goyet-Q2 component that was predominant in some earlier Palaeolithic individuals, although two-source models, in which Villabruna-related ancestry is still predominant, are also possible. Villabruna ancestry is found in individuals throughout the Mesolithic, but is eventually almost completely replaced by populations carrying Early European Farmer ancestry, who arrived in Britain at the beginning of the Neolithic.

== Neolithic (c. 4000–2400 BCE) ==
=== Chronology ===
Chronology
Early Neolithic	c. 4000–3400 BCE
Middle Neolithic	c. 3400–3000 BCE
Late Neolithic	c. 3000–2400 BCE

The Neolithic revolution was a major turning point in human prehistory, when societies transitioned from hunter-gatherer societies to settled farming communities. Originating in the Middle East, the Neolithic cultural package, which included domesticated plants and animals, pottery, and other technologies, spread to the Aegean and Eastern Marmara regions and then to Europe via the Mediterranean Sea and the Danube river. The Neolithic reached Britain c. 4000 BCE, probably spreading from the Thames Estuary to the South West Peninsula within around 100 years. Ancient DNA studies suggest that agriculture was introduced to Britain by migrating Early European Farmer groups bringing their Neolithic lifestyle from the European mainland, and argue against the competing hypothesis that indigenous British hunter-gatherers became farmers.

Features of the Neolithic in Cornwall include the introduction of limited agriculture, the emergence of ceramics, stone axe production, and the construction of distinctive structures and monuments such as tor enclosures and chambered tombs. Economic and ritual practices in Neolithic Cornwall show influence from neighbouring fully agricultural societies elsewhere in Southern Britain.

=== Environment ===
The Neolithic coincides with the Middle Holocene, a period of slower sea level rises compared to the Early Holocene. Nevertheless, sea level rose by several metres during the Neolithic, further changing the south west coastline and submerging large areas of forest. Higher sea levels resulted in decreased river slopes, which in combination with expanding woodlands resulted in the formation of meandering or anastamosing river beds. Ombrogenous bogs developed on Bodmin Moor during the Middle Holocene.

At the beginning of the Neolithic, oak and hazel woodland was predominant. Evidence suggests that small-scale woodland clearance began sometime after 4000 BCE. Further lowland elm woodland decline, attributed to human activity, and the expansion of grasslands is dated to c. 3640–3370 BCE.

=== Material culture ===
==== Settlements ====
Neolithic sites in Cornwall are typically classified as either seasonal camps or hilltop enclosures. Seasonal camps were used for activities such as fishing, hunting, gathering, or herding, while hilltop enclosures may have served as sacred sites for rituals or the exchange of goods. Neolithic sites are more often found inland compared to Mesolithic, where they are more commonly found near coasts, suggesting a shift from a mainly marine diet to more terrestrial food. On Bodmin Moor, hilltop sites were preferred over riversides.

Buildings

The earliest limited evidence for domestic structures in Cornwall dates to the Neolithic. This includes the remains of an early Neolithic longhouse and a circular structure at Penhale, as well as the remains of insubstantial and probably temporary domestic structures at the Helman Tor and Carn Brea tor enclosures.

==== Monuments ====
In Northwest Europe, Britain, and Scandinavia, where Mesolithic communities persisted for a relatively long time, large stone monuments (megaliths) were constructed in the Neolithic for ceremonial or other purposes. In Cornwall, megalithic structures such as menhirs, stone rows, and stone circles, as well as other distinctive monument forms such as tor enclosures, simple tombs, portal dolmens, and long mounds, were built from the early Neolithic until the first millennium BCE.

Tor enclosures

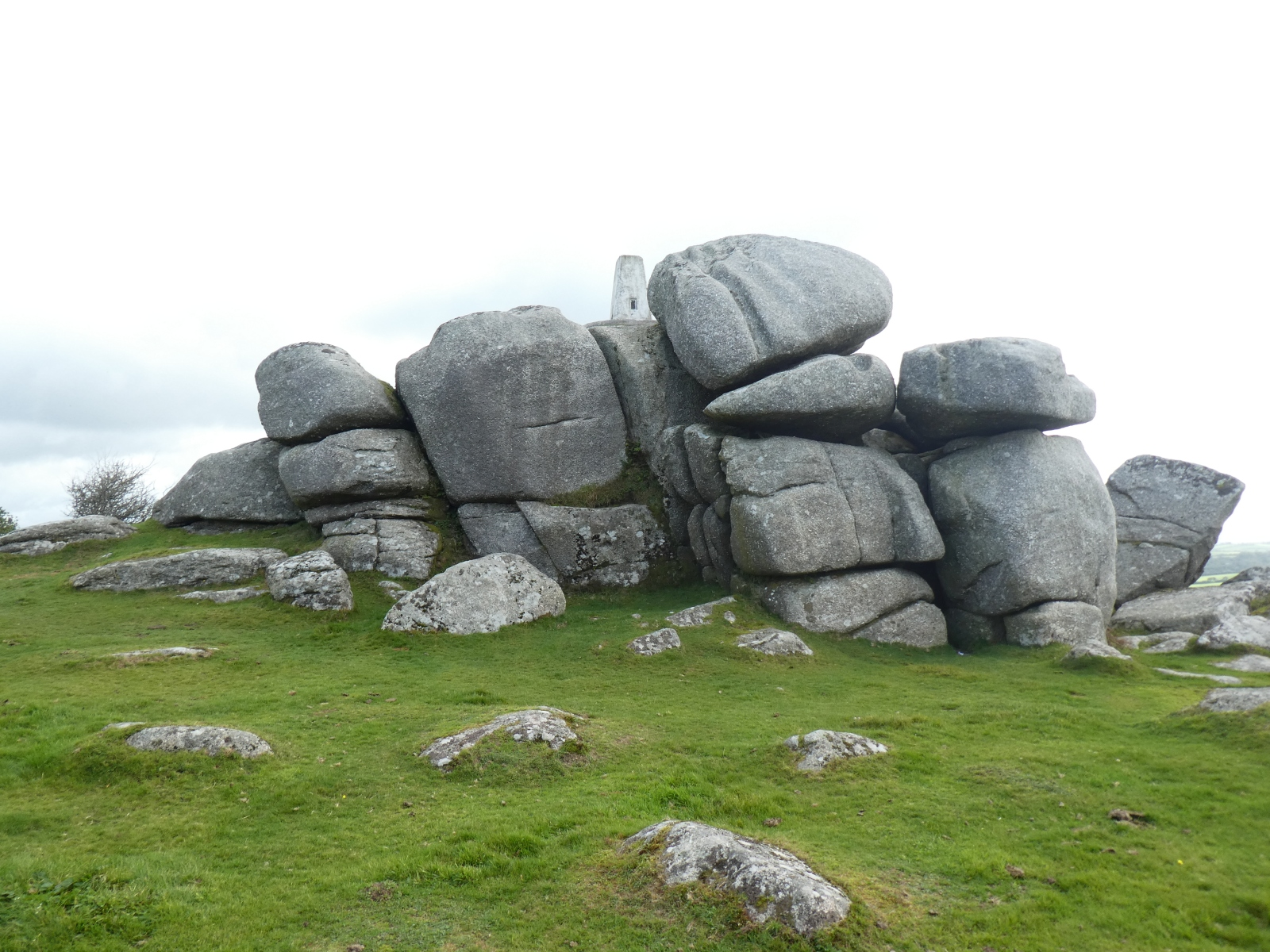
Helman Tor, a Neolithic tor enclosure

Tor enclosures are large monuments surrounded by stone walls that incorporate natural granite outcrops (tors). The best-known examples are Carn Brea and Helman Tor, both dated to the Neolithic. While tor enclosures have been interpreted as permanent defended agricultural settlements and manufacturing centres, evidence for substantial domestic structures or food processing tools at this type of site is limited. Alternative purposes of tor enclosures have been proposed, including serving as sites for the exchange of resources such as greenstone axes and ceramics, or as locations of regular gatherings for ceremonies such as death rites, excarnation, or marriages.

At Carn Brea, evidence for fire damage to buildings followed by an apparent rapid abandonment of the enclosure, along with the discovery of hundreds of leaf-shaped flint arrowheads, have been interpreted as evidence for an attack on this site by a large group of archers. This may reflect a wider trend of attacks on Neolithic enclosures across Southern Britain.

On Scilly, terraced hillsides were built instead of the tor enclosures found on the mainland.

Tombs

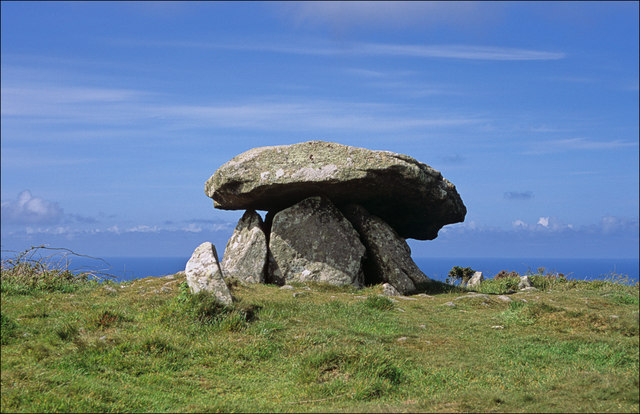
Chûn Quoit, a Neolithic chamber tomb

Chambered tombs feature a large burial chamber which was typically used for interring multiple individuals over an extended period. These monuments, dating to the early Neolithic, are usually associated with cremation. Examples include the simple chambered tombs of Chûn, Mulfra, and Grumbla, as well as portal dolmens at Zennor (c. 3350–3000 BCE), Trevethy, and Pawton, along with unclassified examples like Sperris (c. 3600–3500 BCE), Lanyon, and Lesquite. Chambered tombs were probably monuments dedicated to the dead, with the presence of cremated human bone inside the Zennor and Sperris quoits indicating that these structures were used for funerary rituals.

Propped stones, or 'pseudo-quoits', consisting of a large stone raised up on smaller stones atop a tor, may date to the 3rd or 4th millennium BCE. Solar alignments have been suggested for some of these structures, such as the example at Leskernick on Bodmin Moor. Alternatively, propped stones may have served to indicate the route of seasonal animal migrations.

A small number of long mounds, mainly located in the east of Cornwall, probably date to the early Neolithic.

Other monuments

Three late Neolithic class I henges are found at Castilly, Castlewich, and the Stripple Stones.

Embanked avenues, consisting of two parallel banks of stone, include the 55-metre-long monument at Craddock Moor, possibly dating to the middle Neolithic. These structures may be related to the cursus monuments found elsewhere in Britain and Ireland.

While some Cornish stone circles may date to the late Neolithic, they are mostly dated to the Bronze Age.

==== Pottery ====
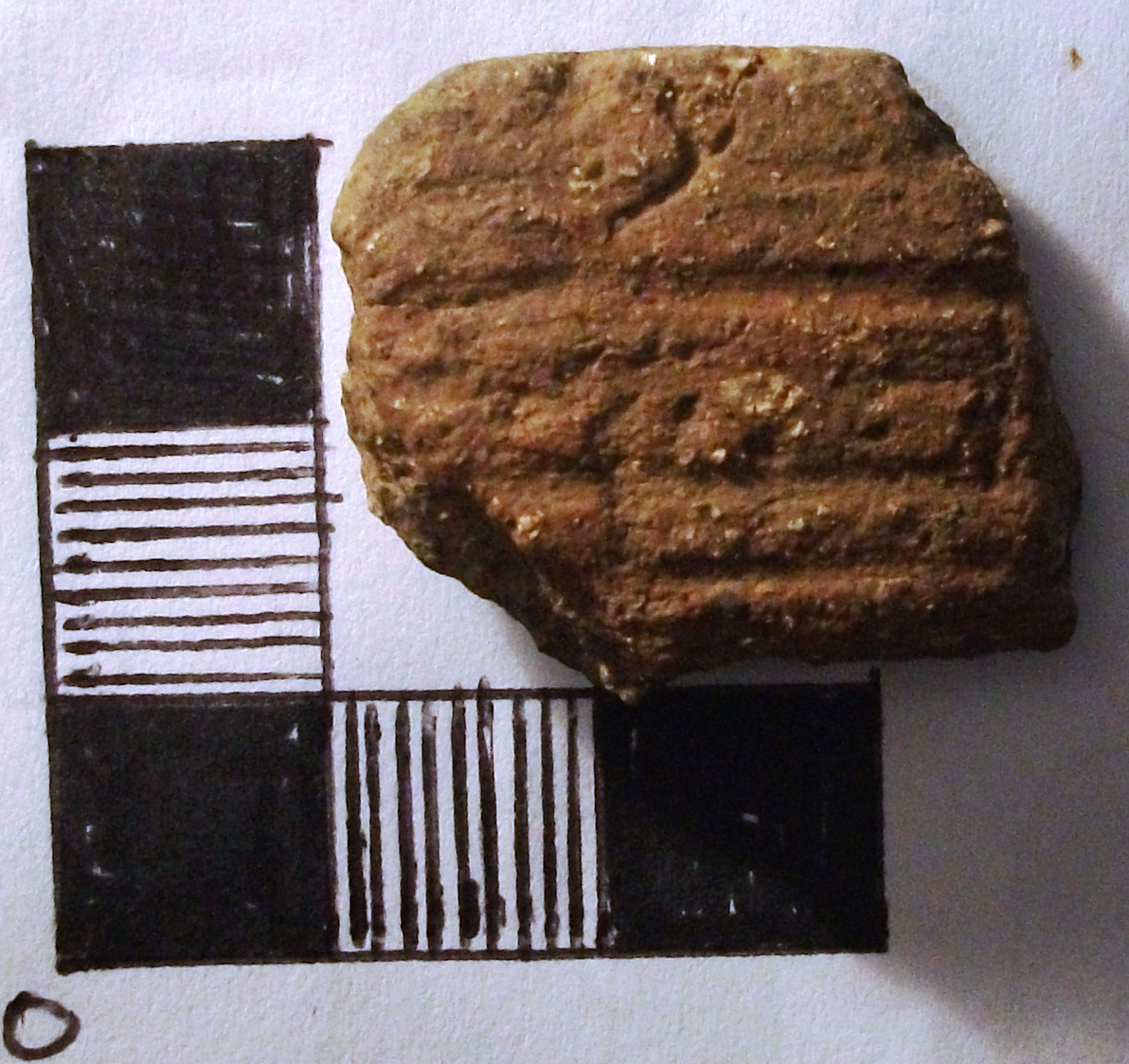
Cornish Grooved Ware, c. 2900–2400 BCE; the feldspar grits indicate that this piece was made with gabbroic clay from the Lizard

Extrusions of gabbro, a phaneritic igneous rock, are found on parts of the Lizard Peninsula, including a small area near Zoar where the largest outcrop of gabbro in Britain is found. The decay of these extrusions results in the formation of gabbroic clay, which is rich in feldspar, olivines, and other minerals. This allows pottery made from this clay to be successfully fired in a bonfire without the need for a kiln. Although it is more difficult to work with compared to other clay types it can still be crafted into high-quality ceramics.

Gabbroic clays were a valuable resource for the manufacture of ceramics in Cornwall from the early Neolithic until around the 8th century CE. Unlike most prehistoric pottery, which was typically produced from local clay sources, Cornish gabbroic pottery and clay was distributed across most of Southern Britain from the Early Neolithic, probably through trade networks. The enduring use of gabbroic clay in Cornwall suggests that it may have had some sort of special significance for its users, possibly linked to regional identity.

In addition to gabbroic fabrics, other types of clay were also used locally in the Neolithic. Ceramics made from local granitic clays, for example, have been found in Scilly, in West Penwith, and at Trevelgue Head.

The first ceramics in Cornwall date to c. 4000 BCE, with the emergence of the Hembury or Southwestern Ware style that is found in Cornwall until c. 3350 BCE. Hembury Ware, found throughout the Southwest, is generally undecorated, and is characterized by round-based, wide-mouthed bowls, often with lugs. Most Hembury Ware was made using gabbroic clay from the Lizard. Hembury Ware vessels could have been prestige items that were crafted by specialist potters and then exchanged or traded across a large area of southern Britain. Carinated Bowls, although infrequent finds in Cornwall, are found in unusually large numbers at Carn Brea, where they were made from gabbroic fabric, and at a few other sites where they were made from a blend of gabbroic and local clays.

During the mid to late Neolithic (c. 2900–2200 BCE), the flat-based Grooved Ware pottery emerges. Characterized by incisions or patterns made with clay strips, the majority of Grooved Ware in Cornwall continued to be made from gabbroic clay.

==== Stone and organic tools ====
Greenstone axes

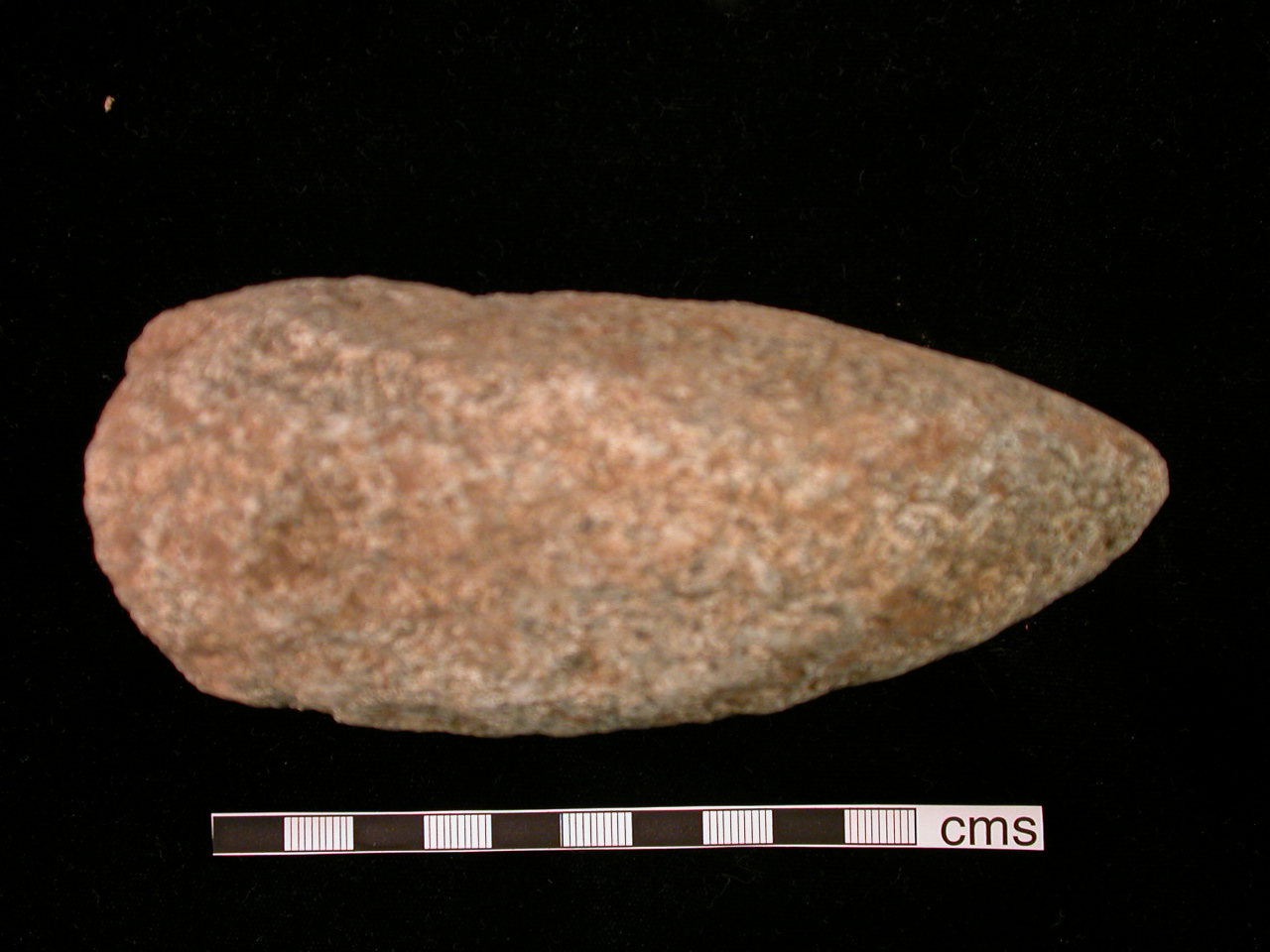
Part of a greenstone axe, c. 4500–2300 BCE, Paul

Uralitized gabbro, or 'greenstone', is a metamorphosed rock with a distinctive dark green or blue-green hue found in some areas of Cornwall such as West Penwith. Cornish greenstone is a significant source for Neolithic stone axe production. Greenstone axes are dated to the earliest Neolithic in Cornwall and have been found in significant quantities at some sites. Greenstone axe heads produced in Cornwall were valued for their high quality and colour, and were widely exchanged within Cornwall and to other parts of Britain including Wessex, East Anglia, and Yorkshire.

Archaeologists have attempted to identify potential greenstone sources and plausible 'axe factory' sites. It is believed that Cornish greenstone quarries were the source for several petrological groups of axe heads, including the Cornish group I axes which are found across Neolithic Britain and Ireland. Clodgy Moor, in West Penwith, has been identified as a Neolithic greenstone working site. Analysis of the axes found at Clodgy Moor and Carn Brea shows that they were manufactured from multiple greenstone sources, and Group I axes were probably not produced by a single 'axe factory' as had been previously suggested. While tor enclosures such as Carn Brea have been proposed as possible axe finishing sites, this has been disputed due to the lack of relevant artefact finds.

Arrowheads

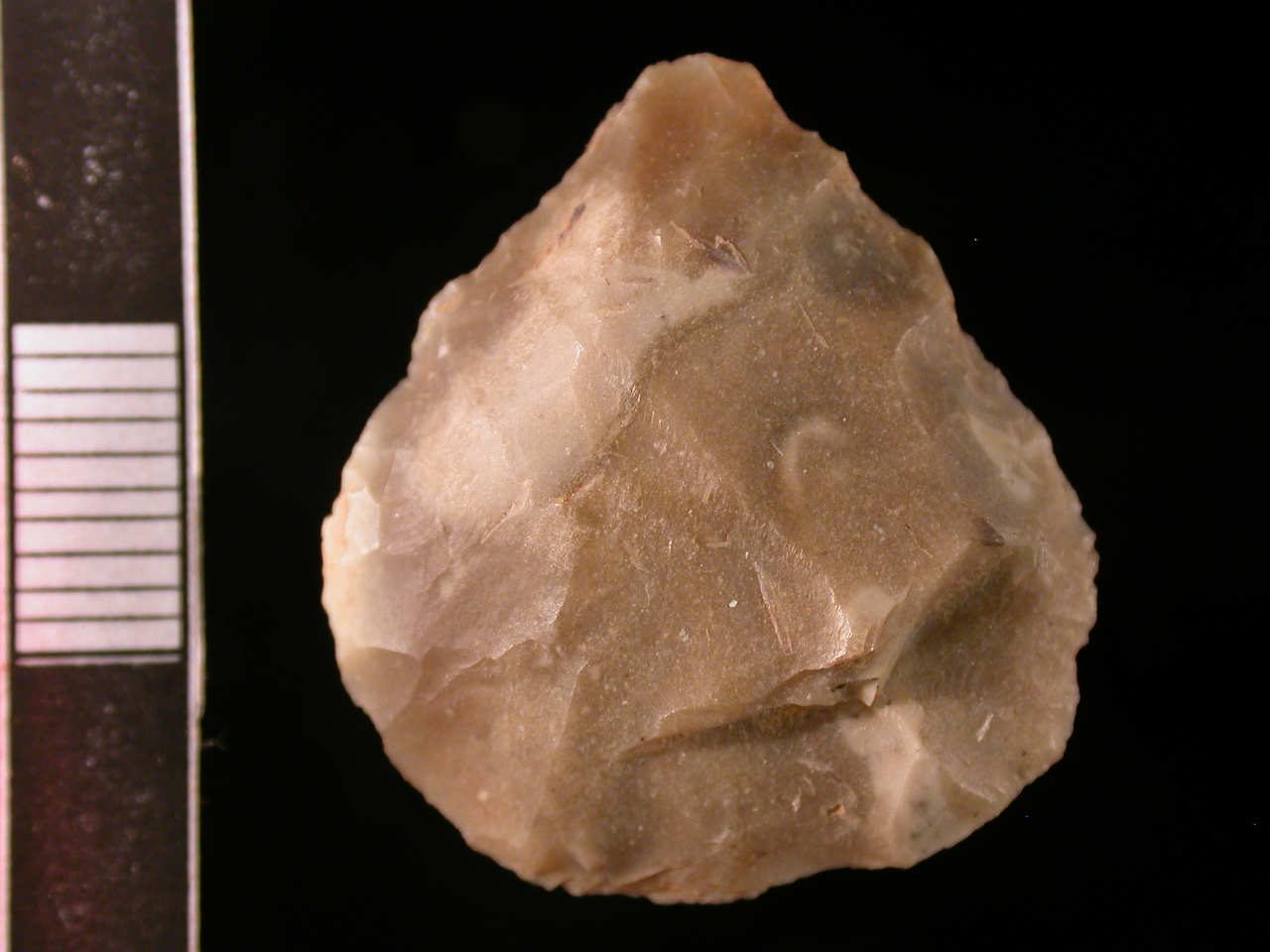
Leaf-shaped arrowhead, c. 4000–3300 BCE, Paul

In the Early Neolithic, the barbed arrowheads that were typical of the Mesolithic were replaced by leaf-shaped, single bladed arrowheads. A large number of these arrowheads have been found at Carn Brea, possibly as a result of an attack by archers on the tor enclosure. Leaf-shaped arrowheads were manufactured from the Early Neolithic until the Bronze Age. Neolithic leaf-shaped arrowheads are commonly associated with interpersonal violence.

=== Ritual ===
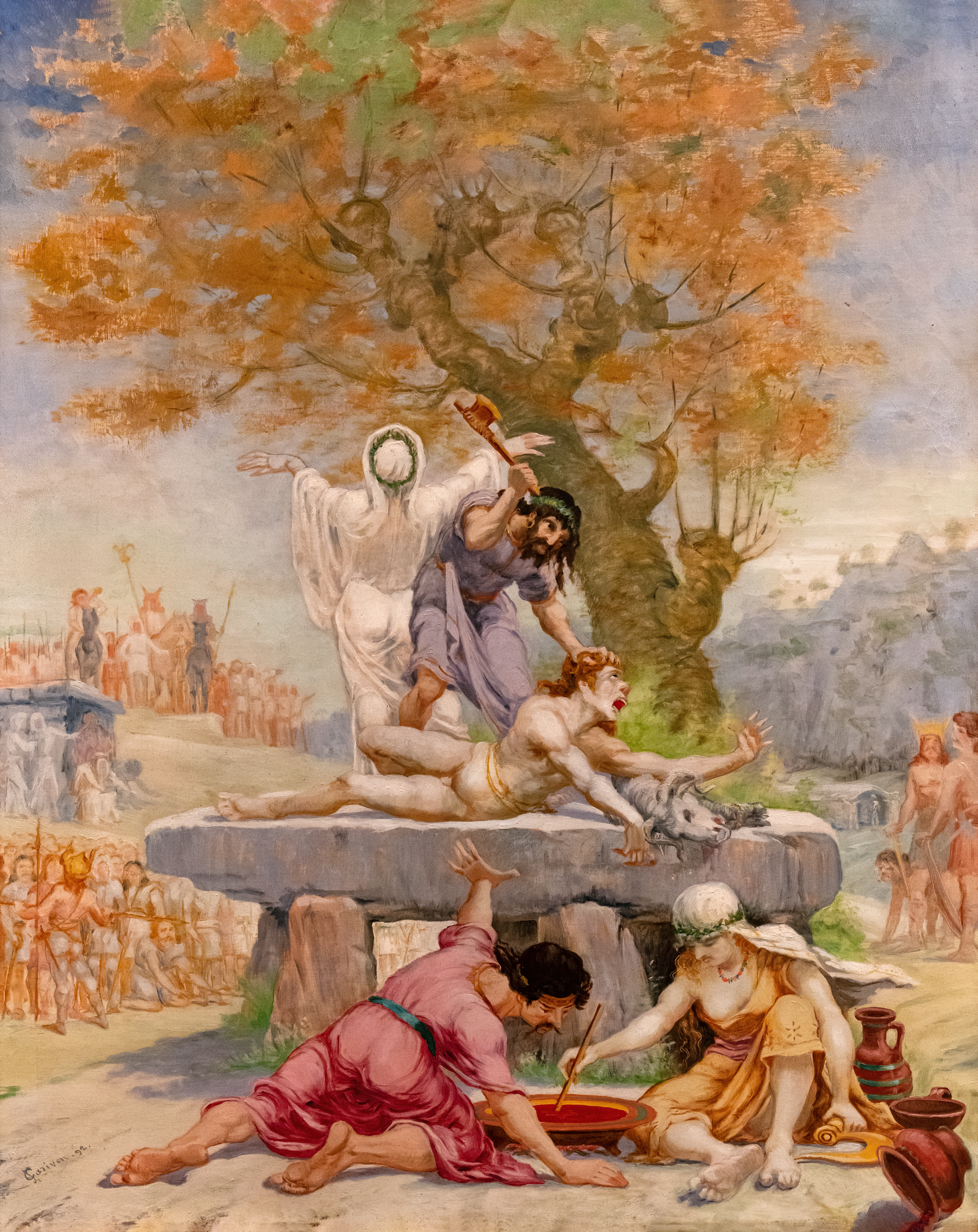
Dolmens were unlikely to have been used for human sacrifices, but may have been used to excarnate the dead

There is only limited evidence for the funeral customs of Neolithic Cornwall. Human bone remains dating to the fourth millennium BCE, found at sites such as the Sperris and Zennor quoits, suggests the practice of cremation during this period.

The capstones of dolmens and the tops of tors may have been used for excarnation. The suggestion that the capstones of dolmens were used as a sacrificial altar has been criticized as implausible.

Pits may have been used to burn pottery sherds and other items as part of a site clearing ritual when a settlement was abandoned. Several of these pits are found near rocky outcrops, which seem to have had a special importance attached to them from the Early Neolithic.

Tor enclosures may have been sites for marriage ceremonies, rites of passage into adulthood, or funerary rituals.

At Hendraburnick, over a hundred cup-markings dating to the Neolithic period are carved into a fallen greenstone standing stone. Thousands of quartz fragments, weighing nearly 150 kg, were discovered. Initially, these quartz fragments were thought to have been used to carve cupmarks into the hard greenstone, but they show no evidence of grinding, and seem to have been smashed together. Andy Jones suggests that these quartz fragments, which reflect the light of the moon and fire, may have been used in night-time rituals that took advantage of the luminescent properties of quartz to visually enhance the rock art.

=== Subsistence ===
After 4000 BCE, domesticated animals such as cattle, pigs, sheep, and goats, along with cereals like wheat and barley, were introduced into Southern Britain from Europe. The first evidence for domesticated crops in Cornwall dates to c. 4000 BCE.

The diet of the Cornish Neolithic population is not well understood. In the Early to Middle Neolithic periods in Cornwall there was only gradual progress towards an agricultural society; the widespread adoption of farming practices came later. There is no evidence for the existence of Neolithic field systems in Cornwall, and formal land boundaries and field systems for crops are not found in South West Britain until after 2000 BCE.

The climate and geography of the South West of Britain are most appropriate for a pastoral economy, and pastoralism was the predominant form of agriculture in early to middle Neolithic Cornwall, with arable farming playing only a minimal role.

During the Early and Middle Neolithic periods, the inhabitants of mainland Cornwall developed an increasing reliance on terrestrial food sources such as nuts, berries, wild boar, and deer, as well as domesticated animals and some crop farming. In contrast, the main food source in Scilly was probably seafood.

=== Social organization ===
Early Neolithic communities in Britain were likely to have been small and uncentralized societies. Roger Mercer however has suggested that a certain level of political consolidation emerged in the South West, with tor enclosures evolving from communal meeting places into central locations controlled by elites.

The process of monument construction may have served to reinforce social relationships, hierarchical organization, and group identity. Completed monuments may have been seen as representing a particular group's identity, with long barrows representing a single extended family, and larger monuments such as dolmens or tor enclosures representing larger groups or supergroups of families.

The evidence for attacks on tor enclosures such as Carn Brea implies that violent conflicts at least occasionally occurred between relatively large groups.

Shared monument styles suggest local connections between Neolithic communities in Cornwall and groups on the European mainland.

=== Trade and cultural links ===
Some evidence is found for cultural contact and trade with southern Britain, along the Atlantic Façade, and with mainland Europe. Tor enclosures have been interpreted as central hubs in exchange networks that connected Cornwall with other economic centres in Britain. These exchange networks, which existed from c. 3700 BCE, were originally short or medium distance connections which expanded in range over time.

Cornwall's stone and gabbroic clay were important raw materials in the Neolithic period. Stone axes and gabbroic pottery from Cornwall were widely exchanged and circulated across Britain from c. 3700 BCE. Stone axes from Cornwall are found throughout England, and into Wales and Ireland and, although Cornish gabbroic pottery is only found in small amounts at sites such as Robin Hood's Ball and Windmill Hill, it was widely distributed.

Imported goods reached Cornwall including Beer flint, Portland chert, and axes from northern England and Wales. Additionally, jadeite axes from Europe dating from the 4th millennium BCE, with the jadeite possibly originating from Switzerland, are found in Falmouth, Hayle, and Newquay.

While Roger Mercer has suggested that the route of the exchange of goods between Cornwall and Wessex approximately followed the modern A30 road, this view has been questioned due to the heavy forest cover along this route during the Neolithic era.

The Fowey and Camel rivers may have been important Neolithic waterways. The Red River, which links the Carn Brea tor enclosure and the Gwithian Neolithic site, may have served as a smaller, more westerly waterway during the early Neolithic.

=== Ethnicity and genetics ===
Pollard and Healey et al. have suggested the existence of a distinctive sub-regional identity in Cornwall during the Neolithic, based on pottery styles, lithic tools such as the greenstone axes, and the megalithic structures.

Genetic studies indicate that the British Mesolithic Western Hunter-Gatherer population was eventually replaced by the descendants of farmers from the Aegean region who reached Britain by c. 4000—3700 BCE. British Neolithic farmers derived most of their ancestry from Iberian Neolithic individuals who descended from Early European Farmer populations that followed the 'Mediterranean route', with a smaller contribution from populations who followed the 'Danubian route'. Throughout the Neolithic there was only minimal admixture between the arriving farmer groups and the indigenous hunter-gatherer populations in Britain, with no resurgence of Western Hunter-Gatherer ancestry.

== Bronze Age (c. 2400–800 BCE) ==
=== Chronology and overview ===
Chronology
Chalcolithic (Beaker-using)	c. 2400–1700 BCE
Early Bronze Age	c. 2050–1500 BCE
Middle Bronze Age	c. 1500–1100 BCE
Late Bronze Age	c. 1100–800 BCE

The Bronze Age in Britain is dated to the arrival of the Bell Beaker culture, which is initially a Copper Age, followed by the adoption of tin and copper alloying techniques to manufacture bronze tools and weapons a few hundred years later. Bell Beaker culture was probably introduced to Cornwall via Southern Britain, rather than directly from the European mainland. Ancient DNA studies have revealed significant human migrations into Britain during the Beaker to Early Bronze Age period, with groups carrying high levels of Yamnaya-related ancestry arriving from the European mainland. Ancient DNA studies also show that a second migration of groups from Europe, who carried Yamnaya-related ancestry with comparatively high levels of Early European Farmer ancestry, occurred c. 1300–800 BCE.

In Cornwall there was a resurgence of monument construction and changes in ritual and burial customs in the Early Bronze Age, along with the emergence of new pottery styles such as Trevisker Ware, a distinctive regional pottery style that originated in Cornwall c. 2000 BCE and continued to be produced for almost a millennium. There was an agricultural revolution c. 1500 BCE, resulting in the further expansion of farming and the creation of formal field boundaries. Settled communities developed, and large numbers of roundhouses were constructed throughout Cornwall.

Artefact finds demonstrate that Cornwall was part of an expansive trade network from at least the Early Bronze Age. Metals such as gold and tin, probably extracted before c. 2000 BCE, were widely exported across Britain and Ireland, to the European mainland, and as far as the Eastern Mediterranean. Additionally gabbroic pottery from Cornwall is found across Southern Britain, and sporadically in South Wales, Ireland, and Brittany.

=== Environment ===
The 4.2-kiloyear event, c. 2250 BCE, resulted in lower temperatures and wetter conditions throughout Britain from c. 2050 BCE to 550 BCE. Towards the end of the Bronze Age, c. 1200–850 BCE, there was a brief period of warmer and drier conditions prior to the 2.7-kiloyear event at the beginning of the Iron Age.

Throughout the Bronze Age, the oak and hazel woodland that once covered much of Southwest Britain underwent substantial clearance, resulting in the expansion of scrub and grassland areas. Clearance of elm woodland in the Early and Middle Bronze Age may have coincided with the construction of monuments and field systems, and may be indicative of agricultural expansion. In the Middle to Late Bronze Age in Scilly, c. 1650–1050 BCE, there are indications of limited woodland clearance, possibly for crop cultivation. By the Late Bronze Age, ongoing woodland clearance led to increased sediment deposition on river floodplains.

Several archaeological sites provide evidence that Bronze Age communities in Cornwall actively managed woodlands and meadows to provide timber for construction and create suitable grazing land for livestock.

=== Material culture ===
==== Settlements ====
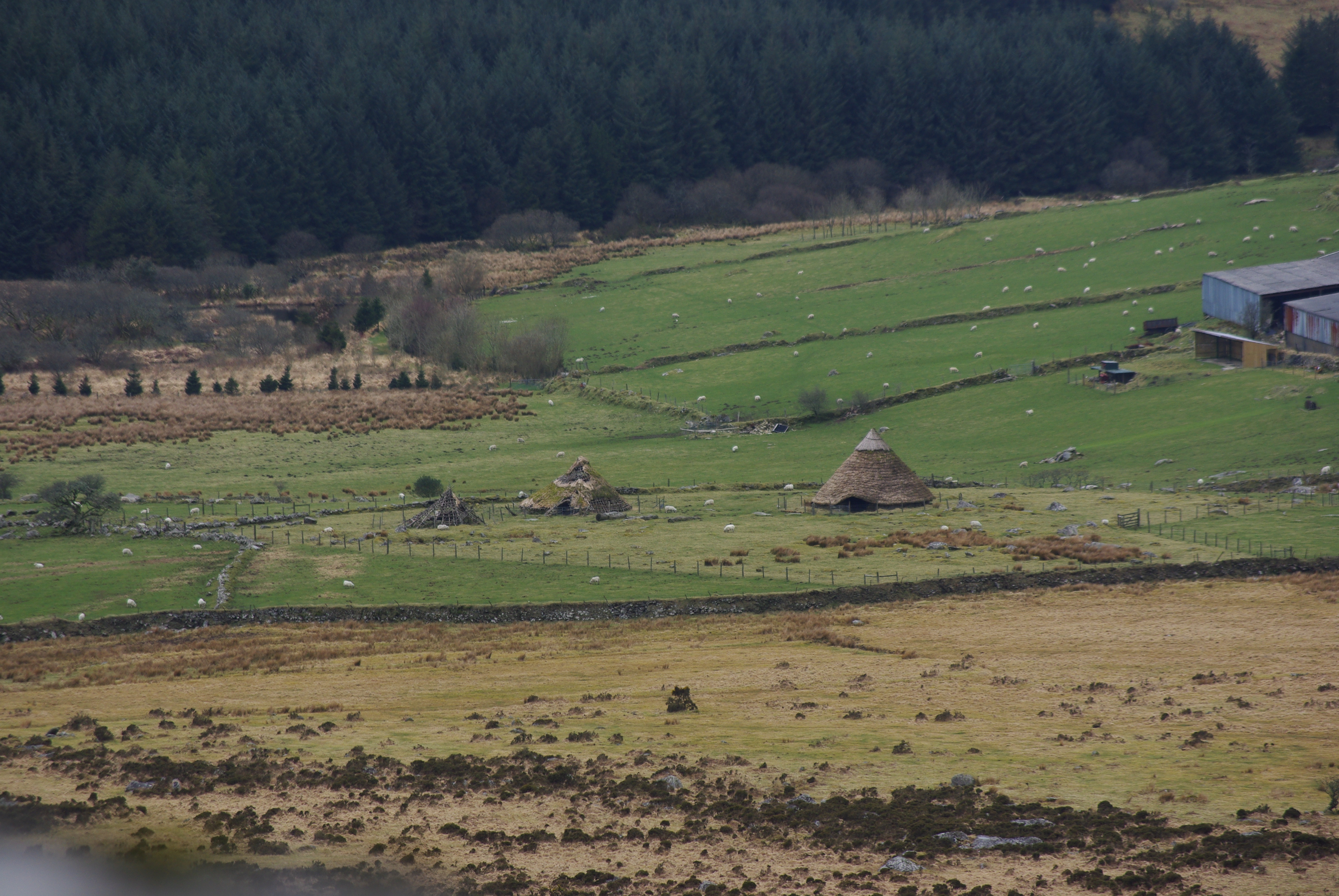
Reconstructed Bronze Age village at Trewortha Farm

Direct evidence for settlements and domestic structures in the Early Bronze Age is very rare, and permanent structures have not been found. The earliest evidence for a Bronze Age domestic structure comes from a Beaker-associated site in Sennen, West Cornwall, c. 2400 BCE. Other Beaker sites include Polcoverack and Poldowrian, both located on the Lizard Peninsula.

Settlement organization varies, with open settlements of roundhouses surrounded by field systems at some sites, and temporary camps constructed by seasonal pastoralists in the uplands.

During the Middle Bronze Age, monuments were integrated into settlements instead of remaining separate and distant as they were in the Early Bronze Age.

Roundhouses

The earliest substantial roundhouses date to the Middle Bronze Age, appearing either as isolated structures or forming small villages. Two main types of Middle Bronze Age roundhouses are found. In the lowland zone, so-called 'sunken-floored' roundhouses are found, featuring low walls constructed from slate or wattle and daub, a roof supported by a post ring, and a hollow-set floor. Conversely, in upland areas such as Bodmin Moor and Penwith, circular granite-walled huts are typical. In Scilly, buildings with thick walls were constructed from granite blocks, and were typically built into terraced slopes or hollows to provide protection against the prevailing wind.

==== Monuments ====
After a decline in monument construction in the later Neolithic, there is a resurgence in the Early Bronze Age, and numerous barrows, cairns and megalithic structures were constructed in the first half of the second millennium BCE. Monuments were often placed near, in sight of, aligned with, or on top of significant natural features such as hills, rivers, and particularly rocky outcrops.

Tombs

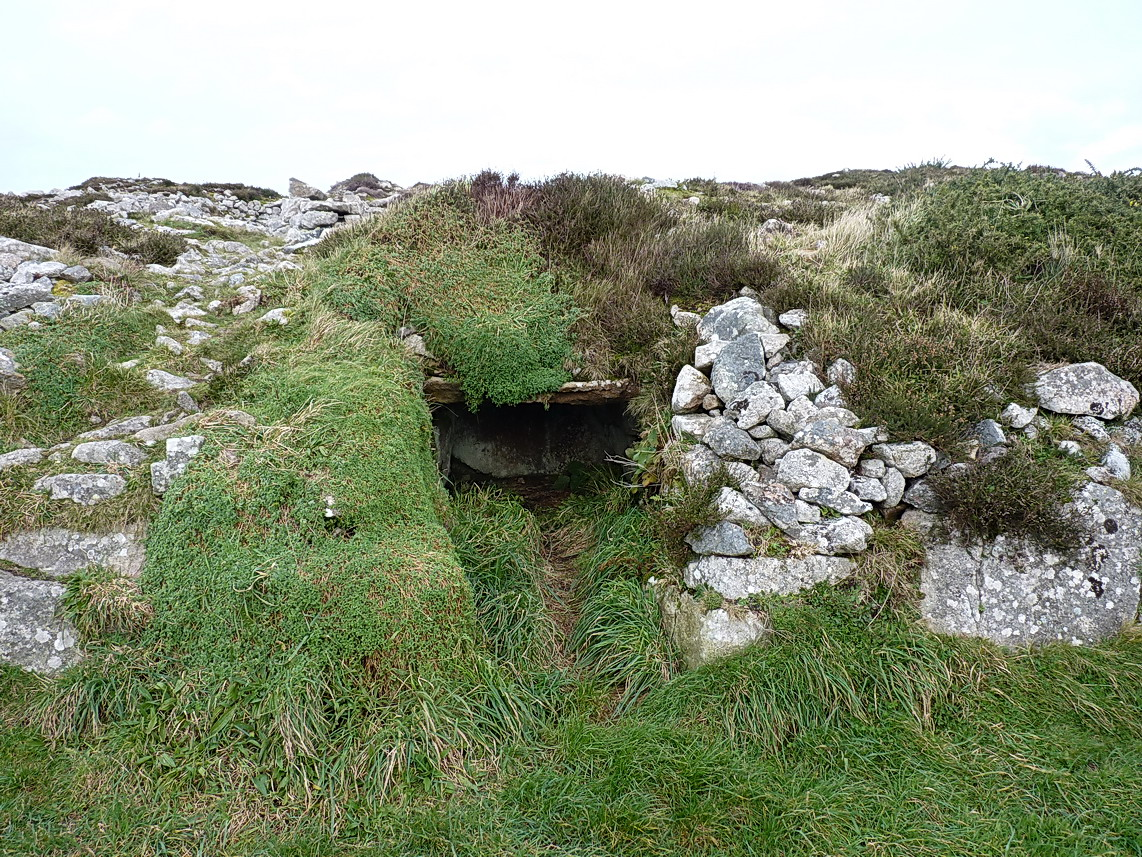
Ballowall Barrow

Bronze Age barrows and cairns, built in Cornwall from c. 2100 BCE, include a wide variety of types such as bowl barrows, bell barrows, disc barrows, plate barrows, platform barrows, ring cairns, and tailed cairns. Barrows and cairns had a range of uses, many of which were unrelated to burials. Groups of barrows ('barrow cemeteries') are commonly found, usually in distinctive parts of the landscape. Barrows were often built around tors and prominent rock formations

Entrance graves, also known as 'undifferentiated passage graves', are small chambered tombs that share characteristics with both passage graves and gallery graves, as there is no distinction between the entrance passage and the chamber, but they are covered by a round tumulus. Dated c. 2000–1500 BCE, they are, in Cornwall, restricted to Scilly and West Penwith, although similar monuments are found in South East Ireland, South West Scotland, the Channel Islands, Brittany, and Southern Spain.

Megaliths

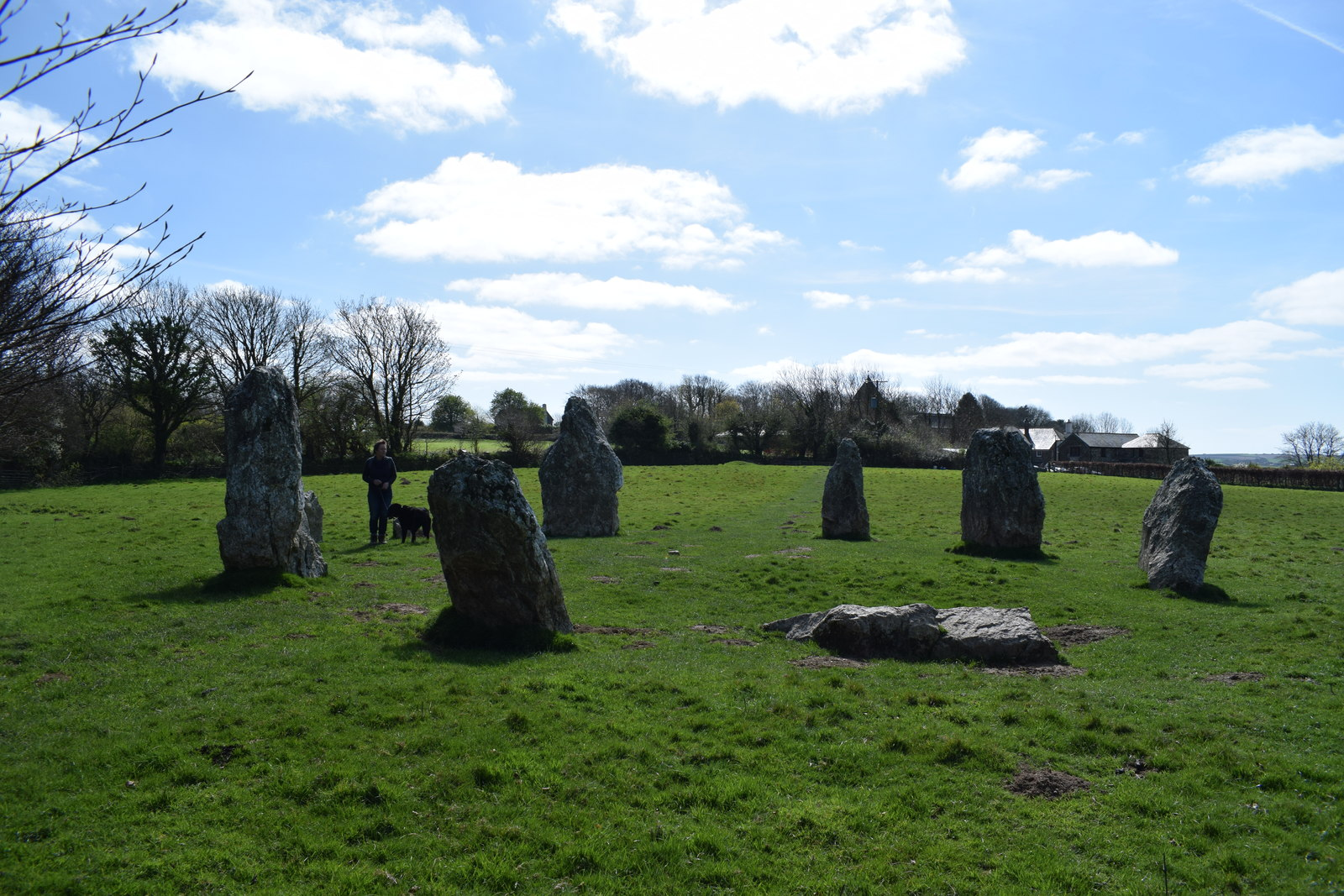
Duloe Stone circle

During the Bronze Age a large number of megalithic structures such as menhirs, stone circles, and stone rows were placed. Menhirs likely served as memorial gravestones, stone circles as ceremonial sites, and stone rows possibly as processional avenues. Megalithic monuments are often aligned with each other, and may have marked the position of river sources or other natural features.

Examples of menhirs include two monuments called The Pipers (one at St Buryan and another at Minions), the Blind Fiddler near Catchall, the Old Man of Gugh in Scilly, the Tremenheere Longstone on the Lizard, and the Try Menhir at Gulval.

Stone circles are rings of upright stones placed at intervals on a circular or elliptical path. More than 20 stone circles are found in Cornwall. These structures, most of which were probably constructed in the Early Bronze Age, are mainly found on Bodmin Moor and West Penwith. Solar alignments have been proposed for some of these.

There are 8 stone rows in Cornwall, primarily located on Bodmin Moor, including Carneglos, Buttern hill, Craddock Moor, and Leskernick. While the exact purpose of stone rows continues to be debated, they may have been used to mark connections between parts of the landscape or to demarcate sacred areas.

==== Pottery ====
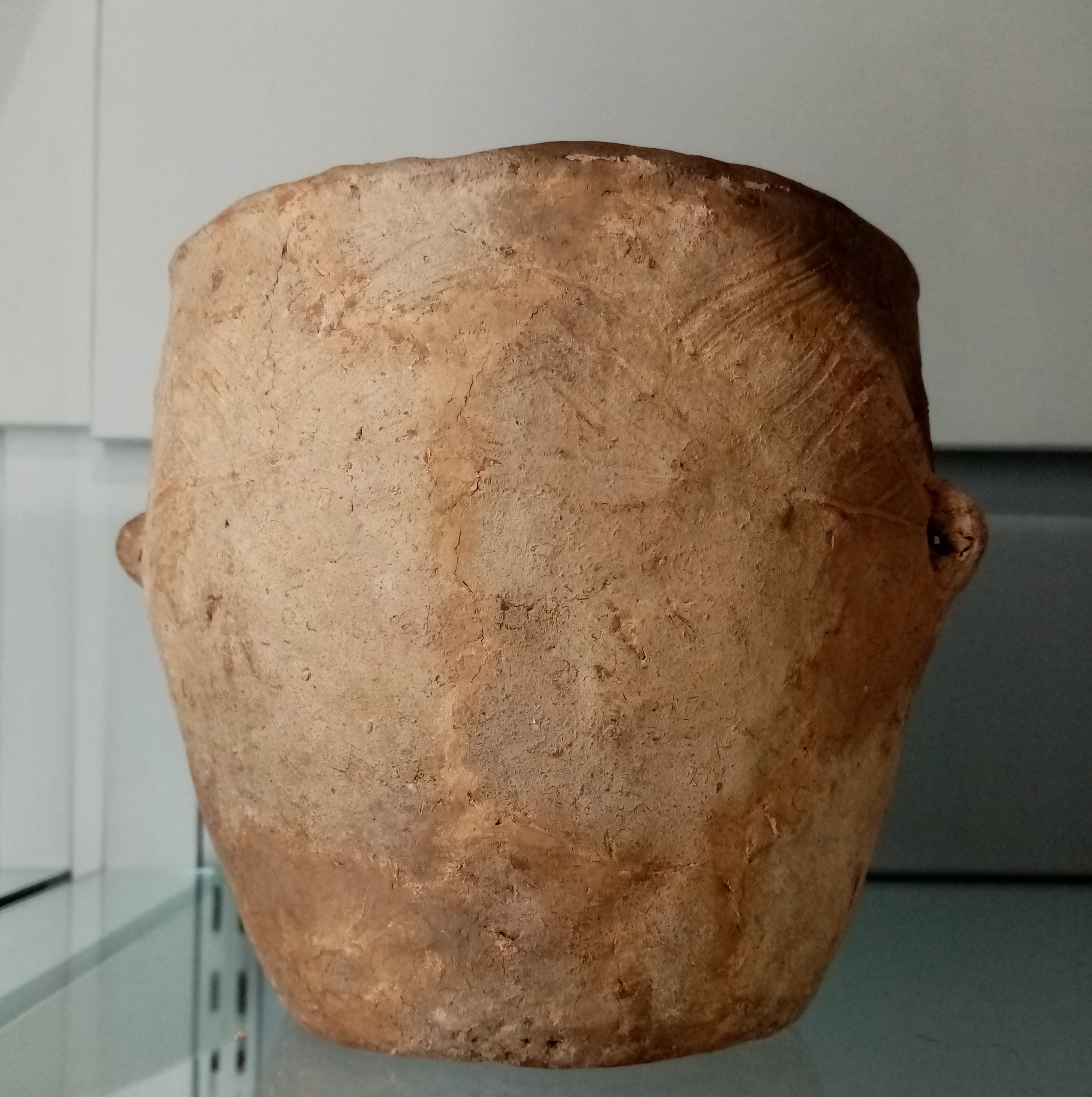
Trevisker Urn, Pedngwinian Point, Lizard

Bell Beaker pottery is found in Western and Central Europe from c. 2750 BCE until c. 1800 BCE. In Cornwall, the earliest Beaker pottery dates to c. 2400–2100 BCE. Early Beaker pottery is made from a variety of clay fabrics. The earliest S-profiled Beakers are followed by long-necked forms after c. 2100 BCE. Beaker pottery has not yet been found in Scilly.

Trevisker Ware, a distinctive pottery style originating in Cornwall, originated around c. 2000 BCE, and was the predominant pottery style throughout the 2nd millennium. Trevisker Ware was produced with only minimal stylistic changes throughout the Early and Middle Bronze Age. Trevisker Ware vessels are typically biconical or have curved sides, often decorated with lines, zigzags, or chevrons. Initially produced using a variety of gabbroic, granitic, and other clays which were sometimes blended together, the proportion of vessels made with gabbroic clay increased to 90% by the Middle Bronze Age, by which time Trevisker Ware became the only ceramic style used in Cornwall. This pottery style spread beyond Cornwall into Devon, South Wales, Somerset, and Dorset.

Bronze Age pottery in Scilly, some of which may be classified as falling within the Trevisker Ware tradition, exhibits simpler decorative patterns, and was probably produced from local granitic clays.

In the Late Bronze Age, after c. 1000 BCE, Trevisker Ware was replaced by the Plain Ware pottery styles that are found across the rest of southern Britain. The contemporaneous Decorated Ware, however, is not found in Cornwall.

==== Metal ====
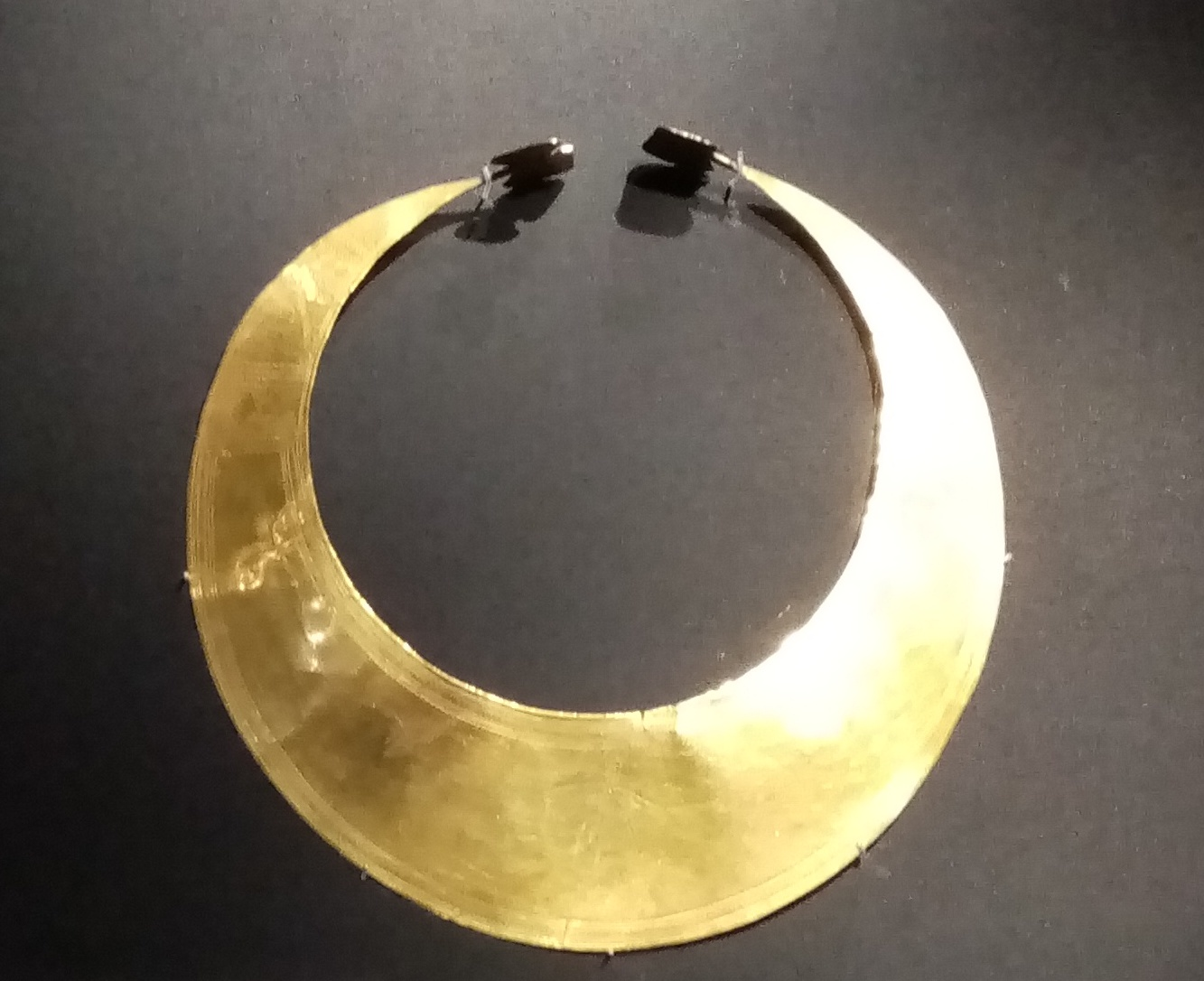
St Juliot lunula

Tin, copper, lead, silver, iron, and gold are found in Cornwall. Exploitation of tin and gold deposits in Cornwall may have begun as early as 2300 BCE. Both tin and gold from Cornwall are believed to have circulated throughout Britain and Ireland, as well as along the Atlantic Façade, and even reaching the Eastern Mediterranean.

Direct evidence for tin production and extraction in Cornwall is limited, though traces of cassiterite on tools discovered at sites at Sennan, Lelant, and Truro provide some of the earliest confirmed evidence of tin mining activity in Britain. Additional evidence includes cassiterite pebble finds, tin slag, and tools such as antler picks and wooden shovels, suggesting that tin mining took place on a larger scale than can be currently demonstrated.

There is some evidence for local Bronze Age metalwork production, with domestic structures at Tremough, near Falmouth (c. 1900–1600 BCE) and Trevalga (c. 1400–1300 BCE) identified as metallurgists' homes.

Notable gold artefacts found in Cornwall in the Bronze Age include the Rillaton gold cup, (c. 1950–1750 BCE) and four gold lunulae (gold sheets cut into crescent shapes and decorated). Traces of tin in two of the lunulae suggest that the gold used in their manufacture may originate from Cornwall.

==== Stone and organic tools ====
Flint and chert continued to be imported from Beer and possibly Portland by the Bronze Age inhabitants of Bodmin Moor c. 2000 BCE. However, the import of flint dwindled by the later 2nd millennium BCE, with local beach pebbles utilized instead.

Stone working at some sites has been described as rudimentary, suggesting an increased reliance on metal tools. However a variety of stone and flint knives, axes, and arrowheads are found, sometimes imports of fairly high quality. Additionally a significant number of cereal processing tools including saddle querns, mullers, and pestles are found. There are also several examples of stone artefacts that are associated with metalworking, including stone axe moulds, hammerstones, and one example of a stone racloir mould.

Various tools associated with working animal hides have been discovered, including scrapers, flensing stones, lapstones, slickstones, and rubbing stones.

Tools such as querns, loom weights, and spindle whorls, indicative of food processing and textile production, have been found. Additionally, cupped pebbles, potentially used as nutcrackers, have been discovered at some sites. Furthermore, antler picks and wooden shovels, perhaps used in tin mining are found.

=== Ritual ===
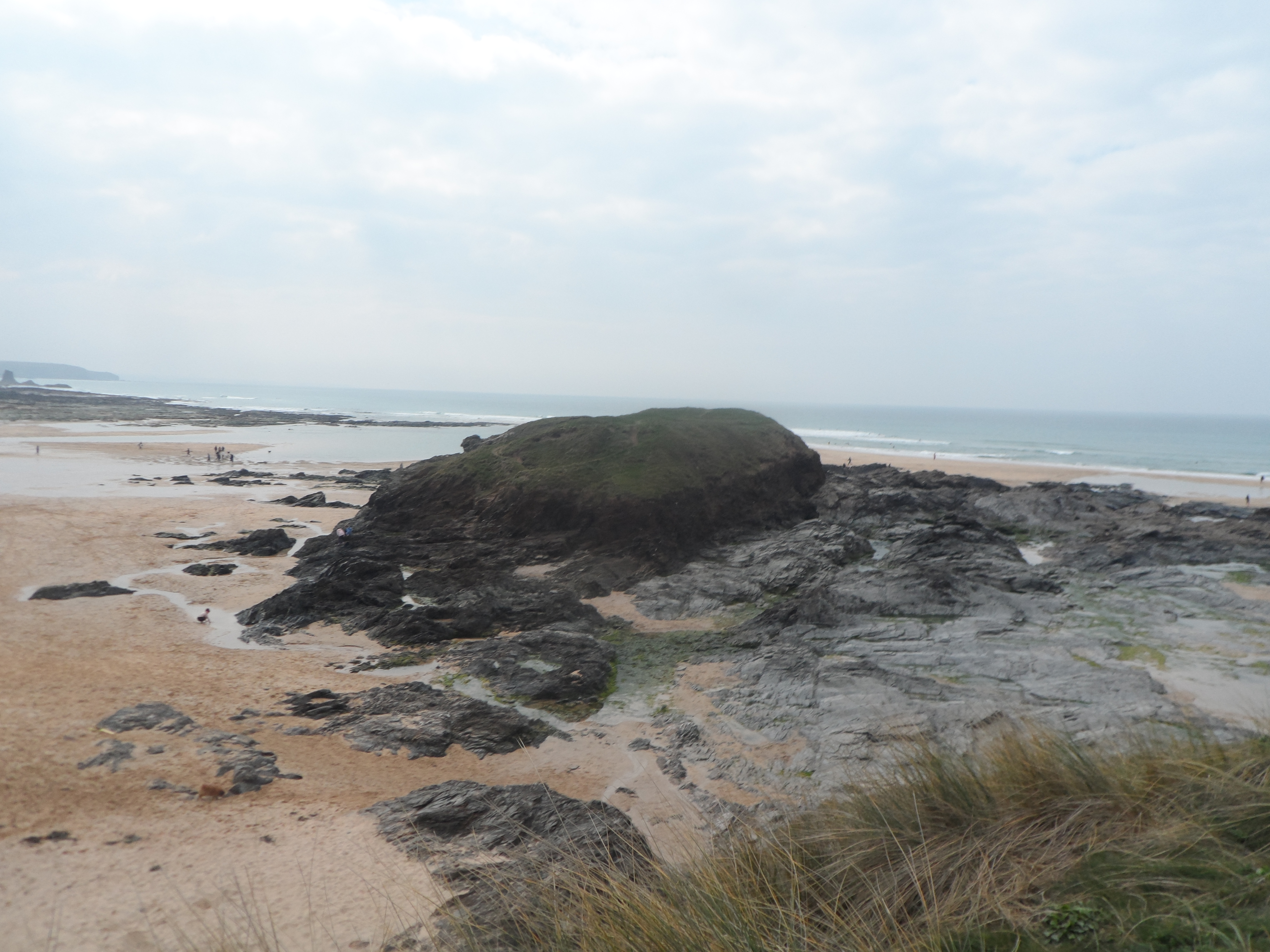
Constantine Island, site of a Middle Bronze Age cist burial

Bronze Age inhumation burials are rare in Cornwall, suggesting that funerary rituals of this period did not necessarily require burial of the dead. In Cornwall, unlike the rest of early Bronze Age Britain, cremations are predominant in Beaker-associated contexts, and there is a strong preference for cremation funerals in the Early Bronze Age as a whole. Examples of inhumation burials are found at Harlyn Bay, where a young Early Bronze Age female was found accompanied by a large quartz-rich stone, and on Constantine Island, where a Middle Bronze Age male was found buried in a cist in a crouched position. There is also a single example of a multiple inhumation burial at the Watch Hill site at St Stephen-in-Brannel.

Distinctive local burial customs, which show Atlantic influence, are found in the far South West.

=== Subsistence ===
Agriculture significantly expanded after c. 1500 BCE, and by this time it is likely that the majority of the population of Cornwall belonged to farming communities.

Arable farming expanded throughout South West Britain from c. 1700 BCE. In the Early Bronze Age, the first evidence for significant arable farming in Cornwall is found, along with continuing livestock farming. Between 1500 and 1200 BCE, field system walls for crop boundaries were constructed across the moorlands and lowlands of Cornwall. However pastoral farming predominated, with arable farming mainly restricted to coastal areas where the soil was more suitable for crop cultivation. Lowland and coastal settlements were mixed arable and pastoral farming communities that supplemented their diet with hunting, fishing and gathering.

Domesticated crops grown in Bronze Age Cornwall included wheat, barley, rye, oats, peas, and broad beans. Crop rotation was implemented, and new breeds of sheep with wool more suitable for clothing manufacture were introduced. Milk residues are found on pottery at some sites.

=== Social organization ===
The Late Bronze Age material culture of Cornwall suggests the existence of a small warrior elite and social hierarchy that persisted throughout the second millennium BCE. Power appears to have been centred in several areas, including the Harlyn Bay area, the Colliford, Rillaton, and Pelynt group, the Mount's Bay region, the groups of settlements in West Penwith and the Lizard, and the various barrow groups in North and Central Cornwall

According to Tilley, the construction and control of monuments, overseen by a class of 'ritual specialists', played a central role in establishing and maintaining authority within local communities. However Peter Herring presents an alternative perspective, suggesting that decision-making processes, at least on Bodmin Moor, were more communal, along the lines of a 'village council'. Similarly Barbara Bender suggests that Bronze age communities on Bodmin Moor exhibited a "limited vertical hierarchy."

=== Trade and cultural links ===
Economic and cultural connections between Cornwall and other communities along the Atlantic Façade are demonstrated by similar burial practices and artefact finds. Jon Henderson proposes that "the communities of the Atlantic Late Bronze Age formed a wide framework of interacting local systems united through the exchange and production of similar metalwork forms", with shared ritual practices that distinguished these communities from those of the Urnfield culture in mainland Europe.

Cornwall was positioned on trade routes between Ireland and the European mainland, and its raw materials, such as tin and Lizardite, were traded to Scotland, Holland, and Germany. Cornwall may have been the primary source of the gold used in the British and Irish Early Bronze Age. Gold from Cornwall may have been used to make many of the lunulae found in Ireland and along the Atlantic Façade. Gold from the Carnon river and tin from Redruth are the likely source for these metals used in the Nebra sky disc.

=== Ethnicity and genetics ===
There is no evidence that the current boundaries of Cornwall held any significance for the Bronze Age inhabitants of this region, and the Bronze Age inhabitants of present-day Cornwall likely had complex identities that were linked to family, obligation, and regional geography.

After c. 2450 BCE, populations from Europe carrying high levels of an ancestral component related to Yamnaya populations arrived in Britain, leading to the replacement of around 90% of the autosomal DNA of the British Neolithic population within a few hundred years. Furthermore subclades of Y-chromosome haplogroup R1b-M269, especially R1b-P312, previously absent in the Neolithic, were found in over 90% of British Bronze Age males.

A subsequent migration after c. 1300 BCE, possibly from France, brought an increase in Early European Farmer ancestry to Southern Britain. The average Early European Farmer-related ancestry in Bronze Age England and Wales increased from an average of 31% in the Chalcolithic and Early Bronze Age, to 34.7% in the Middle Bronze Age, and to 36.1% by the Late Bronze Age.

DNA analysis has been performed on two ancient Bronze Age individuals from Cornwall. A young female from Harlyn Bay, dated to the Copper Age or Early Bronze Age (c. 2285–2036 BCE) was found to be mitochondrial DNA haplogroup R1b, and her ancestry was modelled as 11.1% Western Hunter-Gatherer, 29.5% Early European Farmer, and 59.4% Yamnaya-related. A second individual, a male from Constantine Island, was dated to the Middle Bronze Age (c. 1381–1056 BCE), was assigned to Y-chromosome haplogroup R1b1a1b1a1a2a, a subclade of R-DF27, and was modelled as 11.5% Western Hunter-Gatherer, 34.3% Early European Farmer, and 54.1% Yamnaya-related.

== Iron Age (c. 800 BCE – 43 CE) ==
=== Chronology and overview ===
Chronology
Earliest Iron Age	c. 800–600 BCE
Early Iron Age	c. 600–400 BCE
Late Iron Age	c. 400 BCE – 43 CE

The Iron Age in Britain is usually dated from c. 800 BCE until the Roman invasion, c. 43 CE. This period marked a significant transition from bronze to iron for tool and weapon production, and coincided with widespread climatic deterioration across Europe that resulted in colder and wetter conditions throughout much of the Iron Age.

British Iron Age settlements were mostly small enclosed farmsteads with an economy based on pastoralism and arable farming. Settlements, consisting mainly of roundhouses, also served as ritual centres for feasting, sacrifice, and other ritual practices. Hillforts, built across Britain from c. 1000 BCE, have traditionally been seen as central features of the British Iron Age, and have been interpreted as elite fortresses within a hierarchical and warlike 'Celtic' society, although this model of hillforts and social organization has been controversial, and continues to be debated. By the end of the Iron Age Britain was densely populated, and production of tools, weapons, and pottery became increasingly specialized.

In Cornwall, iron smelting was introduced c. 800 BCE, and significant amounts of ore and artefacts were produced locally, while pottery continued to evolve, with the development of distinctive regional wares from styles shared with other regions of South West Britain. Settlement patterns varied, ranging from single farmsteads and small villages to fortified strongholds like hillforts and cliff castles. The Iron Age economy in Cornwall was primarily pastoral, based on sheep and cattle, with some arable farming. Early Iron Age society may have been dominated by a few elite groups who occupied the hillforts, while political power may have been more widely distributed among the occupants of the rounds by the later Iron Age.

Cornwall participated in long-distance trade networks, exporting tin and iron, and had cultural contacts with Brittany and other groups along the Atlantic Façade, with artefact finds perhaps suggesting marriage alliances between these communities. The Cornovii are likely to have inhabited Cornwall during this period, perhaps as a subtribe of the Dumnonii or possibly as an independent tribe.

=== Environment ===
During the transition to the Iron Age, between c. 800 and 750 BCE, an abrupt climatic shift known as the 2.7 (or 2.8) Ka event occurred across Europe, resulting in colder and wetter conditions in Britain that lasted between c. 200 and 400 years. This period was followed by a return to drier conditions that lasted until c. 400 BCE when another shift towards wetter conditions occurred. However there is only limited evidence for climatic deterioration on Bodmin Moor around the onset of the Iron Age. Between 550–380 BCE, some sites on Bodmin Moor experienced increasingly wetter conditions, which may be attributable to either climate deterioration or deforestation. Pollen analysis suggests major woodland clearance on Roughtor c. 760–390 BCE, and at Higher Moors, Scilly, c. 820–410 BCE. In the Late Iron Age there was an increase in heather cover on Bodmin Moor, which could be attributed to factors such as acidification of the soil, reduced grazing activity, or deliberate burning.

=== Material culture ===
==== Settlements ====
Iron Age settlements in Cornwall include enclosed settlements such as rounds, cliff castles, and hillforts, as well as large numbers of unenclosed settlements of single or multiple roundhouses. There is some overlap in the definitions of the various enclosed settlement types. In some cases open settlements were later fully or partially enclosed, and earlier enclosed settlements were occasionally expanded with additional fortifications. At the beginning of the Iron Age, settlements shift from higher ground on moors to lowlands, perhaps as a result of deteriorating climatic conditions and overgrazing. There is an apparent decline in the number of open settlements in the Later Iron Age, with a corresponding increase in the number of enclosed settlements. Iron Age settlements in Cornwall were often built within extensive field systems.

Roundhouses

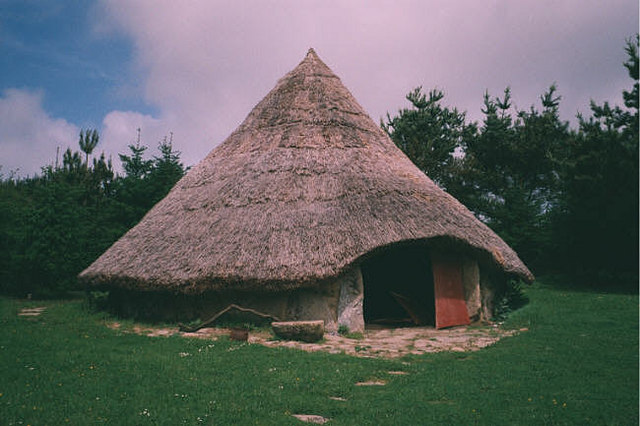
Reconstruction of an Iron Age roundhouse at Bodrifty

Iron Age roundhouses typically consisted of an internal post ring that supported a conical thatched roof, with an external wall that was constructed from materials such as stone, shale, turf, or timber. Some Iron Age roundhouses are significantly larger than those of the Late Bronze Age, as with roundhouses elsewhere in Iron Age Britain.

Rounds

Rounds, small agricultural settlements typically encompassing less than one hectare, consist of a few roundhouses enclosed by either one (univallate) or occasionally two (bivallate) ramparts and ditches that were probably intended to keep out livestock and wild animals. Commonly situated in hilly, fertile terrain at moderate elevations, rounds were likely the homes of a single family or extended family unit.

The rounds of Cornwall and Devon are similar to other enclosed settlements such as the ringforts of Wales and Ireland and the banked enclosures of Brittany. They are the most common Late Iron Age enclosed settlement type in Cornwall, with as many as a thousand rounds constructed in Cornwall over a millennium from the 4th century BCE to the early medieval period. Activities within rounds included arable and livestock farming, food processing, and limited metalworking and pottery production.

Multiple enclosure forts are typically larger (normally up to two hectares) and more secure (two or three ramparts and ditches) than rounds, but unlike most hillforts they are situated on hillsides or spurs. Found in a wide variety of forms, these structures were probably for protecting and managing livestock.

Hillforts

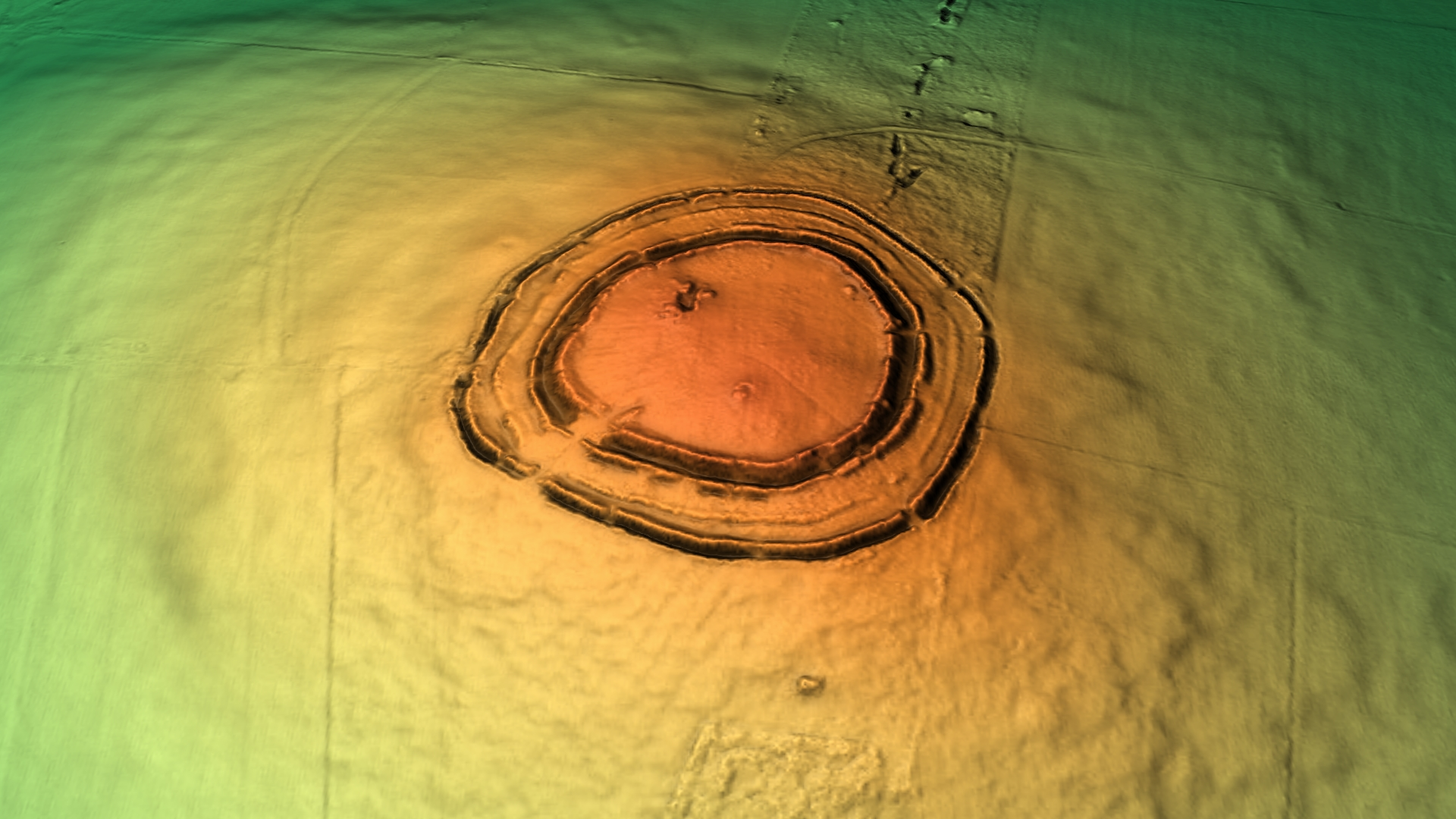
Digital terrain model of Castle an Dinas

Hillforts, strategically positioned fortified sites constructed from earth, timber, or stone, were typically located on high ground. These forts feature banks and ditches with timber or stone facing and a wooden palisade, occasionally incorporating natural features such as steep slopes or cliffs for additional protection. Compared to hillforts found in other regions like Wessex and the Welsh Borders, those in Cornwall tend to be smaller, simpler, and less defensible, although there are exceptions such as Castle Canyke and Castle-an-Dinas.

While most hillforts in Cornwall are features of the Later Iron Age, some earlier hilltop enclosures date to the Neolithic and Bronze Age periods. Hillforts have been interpreted as elite strongholds, but they may instead have been farming settlements. However, evidence for grain storage structures or roundhouses within hillforts is limited. They may have played a role in herding livestock, and could have been used for rituals and exchange.

Cliff castles

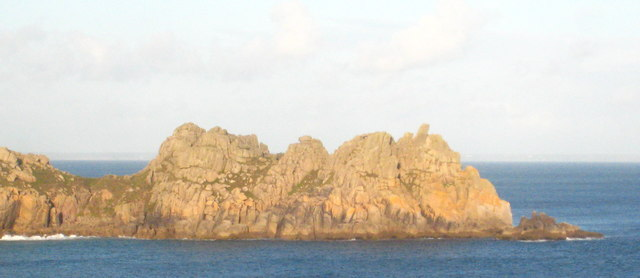
Treryn Dinas, site of an Iron Age cliff castle

Cliff castles are headland promontories projecting into the sea, enclosed by ramparts and ditches. At least 60 cliff castles are found along the Cornish coastline, including Trevelgue Head, which has been described as "the most complex Iron Age coastal site in south-western Britain." Similarities have been noted between the cliff castles of South West Britain and those of Brittany, and they are also found on the Scilly Isles, the Channel Islands, the Isle of Man, the west of Ireland, Wales, Scotland and Orkney. While most cliff castles in the south west date to the Late Iron Age, Mean Castle, Trevelgue Head, and The Rumps in Cornwall have been dated to the Early Iron Age. According to Barry Cunliffe, cliff castles formed an "essential part of the settlement pattern for at least three centuries".

Like hillforts, cliff castles have usually been interpreted as elite settlements, and they may have been used for managing livestock and were possibly involved in long-distance trade.

'Strongly defended settlements'

Some enclosures are strongly defended despite their relatively small size. This has led some archaeologists to distinguish between 'defended' and 'strongly defended' sites. Examples of 'strongly defended sites' include Chûn castle, a site characterized by two massive concentric granite walls and ditches enclosing twelve structures. within a compact area only 100 metres wide. The walls were probably constructed prior to the 1st century BCE.

Courtyard houses

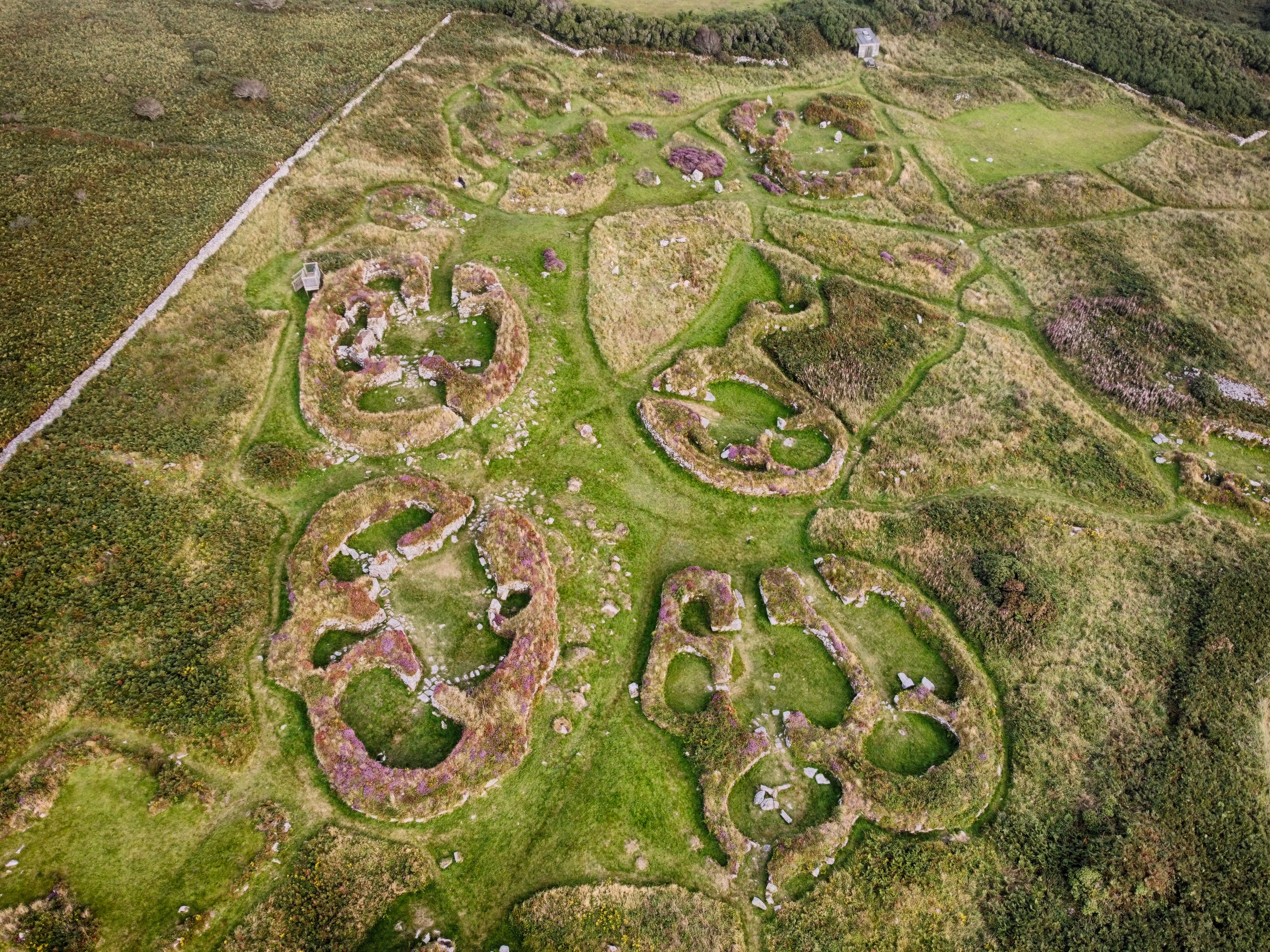
Chysauster, a village of courtyard houses

Courtyard houses, geographically restricted to West Penwith and Scilly, are characterized by thick stone-faced walls filled with rubble or earth, multiple rooms, and a central paved courtyard. Typically occurring in clusters forming small villages, they are believed to be of Later Iron Age origin, c. 1st century BCE. Examples include Chysauster and Carn Euny.

Fogous

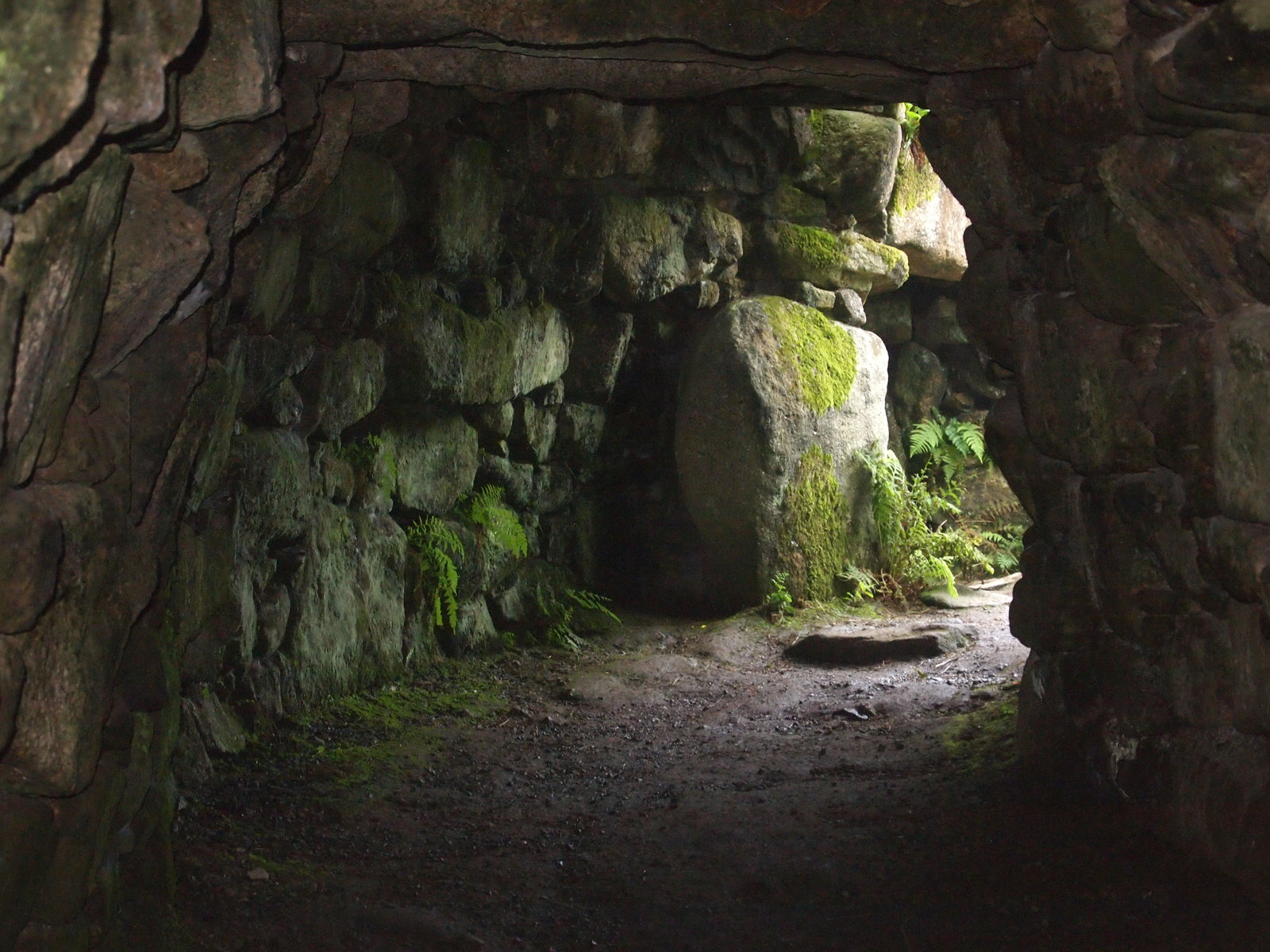
Interior of the fogou at Carn Euny. Fogous may have been used to store beer or dairy products

Fogous, subterranean stone-lined passages and chambers with entrances consisting of granite uprights and large stone lintels, are found mainly in West Penwith and the Meneage district on the Lizard. While some fogous may date back to the 5th century BCE, most are probably of later origin. Fogous are comparable to the underground passages (souterrains) found along the Atlantic Façade in Scotland, Ireland and Brittany, and it has been suggested that they were a component of a shared "western Atlantic identity"." Examples include Carn Euny (Sancreed), Halligye (Mawgan-in-Meneage), Boleigh (St Buryan), Boden (St Anthony-in-Meneage), and Penhale (Fraddon).

Fogous may have been underground storage chambers for food or possessions, ritual centres, or places of refuge. Due to their frequent occurrence in weakly defended or undefended sites, their suitability as places of refuge has been questioned. While the damp atmosphere in fogous would have made them unsuitable for storage of livestock, grain, or metal tools, they may have been suitable for storing dairy products or containers of beer.

==== Pottery ====
The earliest Iron Age pottery in Cornwall (c. 800–600 BCE), including shouldered jars and carinated jars and bowls, is found at Trevelgue Head. This is followed by Plain Jar Group that dates to the Early Iron Age, c. 6th to 4th century BCE. The Plain Jar pottery shows a shift towards a more extensive use of granitic fabrics compared with the preceding period, although gabbroic clay continued to be the primary fabric for pottery production as in the Final Bronze Age period. Around 300 BCE, in the Middle Iron Age, South West Decorated Ware, also known as Glastonbury Ware, emerged as a regional pottery style from Cornwall to the Mendips. This style made less use of granitic fabrics, and by the late Iron Age pottery in Cornwall is almost entirely made from gabbroic clay.

In Cornwall (and a small part of south Devon), South West Decorated Ware evolved into Cordoned Ware in the first century BCE. Cordoned Ware, generally thinner and of better quality than South West Decorated Ware, continued to be made with gabbroic clay. The appearance of Cordoned Ware may have been influenced by ceramics from Armorica, perhaps as a result of trade and cultural links between Cornwall and north west Gaul. Cordoned Ware is undecorated, but gets its name from the addition of horizontal clay strips (cordons). Wheel-thrown pottery has been found in Cornwall from the Late Iron Age, and some examples of Cordoned Ware may have been made with the potter's wheel.

==== Metal ====
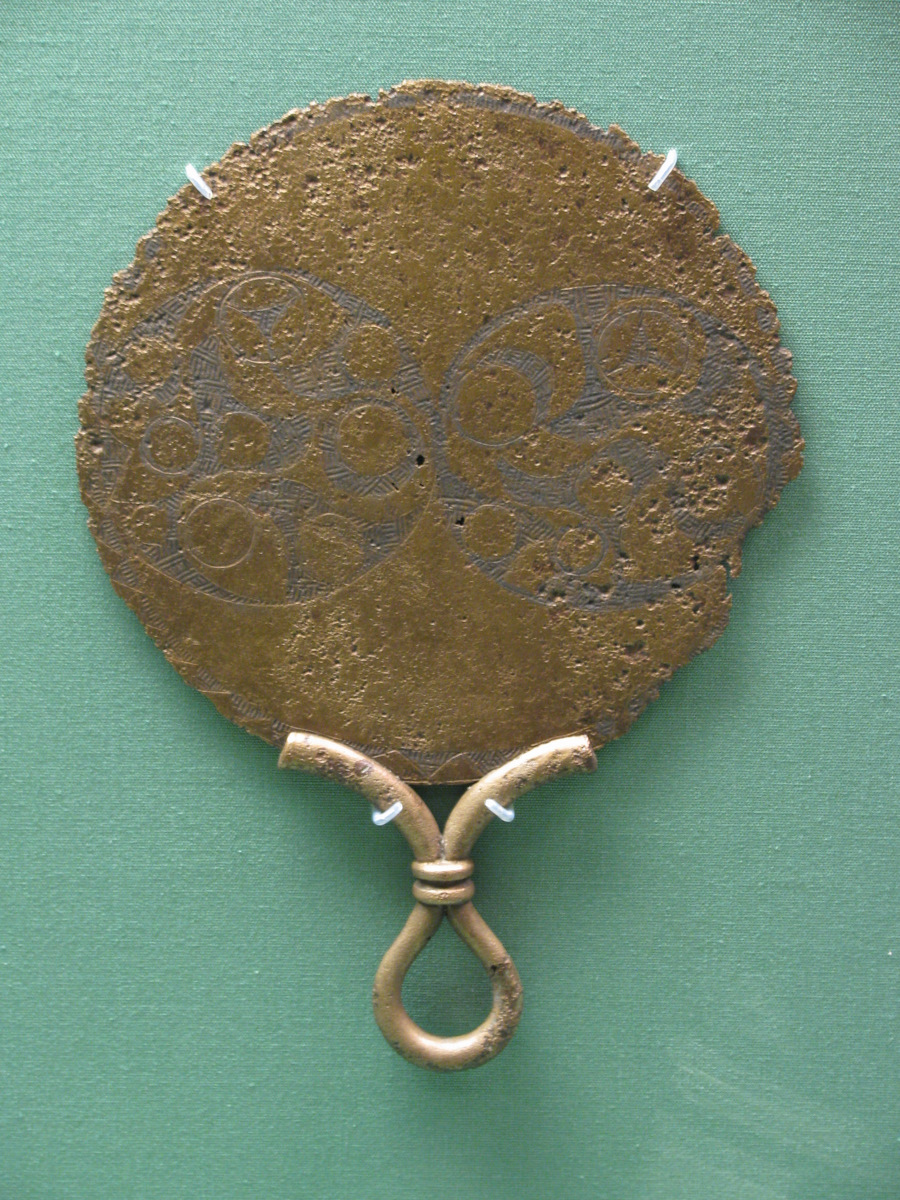
Iron Age mirror from St Keverne

Haematite (iron ore) is found in Cornwall near St Austell, Launceston, and especially the Great Perran Lode near Trevelgue Head, which was a major source for Early Iron Age iron production. Evidence for industrial-scale iron working is found at Trevelgue, and to a lesser extent at the Early Iron Age site at Chûn and the Late Iron Age site at Chysauster. Iron artefacts are rarely preserved due to Cornwall's acidic soils, with the few examples dating to the Late Iron Age.

Artefacts associated with horses and chariots have been found, including a copper alloy cheekpiece from St Ewe, and linchpins for chariot wheel-hubs from St Goran, Trevelgue Head, and Castle Gotha. Decorated La Tène-style scabbard mounts have been discovered at Padstow and Carloggas, Mawgan-in-Pydar. The example from Padstow may have been designed to resemble a horse's head gear.

Two examples of mirrors from Cornwall and the Isles of Scilly comprise a distinct subgroup of the Iron Age Southwestern decorated metal mirrors. An early 1st century BCE mirror found in a cist grave on the island of Bryher, Isles of Scilly, may be one of Britain's earliest examples of this type. Accompanied by a sword and shield, this find has been described as "unique in Western Europe". The grave goods from Bryher, along with other high quality metalwork such as the leaded bronze neck-ring found at Pentire, Newquay, suggest the presence of skilled local artisans.

==== Stone and organic tools ====
During the later Iron Age, rotary querns were introduced alongside the continued use of saddle querns for grain processing. Evidence of textile production includes loom weights and spindle whorls which are found at sites such as Castle Gotha.

=== Ritual ===
The deceased were typically interred in oval or rectangular graves, either individually or more commonly as part of small cemeteries. Distinctive burial traditions ('South Western Cist Burials') are found in Cornwall and Scilly from the Middle Iron Age. This tradition involves placing the dead in a flexed or crouched position, with the head towards the north. While grave goods are uncommon, decorated metal items sometimes accompany burials. Examples include the cist burial at Bryher, Scilly, where grave goods included a sword, shield, and a decorated mirror. In another example, at the Late Iron Age cemetery at Trethellan (c. 200 BCE – 100 CE), the dead were interred wearing clothing and jewellery, including bronze brooches.

=== Subsistence ===
The Iron Age economy was predominantly pastoral, based on cattle and especially sheep, with wool production as a significant sector. Additionally, evidence is found for arable farming, including the cultivation of barley, oats, rye, emmer, and spelt, supported by the finds of quern stones for grain grinding. Some sites feature extensive field systems indicating mixed farming incorporating both crop cultivation and pastoralism.

Analysis of human remains from Iron Age sites such as Harlyn Bay and Trethellan Farm suggest that the diet was rich in animal protein and low in marine foods, despite the proximity of these two sites to the coast where marine resources would have been plentiful.

=== Social organization ===
At least in the Early to Middle Iron Age, hillforts and cliff castles have been interpreted as the dwellings of a dominant cattle-owning elite class who controlled long-distance trade routes and access to land including rights to sheep grazing. It has been suggested that they engaged in patron-client relationships with the lower strata of society, who occupied the smaller enclosed settlements.

Henrietta Quinnell suggests that a significant power shift occurred during the later Iron Age, leading to the end of elite control of hillforts and the transfer of power to the occupants of the smaller enclosed settlements, who then became the new controlling elite. As a result, hillforts may have been repurposed as communal centres. Peter Herring's research in West Penwith similarly indicates a shift from an earlier system consisting of four major power centres (Maen, Bosigran, Trencrom and Lescudjack) to one with eight to ten smaller regions in the later Iron Age, with each region controlled by a ruling elite from a hillfort.

In the Late Iron Age, the household or extended household was probably the main unit of social organization. At this time Cornwall was probably a society of small tribes, with linear earthworks such as the Giant's Hedge possibly demarcating political boundaries between these tribes. Cripps argues that later Iron Age Cornwall may have been a heterarchical society, with a loose system of social stratification that lacked a dominant hierarchical structure, based primarily on small-scale connections between households and extended families.

=== Trade and cultural links ===
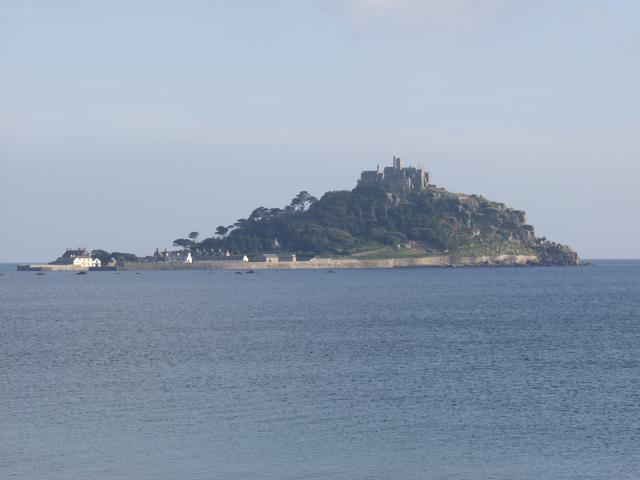
St Michael's Mount, a possible candidate for Ictis, a Late Iron Age tin trading port

In Britain the inhabitants of the promontory called Belerion are particularly friendly to strangers and have become civilized through contacts with merchants from foreign parts ...They prepare the tin, working the ground in which it is produced very carefully ...They beat the metal into masses shaped like astragali and carry it to a certain island lying off Britain called Ictis.

— Diodorus Siculus, Bibliotheca Historica.

The inhabitants of Iron Age Cornwall enthusiastically engaged in trading with merchants, as evidenced by diverse artefact finds, along with some limited and uncertain written accounts. Prior to the Roman conquest of Britain, Cornwall was already participating in long-distance trade networks that included the Eastern Mediterranean, Northern Iberia, and Aquitania. Roman influence and interaction with Cornwall dates to the Late Iron Age, with the tin trade serving as the basis of these interactions.

Trade in South West Britain was mainly based on metal exploitation. The Cassiterides ('Tin Islands') were supposedly a source of tin for Phoenician traders. Ancient sources mention the Cassiterides, islands where tin could be obtained, but their exact location was not recorded. It has been speculated that The Cassiterides may be identified with Cornwall, perhaps the Isles of Scilly. Pytheas of Massilia and Diodorus wrote that tin was traded at 'Ictis', at least in the c. 4th century BCE. Some have suggested that either St Michael's Mount in Mount's Bay or Looe Island may be possible locations for Ictis. Cornwall, particularly the Great Perran Lode near Trevelgue, was a major source of iron ore during the Early Iron Age, Trevelgue traded iron ore with Wessex, and may have been linked to major trade centres such as Hengistbury Head.

Cornwall maintained long-term cultural and trade links with Brittany, evidenced by similarities in their respective material cultures such as fogous, cliff castles, and pottery styles.

Although coins were minted in Britain from the first century BCE, neither the Dumnonii nor the Cornovii minted their own coins. Iron Age coins are very rare in Cornwall, with only a limited number discovered, including a hoard of 50 gold staters found at Carn Brea.

=== Ethnicity ===
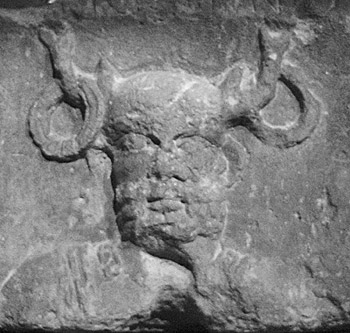
Image of the Celtic god Cernunnos, whose name is one possible origin for the name of Cornwall

The name Cornwall is believed to derive from the Cornovii (Common Brittonic: *kornou̯(i̯)ī) tribe who are generally thought to have inhabited this region during the Iron Age. The tribal name of the Cornovii ultimately derives from Common Brittonic *korn, meaning horn, which may be interpreted either as 'peninsula', or as a reference to a horned animal or the Celtic deity Cernunnos.

It is often suggested that the entire South West Peninsula west of the Parrett and Axe rivers was under the control of the Dumnonii tribe. While it is possible that the Cornovii were a sub-tribe of the Dumnonii, the Tamar may have instead functioned as a territorial boundary, with the Cornovii and Dumnonii operating as independent tribes. The differences observed between Iron Age communities on the west and east sides of the Tamar River imply some degree of separation, but the existence or location of any political boundary between the Cornovii and Dumnonii remains speculative. Peters has suggested that an explicitly Cornish identity was unlikely to have existed in this period, due to a shared language on both sides of the Tamar and the absence of any centralized political authority across the broader South West region.

The existence of a shared Iron Age 'Western Atlantic Identity', comprising the regions of Iberia, western Scotland, Ireland, Brittany, Wales, and Cornwall, has been proposed. This interpretation is based on various similarities in the respective material cultures of these communities, which may be a result of shared trade and cultural contact along the Atlantic Façade, as well as their similar landscapes and shared coastal environment.

=== Genetics ===
By the Iron Age, Early European Farmer ancestry in Southern Britain had increased to c. 36%–38.8% as populations with comparatively higher levels of this component migrated from Europe during the Middle to Late Bronze Age.

A 2022 genetic study analysed the remains of individuals from sites in Iron Age Cornwall that included Harlyn Bay, Trethellan Farm, Tregear Vean, and Tregunnel, resulting in an average ancestry model of c. 13.5% Western Hunter-Gatherer, 36.4% Early European Farmer, and 50.1% Yamnaya-related ancestry. Alternatively using Bronze Age sources, the population of Iron Age Cornwall could be modelled as 60.5% British Chalcolithic to Early Bronze Age ancestry and 39.5% 'Continental' ancestry, representing the migrating groups from the European mainland.

== Bibliography ==
- Allentoft, Morten E.; Sikora, Martin; Refoyo-Martínez, Alba; Irving-Pease, Evan K.; Fischer, Anders; Barrie, William; Ingason, Andrés; Stenderup, Jesper; Sjögren, Karl-Göran; Pearson, Alice; Sousa da Mota, Bárbara; Schulz Paulsson, Bettina; Halgren, Alma; Macleod, Ruairidh; Jørkov, Marie Louise Schjellerup (2024-01-11). "Population genomics of post-glacial western Eurasia". Nature. 625 (7994): 301–311. Bibcode:2024Natur.625..301A. doi:10.1038/s41586-023-06865-0. ISSN 0028-0836. PMC 10781627. PMID 38200295.
- ApSimon, A. M. (1972). "The Excavation of Bronze Age and Iron Age Settlements at Trevisker, St. Eval, Cornwall". Proceedings of the Prehistoric Society. 38: 302–381. doi:10.1017/S0079497X00012160. ISSN 0079-497X. S2CID 131146273.
- Ashbee, Paul (1986). "Ancient Scilly: retrospect, aspect and prospect". Cornish Archaeology. 25: 186–219.
- Bender, Barbara (1997). "Leskernick: Stone Worlds; Alternative Narratives; Nested Landscapes". Proceedings of the Prehistoric Society. 63: 147–178. doi:10.1017/S0079497X00002413. ISSN 0079-497X. S2CID 128438440.
- Berger, Daniel (2019). Zerboni, Andrea (ed.). "Isotope systematics and chemical composition of tin ingots from Mochlos (Crete) and other Late Bronze Age sites in the eastern Mediterranean Sea: An ultimate key to tin provenance?". PLOS ONE. 14 (6) e0218326. Bibcode:2019PLoSO..1418326B. doi:10.1371/journal.pone.0218326. ISSN 1932-6203. PMC 6594607. PMID 31242218.
- Berridge, Peter; Roberts, Alison (1986). "The Mesolithic period in Cornwall". Cornish Archaeology. 25: 7–34.
- Borlase, Mark (2020). Cornwall's trans-peninsular route: socio-economic and cultural continuity across the Camel/Fowey corridor "The Way of Saints" from the Roman period to AD 700 (Thesis). Oxford, UK: BAR Publishing. ISBN 978-1-4073-5476-7.
- Brace, Selina; Diekmann, Yoan; Booth, Thomas J.; van Dorp, Lucy; Faltyskova, Zuzana; Rohland, Nadin; Mallick, Swapan; Olalde, Iñigo; Ferry, Matthew; Michel, Megan; Oppenheimer, Jonas; Broomandkhoshbacht, Nasreen; Stewardson, Kristin; Martiniano, Rui; Walsh, Susan (2019-04-15). "Ancient genomes indicate population replacement in Early Neolithic Britain". Nature Ecology & Evolution. 3 (5): 765–771. Bibcode:2019NatEE...3..765B. doi:10.1038/s41559-019-0871-9. ISSN 2397-334X. PMC 6520225. PMID 30988490.
- Brown, Tony (2008). The Bronze Age climate and environment of Britain.
- Campbell, S.; Gerrard, A. J.; Green, C. P.; Scourse, J. D.; Davey, N. D. W.; Cottle, R. (1998), "Granite landscapes", in Campbell, S.; Hunt, C. O.; Scourse, J. D.; Keen, D. H. (eds.), Quaternary of South-West England, The Geological Conservation Review Series, Dordrecht: Springer Netherlands, pp. 71–127, doi:10.1007/978-94-011-4920-4_4, ISBN 978-94-011-4920-4
- Campbell, Lorrae (2021). The origins of British hillforts: a comparative study of Late Bronze Age hillfort origins in the Atlantic West. OCLC 1285707044.
- Carey, Chris (2019). "The social organisation of metalworking in southern England during the Beaker period and Bronze Age: absence of evidence or evidence of absence?". Internet Archaeology (52). doi:10.11141/ia.52.4. S2CID 166620635.
- Carey, Chris (2022). "Beaker and Early Bronze Age Tin Exploitation in Cornwall: Cassiterite Processing Identified through Microwear and pXRF Analyses". European Journal of Archaeology. 26 (2): 147–167. doi:10.1017/eaa.2022.30. ISSN 1461-9571. S2CID 251973046.
- Charlton, Sophy; Brace, Selina; Hajdinjak, Mateja; Kearney, Rebecca; Booth, Thomas; Reade, Hazel; Tripp, Jennifer A.; Sayle, Kerry L.; Grimm, Sonja B.; Bello, Silvia M.; Walker, Elizabeth A.; Gilardet, Alexandre; East, Philip; Glocke, Isabelle; Larson, Greger (2022). "Dual ancestries and ecologies of the Late Glacial Palaeolithic in Britain". Nature Ecology & Evolution. 6 (11): 1658–1668. Bibcode:2022NatEE...6.1658C. doi:10.1038/s41559-022-01883-z. ISSN 2397-334X. PMC 9630104. PMID 36280785.
- Christie, Patricia M. (1986). "Cornwall in the Bronze Age". Cornish Archaeology. 25: 81–110.
- Clark, Peter (2009). Bronze Age connections: cultural contact in prehistoric Europe. Oxford: Oxbow Books. ISBN 978-1-78297-316-4. OCLC 880878675.
- Cole, Dick (2003). "Journeys to the Rock". Cornish Archaeology. 40–41: 107–143.
- Conneller, Chantal (2021). The Mesolithic in Britain: Landscape and Society in Times of Change (1 ed.). London: Routledge. doi:10.4324/9781003228103. ISBN 978-1-003-22810-3.
- Cooper, Anwen (2022). "Grave goods: objects and death in later prehistoric Britain". Archaeology Data Service. doi:10.5284/1052206.
- Copley, M. S. (2005). "Processing of milk products in pottery vessels through British prehistory". Antiquity. 79 (306): 895–908. doi:10.1017/S0003598X00115029. ISSN 0003-598X. S2CID 162714361.
- "Cornwall and Isles of Scilly Historic Environment Record - Cornwall Council". www.cornwall.gov.uk.
- Cripps, Laura J. (2006). In Time and Space: Spatiotemporal Relations, Community, and Identity in Cornwall, 400 BC - AD 200 (Thesis).
- Cummings, Vicki (2017). The Neolithic of Britain and Ireland. Routledge archaeology of Northern Europe. Abingdon, Oxon, UK: Routledge. ISBN 978-1-138-85716-2.
- Cunliffe, Barry (2010). Iron age communities in Britain: an account of England, Scotland and Wales from the seventh century BC until the Roman conquest (4. ed., 1. publ. in paperback ed.). London: Routledge. ISBN 978-0-203-32605-3.
- Dark, Petra (2006). "Climate deterioration and land-use change in the first millennium BC: perspectives from the British palynological record". Journal of Archaeological Science. 33 (10): 1381–1395. Bibcode:2006JArSc..33.1381D. doi:10.1016/j.jas.2006.01.009.
- Davies, Simon R. (2010). Early Neolithic tor enclosures of south-western England (Thesis).
- Dyer, James (2002). Ancient Britain. Routledge. ISBN 978-0-203-44216-6.
- Ehrenreich, Robert M. (1985). Trade, Technology and the Ironworking Community in the Iron Age of Southern Britain. Ann Arbor, MI: University of Michigan Press. doi:10.30861/9780860543565. ISBN 978-0-86054-356-5.
- Ehser, Anja (2011). "Provenance of the gold of the Early Bronze Age Nebra Sky Disk, central Germany: geochemical characterization of natural gold from Cornwall". European Journal of Mineralogy. 23 (6): 895–910. Bibcode:2011EJMin..23..895E. doi:10.1127/0935-1221/2011/0023-2140. ISSN 0935-1221.
- Fokkens, Harry; Harding, Anthony Filmer (2013). The Oxford handbook of the European Bronze Age. Oxford handbooks. Oxford: Oxford university press. ISBN 978-0-19-957286-1.
- Garbett, Geoffrey George (2013). Holocene Environmental History and Palaeoecology of the Lizard Peninsula, Cornwall (Thesis). doi:10.21954/OU.RO.0000F111.
- Gearey, B. R.; Charman, D. J.; Kent, M. (2000). "Palaeoecological Evidence for the Prehistoric Settlement of Bodmin Moor, Cornwall, Southwest England. Part I: The Status of Woodland and Early Human Impacts". Journal of Archaeological Science. 27 (5): 423–438. Bibcode:2000JArSc..27..423G. doi:10.1006/jasc.1999.0472. ISSN 0305-4403.
- Gearey, B. R. (2000). "Palaeoecological Evidence for the Prehistoric Settlement of Bodmin Moor, Cornwall, southwest England. Part II: Land Use Changes from the Neolithic to the Present". Journal of Archaeological Science. 27 (6): 493–508. Bibcode:2000JArSc..27..493G. doi:10.1006/jasc.1999.0469.
- Gibson, Alex M.; Woods, Ann (1990). Prehistoric pottery for the archaeologist (1. publ ed.). Leicester [England] New York: Leicester University Press. ISBN 978-0-7185-1274-3.
- Gossip, James (2008). "A Bronze Age roundhouse at Carnon Gate, Feock". Cornish Archaeology. 47: 101–115.
- Gossip, James (2010). "Excavations at Tremough, Penryn, Cornwall, 2000–6". Cornish Archaeology. 48–49: 1–66.
- Gossip, James (2012). "Early Neolithic activity and an Iron Age settlement at Penmayne, Rock, St Minver". Cornish Archaeology. 51: 165–189.
- Grinsell, Leslie (1994). Butcher, Sarnia (ed.). "Round barrows and burials of the 'Wessex' Earlier Bronze Age in Cornwall" (PDF). Cornish Archaeology. 33. Cornwall Archaeological Society: 36–39.
- Harrad, Lucy (2004). "Gabbroic clay sources in Cornwall: a petrographic study of prehistoric pottery and clay samples". Oxford Journal of Archaeology. 23 (3): 271–286. doi:10.1111/j.1468-0092.2004.00212.x. ISSN 0262-5253.
- Haustein, M. (2010). "Tin isotopy-a new method for solving old questions". Archaeometry. 52 (5): 816–832. doi:10.1111/j.1475-4754.2010.00515.x.
- Moore, Tom; Haselgrove, Colin, eds. (2017). The later iron age in Britain and beyond. Oxford: Oxbow Books. ISBN 978-1-78570-910-4.
- Henderson, Jon C. (2011). The Atlantic Iron Age: settlement and identity in the first millennium BC (1. issued in paperback ed.). London: Routledge. ISBN 978-0-203-93846-1.
- Herring, Peter; Lewis, Barry (1992). "Ploughing up gatherer-hunters. Mesolithic and later flints from Butterstor and elsewhere on Bodmin Moor". Cornish Archaeology (31): 5–14.
- Herring, Peter (2008). "Commons, fields and communities in prehistoric Cornwall". In Chadwick, Adrian M. (ed.). Recent approaches to the archaeology of land allotment. Oxford: Archaeopress. pp. 70–95. ISBN 978-1-4073-0355-0. OCLC 298595985.
- Herring, Peter (2011). "The Cornish landscape". Cornish Archaeology. 50: 161–174.
- Herring, Peter (2016). "A tomb for the living: Grumbla cromlech, the Giant's Chair, Sancreed". Cornish Archaeology. 55: 119–133.
- Herring, Peter (2023), The making of West Penwith's seminatural environment
- Hill, J. D. (1995). "The Pre-Roman Iron Age in Britain and Ireland (ca. 800 B.C. to A.D. 100): An Overview". Journal of World Prehistory. 9 (1): 47–98. doi:10.1007/BF02221003. ISSN 0892-7537. JSTOR 25801071.
- M. Jacobi, Roger; Wessex Archaeology (2014). "Palaeolithic and Mesolithic Lithic Artefact (PaMELA) database". Archaeology Data Service. doi:10.5284/1028201.
- Jay, Mandy; Richards, Michael P. (2007). "British Iron Age Diet: Stable Isotopes and Other Evidence". Proceedings of the Prehistoric Society. 73: 169–190. doi:10.1017/S0079497X0002733X. ISSN 0079-497X.
- Johns, Charles (2011). "Ancient Scilly: the last 25 years" (PDF). Cornish Archaeology. 50: 187–196.
- Johnson, Nicholas (2013). Bodmin Moor: an archaeological survey. Volume 1, The human landscape to c.1800. Peter Rose, Desmond Bonney, Anne Carter, English Heritage. Swindon: English Heritage. ISBN 978-1-84802-137-2. OCLC 1178763977.
- Jones, Andy M. (2005). "Settlement and ceremony: archaeological investigations at Stannon Down, St Breward, Cornwall". Cornish Archaeology. 43–44: 1–140.
- Jones, Andy M. (2005a). Cornish Bronze Age ceremonial landscapes c. 2500–1500 BC. Oxford: Archaeopress. ISBN 1-84171-856-4. OCLC 62088553.
- Jones, Andy M. (2006). "Cornish Beakers: new discoveries and perspectives". Cornish Archaeology. 45: 31–69.
- Jones, Andy M. (2006a). "Monuments and Memories Set in Stone: a Cornish Bronze Age Ceremonial Complex in its Landscape (on Stannon Down)". Proceedings of the Prehistoric Society. 72: 341–365. doi:10.1017/S0079497X00000888. ISSN 0079-497X. S2CID 128833472.
- Jones, Andy M. (2006b). "By land, sea and air: an Early Neolithic pit group at Portscatho, Cornwall, and consideration of coastal activity during the Neolithic". Cornish Archaeology. 45: 1–30.
- Jones, Andy M. (2010a). "Excavation of a barrow on Constantine Island, St Merryn, Cornwall". Cornish Archaeology. 48–49: 67–97.
- Jones, Andy M. (2010b). Scarcewater, Pennance, Cornwall: archaeological excavation of a Bronze Age and Roman landscape. ISBN 978-1-4073-2186-8. OCLC 1198082429.
- Jones, Andy M. (2011). "The Neolithic and Bronze Age in Cornwall, c 4000 cal BC to c 1000 cal BC: an overview of recent developments" (PDF). Cornish Archaeology. 50: 197–229.
- Jones, Andy M. (2011a). "On the Beach: New Discoveries at Harlyn Bay, Cornwall". Proceedings of the Prehistoric Society. 77: 89–109. doi:10.1017/S0079497X00000645. ISSN 0079-497X. S2CID 98790366.
- Jones, Andy M. (2011b). "Bosiliack: A Later Prehistoric Settlement in West Penwith, Cornwall and its Context". Archaeological Journal. 168 (1): 96–132. doi:10.1080/00665983.2011.11020830. ISSN 0066-5983. S2CID 164025989.
- Jones, Andy M. (2012). Reflections on the past, essays in honour of Frances Lynch. pp. 173–193.
- Jones, Andy M. (2012a). "A Beaker structure and other discoveries along the Sennen to Porthcurno South West Water pipeline". Cornish Archaeology. 51: 1–67.
- Jones, Andy M.; Lawson-Jones, Anna; Quinnell, Henrietta; Tyacke, Anna; Hill, Graham; Tapper, Bryn; Taylor, Roger (2013). "Landscapes of Stone: Contextualizing Greenstone Working and Lithics from Clodgy Moor, West Penwith, Cornwall". Archaeological Journal. 170 (1): 2–29. doi:10.1080/00665983.2013.11021000. ISSN 0066-5983.
- Jones, Andy M. (2013c). "From Landscape to Portable Art: The Changing Settings of Simple Rock Art in South-West Britain and its Wider Context". European Journal of Archaeology. 16 (4): 636–659. doi:10.1179/1461957113Y.0000000039. S2CID 162239699.
- Jones, Andy M. (2014). "Metalworking in the roundhouse: some recent finds from Cornwall". Past. 77: 15–16.
- Jones, Andy M. (2014a). Lines of archaeological investigation along the north Cornish coast. Henrietta Quinnell. Oxford, England: Archaeopress. ISBN 978-1-4073-1248-4. OCLC 876583768.
- Jones, Andy M. (2015), SAMPLING AT VIADUCT FARM, POLSTRONG, CORNWALL: IDENTIFYING THE SOURCE OF GROUP XVI GREENSTONES
- Jones, Andy M. (2015a). Settlement and metalworking in the Middle Bronze Age and beyond: new evidence from Tremough, Cornwall. Leiden: Sidestone Press. ISBN 978-90-8890-294-9. OCLC 935324170.
- Jones, Andy M. (2015b). "An incised Mesolithic pebble from Trevose Head, St Merryn, Cornwall". Cornish Archaeology. 54: 219–223.
- Jones, Andy M. (2015c). "A Late Bronze Age pit, burnt bone and stones at Manuels, Quintrell Downs, Newquay, Cornwall". Cornish Archaeology. 54: 193–204.
- Jones, Andy M. (2015d). "Archaeological investigations of Late Iron Age settlement at Sir James Smith's Community School, Camelford, Cornwall, 2008–9". Cornish Archaeology. 54: 1–87.
- Jones, Andy M. (2016b). "A Mesolithic pit at Penans Farm, Grampound, Cornwall". Cornish Archaeology. 55: 241–248.
- Jones, Andy M.; Goskar, Thomas (2017). "Hendraburnick 'Quoit': recording and dating rock art in the west of Britain". Time and Mind. 10 (3): 277–292. doi:10.1080/1751696X.2017.1341241. ISSN 1751-696X.
- Jones, Andy M. (2019). "Excavations at the North Cliffs 2016: investigating Mesolithic flint scatters in Hudder Field". Cornish Archaeology. 58: 1–26.
- Jones, Andy M. (2020). "Beneath the sands: a placed Beaker pit deposit at Tyringham Road, Lelant, Cornwall". Cornish Archaeology. 59: 145–157.
- Jones, Andy M., ed. (2021). Later prehistoric settlement in Cornwall and the Isles of Scilly: evidence from five excavations. ARCHAEOPRESS. ISBN 978-1-78969-958-6. OCLC 1284980685.
- Keen, D. H.; Campbell, S. (1998), "The Quaternary history of the Dorset, south Devon and Cornish coasts", in Campbell, S.; Hunt, C. O.; Scourse, J. D.; Keen, D. H. (eds.), Quaternary of South-West England, The Geological Conservation Review Series, Dordrecht: Springer Netherlands, pp. 155–189, doi:10.1007/978-94-011-4920-4_6, ISBN 978-94-011-4920-4
- King, Martin P. (2003). Unparalleled Behaviour: Britain and Ireland during the 'Mesolithic' and 'Neolithic'. Ann Arbor, MI: University of Michigan Press. doi:10.30861/9781841715360. ISBN 978-1-84171-536-0.
- Kipfer, Barbara Ann (2021). Encyclopedic Dictionary of Archaeology. Cham: Springer International Publishing. doi:10.1007/978-3-030-58292-0. ISBN 978-3-030-58291-3.
- Kirkham, Graeme (2011). "11. Something different at the Land's End". Beyond the Core: Reflections on Regionality in Prehistory. Oxbow Books. pp. 101–111. ISBN 978-1-84217-989-5 – via Open Library.
- Knüsel, Christopher; Smith, Martin J., eds. (2019). The Routledge handbook of the bioarchaeology of human conflict (First issued in paperback ed.). London New York: Routledge, Taylor & Francis Group. ISBN 978-0-415-84219-8.
- Krauß, Raiko (2021). "An Early Bronze Age Burial with a Golden Spiral Ring from Ammerbuch-Reusten, Southwestern Germany". Praehistorische Zeitschrift (in German). 96 (2): 434–443. doi:10.1515/pz-2021-0010. ISSN 1613-0804. S2CID 234795039.
- Laing, Lloyd R. (1968). "A Greek Tin Trade with Cornwall?". Cornish Archaeology. 7: 15–23.
- Laycock, Stuart (2012). Britannia: The Failed State. The History Press. ISBN 978-0-7524-8765-6.
- MacLean, Rachel (1992). "The Fogou: An Investigation of Function". Cornish Archaeology. 31: 41–64.
- Marchi, Nina; Winkelbach, Laura; Schulz, Ilektra; Brami, Maxime; Hofmanová, Zuzana; Blöcher, Jens; Reyna-Blanco, Carlos S.; Diekmann, Yoan; Thiéry, Alexandre; Kapopoulou, Adamandia; Link, Vivian; Piuz, Valérie; Kreutzer, Susanne; Figarska, Sylwia M.; Ganiatsou, Elissavet (2022). "The genomic origins of the world's first farmers". Cell. 185 (11): 1842–1859.e18. doi:10.1016/j.cell.2022.04.008. PMC 9166250. PMID 35561686.
- Markham (1998), Geochemical Fingerprinting of West Cornish Greenstones As An Aid To Provenancing Neolithic Axes
- Mattingly, J. (2009). "Five gold rings? – Early Bronze Age gold lunulae from Cornwall". Royal Institution of Cornwall Journal: 95–114.
- Mercer, R. J. (1970). "The Excavation of a Bronze Age Hut-Circle Settlement, Stannon Down, St. Breward, Cornwall, 1968". Cornish Archaeology. 9: 17–46.
- Mercer, Roger (1986). "The Neolithic in Cornwall". Cornish Archaeology. 25: 35–80.
- Miles, David (1982). The Romano-British Countryside.
- Needham, Stuart (2006). The Ringlemere cup: precious cups and the beginning of the Channel Bronze Age. London: British Museum. ISBN 978-0-86159-163-3. OCLC 76901188.
- Nowakowski, Jacqueline A. (1991). "Trethellan Farm, Newquay: the excavation of a lowland Bronze Age settlement and Iron Age cemetery". Cornish Archaeology. 30: 5–243.
- Nowakowski, Jacqueline A. (2007). "Return to Gwithian: shifting the sands of time". Cornish Archaeology. 46: 13–90.
- Nowakowski, Jacqueline A. (2011). "Appraising the bigger picture – Cornish Iron Age and Romano-British lives and settlements 25 years on" (PDF). Cornish Archaeology. 50: 241–262.
- Olalde, Iñigo; Brace, Selina; Allentoft, Morten E.; Armit, Ian; Kristiansen, Kristian; Booth, Thomas; Rohland, Nadin; Mallick, Swapan; Szécsényi-Nagy, Anna; Mittnik, Alissa; Altena, Eveline; Lipson, Mark; Lazaridis, Iosif; Harper, Thomas K.; Patterson, Nick (2018-03-08). "The Beaker phenomenon and the genomic transformation of northwest Europe". Nature. 555 (7695): 190–196. Bibcode:2018Natur.555..190O. doi:10.1038/nature25738. ISSN 0028-0836. PMC 5973796. PMID 29466337.
- Papac, Luka; Ernée, Michal; Dobeš, Miroslav; Langová, Michaela; Rohrlach, Adam B.; Aron, Franziska; Neumann, Gunnar U.; Spyrou, Maria A.; Rohland, Nadin; Velemínský, Petr; Kuna, Martin; Brzobohatá, Hana; Culleton, Brendan; Daněček, David; Danielisová, Alžběta (2021-08-27). "Dynamic changes in genomic and social structures in third millennium BCE central Europe". Science Advances. 7 (35). Bibcode:2021SciA....7.6941P. doi:10.1126/sciadv.abi6941. ISSN 2375-2548. PMC 8386934. PMID 34433570.
- Parfitt, Simon A.; Ashton, Nick M.; Lewis, Simon G.; Abel, Richard L.; Coope, G. Russell; Field, Mike H.; Gale, Rowena; Hoare, Peter G.; Larkin, Nigel R.; Lewis, Mark D.; Karloukovski, Vassil; Maher, Barbara A.; Peglar, Sylvia M.; Preece, Richard C.; Whittaker, John E. (2010). "Early Pleistocene human occupation at the edge of the boreal zone in northwest Europe". Nature. 466 (7303): 229–233. Bibcode:2010Natur.466..229P. doi:10.1038/nature09117. ISSN 0028-0836. PMID 20613840.
- Patterson, Nick (2022). "Large-scale migration into Britain during the Middle to Late Bronze Age". Nature. 601 (7894): 588–594. Bibcode:2022Natur.601..588P. doi:10.1038/s41586-021-04287-4. ISSN 1476-4687. PMC 8889665. PMID 34937049.
- Payton, Philip J. (1996). Cornwall. Fowey, Cornwall: Alexander Associates. ISBN 978-1-899526-60-4.
- Pérez-Fernández, Marta (2013). "A paleoecological approach to understand the impact of coastal changes on past societies. Using the Isles of Scilly as a case study". Quaternary International. 279–280: 375. doi:10.1016/j.quaint.2012.08.1155. ISSN 1040-6182.
- Peters, Caradoc (2005). The archaeology of Cornwall: the foundations of our society. Cornwall: Cornwall Editions. ISBN 978-1-904880-13-4.
- Quinnell, Henrietta (1986). "Cornwall during the Iron Age and the Roman period". Cornish Archaeology. 25: 111–134.
- Quinnell, Henrietta (2011). "A summary of Cornish ceramics in the first millennium BC". Cornish Archaeology. 50: 231–240.
- Quinnell, Henrietta (2012). "Trevisker Pottery: some recent studies". Cambrian Archaeological Association Monographs. 4. doi:10.5284/1091075.
- Ravensdale, Jack (1984). National Trust Histories Cornwall. Willow Books. ISBN 0-00-218059-6.
- Rippon, Stephen; Gould, David (2021-03-23), "Regional Identities in the Roman Period", Roman and Medieval Exeter and their Hinterlands, Oxbow Books, pp. 45–102
- Rivet, Albert Lionel Frederick; Smith, Colin (1979). The place-names of Roman Britain. Princeton, N.J: Princeton University Press. ISBN 978-0-691-03953-4.
- Robinson, Gary (2007). The prehistoric island landscape of Scilly. Archaeopress. ISBN 978-1-4073-0145-7. OCLC 190776776.
- Schrijver, Peter (1995). Studies in British celtic historical phonology. Rodopi. ISBN 90-5183-820-4. OCLC 644836331.
- Shaw, Ian, ed. (1999). A dictionary of archaeology. Oxford, UK Malden, Mass: Blackwell Publishers. ISBN 978-0-631-17423-3.
- Smith, George (1996). "Archaeology and Environment of a Bronze Age Cairn and Prehistoric and Romano-British Field System at Chysauster, Gulval, near Penzance, Cornwall". Proceedings of the Prehistoric Society. 62: 167–219. doi:10.1017/S0079497X00002784. ISSN 0079-497X. S2CID 130570610.
- Snyder, Christopher Allen (2003). The Britons. The peoples of Europe (1. publ ed.). Malden, Mass.: Blackwell. ISBN 978-0-631-22260-6.
- Standish, Christopher D. (2015). "A Non-local Source of Irish Chalcolithic and Early Bronze Age Gold". Proceedings of the Prehistoric Society. 81: 149–177. doi:10.1017/ppr.2015.4. ISSN 0079-497X. S2CID 132293252.
- Steele, Philip (1988). "Backed Flint Blades from Bodwannick, Lanivet". Cornish Archaeology. 27: 200–201.
- Straker, Vanessa (2011). "Science and archaeology". Cornish Archaeology. 50: 175–186.
- Thomas, Siân Alyce (2018). On the edge of empire: society in the south-west of England during the first century BC to fifth century AD (Thesis).
- Thomas, Julian (2022). "Neolithization and Population Replacement in Britain: An Alternative View". Cambridge Archaeological Journal. 32 (3): 507–525. doi:10.1017/S0959774321000639. ISSN 0959-7743.
- Tilley, Christopher (1995). "Rocks as resources: landscapes and power". Cornish Archaeology. 34: 5–57.
- Tilley, Christopher (1996). "The powers of rocks: Topography and monument construction on Bodmin Moor". World Archaeology. 28 (2): 161–176. doi:10.1080/00438243.1996.9980338. ISSN 0043-8243.
- Timberlake, Simon (2017). "New ideas on the exploitation of copper, tin, gold, and lead ores in Bronze Age Britain: The mining, smelting, and movement of metal". Materials and Manufacturing Processes. 32 (7–8): 709–727. doi:10.1080/10426914.2016.1221113. ISSN 1042-6914. S2CID 138178474.
- Tyacke, Anna (2003). "Chariots of fire: symbols and motifs on recent Iron Age metalwork finds in Cornwall". Cornish Archaeology. 41–42: 144–148.
- Van de Noort, Robert (2014). "Morgawr : an experimental Bronze Age-type sewn-plank craft based on the Ferriby boats: Morgawr: an experimental Bronze Age-type craft". International Journal of Nautical Archaeology. 43 (2): 292–313. doi:10.1111/1095-9270.12058. hdl:10871/15368. S2CID 16985947.
- Webster, C. J. (2008). The archaeology of south west England : South West Archaeological Research Framework: resource assessment and research agenda. Taunton: Somerset Heritage Service. ISBN 978-0-86183-392-4. OCLC 233263683.
- Whitehead, Paul F. (1973). "Neolithic and Upper Palaeolithic working sites, Booby's Bay, Cornwall". Cornish Archaeology. 12: 5–18.
- Whittle, Alasdair W. R.; Healy, Frances; Bayliss, Alexandra (2011). Gathering time: dating the early Neolithic enclosures of southern Britain and Ireland. Oxford Oakville, CT: Oxbow Books. ISBN 978-1-84217-425-8.}
- Whittle, Alasdair; Pollard, Joshua; Greaney, Susan (2023). Ancient DNA and the European Neolithic: relations and descent. Neolithic Studies Group seminar papers. Oxford: Oxbow Books. ISBN 978-1-78925-910-0.
- Wymer, John J. (1999). The lower Palaeolithic occupation of Britain. Salisbury: Wessex Archaeology. ISBN 978-1-874350-29-3.
