= Cornish Bronze Age =

Period of Cornish history from c. 2400 until c. 800 BCE

- Geographical range: Cornwall, including the Isles of Scilly
- Period: Bronze Age Britain, Atlantic Bronze Age
- Dates: c. 2400 BCE–800 BCE
- Major sites: Rillaton, Trevisker, Gwithian, Harlyn Bay, Trethellan Farm, Bosiliack, Leskernick Hill
- Characteristics: Trevisker ware pottery, tin and gold extraction, entrance graves, tor enclosures, hollow-set roundhouses
- Followed by: Cornish Iron Age

The Cornish Bronze Age is an era of the prehistory of Cornwall that spanned the period from c. 2400 BCE to c. 800 BCE. It was preceded by the Cornish Neolithic, and followed by the Cornish Iron Age. It is characterized by the introduction and widespread use of copper and copper-alloy (bronze) weapons and tools.

Significant social and economic changes occurred in Cornwall over the course of the Bronze Age. The earliest stage coincided with the arrival of the Bell Beaker culture, the adoption of new ceramic styles, innovations in ritual and funerary customs, and the earliest evidence for exploitation of local tin and gold resources. Throughout the Early Bronze Age, the main focus was on ritual activity and the construction of ceremonial monuments in the uplands, with the few known domestic buildings being relatively fragile and temporary structures. This changed in the Middle Bronze Age, with a decline in monument construction, the expansion of livestock and arable farming, and a pronounced increase in the number of settlements, which by this stage consisted of much more substantial roundhouses. At the beginning of the Late Bronze Age, there was an apparent abandonment of upland settlements, a change in lowland roundhouse construction technique, and a change in pottery style, suggesting increasing influence from South-Central Britain.

Cornwall was part of an extensive trade and cultural network from at least the Early Bronze Age, exchanging goods and ideas with the communities along the Atlantic Façade, the Wessex culture, and to a lesser extent more distant societies in Central Europe and the Eastern Mediterranean. Trevisker Ware ceramics from Cornwall were transported to other parts of southern Britain, and the style was copied by potters in Ireland and Brittany. Cornwall was an important source for tin and gold in the Bronze Age, and is the most likely provenance for these metals in a substantial number of artefacts and semi-finished products found from this period in the rest of Britain, Ireland, Germany, and the Middle East.

== Chronology ==
The Bronze Age is defined by the widespread adoption of bronze, an alloy of tin and copper which is found in Britain and Ireland from c. 2200–2100 BCE. The Bronze Age ends around the early to mid first millennium BCE, at which point ironworking is introduced, followed by a substantial decrease and eventual collapse in the production, circulation, and use of bronze tools and weapons and the beginning of the Iron Age. Bronze Age Britain and Ireland is usually dated to c. 2150–800 BCE, subdivided into Early Bronze Age (EBA, c. 2150–1600 BCE), Middle Bronze Age (MBA, c. 1600–1150 BCE) and Late Bronze Age (LBA, c. 1150-800/600 BCE). Recent reviews have tended to include the Chalcolithic ('copper-using', or 'Beaker') phase with the Early Bronze Age.

In 1986, Patricia Christie outlined a chronology of the Cornish Bronze Age based on Colin Burgess's thirteen industrial stages, but with different regional type-find names. Christie divided the Bronze Age into an 'earlier' and a 'later' stage with c. 1300 BCE as the point of division.

Major period	Stage	cal BCE
Final Neolithic	Copper-using (Burgess I-III)	2700-2100
Early Bronze Age	Harlyn (Burgess IV)	2100-1400
Early Bronze Age	Trenovissick (Burgess V-VI)	2100-1400
Early Bronze Age	Plymstock (Burgess VII)	2100-1400
Middle Bronze Age	Chagford (Burgess VIII)	1500-1000
Middle Bronze Age	Taunton I + II (Burgess IX)	1500-1000
Middle Bronze Age	Taunton/Worth (Burgess IX)	1500-1000
Middle Bronze Age	Worth/Penard (Burgess X)	1500-1000
Late Bronze Age	Dainton/Wilburton (Burgess XI)	1000-600
Late Bronze Age	Stogursey/Ewart Park (Burgess XII)	1000-600
Late Bronze Age	Mountbatten/Llynfawr (Burgess XIII)	1000-600

In 2011, Andy Jones outlined an alternative chronology based on modern radiocarbon dating, starting with the Cornish Bell Beaker-using period. Jones explains that Christie's 1986 chronology predates the development of high-precision accelerator mass spectrometry. Radiocarbon dating of metal associated contexts now gives a slightly different set of dates:

Major period	cal BCE
Beaker-using	2400–1700
Early Bronze Age	2050-1500
Middle Bronze Age	1500-1100
Late Bronze Age	1100-700

== Overview ==
=== Summary ===
The changes that occurred around the start of the Bronze Age in Cornwall were probably the result of a combination of factors. Cornwall's geographical location connected it to communities on the Atlantic Façade in Ireland, Wales, and Brittany, while at the same time linking it with Devon and Wessex in southern Britain. Genetic studies and bone isotope analysis demonstrate long-distance movement both within Britain and from the European mainland at this time, perhaps initially motivated by the search for metals. Travel to and from Cornwall may have led to the spread of a range of ideas and beliefs, as communities in Cornwall interacted with people from distant places, bringing new monument styles and ideologies that would have been interpreted within a framework of previously existing knowledge and practices.

==== Bell Beaker period (c. 2400–1700 BCE) ====
The Bell Beaker complex expanded to Britain and Ireland by c. 2450 BCE, bringing new ceramic forms ('Beakers') and burial practices, around the same time as the earliest known metal artefacts in Britain. The spread of the Beaker culture to Britain is associated with the migration of people from mainland Europe, possibly from somewhere in the vicinity of the Lower Rhine. These people carried substantial levels of Yamnaya-related ancestry in their DNA, and are believed to have replaced a minimum of 90% of the British Neolithic gene pool within a few hundred years.

Bell Beaker culture was probably introduced to Cornwall from further east in Britain, rather than directly from the European mainland. Evidence for Bell Beaker activity is relatively scarce in Cornwall compared to other parts of Britain, and most of the Beaker pottery found here is relatively late, usually in coastal areas, and mainly found in the west. The introduction of Beakers into Cornwall is roughly contemporaneous with increased monument construction and changes in ritual and burial customs, but there is no evidence that Beakers were associated with these. Beaker-period burials in Cornwall are typically cremations, rather than the single-inhumation graves that are associated with Beaker burials in the rest of Britain. Andy Jones argues that the small number of Beaker artefacts found in Cornwall in this period implies that an invasion or large scale migration is unlikely.

==== Early Bronze Age (c. 2050–1500 BCE) ====
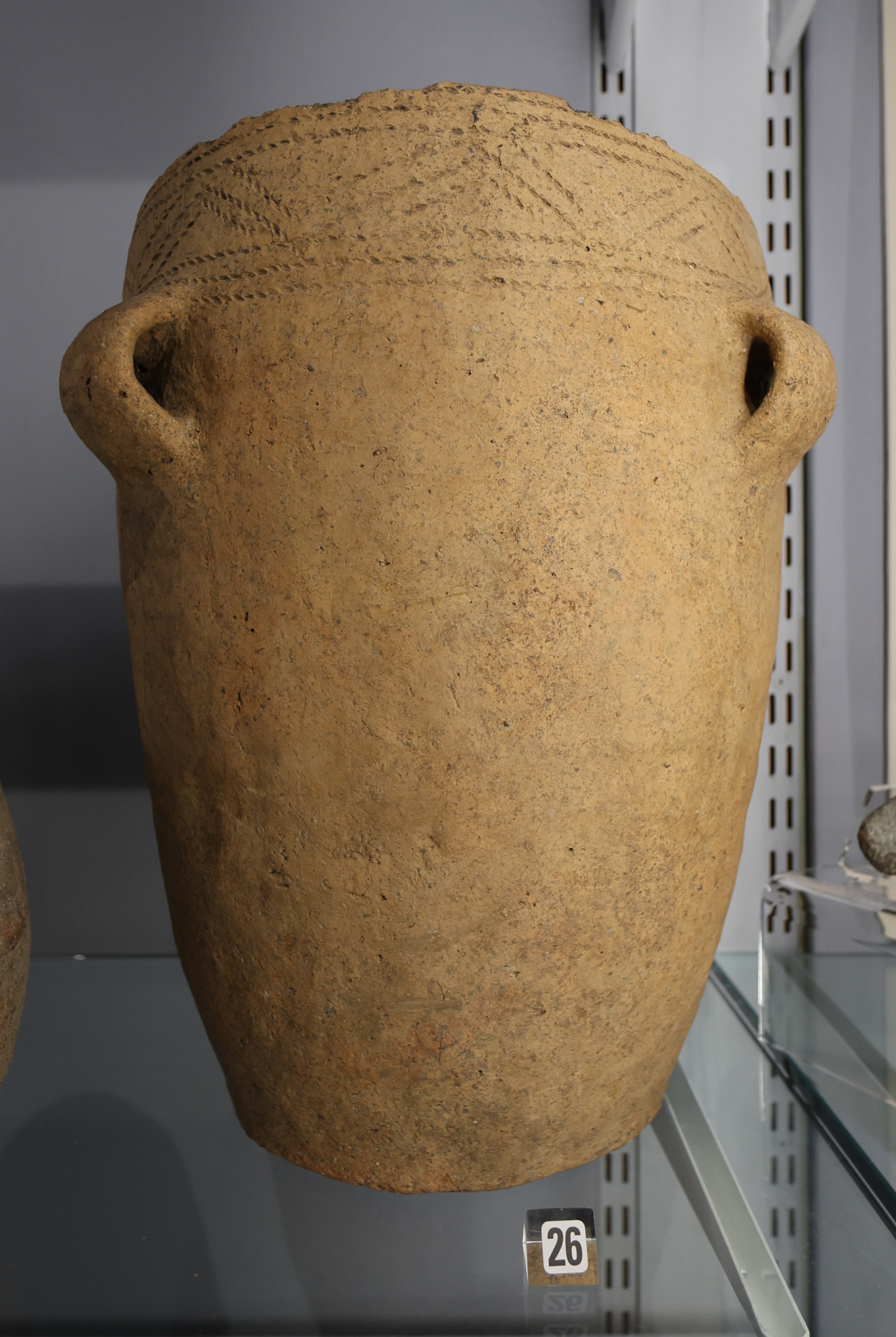
An example of Trevisker Ware found near Gerrans

Settlements were probably restricted to uplands and coastal areas during the Early Bronze Age, and direct evidence for domestic structures is very rare. The main focus seems to have been monument construction, which was at its peak during this period, and thousands of barrows and cairns, numerous stone circles and stone rows, and the entrance graves (in Scilly and West Penwith) were mainly built between c. 2000 and 1500 BCE.

Gold and tin extraction very likely began before the beginning of the second millennium BCE in Cornwall, and analysis of artefactual material suggests that Cornish metals were likely to have been exported to the rest of Britain and Ireland, the European mainland, and as far as the Eastern Mediterranean. Cultural and economic links between Cornwall and other communities on the Atlantic façade in the Early Bronze Age is demonstrated by similar burial practices, such as the entrance graves of West Penwith and Scilly, and metalwork finds such as the four Cornish gold lunulae, a high-status artefact which originated in Ireland.

New pottery styles originated c. 2000 BCE, such as Food Vessels, Collared Urns, and especially Trevisker Ware, a distinctive regional pottery style that originated in Cornwall and continued to be produced for almost a millennium.

==== Middle Bronze Age (c. 1500–1100 BCE) ====
The Middle Bronze Age was a period of major social and economic change. From c. 1500, an agricultural revolution occurred, farming expanded, and formal land boundaries were constructed. The landscape became 'domesticated', marking a fundamental difference between this period and the previous stage. The Middle Bronze Age was dominated by settlements rather than monuments; older ceremonial sites were abandoned, large mounds were no longer built, and ritual and burial activity shifted to sites within or near to settlements. There was a pronounced increase in settlement activity, and regionally distinctive sunken-floored roundhouses were constructed in the lowlands, while large numbers of stone huts were built in the uplands, particularly on Bodmin Moor, resulting in a relatively high settlement density by this time.

Trevisker Ware pottery is the only ceramic type found in Cornwall during the Middle Bronze Age, and the style spread to Devon, Dorset, and South Wales, and is even sometimes found as far away as Kent, Ireland, and France.

Widespread climatic deterioration is supposed to have taken place over the Middle Bronze Age period, perhaps contributing to an extensive abandonment of upland areas in south-west Britain.

Population migrations from Europe are thought to have introduced comparatively high levels of Early European Farmer ancestry into southern Britain over a 500-year period from c. 1300 to 800 BCE.

==== Late Bronze Age (c. 1100–800 BCE) ====
By the turn of the first millennium BCE, sunken-floored roundhouses were no longer being built, and were replaced by post-ring roundhouses similar to those found across southern Britain, which probably spread into Cornwall from Devon. Around the same time, Trevisker Ware ceramics were replaced by versions of the Late Bronze Age ('Post-Deverel-Rimbury') Plain Ware found throughout southern Britain at this time. The focus of activity shifted from upland to lowland zones, perhaps caused by a combination of environmental and socio-economic factors. Upland settlements on Bodmin Moor may have been abandoned after c. 1000 BCE, perhaps with continuing seasonal use connected with the movement of livestock herds to upland pastures in summer months.

Late Bronze Age metalwork provides evidence for increasing contact with the rest of Britain, as well as continuing links with communities along the Atlantic Façade. Large hoards of gold and bronze artefacts date from this period.

== Settlements ==
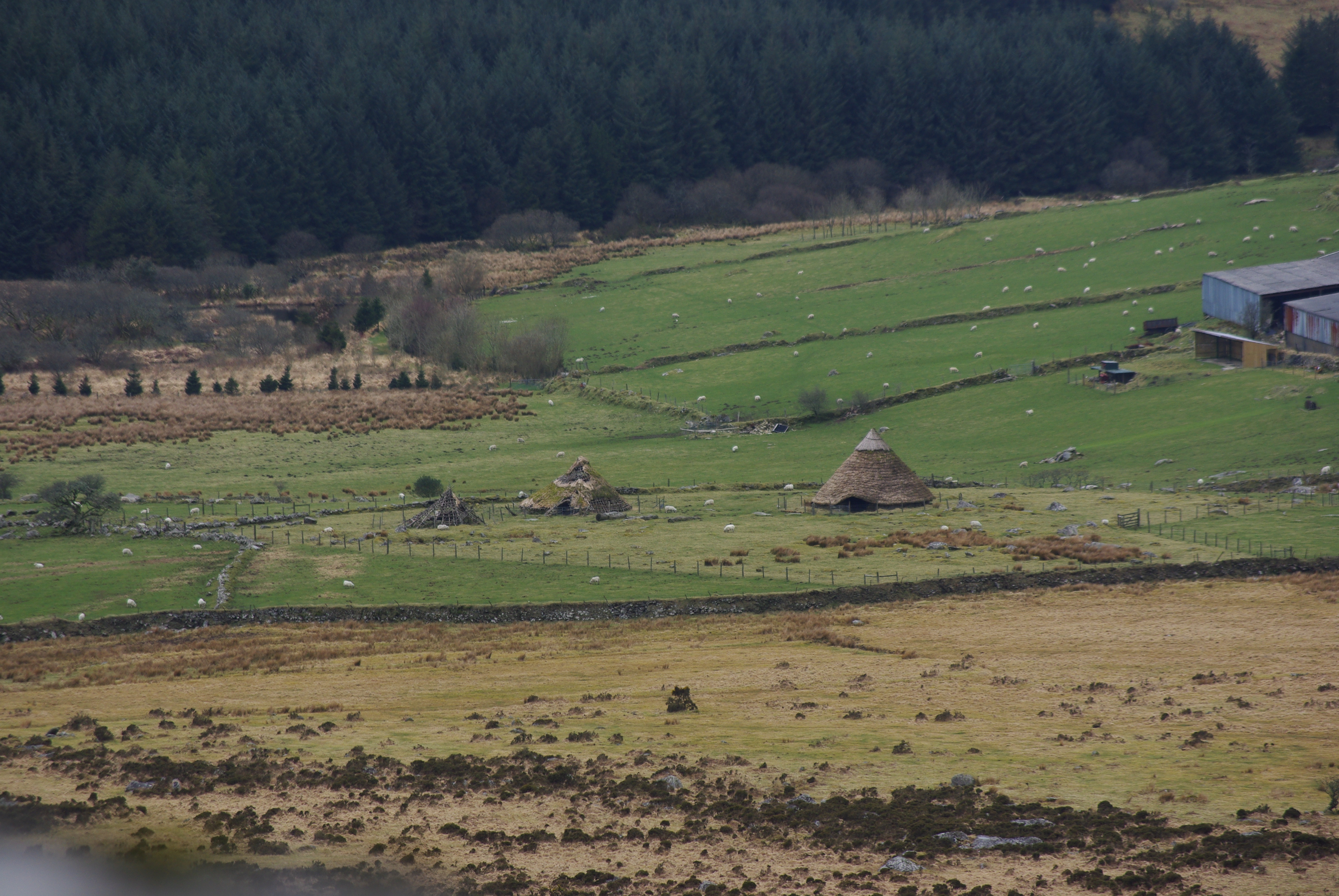
Reconstructed Bronze Age village at Trewortha Farm

The remains of Bronze Age settlements are found in upland, lowland, and coastal habitats, and are widely distributed across Cornwall; in West Penwith, on the north Cornish coast, on the Lizard peninsula, on Bodmin Moor, and on the Isles of Scilly. Settlements next to rivers are only rarely found, but it is likely that these have usually been later buried by sand and alluvium, making them more difficult to discover.

Settlement locations appear to have been chosen for reasons which included nearby resource availability and ensuring that important landmarks were visible from the settlement. Lowland settlements such as Trethellan and Trevisker were positioned to exploit coastal and woodland resources, as well as provide access to pastures in the nearby uplands. In upland areas such as Bodmin Moor and the West Penwith Moors, settlements were often located near cairns or prominent rocks. Most settlements in Scilly were built by the coast, with locations selected to provide shelter from prevailing winds, but with the most sheltered locations further inland being avoided, balancing protection from weather conditions with the ability to easily obtain food. A 2014 study using visibility analysis concluded that the Leskernick Hill settlement was "most likely the result of two separate decision-making processes, one to optimize the visibility of ritual monuments and important natural landmarks, and the other to optimize the visibility of nearby tin-extraction areas."

Settlement sizes vary considerably. Evidence from the Cornish lowlands suggests that settlements here were much smaller than in the uplands, typically comprising only one to three domestic structures. Trethellan, a small village of at least seven roundhouses, is the largest lowland settlement so far excavated. On the Bodmin Moor uplands, although some isolated huts are found, the overwhelming majority occur in settlements of very variable size, from 5 or 6 huts in small settlements such as Catshole Tor, to very large settlements such as Roughtor North, where there are over a hundred huts. The dense concentration of roundhouses at some upland sites may indicate that large communities inhabited the uplands, or alternatively that the same locality was being occupied by several generations of people over long periods of time.

Settlement activity during the Early Bronze Age seems to have been restricted to coastal areas and uplands. Direct evidence for settlement from this period is very rare, and consists of relatively insubstantial isolated buildings, such as the structures found at Sennen (c. 2400–2100 BCE), Gwithian (the so-called 'Beaker house', c. 1890–1610 BCE), and Tremough, Penryn (c. 1900–1600 BCE).

In the Middle Bronze Age the relatively temporary Early Bronze Age structures are superseded by more permanent roundhouse settlements, as with other parts of South-West Britain at this time. By c. 1500 BCE, the archaeological record indicates fairly dense settlement activity in both the upland and lowland zones. The period c. 1600–1200 BCE is thought to have been a period of milder climate, allowing upland areas to be more easily exploited compared with the preceding centuries. The pronounced increase in the number of inland and lowland settlements at this time may be connected with increasing alluvial tin exploitation. In general, most lowland settlements of this period were inhabited by families who lived as agriculturalists, raising livestock and growing crops, practising small-scale metalsmithing, and trading pottery and stone.

Evidence for Late Bronze Age settlement in Cornwall is much less common compared with the Middle Bronze Age. In the upland zones c. 1000 BCE, field patterns were modified, commons expanded, and permanent settlement appears to have ended. The standard explanation is that upland settlements were abandoned at this time, perhaps as a collective decision, due to climatic changes and soil degradation which may have been exacerbated by intensive agricultural practices and increased population density. Others have argued that this interpretation is not supported by environmental evidence, and that the development of more complex ownership patterns in the upland zone may be responsible for the observed changes in lifestyle. Rather than being completely abandoned, upland settlements may have been seasonally occupied, perhaps by cooperative groups whose primary homes were in the lowlands. The smaller artefact collection finds in the uplands also suggests that upland buildings were only used temporarily at specific times of the year, or were regularly abandoned for short periods.

There may have been links between upland and lowland settlements, with the lowlands permanently occupied, and upland settlements only being occupied seasonally, for long-term pastoral use. Cornish Bronze Age communities may have rotated their utilization of upland, lowland, and coastal zones. However, direct evidence for a connection between the inhabitants of lowland communities and upland settlements has not yet been found.

=== Bodmin Moor ===
Following a period of reduced human activity in the Late Neolithic, the Bronze Age is characterized by an upsurge in upland settlement. On Bodmin Moor, a 1994 survey detected 1,601 stone hut circles, 2,123 cairns, and 978 hectares (9.78 km^{2}) of enclosures and field systems, most of which probably date to the Bronze Age. A large number of probable Bronze Age settlements are found on valley slopes, as well as many more on exposed areas in the heart of the moor. Some settlements are densely concentrated, with many huts of similar size packed into a relatively small area, while others occupy a much larger area and are less densely settled, often consisting of a pattern of several small huts clustered around a single larger building. The Garrow and Roughtor area has the greatest settlement density, and also the most variation in hut morphology. This area, less than ten percent of the moor, has more than one-third of the total number of huts.

A variety of main settlement types are found on Bodmin Moor. These include unfortified open settlements, with houses closely grouped together, and settlements built on high exposed hills, with small irregular enclosures which may have been used as gardens. Both of these types of site may have been the summer residences of pastoralists.

Notable settlements include Leskernick Hill, dated c. 1690–1440 BCE and perhaps occupied until as late as 1000 BCE, one of the largest and best-preserved Middle Bronze Age sites on Bodmin Moor, with an area of around 21 hectares (0.21 km^{2}) comprising 51 stone roundhouses divided between two settlement areas; Stannon Down, near St Breward, an Early Bronze Age ceremonial complex which was in use from c. 2490–1120 BCE, with settlement activity from c. 1500 BCE, consisting of around 25 roundhouses; Blacktor, where ninety-six huts are concentrated in an area of only 3 hectares (0.030 km^{2}), with enclosures formed by joining huts together with short walling; Garrow Tor, a settlement with over 100 huts; and Brockabarrow Common, located on a ridge around 300 metres (980 ft) above sea level, which comprises 61 huts and 7 enclosures within an area of 4 hectares, a very complex settlement with a wide variety of hut forms and associated structures, implying long-term pastoral use.

=== Cornish Killas ===
Hollow-set, or 'sunken-floored' roundhouses are the predominant domestic structure in lowland settlements throughout the Cornish Middle Bronze Age. There are around twenty examples distributed across the lowlands of Cornwall. By the Late Bronze Age, structural evidence suggests that post-built roundhouses without hollow-set floors were being built in lowland settlements.

Notable settlements include Trevisker, near St Eval, c. 1700–1300 BCE, the eponymous site for the Trevisker Ware pottery commonly found in Cornwall throughout the Bronze Age, consisting of two or three Bronze Age roundhouses, with a mixed economy based on growing cereals and keeping livestock; Trethellan Farm, near the River Gannel in Newquay, c. 1500 to 1300 BCE, an exceptionally well-preserved Bronze Age agricultural settlement which comprised at least seven roundhouses, and may have had some features of a planned settlement; Gwithian, a coastal agricultural settlement near the Red River which had three main Bronze Age occupation phases starting from c. 1800 BCE with a single structure, followed c. 1500 BCE by a farmstead consisting of post-built structures and field systems, with a major settlement phase c. 1300 to 900 BCE, consisting of several buildings which included a possible granary and craft workshops; Scarcewater, near St Stephen-in-Brannel, between the Tresillian and Fal rivers, which had a Middle Bronze Age phase, c. 1500 to 1100 BCE, comprising three hollow-set roundhouses, one of which may have stood for 300 years, followed after a probable hiatus by a Late Bronze Age phase, c. 1100–900 BCE, consisting of a single post-built roundhouse; Carnon Gate, c. 1500–1300 BCE, which consisted of a single roundhouse on a hill slope on the Carnon valley, probably built less than 50 metres from the river; Tremough, near Penryn, c. 2000 – 1100 BCE, which comprised five post-ring roundhouses which are unlike other Cornish Bronze Age Cornish roundhouses, and may have been ceremonial monuments rather than standard domestic structures, as well as two more conventional hollow-set Middle Bronze Age roundhouses c. 1500–1300 BCE, one of which provides rare evidence for metalworking in a domestic roundhouse; Penhale Moor, a Middle Bronze Age settlement which consisted of an isolated roundhouse; and Nansloe, Helston, which comprised two Middle Bronze Age sunken-floored roundhouses, and a third possible Late Bronze Age roundhouse.

=== The Lizard ===
On Goonhilly Downs, a large plateau on the Lizard peninsula, the density of burial mounds suggests a high level of settlement during the second millennium BCE.

Both Gabbroic clay and finished pots were probably transported by boat from here to other parts of Cornwall, perhaps by groups who were regularly visiting the Lizard to obtain clay and manufacturing pottery from it at their own settlements, in exchange for other commodities.

Settlements near the coast include Kynance Gate, just north of Lizard Point, a 3-acre site built on a plateau of serpentine on the north side of a valley 600 yards from the sea around 215 feet (66 m) above sea level, comprising a group of stone-walled roundhouses enclosed with an 80 feet (24 m) diameter wall constructed around a natural cairn, and another group of unenclosed stone-walled roundhouses to the north; and Poldowrian, near Mullion, consisting of a single roundhouse built 100 metres from the current cliff edge, 500 feet (150 m) above sea level, in an area built on serpentine but very close to the gabbro bedrock. Further inland, settlements include Boden Vean, in St Anthony-in-Meneage, Lizard, 70 metres above sea level, comprising a single Middle Bronze Age sunken-floored roundhouse; and Trelan, Lizard, a late Neolithic to Early Bronze Age site apparently constructed between c. 2600 and 1500 BCE.

=== West Penwith ===
Most of the West Penwith Bronze Age settlements that have been excavated were built upon higher ground. Settlements in the more fertile lowland valleys are likely to have existed, but probably are not visible above ground and are therefore more difficult to identify. Evidence of possible processing and consumption of food at St Buryan may indicate settlement activity.

There may have been links between upland and lowland Penwith settlements, with lowland settlements permanently occupied, and upland settlements only occupied seasonally. The West Penwith Moors are of a relatively lower elevation, and so it is likely that they were more frequently occupied than other, higher upland areas like Bodmin Moor.

In West Penwith, roundhouses are distributed in small numbers, within rectilinear or irregular field systems. Systematic field layouts are limited to a few hundred metres here, in contrast to the much more extensive Dartmoor reave systems. Faced stone walls filled with rubble core and a rab (gravel) floor are regularly found here, in common with other upland areas in Cornwall.

Settlements include Sperris Croft, consisting of seven roundhouses aligned in a row at the top of a ridge; Wicca Round, a settlement 150 metres north of Sperris Croft comprising 3 ruined huts within field systems; and Bosiliack, in Madron parish, one of the largest Bronze Age roundhouse settlements in West Penwith, located on the side of a shallow valley 350 metres to the north-west of the Bosiliack entrance grave and around 180 metres above sea level, consisting of at least 13 stone-walled roundhouses in an approximately 70 by 40 metre (0.28 hectares) area.

=== Scilly ===
Permanent and substantial human settlement of Scilly is thought to have begun c. 2000 BCE. It has been argued that the first settlers may have come from West Penwith, based on the similar entrance graves there. There are the remains of around 150 stone huts in Scilly, many of which probably date to the Bronze Age, as well as Bronze Age field systems, cairn cemeteries, and numerous entrance graves. Houses are found in groups of two or three, often joined, close to field systems, and close to cairns.

Scilly features numerous settlement sites, ranging in size from individual stone roundhouses at Samson Flats, West Broad Ledge, and Little Bay, to small villages. Some of the larger excavated settlements include Nornour, south-east of St Martin's, which was occupied from c. 1500 BCE to c. 500 BCE and appears to have had limited contact with the mainland throughout this period, comprising two stone huts and a third additional building; Porth Killier, St Agnes, a Bronze Age fishing and farming community comprising around three roundhouses; and Dolphin Town, located at the base of a hill near the east coast of Tresco, a few metres above sea level, where a wide range of pottery, three Middle Bronze Age roundhouses, and an early field system is found.

== Structures ==
=== Buildings ===
Domestic structures from the Early Bronze Age period are rare. They include the irregular oval-shaped, fairly flimsy, and probably short-lived Beaker-associated structure at Sennen, c. 2400 to 2100 BCE, which is the earliest Bronze Age structure known in Cornwall and may have been used for grain preparation, consisting of at least 8 post holes which may have supported a superstructure, probably enclosed by a fence; the 'Beaker house' at Gwithian (c. 1890 to 1610 BCE), a homestead associated with early agriculture and Beaker pottery, built on a terrace within a stake-built wooden enclosure with a porched entrance and deep gullies along the front; and a small, insubstantial, and relatively temporary structure at Tremough, Penryn (c. 1900 to 1600 BCE), which was apparently the short-term home of a metallurgist.

In the Middle Bronze Age, two main types of roundhouses are found. The first type, hollow-set (or 'sunken-floored') roundhouses, are part of a regional architectural tradition found in the lowlands of Cornwall, where there are around twenty known examples. Radiocarbon dates from lowland sites show that hollow-set roundhouse building was mainly restricted to the period c. 1500 to 1000 BCE. Hollow-set roundhouses ranged from around 8 to 15 metres (26 to 49 ft) in diameter, and were built within a circular or oval stone-lined hollow cut into the ground. The internal face was lined with a low wattle and daub, sod, or local sedimentary rock wall surrounding a wooden (perhaps oak) load-bearing post-ring, which carried the weight of the conical roofs, perhaps constructed with rafters made from ash, which probably used rushes or straw as weatherproof thatching materials. Doorways were usually in the south or south-east, providing warmth, light, and protection from the prevailing winds. Not all hollow-set roundhouses were domestic structures. The roundhouse from Callestick, for example, is constructed differently and appears to have served a ritual function. The second type of roundhouse, mainly circular or oval stone-walled huts, predominated on upland settlements such as Bodmin Moor. Double or single-faced walls, probably around 3.5 feet (1.1 m) high and constructed from granite are typical, but there is considerable variation in the wall structure of this type of building. Dry stone walling may have been used as an alternative method of construction, used when massive slabs of granite were no longer easily obtainable. Floors were made from clay, with entrance passages and the area inside the entrance of the hut paved with stone. Roofs were conical, resting on the walls and supported by a central post-hole. Wattle or thatch was probably used as roofing material. Like lowland roundhouses, these buildings usually have a single, south facing entrance, sometimes with a porch. Some huts, such as those at Stannon, had fairly sophisticated stone-capped internal drainage systems, probably to remove the large volumes of water that would have accumulated in the walls of the hut after heavy rain. Timber structures may have been used to partition space within the house, and shelves may have been built around the walls. Non-structural post-holes suggest that some huts may have contained furniture such as dressers or beds. Huts vary widely in their dimensions, from less than 4 metres to more than 8 metres in diameter, with buildings having a surface area of up to 120 square metres (1,300 ft^{2}). Most buildings of this type fall within a range of 5–7 metres diameter, large enough for 4 or 5 people. Smaller huts may have only been used seasonally, perhaps for storage, or as livestock shelters or workshops. Walls often link huts together in a linear arrangement, and most are associated with field boundaries and enclosures. The wide variations of size, internal diameter, and wall construction method seen in these buildings may represent different functions, household size, or status of the inhabitants. Roundhouses of this second type are widely distributed across the Cornish uplands.

In Scilly, buildings are constructed from granite blocks, with 1–2.5 metre thick walls, double-faced with rubble or earth cores. Houses are typically built into terraced slopes, natural hollows, or middens, providing insulation against the wind and support for load-bearing walls. Houses are predominantly round, with a minority of oval buildings. The majority of second millennium BCE buildings are between 3.3 and 5.6 metres diameter.

Other buildings are also found which are less typical. For instance, the roundhouse at Carnon Gate is stone-walled, like those of upland settlements, but hollow-set like other lowland roundhouses. Another unusual structure is found at Poldowrian, Lizard, where a Bronze Age roundhouse with an internal wooden post-ring, an entrance porch, and a cobbled pathway, has stone walls made of local serpentine. The circular post-ring roundhouses at Tremough, Penryn, are also not like other Bronze Age Cornish roundhouses, and more closely resemble the domestic structures that are found during this period in southern Britain as far west as east Devon.

=== Field systems ===
Extensive prehistoric field systems were constructed in Cornwall from around the middle of the second millennium BCE and established by the end of the Middle Bronze Age, mainly concentrated in the west of Cornwall. In some parts of West Cornwall, enclosed field boundaries seem to have been constructed at a relatively early date. At Gwithian for instance, field boundaries may have been continually used from 1800 BCE to 800 BCE. Most of these boundary systems are significantly different from those of central southern and south-east Britain, and include "a bewildering array of freeform styles, unhindered by predetermined conventions of linearity or accepted orientation".

As well as these diverse ad hoc boundary systems, the coaxial and rectilinear systems found east of Cornwall are found sporadically. Cornish coaxial field systems are thought to be a fragmentary regional variant of the Dartmoor reave systems. They consist of granite-walled adjacent field boundaries forming a series of long parallel lines. They are primarily found in the uplands but also occur in coastal areas. Coaxial field systems are found in West Penwith, at Pennance, Wicca, and Chysauster; in the area inland from Mounts Bay at Godolphin; Lizard, on the gabbro rock at Kestlemerris and Polcoverack; on Bodmin Moor, at Roughtor, Carne Downs, Watergate, Smallacombe, Hamatethy, and notably East Moor; and near the Tamar, at Kit Hill. According to Peter Herring, coaxial field systems were probably not only used for agriculture, but were also regarded as monuments due to the amount of work required to construct them and their impact on the landscape. Coaxial field systems continued to respect Neolithic monuments such as cairns and stone rows, which were often incorporated into their construction.

In West Cornwall, c. 1000 BCE, field systems were changed, and coaxial systems were replaced with much more densely spaced rectangular enclosures (the so-called 'Celtic fields') which were probably used to cultivate crops, unlike the coaxial fields.

There is little evidence for enclosed fields in the lowland areas, but since there is evidence that lowland settlements practised livestock farming, it is likely that they built field boundaries that have not been detected, perhaps because they were constructed from sedimentary rock or wood rather than granite, or because they were not ditched like upland field systems.

=== Tor enclosures ===
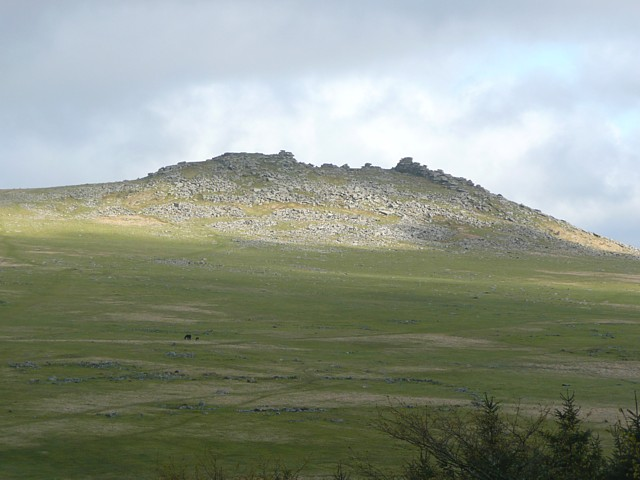
Roughtor

Natural rocky outcrops such as tors were artificially enhanced by stacking up more rock around them, creating semi-artificial hillforts ('tor enclosures') that could be controlled and cultivated, with their use restricted, perhaps by local elite individuals. Examples include Roughtor, around 400 metres (1,300 ft) above sea level, and Stowe's Pound, an enclosure built at the top of Stowe's Hill, which is 381 metres (1,250 ft) above sea level. The Roughtor and Stowe's Pound tor enclosures, both on Bodmin Moor, were probably originally constructed during the Neolithic, but they were heavily structurally modified during the Bronze Age. Substantial settlement occurred around tor enclosures, and they may also have functioned as centres of communal ritual practices.

=== Monuments ===
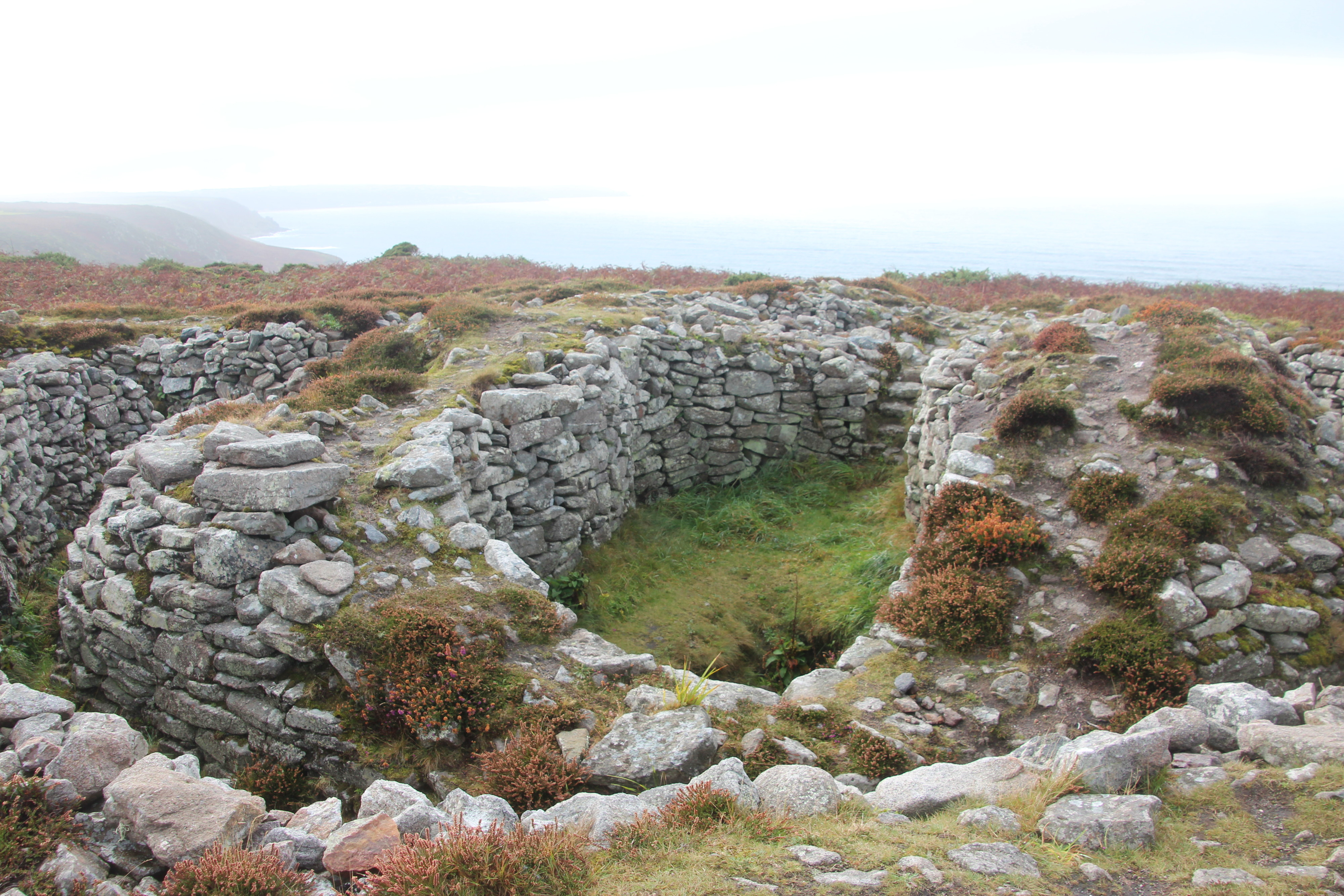
Ballowall Barrow

The first half of the second millennium BCE has been described as a period of monument construction unparalleled since the earlier Neolithic. Thousands of barrows and cairns were constructed in Cornwall during this period, along with numerous stone circles, stone rows, and other monumental structures.

Prominent rocks were likely to have been culturally and spiritually significant to the inhabitants of upland areas such as Bodmin Moor and Penwith, and natural features such as hills, rivers, and especially rocky outcrops were particularly important places for deciding the location or alignment of ceremonial monuments, as were existing Neolithic structures and focal points. Many new monuments were constructed near to, in alignment with, within sight of, or on top of previously significant features. Large cairns are almost always found in prominent places, along ridges or beside older monuments. Numerous monuments on Bodmin Moor, such as many of the barrows at Stannon Down, are concentrated in the vicinity of or aligned with Roughtor, a prominent peak with a distinctive shape. The Leskernick Hill ritual landscape was probably planned in relation to previously existing Neolithic structures and alignments. In Penwith, The Pipers, The Merry Maidens, and several other monuments may have been built with respect to the previously built Late Neolithic cromlech and the later stone circle and cairns at Boscawen-Un.

At the lowland settlements during the Middle Bronze Age, new types of specialized structures and purpose-built roundhouses, separate from the main settlement, were sometimes used for rituals. Andy Jones states that Middle Bronze Age communities in Cornwall were "choosing to create formal ceremonial areas and buildings on the margins of settlements", with a variety of forms that included square and circular shapes, with or without roofs. At Callestick, a circular building with a porch, near a probable settlement, may have been one such ceremonial monument. A Middle Bronze Age circular structure at Harlyn has been interpreted as a possible shrine. And at Trethellan, a small, 10.24 square metres (110.2 ft^{2}) square-floored stone building, which had been completely infilled with quartz blocks, seems to have been designed for interior darkness, appears to have only rarely been entered, and has evidence of grain deposits, all of which perhaps indicates a ritual function.

Early to Middle Bronze Age freestanding timber post-hole monuments may be contemporaneous with roundhouse building, perhaps with some sort of symbolic relationship between the two types of structure. Such structures are found at Stannon, where timber settings have been found within a ring cairn; Belowda, where two timber post-rings are found; and Tremough, where an alignment of 5 timber post rings, in use through much of the second millennium BCE, is found. The structures at Tremough and Stannon were probably built near to their contemporaneous settlements.

==== Barrows and cairns ====
Barrow building appears to have begun in Cornwall c. 2100 BCE, combining existing Neolithic traditions with a new ideology of monument building related to the enclosure of circular structures. A wide range of types are found, including bowl barrows, bell barrows, disc barrows, ring cairns, and tailed cairns. Barrows and cairns had a diverse range of uses, many of which were unrelated to burials. Some round barrows may have also been aligned with various celestial events.

Barrows are commonly found in groups ('barrow cemeteries') including those of Davidstow Moor, St. Breock Downs, Botrea, and Cataclews. They usually occupy distinctive parts of the landscape such as plateaus or high elevations, but are often sited in locations that were not particularly conspicuous, perhaps implying an intention to contain the cemetery within a restricted space.

==== Megaliths ====
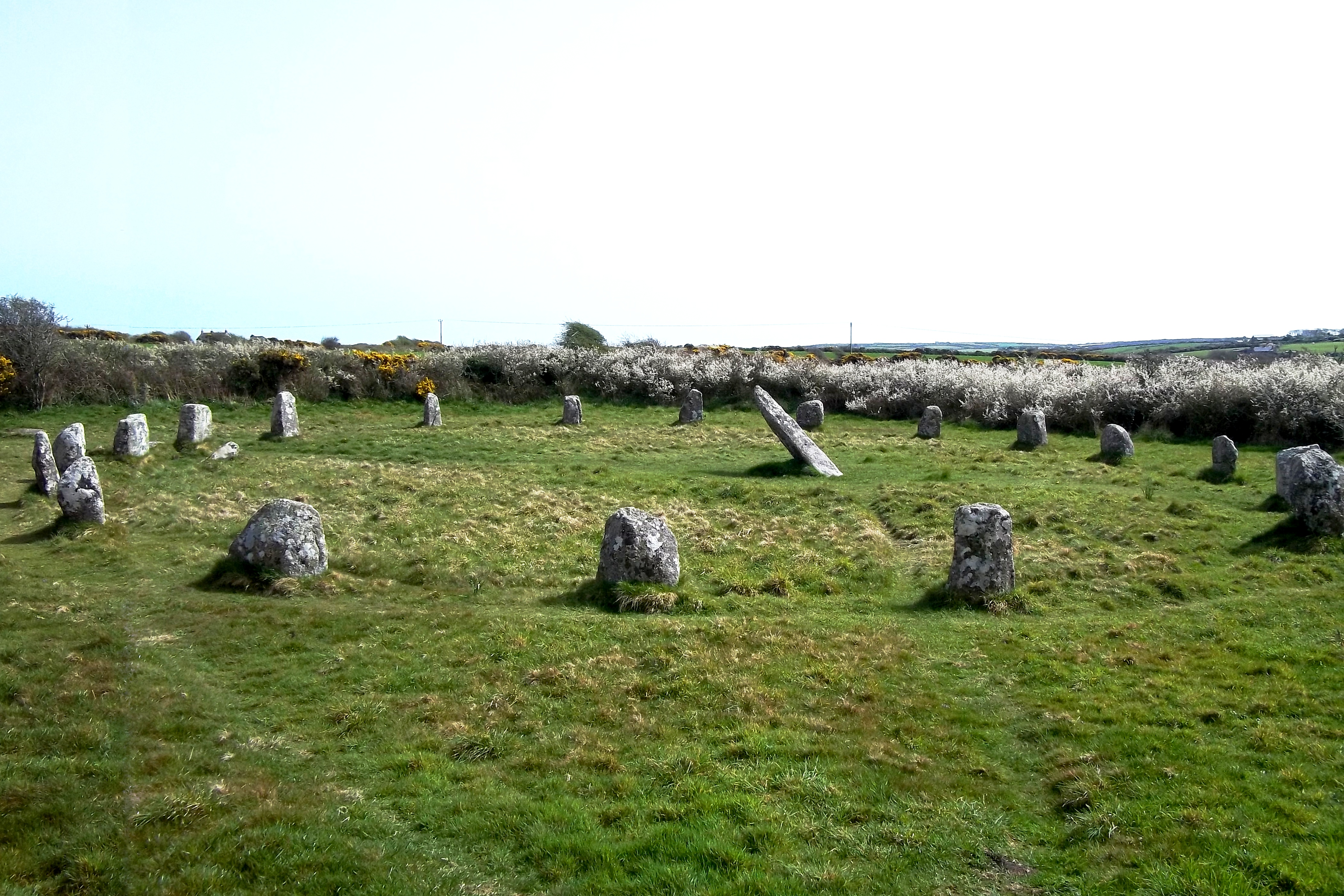
Boscawen-Un stone circle

A large number of megaliths, such as menhirs, stone circles, and stone rows, were raised in the Bronze Age. Menhirs probably functioned as memorial gravestones, and stone circles and stone rows functioned as the main ceremonial and processional sites, respectively. The tallest known menhir in Cornwall, now destroyed, was Maen Pearn at Constantine, which was 7.4 metres tall. Other menhirs which are still standing include two monuments both called the Pipers at St Buryan and Minions, the Blind Fiddler, the Old Man of Gugh in Scilly, the Tremenheere Longstone on the Lizard, and the Try, Gulval menhir.

There are more than twenty stone circles in Cornwall, probably constructed in the early Bronze Age, mainly on Bodmin Moor and West Penwith. Many Cornish stone circles are smaller than those found in other regions. With the exception of the Duloe stone circle, which is made from quartzite, they are all made of granite, and may have been used for religious rituals. Stone circles appear to have been constructed in specific locations so that tors could be seen from them. They may have been constructed to mark the rising and setting of the sun in relation to features visible on the horizon from inside the circle. For example, Brown Willy is thought to mark sunrise and sunset at the equinox from six nearby stone circles, and on May Day, the sun rises through a cleft on Roughtor and shines into the Stannon stone circle. At the Goodaver stone circle, located on top of a ridge where there are no nearby tors, the large number of solar alignments may suggest that it served some sort of calendar function. In folklore, these stones are often depicted as humans turned to stone as punishment for breaking the sabbath, dancing, or hurling. Notable stone circles include the Merry Maidens at Boleigh and the Hurlers, a group of three stone circles on Bodmin Moor.

There are eight stone rows in Cornwall. With the exception of Nine Maidens near St. Columb, they are all on Bodmin Moor. These include Carneglos, Buttern Hill, Craddock Moor, and Leskernick. The functions of stone rows may have been to connect less noticeable parts of the landscape, as well as marking the centres or boundaries of sacred areas.

==== Entrance graves ====
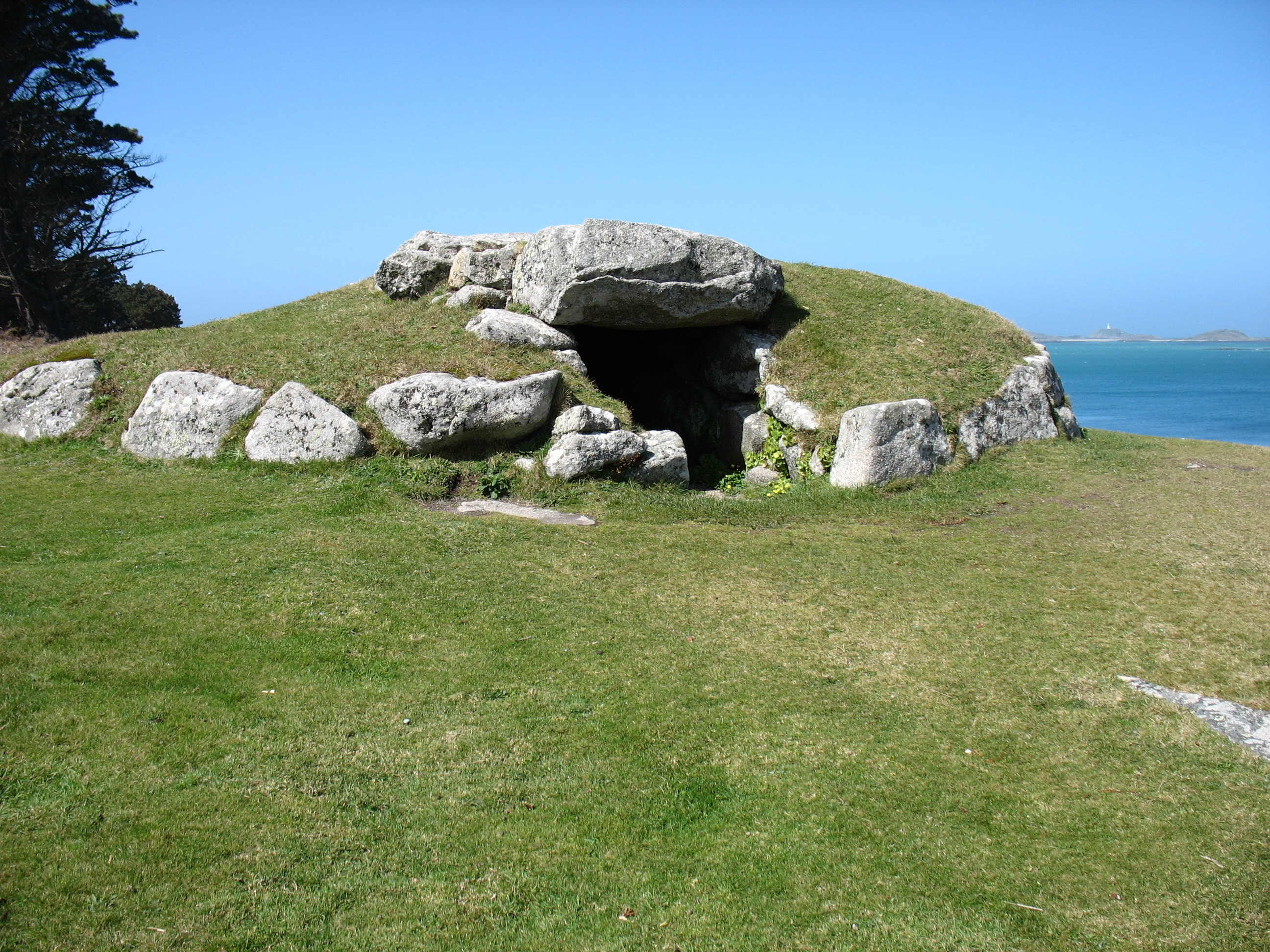
Innisidgen Carn, Upper Chamber, Scilly

In the far south-west, there is evidence of distinctive burial customs that exhibit local characteristics and Atlantic influence. A type of chambered tombs, called entrance graves, are dated to the Early Bronze Age, c. 2000–1500 BCE, and restricted to the western edge of Cornwall, mainly in Scilly, with around a dozen examples in West Penwith. Cornish entrance graves are part of an Early Bronze Age monument building tradition along the Atlantic Façade, where there are similar monuments in County Waterford, south-east Ireland (the Tramore tombs), and south-west Scotland (the Bargrennan cairns). Small numbers of somewhat comparable monuments are also found in the Channel Islands and Brittany. Andy Jones speculates that communities in western Cornwall may have intended to demonstrate their connections to other communities which shared a distinct 'Atlantic identity' on the Atlantic façade by borrowing from their burial traditions and integrating them with local practices. It is not yet certain whether entrance graves were first constructed in Penwith or Scilly.

There are around 13 entrance graves in West Penwith, including Bosiliack, Ballowall, Gulval, Tregeseal, and Tregiffian. Mainland entrance graves are small circular kerb-lined mounds or cairns, with an undifferentiated short passage and internal chamber, and capped with large flat granite slabs. Sizes vary considerably, from 16 metres diameter at Tolcreeg, to only 5 metres diameter at Bosiliack. Human remains are usually deposited, generally in the form of interments of the cremated disarticulated bones of multiple individuals. There are chambers similar to those of the Penwith entrance graves incorporated into much larger and more complex structures at Ballowall and Chapel Carn Brea.

Entrance graves are much more numerous in Scilly than in Penwith, with at least eighty and perhaps almost a hundred examples. These include the group at Porth Hellick, Bant's Carn, Obadiah's Barrow, and Knackyboy Carn. There are several differences between the Scillonian entrance graves and the examples on the mainland. Entrance graves in Scilly are often found in groups, whereas in Penwith all except the two at Treen occur individually. Scillonian entrance grave chambers are sometimes described as 'boat-shaped', compared to the rectangular or wedge-shaped chambers in Penwith. And unlike in Penwith, the location of entrance graves in Scilly is consistently associated with rocky outcrops, and many of the structures incorporate earth-set boulders into their structures.

==== Ceremonial complexes ====
Diverse complexes of funerary and non-funerary monuments are found throughout Cornwall. One of the most thoroughly studied and excavated of these ceremonial complexes is the site of Stannon Down, in the south-west of Bodmin Moor. Stannon consists of five monument groups, including a wide variety of monument forms that were probably associated with a wide range of ritual practices. The Stannon complex includes a total of 17 or 18 ring cairns, tailed cairns, and more complicated forms, and one or two stone-lined cists which may have been used for inhumation burials. The Stannon stone circle lies 800 metres to the south. The complex was probably in use for more than a millennium from c. 2500 BCE to c. 1100 BCE, with settlement activity beginning after c. 1500 BCE. In general there is very little evidence for burial or funerary activity here. Based on organic remains, it is possible that ceremonial feasting took place within the ceremonial complex. Andy Jones suggests that the cairns formed "a coherent group of monuments which were part of a wider landscape cosmology which involved the grouping of particular monument types and the referencing of prominent rocks and tors."

== Subsistence ==
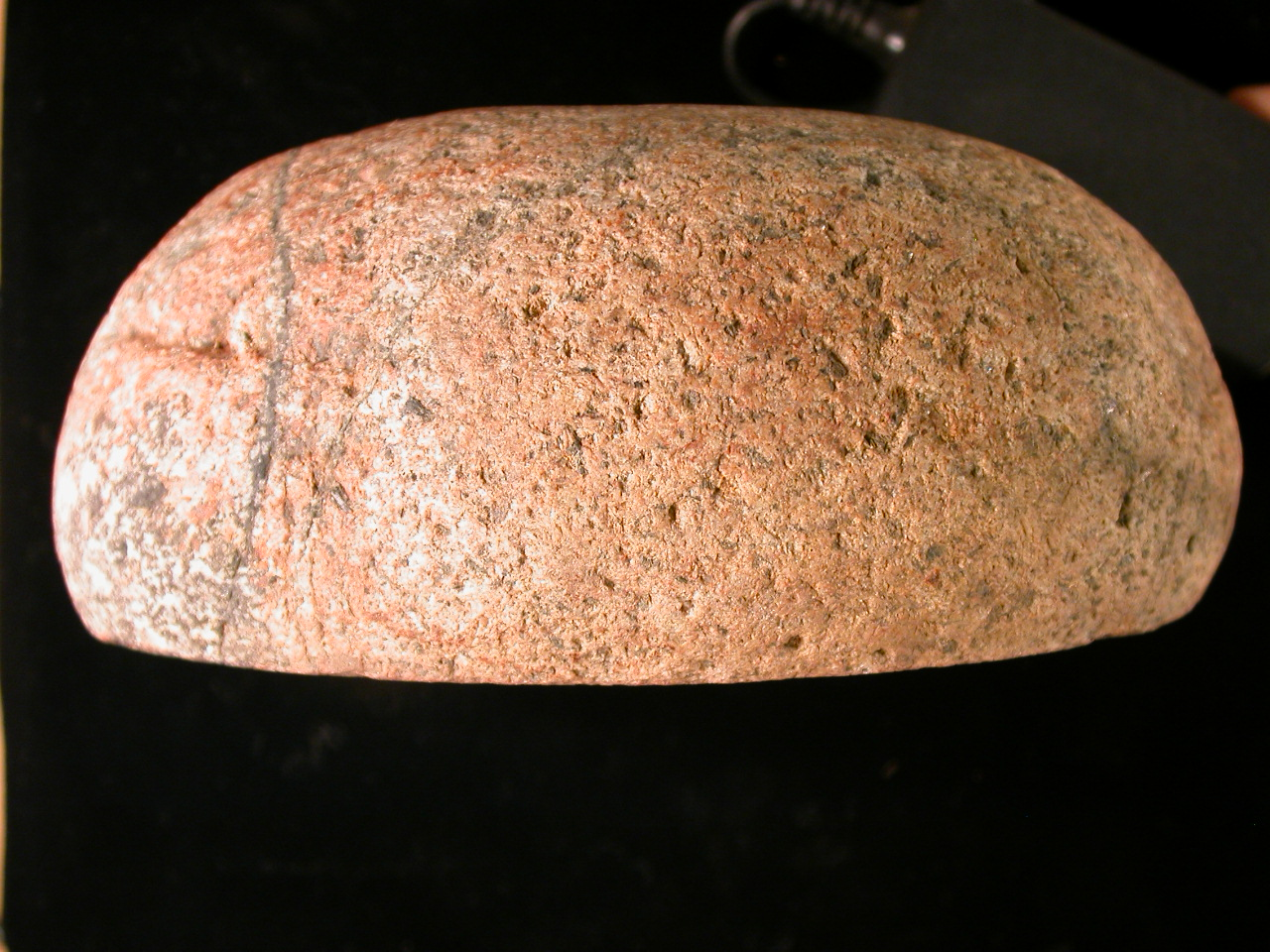
Bronze Age muller, Gwinear

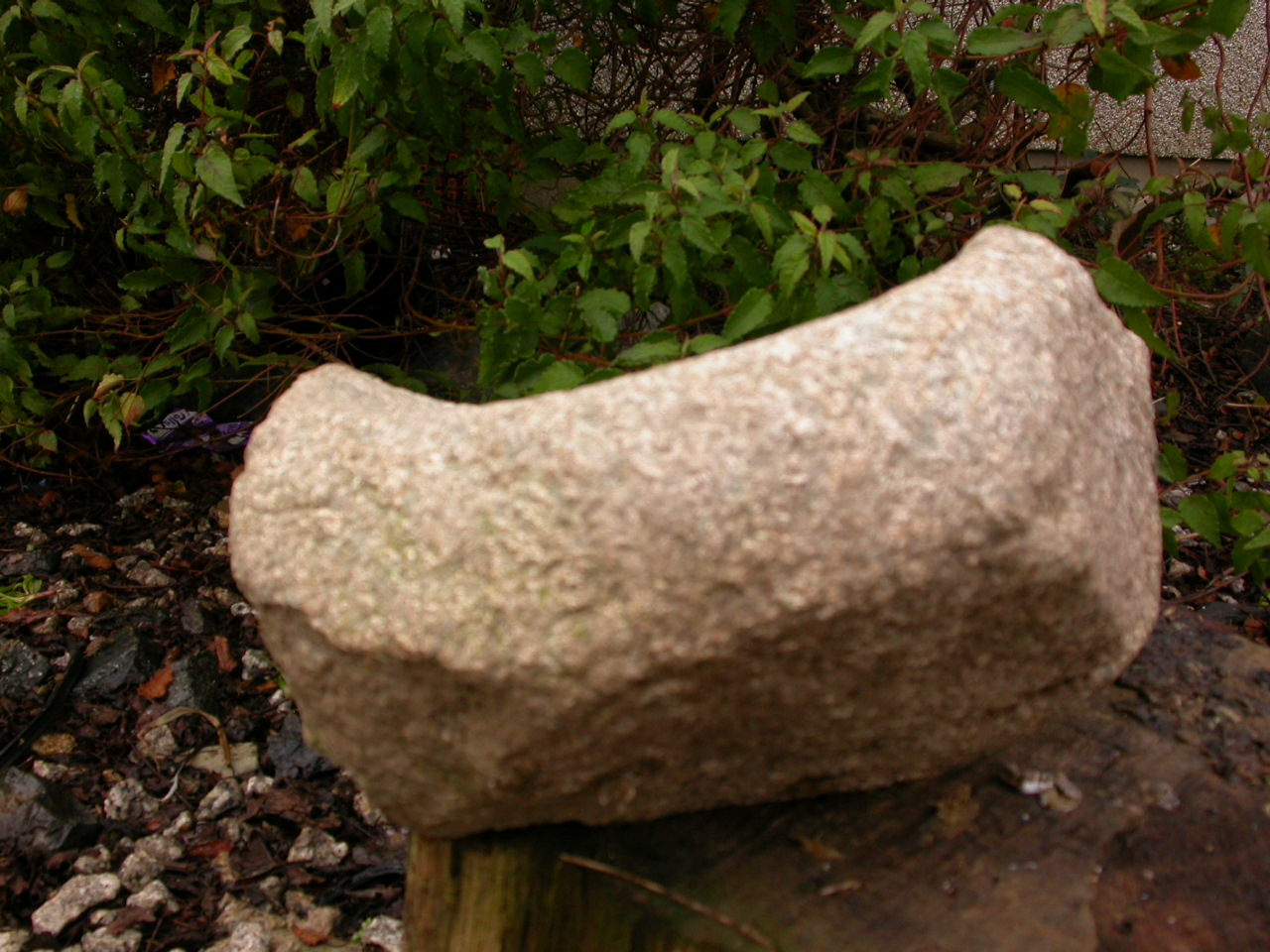
Bronze Age saddle quern, Trethellan

From 1500 BCE, by which time the majority of the population of Cornwall probably belonged to farming communities, there was significant expansion of agricultural land. In general, animal husbandry predominated, with arable farming mainly restricted to coastal areas where the soil was more suitable for growing crops.

Although pollen core evidence suggests the possibility that limited cereal cultivation took place at Stannon Down, the morphology of the field systems at sites at East Moor and Roughtor, as well as ecological and palynological evidence, indicates that the economy of Bodmin Moor was overwhelmingly pastoral. In contrast, lowland and coastal settlements such as Gwithian and Trethellan were mixed arable and livestock farming societies, supplemented by activities such as hunting, fishing, or gathering wild foods.

Evidence for Bronze Age animal husbandry is found at sites such as Gwithian where, in addition to arable and pasture farming, woods and scrub were utilized to provide forage and cover for pigs and red deer. Domesticated and semi-domesticated animal bone finds at Trethellan and Gwithian include domestic cattle, ovicaprids, pig, and roe and red deer. Evidence for transhumance is found at upland sites by the Middle Bronze Age. During the summer months, livestock were probably moved to upland areas to utilize rough grazing land and remove them from the crop and hay fields in lowland settlements. People from the lowlands may have accompanied their livestock to the uplands, protecting them and processing their milk while living in seasonally occupied unenclosed settlements.

Crops that were cultivated included wheat, barley, Celtic beans, and occasionally oats. Different sites have yielded various assemblages of evidence for arable crops. At the Trethellan site crops included wheat, Celtic beans, and flax, which were sown in the spring. Emmer, spelt, and bread wheat were probably sown here in the autumn. A structure at Trethellan has been identified as a possible open-air oven, perhaps indicating that bread was baked here. At Tremough, wheat, barley, Celtic beans, and oats were some of the crops identified. Barley was the main crop at both the Trethellan and Tremough settlements. At Trevilson, charred plant remains provide evidence for the cultivation of wheat, barley, garden pea, and perhaps oats. Additionally a large cache of Celtic bean is found here. At Porth Killier, Scilly, barley, emmer wheat and Celtic bean were among the crops identified. A cache of naked barley dated c. 2198–1772 BCE is also found in Scilly at East Porth, Samson, which is the earliest direct evidence for arable farming in Scilly. At Gwithian, soil may have been enhanced by addition of compost and manure, and there is also rare evidence for the use of spades and ard ploughs.

Coastal and riverine communities supplemented their diet with marine foods. At Gwithian the settlement is near a river and close to the sea, which would have provided a source of fish, evidenced by fish bone finds and a single whale bone. Pebble tools, including line winders and net sinkers, suggest that both offshore and deep sea fishing took place here. Diet at Trethellan was probably supplemented by gathering molluscs such as mussels and limpets. In Scilly, subsistence was mainly based on fishing, collecting shellfish, and hunting sea mammals. At Porth Killier for instance, the inhabitants had a mainly marine-based diet consisting of seabirds, fish, seals, and shellfish, and several limpet middens are found.

Diet was further augmented by foraging for wild foods including hazelnut, sloe, and crab apple. Wild foods at Trethellan included cleavers, nettles, sheep's sorrel, wild radish, chickweed, and mallow in spring, and sloe, rosehip, hawthorn berries, and hazelnuts in the autumn. At Tremough, hedgerow plants such as hazelnuts, hawthorn berries, blackberries, and elderberries may have been collected as food.

Analysis of the residue of a cup at Treligga indicate that it may have been used to consume mead or some similar substance. Analysis of residues from pottery sherds at Trethellan show that ruminant dairy products were made here. Lipid analysis on the ceramics found that 36% of the sherds analysed contained cow, sheep, or goat fats.

== Ritual ==
=== Funerals ===
There is a strong preference for cremation funerals in the Beaker period and Early Bronze Age, and inhumation burials are rare in Cornwall throughout the Bronze Age. Both inhumation and cremation burials have been occasionally found in the vicinity of Middle Bronze Age roundhouse settlements, and an inhumation and a cremation occur together at two sites, Lousey and Polhendra.

Beaker-associated cremations are relatively rare in Britain as a whole, but in Cornwall they are predominant, perhaps suggesting a different ideology towards the dead. In Cornwall, the only definite Beaker-associated inhumation is at Lousey Barrow, St. Juliot, though there was also a cremation burial even here. Cremation vessels may contain the remains of a single individual, such as the cremation from the entrance grave at Bosiliack, or multiple persons, such as the cist at Trelowthas barrow which contained the remains of several people, and the Early Bronze Age cremation at Harlyn, which probably represents the remains of up to five children. As well as cremation deposits that may represent the complete remains of a single person, a number of sites feature token or partial cremation burials, such as Treligga, Davidstow, and Chysauster, where cremation remains were only a fraction of what would be expected for a complete individual.

Examples of inhumation burials are found at Harlyn Bay, where an Early Bronze Age cist contained the skeleton of a young female accompanied by a large quartz-rich stone, and Constantine Island, where an inhumation burial within a cist contained a crouched male radiocarbon dated to the Middle Bronze Age. There is also a single example of a multiple inhumation burial from the Watch Hill site. It has been suggested that funerary rituals did not necessarily require burial of the dead, perhaps providing a plausible explanation for why the proportion of inhumation burials in barrows is so low.

=== Grave goods ===
Ceramics, mainly Trevisker Ware, are the most common artefact deposition in barrows. Metal is much less common, and only six barrows contain gold. Barrows are frequently associated with small-scale depositions, often stone and especially quartz, which was probably thought to have symbolic properties, and was ritually deposited in various contexts during the second millennium BCE. Stone depositions in burial contexts include a small pile of beach pebbles from the inhumation burial at Gwithian, a heart-shaped pebble from one of the cremations at Boscregan, two jasper pebbles mixed with a cremation at Bosporthenis, and flint, pebbles and a large quartz crystal in the grave at Caerloggas. Metal depositions include bronze daggers, which are sometimes deposited in barrows after c. 1750. A bronze axe was found in the cist at Harlyn, which is an unusual find in burials. Rillaton Barrow, dated to the early second millennium BCE and the richest of the Cornish barrows, contained the famous Rillaton gold cup, and now lost items including a dagger, a rivet, bone or ivory, and (possibly faience) beads. This barrow may be associated with some elite individual from the Stowe's Pound tor enclosure. With the exception of the Rillaton barrow, artefact finds indicative of high-status are rarely found together with individual human remains. Multiple-person cremation deposits, in contrast, were regularly associated with artefacts. Andy Jones suggests that this differential treatment might be intended to emphasize a 'community of ancestors' while simultaneously attaching less importance to individuality.

=== Ritual abandonment and destruction ===
Roundhouses were associated with a variety of ritual practices, such as placing offerings in pits and postholes during the building stage, the ritualized destruction of buildings with fire, and the building of mounds over demolished buildings. At Penhale Moor, a roundhouse was symbolically 'killed' by thrusting a spear into the floor, which was followed by controlled destruction by fire and the infilling of the roundhouse interior. At Trethellan Farm, buildings were symbolically buried at the end of their 'lives', and were dismantled, levelled, and covered with earth and rubble. At Gwithian, some buildings were deliberately destroyed, and the ruins were covered with rubbish consisting of bones and other objects. Widespread ritualized demolition and abandonment of sunken-floored roundhouse settlements seems to have occurred at sites such as Trethellan, Tremough, and Nansloe Farm. The reasons for this practice are unknown. Perhaps the death of a prominent member of the community may have been interpreted as a signal that the lifetime of the settlement had come to an end.

Other objects were apparently also liable to ritualized destruction. In the Late Bronze Age, socketed axe heads were deliberately destroyed and deposited, either individually or in hoards. Querns may have been used symbolically in the final closure of structures. At Trethellan Farm, a quern was apparently ritually smashed and burned. Joanna Brück suggests that in this case the death of a house was "accompanied by the death of one of the objects central to the household's material and social reproduction. Like its user, it was burnt, broken and buried at the end of its life."

== Metal exploitation ==
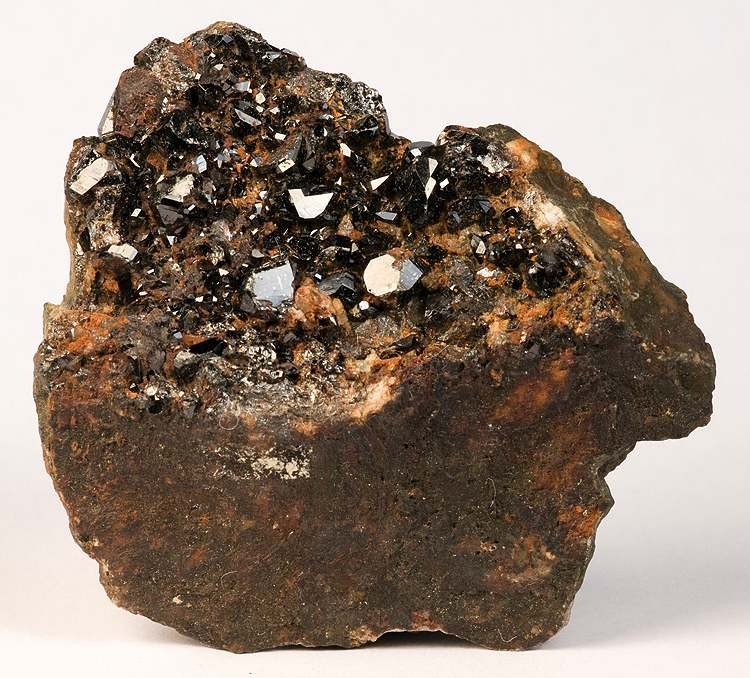
Cassiterite (tin ore) from St. Just

It is widely believed that Cornish alluvial deposits containing cassiterite and native gold were exploited during the Bronze Age. Alluvial gold may have been extracted from Cornish streams from c. 2000 BCE, or possibly even earlier, in the chalcolithic, and was perhaps the main source of the gold used in the British and Irish Early Bronze Age. Tin extraction probably began in Cornwall in the early Bronze Age, and perhaps as early as c. 2300 BCE. There is some limited direct evidence for tin production and extraction. Recent excavations have found large quantities of cassiterite (tin ore) pebbles in two Early Bronze Age pits, and traces of tin have been found on a Beaker era artefact. At Trevisker, cassiterite pebbles and evidence of bronze-working were found in a building, and at Caerloggas, St Austell, the barrow yielded seven fragments of tin slag associated with a dagger. A cassiterite pebble is found at an Early Bronze Age site at Tremough, and over 100 cassiterite pebbles have been found together with Trevisker Ware pottery at an Early to Middle Bronze Age site at Tregurra valley, Truro. A variety of tool finds including antler picks and wooden shovels indicate mining activity. Hammerstones, perhaps used to mine ore, are found at several sites including Gwithian and Trethellan. It is possible that tin mining in Cornwall took place on a larger scale than can be currently demonstrated, due to evidence being lost because of subsequent tin mining during later periods.

A 2022 X-ray fluorescence and microwear analysis study of Bronze Age stone tools from Sennen, Lelant, and Truro found that the tools had been used to process semi-hard minerals, and detected traces of cassiterite tin ore on six implements, providing what the authors describe as "the earliest secure evidence for tin exploitation in Britain". The study concludes that the results "strongly suggest that Cornish tin sources were being processed from as early as c. 2300–2200 calBC, and that ores from these sources were integrated into the circulation of metals, first across Britain and Ireland and subsequently in the wider Atlantic region and beyond".

== Crafts ==
=== Lithics ===
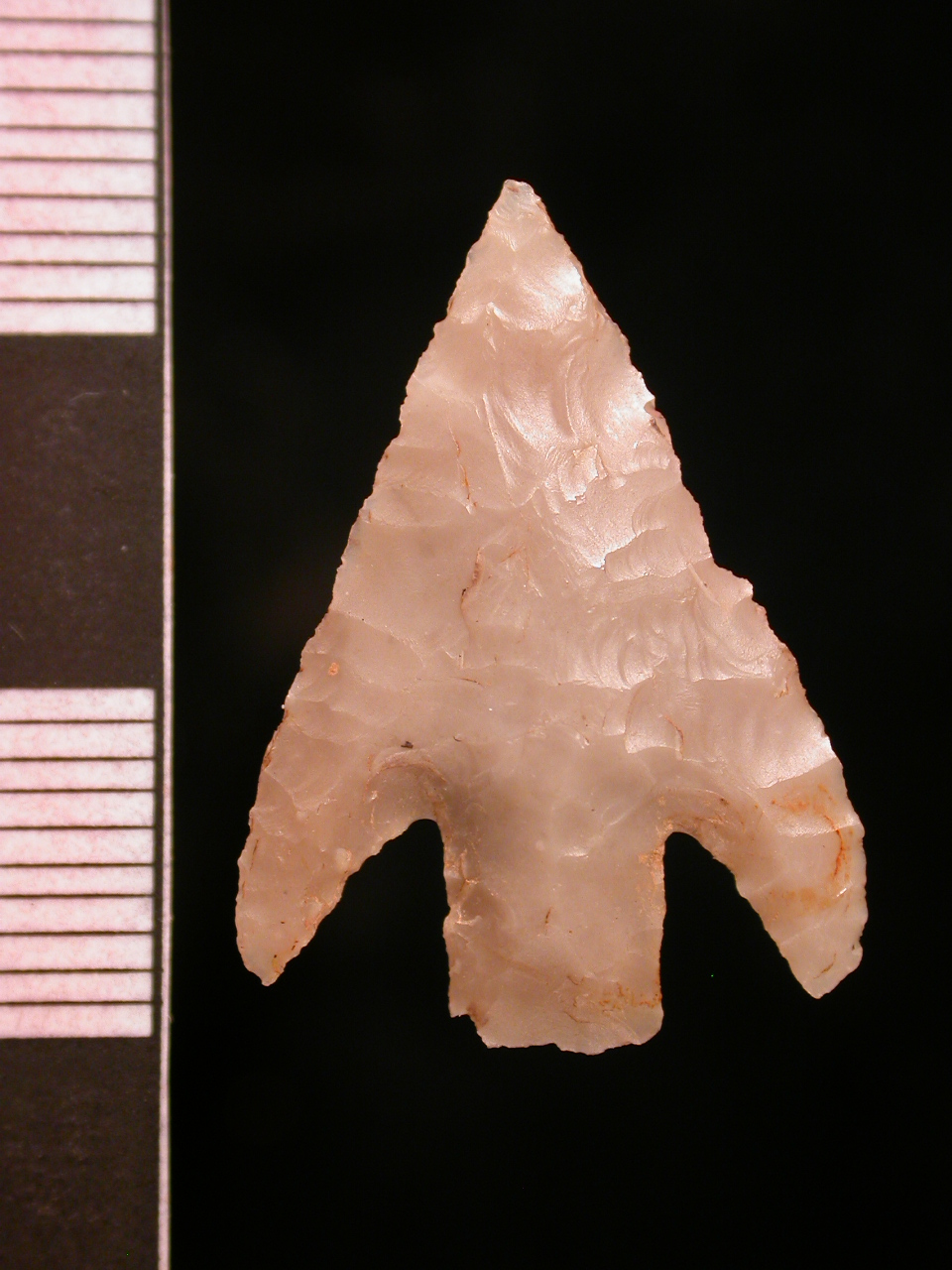
Early Bronze Age barbed and tanged arrowhead, St. Mellion

Nodular flint or chert is not found natively in Cornwall, and would have been imported as unworked nodules between the fourth and second millennia BCE. The chalk outcrop at Beer Head in south-east Devon is often suggested as a possible source of Cornish Bronze Age flint, but other sites are also possible. Nodular material can also be found in the Blackdown Hills surrounding Beer Head to the east, north, and west, and the Orleigh Court outcrop north of Dartmoor, which is closer to Cornwall. Towards the end of the second millennium the import of nodular flint became less common, and local pebbles from surrounding beaches were used, providing a varied and plentiful source of flint and chert. Flint fragments are found at sites on Bodmin Moor, such as Stannon Down, where flint is not found natively, and it would have to have been transported here, perhaps in the form of flint pebbles from the south coast.

Stone working has been described as rudimentary at some sites. According to Arthur ApSimon, stone artefacts from Trevisker "show that the Bronze Age settlement had no real tradition of flint working, in sharp contrast to the Neolithic and Early Bronze Age inhabitants of Cornwall." Flint working at Trethellan is similarly described as simplistic and lacking in innovation. There are few flint fragments here, but there are some examples of prepared cores, indicating that flint objects were produced on the site. It has been suggested that the limited evidence for stone tools is because the people at Trethellan relied instead on metal tools, which they took with them after the village had been abandoned.

Stone and flint knives, axes, and arrowheads are found at several sites. A ripple-flaked flint knife of Early Bronze Age form is found at Tremough, and a fairly high quality flint knife, probably not made of local flint, is found at Carnon Gate. A simple parallel-sided blade, two plano-convex knives, a greenstone axe, and a greenstone adze or hoe are found at Stannon. At Trevisker, stone knives are made from typical north Cornish coast beach pebbles, which has limited uses. Two objects that may have been stone axes are found at Trethellan. Flint arrowheads are found at Gwithian.

Quern-stones, used for grinding grain to make flour, are commonly found. Saddle querns (the lower, stationary quern stones) are found at sites including Stannon Down, Try, Boscawen-Un, Davidstow, Trethellan, Gwithian, and Trelowthas. A large number of mullers (the upper, mobile quern-stone) are found at Gwithian. Saddle querns, mullers, and three pestles perhaps also used to process cereals, are found at Scarcewater.

A number of stone artefacts are associated with metalworking. At Gwithian there are stone moulds, including two stone axe moulds, and hammerstones perhaps used to mine ore. A stone mould and two hammerstones are found at Trethellan. A stone racloir mould is found at Trevalga.

Scrapers, which are associated with various functions including wood, bone, and leather work, as well as food preparation, are found at Lelant, Stannon, and Scarcewater. At Gwithian there are numerous finds associated with leather working, including flensing stones, lapstones, slickstones and rubbing stones. Many of the rubbing stones found at Trethellan had flattened surfaces, and may have been used to smooth animal hides.

Other stone artefacts include part of a stone bowl found at Trethellan Farm, and cupped pebbles which are found in several barrows and may have been used as nutcrackers.

=== Pottery ===
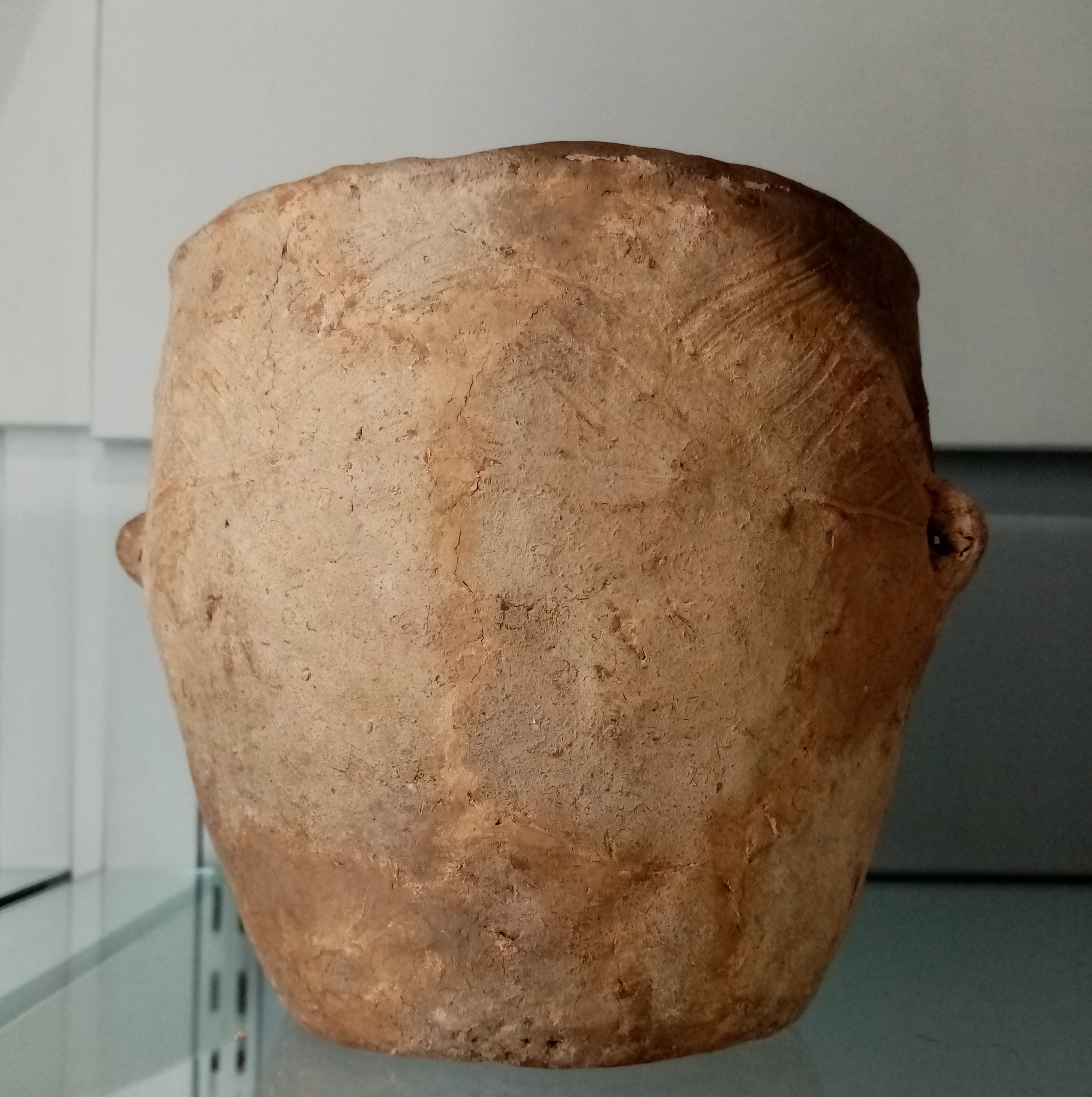
Trevisker Urn, Pedngwinian Point, Lizard

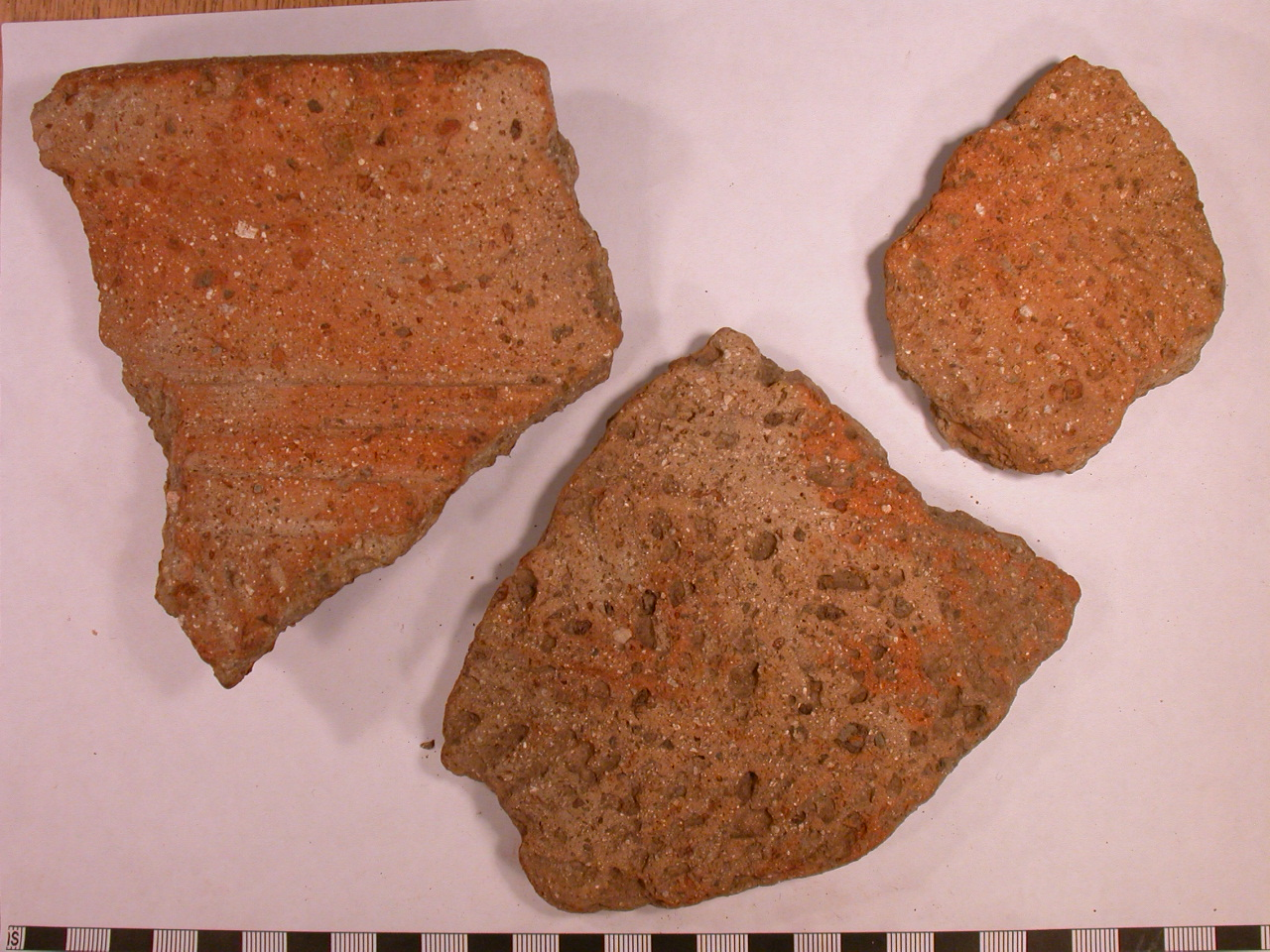
Trevisker Ware pottery sherds, perhaps part of an urn or large storage vessel, c. 1500–1150 BCE, St. Martin-in-Meneage

Gabbroic clay, which is rich in feldspar, olivines, and other minerals, is found on the Lizard peninsula, which contains the largest outcrop of gabbro rock in Britain, mainly in a 1 square kilometre (0.39 mi^{2}) area near Zoar. This clay was transported from here to areas where it does not occur locally and used to make pottery in Cornwall from the Neolithic until the Romano-British period, which is unusual, as most pottery in prehistory was typically made locally using clay from nearby sources. The earliest Bell Beaker pottery found in Cornwall is often made from a wide variety of local clays, which in some cases, such as the pottery from Poldowrian, on the Lizard, was gabbroic. But gabbroic clay was also transported to sites such as Sennen, Treyarnon, and Nancemere, where it was mixed with local clay and made into Beaker pottery. The later Food Vessels and Collared Urns were also made from a variety of clays, but with a substantial number made from gabbroic clay. Trevisker Ware in Cornwall, manufactured from c. 2000 BCE until the end of the millennium, was predominantly made from gabbroic clay.

Beaker pottery is found in Cornwall from c. 2400–1700 BCE, replacing the preceding late Neolithic Grooved ware, of which there are only a few examples in Cornwall. At the site at Sennen, radiocarbon dated to c. 2400–2100 BCE, the earliest securely dated Cornish Beaker pottery is found associated with the earliest known Bronze Age structure in Cornwall. Relatively early Beaker pottery is also found at the Lower Boscaswell site, c. 2250–1950 BCE, along with the first known burnt mound (probably used for cooking in this case) found in Cornwall, which is currently the only example of a Beaker-associated burnt mound in Britain. A relatively high concentration of Bell Beaker pottery is found in West Penwith.

Some Cornish Beaker finds, such as the locally made gabbroic pottery from Poldowrian dated c. 1890 BCE, are thought to belong to a relatively early ceramic tradition (Humphrey Case's 'style 2'), although the earliest Maritime and All-Over-Corded Beaker styles are not found at all in Cornwall, and some Beaker pottery is found together with Food Vessels and Trevisker Ware. Furthermore, Beaker pottery in burial contexts is regularly associated with cremation rather than the single-inhumation typical of earlier Beaker burials in other parts of Britain, all of which implies that most of the Beaker ceramics in Cornwall are of relatively late date. At Try, Gulval, radiocarbon dating of an incomplete handled Beaker suggests that Beaker pottery continued to circulate until as late as c. 1700 BCE. At the earliest Cornish Beaker sites, Beaker vessels are associated with food preparation, consumption, and sharing, perhaps at social rituals. This may have gradually changed to ritual use associated with monuments by the end of the Beaker period.

Food Vessels, Collared Urns, and Trevisker Ware pottery styles begin to appear c. 2000 BCE. Examples of Food Vessels are found at Carvinack, Treligga, Watch Hill (c. 1920–1680 BCE), and perhaps Cataclews (c. 2030–1680 BCE). Collared Urns, usually associated with cremation remains, are found in barrows at Trannak, Bears Down, Gaverigan, Davidstow (dated c. 2500–1900 BCE, based on charcoal beneath the urn, probably giving an incorrect early date), Colliford (1720–1960 BCE), and the entrance grave at Tregiffian (c. 1980–1680 BCE, based on charcoal inside the urn).

Trevisker Ware is thought to have originated in Cornwall c. 2000 BCE, and is initially found in funerary or ritual contexts. Trevisker Ware was the most common ceramic style of the Cornish Early Bronze Age, and the almost exclusively used ceramic type of the Cornish Middle Bronze Age. Trevisker Ware has also been found in Devon, Somerset, Dorset, Kent, Wales, Dalkey Island in County Dublin, and Brittany. It continued to be produced in Cornwall for almost a millennium, and ceramic finds from Gwithian indicate that Trevisker Ware was still used in the tenth century BCE. It began to be replaced around the end of the second millennium by Late Bronze Age Plain Ware. Parker Pearson suggests that Trevisker Ware developed from the preceding locally made Collared Urns, Cordoned Urns, and Food Vessels. Alternatively, Andy Jones argues that Trevisker Ware developed primarily from the earlier Grooved Ware, as well as other late Neolithic pottery styles. Trevisker Ware ceramics are usually biconical or have curved sides, with strengthened rims, decorated above the girth with parallel lines, zig-zags, or chevrons, using cord, combs, fingertips, or fingernails. Trevisker Ware vessels include large storage jars, medium-sized storage, cooking, and eating vessels, and smaller vessels for eating and drinking. Like some of the preceding Grooved Ware, Beakers, Food Vessels, and Collared Urns in Cornwall, Trevisker Ware was usually produced from distinctive gabbroic clays from the Lizard peninsula, and both the pottery and clay itself were transported from the Lizard, in some cases a considerable distance. Direct evidence for pottery production is scarce, but the presence of unfinished pots and raw gabbroic clay at Gwithian show that ceramics were produced at this site. It has been suggested that the spread of Trevisker pottery in the later Bronze Age may be connected with increased metal prospecting, trading, and exploitation.

On Scilly, a parallel ceramic tradition exists, which differs from the Trevisker style of the mainland, with less complex, mainly horizontal lines of decoration. Some vessels are also found here in the Trevisker style. Ceramics on Scilly were probably made from local clays. At Annet Farm, on St Agnes, there is evidence for clay extraction and possibly ceramic production.

Late Bronze Age Plain Ware pottery, from perhaps c. 1000 BCE to 800 BCE, includes simple straight-walled jars and carinated bowls. Only undecorated ('Plain') Ware is found in Cornwall, the Decorated Ware found elsewhere in Southern Britain is not found. Like the Trevisker Ware, Plain Ware continued to be produced using gabbroic clay.

=== Metalwork ===
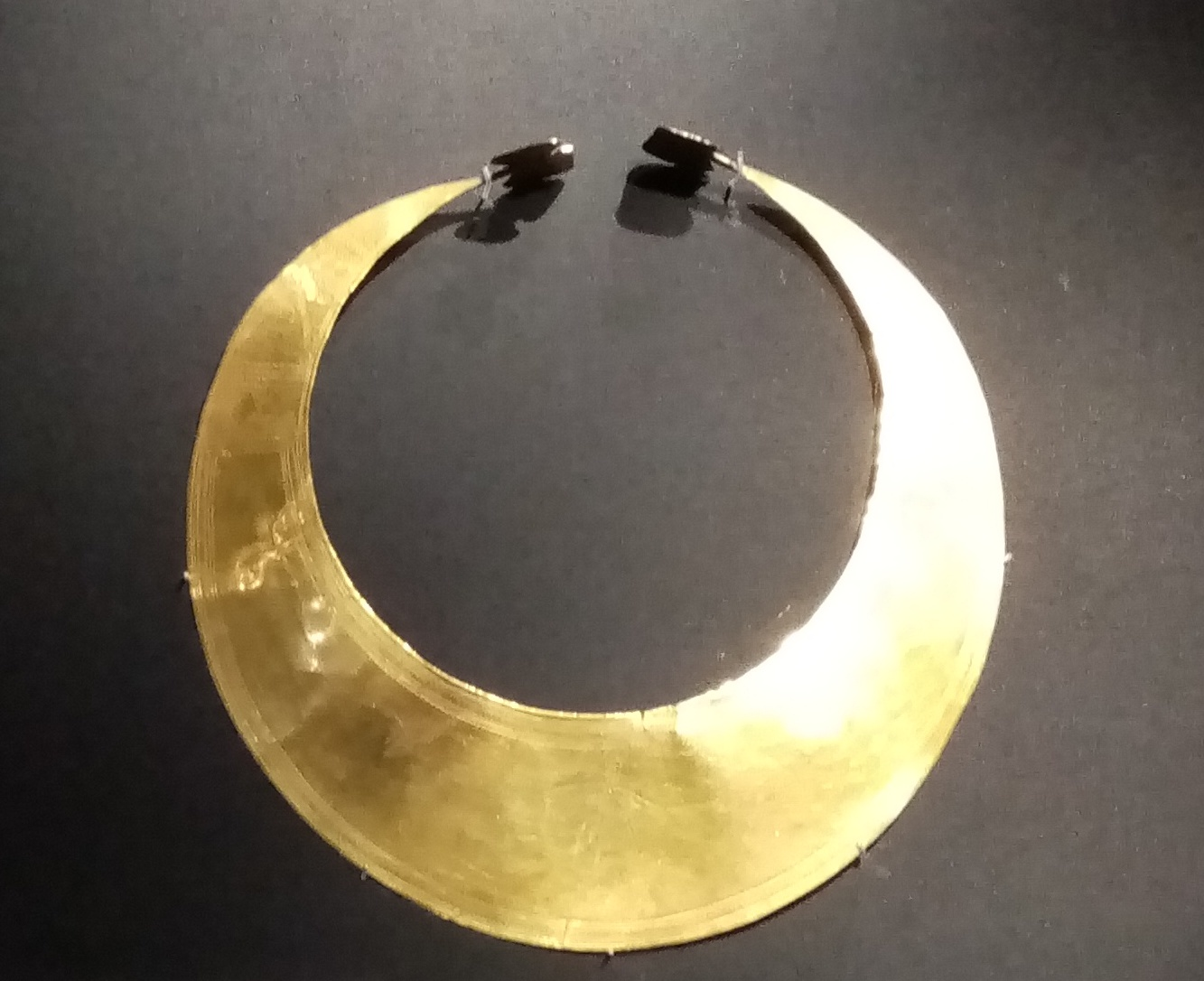
St Juliot lunula

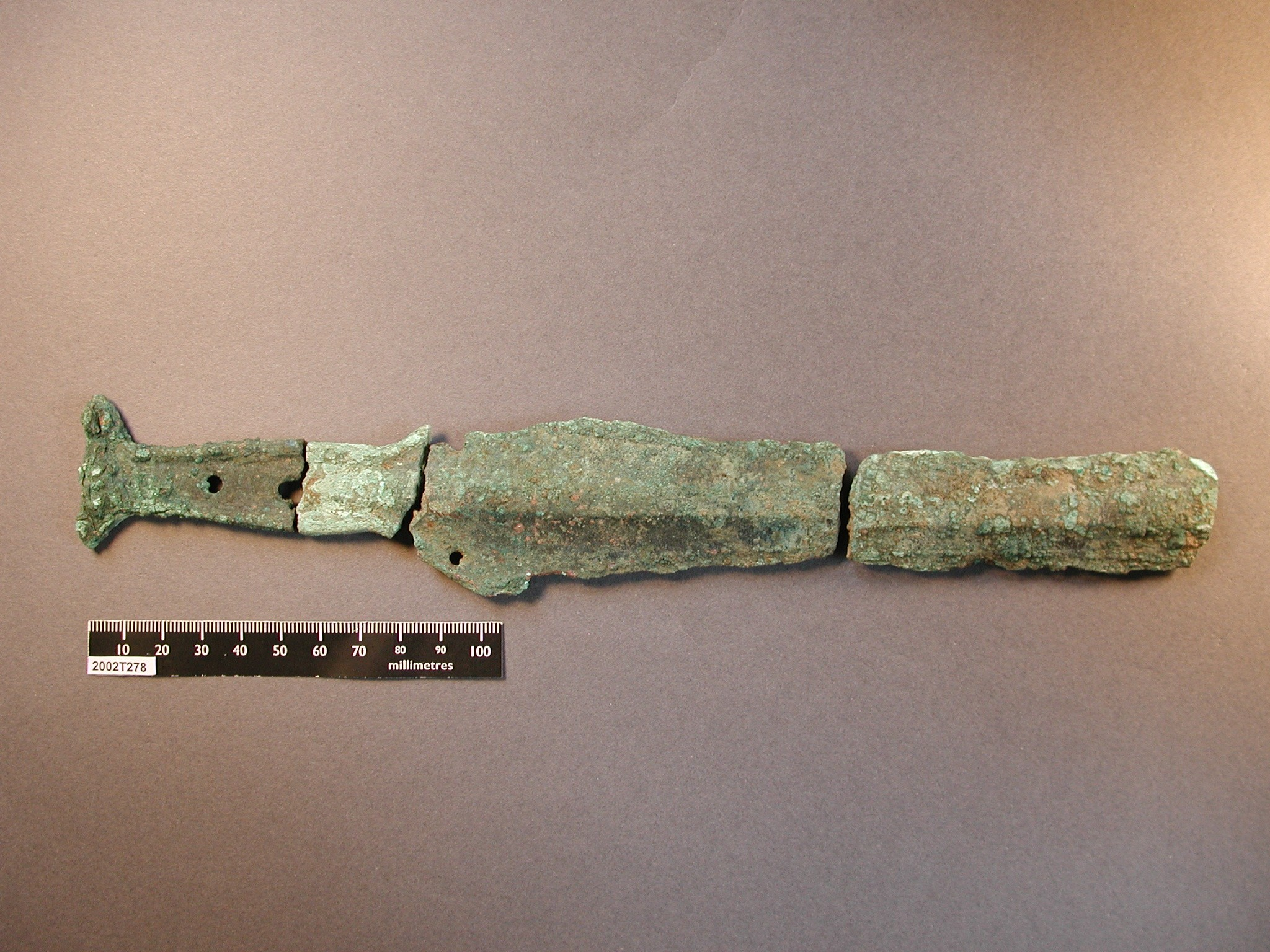
Bronze Age sword from St Erth hoard

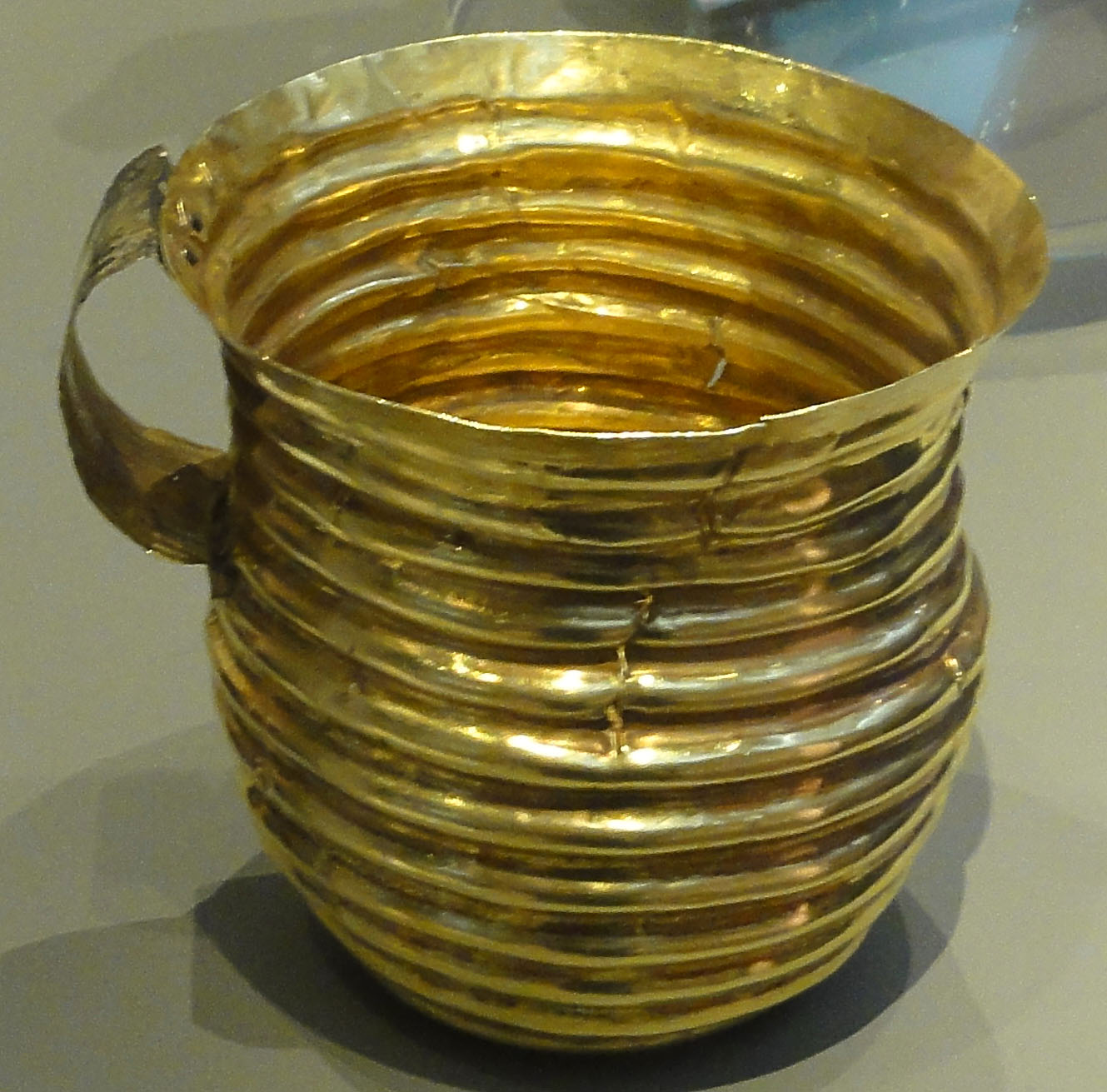
The Rillaton Cup, or Linkinhorne gold beaker

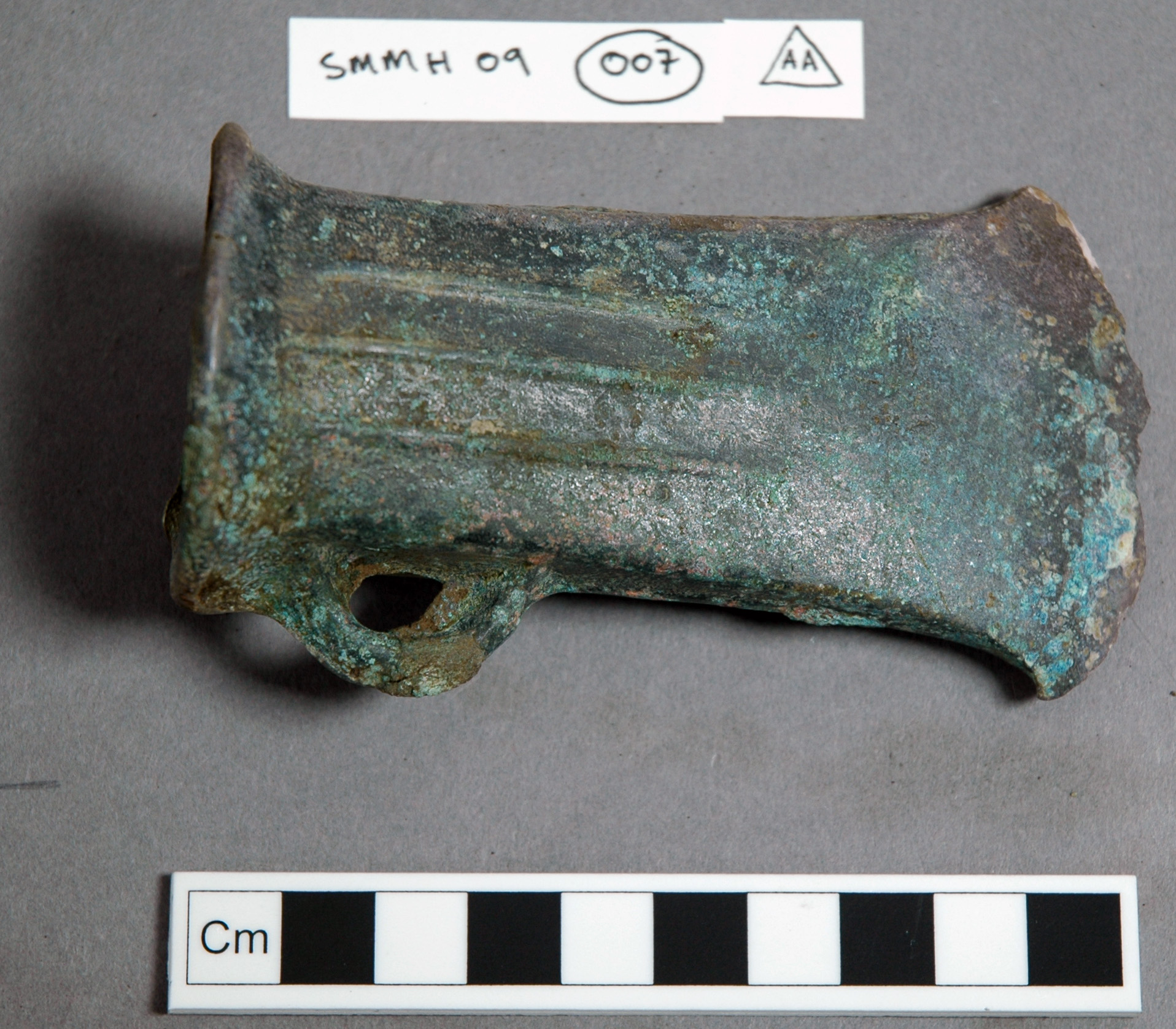
Socketed axe, St Michael's Mount

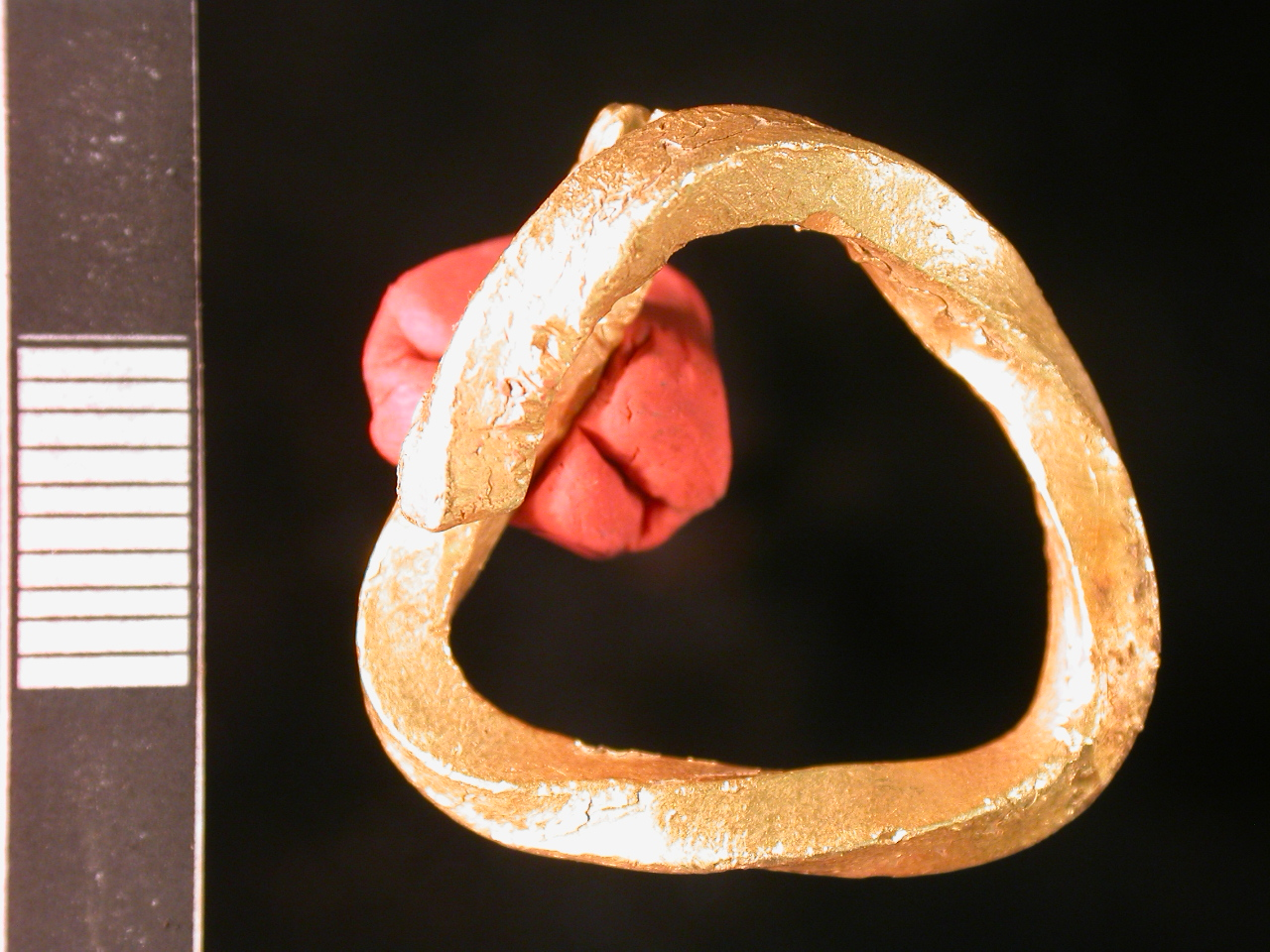
Torc fragment, Gwithian

A range of metal artefacts have been discovered, some of which may have been locally produced. At Gwithian for instance, clay and stone moulds, hammerstones, and anvils indicate small-scale metalworking. At the Trethellan site, in addition to a small number of bronze artefacts, a stone mould, possible hammerstones, and copper alloy waste were found, suggesting that secondary metalworking may have been practised here. At a domestic structure in Tremough c. 1900–1600 BCE, several items, including a cassiterite pebble, stone chisel moulds, a socketed hammer, a socketed axe, and droplets of copper alloy, indicate that this was probably the home of a metallurgist. Another probable metallurgist's house dating to c.1400–1300 BCE is found at Trevalga. A mould for a copper alloy racloir, a triangular blade with a central perforation, commonly found in France at the time but with only four examples of this type found in Britain, is found here, perhaps indicating that local metalsmiths were familiar with contemporary French metalwork forms, and may have been producing such work for export.

Gold objects are rare, but relatively densely concentrated. The Trevose Head, Cataclews, and Harlyn Bay area in St Merryn parish comprises the largest collection of Early Bronze Age gold and metalwork in South West Britain. Notable gold artefacts include the famous Rillaton gold cup, recovered from a stone cist in the Rillaton barrow. It is dated c. 1950–1750 BCE, and is said to be similar to the Fritzdorf gold cup in its handle construction and rivets.

Additionally, a total of four gold lunulae are known, two from a cist at Harlyn Bay, one from a barrow (or perhaps a marsh) in St. Juliot, and one found either at Paul or, more likely, at Gwithian, perhaps at Trevarnon Round. Lunulae are high-status, flat, crescent-shaped gold collars, often decorated with geometric designs that are in many cases very similar to those found on Bell Beaker pottery. They almost certainly originated in Ireland, where the vast majority of examples are found, and circulated along the Atlantic Façade around the beginning of the second millennium BCE. As well as Ireland and Cornwall, lunulae are also found in Scotland, Wales, Brittany, and Normandy. Outside of Cornwall, lunulae are only rarely found in barrow contexts. The presence of traces of tin in the gold lunulae from Harlyn Bay and St. Juliot suggest that the gold may derive from a local Cornish alluvial source.

Of the four Cornish lunulae, the St. Juliot and Gwithian lunulae and one of the Harlyn Bay lunulae are of Classical type, the most accomplished of all the lunulae styles. They are the only confirmed examples of this type found outside of Ireland, where they may have been manufactured and then exported to Cornwall. The other Harlyn Bay lunula is of Provincial type, a style which is almost never found in Ireland. It has been suggested that Provincial lunulae can be identified with specific individual smiths. The Harlyn Bay Provincial lunula is supposed to have been made by the same smith who made the St Potan and Kerivoa lunulae found in Brittany, all of which seem to have been decorated using an identical tool. Rather than producing lunulae and then transporting them, itinerant smiths may have transported raw gold ingots or obtained raw materials locally, travelling by sea with a portable smithy and producing lunulae near where they would be sold, a lifestyle that would have required long distance communication, organization, and political tolerance for such activities. Andy Jones however believes that all four Cornish lunulae were made in Ireland, and more recent studies have disputed the 'itinerant smith' model, showing that, while smiths may sometimes have travelled from place to place, they were usually controlled by the local hierarchy. At Gwithian, the prodigious metalworking activity that occurred here throughout the Bronze Age has been explained as multiple smiths working within a small family industry, who probably did not travel far from their local area.

Early Bronze Age daggers have been found from sites at Penatilly, Sennen, Trewinard, and Trelowarren. Styles include Camerton-Snowshill daggers, dated by accompanying pottery to after c. 2000 BCE, which are found at the Mullion, Caerloggas, Harlyn Bay, Pelynt, and Rillaton sites, and knife-daggers, found at Fore Down (radiocarbon dated c. 1900–1740 BCE) and Rosecliston, Newquay (radiocarbon dated c. 1881–1624 BCE). The Pelynt sword hilt, also known as the Pelynt dagger, dated c. 1350–1100 BCE and of Aegean type, apparently was not found at a barrow in Pelynt and may not even have been found in the area. It may have been inserted into a mound at a relatively late date.

A copper 'ox-hide' ingot weighing 72 kilograms (159 lb) was discovered on the seabed near Looe in 1985. Ingots of this type are generally dated to the second millennium BCE, are usually found in the Mediterranean and Aegean seas, and are rare in Britain.

A number of metal hoards are found towards the end of the Bronze Age, including the Towednack hoard, comprising two twisted gold bar torcs, gold bracelets, and gold rods, the Morvah hoard of gold bracelets, and the Mylor Axe hoard.

=== Other crafts ===
The discovery of flax seeds and a clay spindle whorl and weights at the Trethellan site indicate that small-scale textile production was practised here. Textiles are rarely preserved, but at Harlyn Bay mineralized textile fragments are found, and the imprint of a woven object is found in the clay under a barrow at Carvinack.

At Gwithian, a diverse range of stone, bone, and shell artefacts are found which were probably used in wood, textile, leather, and metal working, possibly in specialized workshops.

In Scilly, massive stone bowls and troughs and residues on pottery suggest that large-scale processing of oils from marine animals occurred here, probably for export.

== Amber, glass, and faience ==
Amber is relatively rare in Cornwall during the Bronze Age. The few examples, which include a lump of amber from Caerloggas, an amber V-perforated button from Boscregan and another of the same type near Woolley barrow, and one amber bead from Stannon and another from Trevassack Hill, Hayle, were probably obtained from the Wessex culture to the east.

Faience ('glazed composition'), in this context, is a non-ceramic material with a quartz core and glaze, mixed with a plant-ash flux to assist fusion of the quartz grains. The glaze also contained copper, producing a distinctive turquoise colour. In British and Irish beads, tin appears to have been added to the faience paste, which served no purpose but may have been symbolic, or a socially significant act of conspicuous consumption. Faience would have been a prestigious novelty item, which may have been thought to have magical properties. The knowledge required to make faience probably arrived in Britain c. 2000 BCE, perhaps from contact with central European communities who were importing tin. Faience beads are found at several sites, including Hendraburnick Down, Boscregan, and Leskernick. The reported 'glass' beads from Rillaton Barrow, now lost, were probably faience. Star-shaped beads were found at Stannon Down, Trelowthas, and Knackyboy Cairn. Some faience beads were clearly made locally, including the star-shaped bead from Stannon and the beads from Boscregan.

== Art ==
A regional tradition of rock art is found in Cornwall where cup-marks are made on stones. Originating in the Neolithic, they subsequently were found on Bronze Age barrows and roundhouses in the second millennium BCE. More than thirty cup-mark sites are found in Cornwall.

Cup-marked stones may have been used to refer to links between barrow sites and other parts of the landscape, as well as to the people participating at rituals at barrows. Cup-marked stones in barrows may have played an especially important role in Early Bronze Age North Cornwall. In this region, a large number of round barrows at sites including Tregulland, Starapark, Tichbarrow, and Treligga contain cup-marked stones.

Cup-markings are found on stones deposited inside Middle Bronze Age roundhouses, as well as on larger stones integrated into their structure. In roundhouses, cup-marked stones may have been "powerful symbols associated with previous occupants or ancestors, and perhaps functioned as protective amulets." Some of these stones may have been obtained from places in the landscape that were perceived as somehow 'powerful'.

== Trade and cultural networks ==
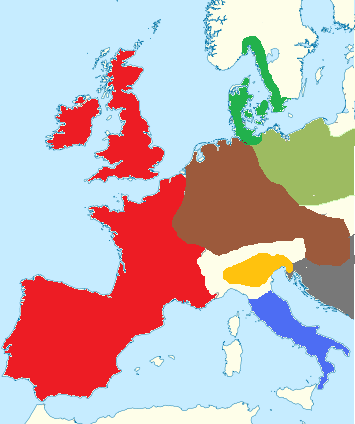
Atlantic Bronze Age (red)

Artefacts found in Cornwall such as the gold lunulae, a type which almost certainly originated in Ireland, the Rillaton gold cup, which probably represents a common tradition of metalcraft across northwest Europe, and the Pelynt sword hilt, probably made in Mycenaean Greece, demonstrate that Cornwall was part of a large and expansive trade network from at least the Early Bronze Age.

At the beginning of the second millennium BCE, social and economic ties between Cornwall and Atlantic communities such as those of Ireland and Brittany were probably more intensive than those between Cornwall and other parts of southern Britain. Later in the Bronze Age, there is evidence for greater contact with the Wessex culture, including the use of Trevisker Ware outside of Cornwall to the east, and the presence of 'Wessex II' artefacts such as Camerton-Snowshill daggers and pygmy cups in Cornwall.

Genetic evidence and shared traditions such as megalithic tomb building demonstrate substantial interaction and migration of people along the Atlantic Façade already during the Neolithic. Continuing contact during the Bronze Age is demonstrated by the widespread occurrence of artefacts such as Bell Beaker pottery, and implied by the evidence for the existence of Bronze Age sewn-plank boats. It has been suggested that the long and dangerous sea voyages that allowed material culture and ideology to travel along the Atlantic façade were unlikely to have taken place for economic reasons, and may have been rituals or quests of some sort, perhaps legitimizing members of elite groups or bestowing fame on those who undertook them. Funerary traditions such as the burials at Harlyn and the entrance graves from West Penwith and Scilly, and the gold lunulae from Harlyn Bay, St Juliot, and Gwithian, are associated with a wider Atlantic tradition and indicative of an enduring network of cultural and economic exchange with other cultures of the Atlantic Bronze Age. The three Classical lunulae found in Cornwall, the only confirmed examples of this type outside of Ireland, imply strong links between Cornwall and Ireland during the late 3rd millennium BCE, perhaps driven by the export of tin and gold to south-west Ireland. It is likely that a significant proportion of the gold used to make artefacts in Bronze Age Britain and Ireland was sourced in Cornwall. Analysis of 50 Irish gold artefacts found that the chemical composition of these objects was not consistent with any known Irish gold source, and instead suggests that south-west Britain, perhaps Cornwall, was the most likely source. This may imply that gold used in Irish artefacts was deliberately obtained from distant, 'mysterious' sources. The Harlyn Bay site comprises the largest and richest finds from any Early Bronze Age complex in Cornwall, and may have been an important prehistoric port for the exchange of goods, ideas, monumental styles, and marriage partners within a network of coastal communities along the Atlantic façade.

Recent studies have shown that the tin and gold (but not the copper) used to manufacture the Nebra sky disc probably originated from Cornwall. The gold was most likely to have been obtained from the Carnon River. In 2020, a small spiral ring made of gold wire was found near Ammerbuch-Reusten, Tübingen, with a female skeleton directly dated to the Early Bronze Age c. 1861–1616 BCE, the earliest securely dated precious metal find in South-West Germany. Analysis of the gold showed that the gold probably derived from Cornwall, again specifically from the Carnon River.

Chemical and isotopic analysis of several tin ingots from five sites in the Eastern Mediterranean c. 1530–1300 BCE showed relatively high indium concentration, typical of Cornish cassiterite. The study suggests that the tin for these ingots was most likely to have been obtained from Carnmenellis granite. The study argues that the collapse of eastern trade routes caused by the decline of the Levant states interrupted tin supplies, leading to a search for new tin sources from Europe and Britain. The shift in the tin trade to Europe, and specifically Cornwall, was contemporaneous with the rise of the Mycenaean civilization.

Trevisker Ware ceramics, which originated in Cornwall, are occasionally found much further away in Somerset, Dorset, Wiltshire, Hampshire, the Isle of Wight, South Wales, Dublin, and Brittany. Some examples, including a Trevisker Ware vessel dated to c. 1600–1320 BCE found nearly 500 kilometres (310 mi) in Kent were made using gabbroic clay from the Lizard and may have been manufactured at Trethellan. Pottery at Hambledon Hill, in Dorset is also made from gabbroic clay from the Lizard, and the presence of Cornish heath (Erica vagans) at this site may indicate that prestige goods or raw materials including gabbroic clay were transported here from the Lizard peninsula. More usually however, Trevisker Ware found far away from Cornwall is made from non-gabbroic clay, implying that potters were familiar enough with Trevisker Ware styles to produce similar ceramics locally.

== Social organization ==
Important power centres included the Harlyn Bay area, the Colliford, Rillaton, and Pelynt group, the Mount's Bay area, the groups of settlements in West Penwith and the Lizard, and the various barrow groups in North and Central Cornwall.

The introduction of new types of weapons, expanding trade networks, prestige items including gold torcs and armrings, rich barrows like Rillaton, and structural modifications to tor enclosures, may imply the existence of a small local warrior elite in Cornwall by the Late Bronze Age. Christie suggests that a small group of elite 'lunulae wearers' may have emerged in the Early Bronze Age, perhaps resulting in a social hierarchy that continued throughout the second millennium. William O'Brien has proposed a similar contemporary elite group of 'lunula lords' in Ireland associated with copper metallurgy, who controlled copper supplies and wore gold to demonstrate their high status and display their wealth.

Christopher Tilley proposes that, rather than attempting to control land, crops, animals, raw materials, or prestige goods, Cornish Bronze Age elites instead focussed on controlling "knowledges deemed essential to the reproduction and well-being of the social group". According to Tilley, the construction and control of monuments was one of the main instruments for the reproduction of power, and played a principal role in the creation and preservation of authority. Tilley argues that monuments were used by a class of ritual specialists who guided and instructed the rest of the population, emphasizing the spiritual significance and history of these sacred places in a continuing process where previous Neolithic traditions and ideas surrounding monuments and topography were modified and appropriated, to legitimize the contemporary society and its associated power structures.

Alternatively Peter Herring argues that the social structure of upland farming communities on Bodmin Moor in the Middle Bronze Age is reflected in the landscape organization seen in the field systems, which Herring suggests seem to have been constructed by people who knew the land well and had an interest in their successful functioning, and so represents the result of a collective form of decision-making rather than an authoritarian imposition from above. Herring argues that settlements may have produced specialized goods, perhaps necessitating an extensive exchange system organized by some sort of local authority similar to a prehistoric 'district council', which was perhaps composed of the same members of society as the lower levels of individuals, households, and cooperatives, and may have performed functions such as controlling access to summer grazing land, in the interests of the community as a whole.

Barbara Bender summarizes the social hierarchy at the Leskernick Hill settlement:

Stonehenge was being built 250 miles to the east and there were powerful chieftains, drinking from gold cups, wearing gold lunulae, much closer to hand; perhaps even as close as Rough Tor. It is indeed highly likely that the people of Leskernick were panning for local metals, had close contacts with distant chiefdoms, but, so far at least, our sense is of a limited vertical hierarchy.

== Environment and ecology ==
The magnitude and extent of climatic deterioration at the beginning of the Late Bronze Age has been the subject of debate for several decades, with evidence provided from palynology, ice-sheet dynamics, estimations of solar activity, and especially data from ombrogenous bogs (peat-forming mires above groundwater level). According to the chronology presented by Tony Brown in a 2008 review of the British Bronze Age, the so-called 4.2-kiloyear event (c. 2250 BCE) brought cooler, wetter conditions throughout Britain, resulting in a period of decreased average temperatures between the Holocene maximum and the Medieval Warm Period from c. 2050 BCE to 550 BCE. According to Brown, bog surface wetness (BSW, a proxy for past climatic conditions) was stable or slightly reduced from c. 2000 BCE to c. 1800–1500 BCE, after which there was an increase in BSW (i.e. a rise in bog-water tables, and hence a wetter climate) which lasted 200 to 300 years, ending c. 1200 BCE, after which there was a drier period lasting until c. 800–750 BCE, when there was a rise in bog-water tables across the whole of Europe.

The gradual abandonment of upland settlements on Bodmin Moor c. 1000 BCE has been attributed to climatic degradation, resulting in soil deterioration, expanding areas of peat, and poor harvests. A 2016 study found a relationship between a peak in wetness c. 1000 BCE and a cessation of human activity in upland areas in south-west Britain, suggesting that upland farming communities may have been vulnerable to climate changes and adapted by moving to the lowlands. Others have argued that in some areas, including Bodmin Moor, there is no evidence for climate and soil deterioration, and other factors may have encouraged a general migration to lowland zones. Gearey et al. state that their 1999 pollen analysis of Bodmin Moor did not support the theory that uplands were abandoned due to deterioration of grazing pasture. Andy Jones has argued that the hypothesis of widespread abandonment as a result of climatic deterioration of upland areas of the south-west region c. 1000 BCE is unlikely to be correct, and proposes that instead, a more complex pattern of land use or ownership developed after this time in upland zones. Peter Herring has argued that, rather than individual farmers abandoning upland zones as a response to environmental changes, there was instead a collective decision to reorganize upland grazing zones, in response to human population growth and increasing herd sizes on the uplands. Gearey et al. state that "the search for any one factor to explain the end of extensive Bronze Age settlement is over-simplistic", and instead argue that "an interplay of socio-economic and environmental factors may be responsible for the shift in emphasis from upland to lowland". They highlight Brisbane and Clewes' conclusion that the apparent relationship between increased areas of wet acidic grassland and the abandonment of coaxial field systems in the East Moor may be merely coincidental, rather than causal.

Analysis of pollen samples shows that moderately dense mixed oak-hazel woodland dominated prehistoric South West Britain. Over the course of the Bronze Age these woodlands were substantially cleared, creating large areas of open grassland and scrub. Evidence for woodland clearance is found at several sites. On Bodmin Moor, pollen core evidence is found at Rough Tor South, c. 1670–1430 BCE, where mixed oak, hazel, and birch woodland declines, with expansion of grass, ribwort plantain, and common heather. At Tresellern Marsh, c. 1130–940 BCE, pollen cores indicate the rapid disappearance of alder woodland before 1260–900 BCE. At Stannon Down, woodland clearance began in the Neolithic, although there is still a significant area of woodland here at the beginning of the Early Bronze Age. Clearance accelerated throughout this period, and settlement activity and the creation of enclosures resulted in substantial reduction in woodland coverage. By the Middle Bronze Age large areas of land at Stannon had been transformed into open grassland with diverse vegetation, with trees mainly restricted to the valleys. Some wooded areas may have been retained in order to provide a symbolic setting for the cairns here. At Higher Moors, St Mary's, Scilly, woodland clearance may have occurred during the mid to late Bronze Age, followed by a regeneration of birch woodland. Woodland regeneration is not found at other sites on Scilly, and so the evidence from Higher Moors may not indicate woodland regeneration on Scilly as a whole.

Evidence for managed woodland and meadows is found at some sites. At Lower Boscaswell, analysis of charcoal remains may indicate that woodland management was practised in the Early Bronze Age, and mixed oak-hazel woodland was probably managed at Tremough. Evidence that wood was quickly grown at Scarcewater also implies that woodland was managed here, probably to provide the large amounts of timber required for roundhouse building and avoid conflict with neighbouring communities. The diverse species of Bronze Age grassland vegetation at Roughtor suggests hay meadow management and seasonal grazing activity.

== Ethnicity, genetics, and language ==
There is no evidence that the current boundaries of Cornwall had any meaning for the people who inhabited this region in the Bronze Age, and it is probable that the Bronze Age inhabitants of what is now Cornwall had complex identities based around family, honour ties, and their local geography and community. For instance, Andy Jones argues that the characteristic style of hollow-set roundhouses in the lowlands may indicate the existence of a distinctive lowland regional identity. Gary Robinson proposes that Early Bronze Age seafaring activity in Scilly would have created a sense of mutual trust and community, contributing to the creation of a "common island identity". Peter Herring suggests that the group of Bronze Age monuments in Penwith including The Pipers and The Merry Maidens may have been constructed by a newly arrived group of people in West Penwith, who were perhaps seeking to legitimize themselves by adapting earlier monuments.

Recent archaeogenetics studies have detected two major migration waves into Britain during this period. The first, beginning c. 2450 BCE, corresponds to the arrival of a population associated with the Bell Beaker culture and carrying substantial levels of Yamnaya-related ('Steppe') ancestry, which resulted in a minimum of 90% local population turnover by c. 1500–1000 BCE. This also resulted in the replacement of around 90% of the Y-chromosomes with subclades of the previously absent haplogroup R1b, and it introduced a range of mtDNA haplogroups that were not found in Britain before. The spread of Beaker culture is variously associated with certain stages of Indo-European languages by some linguists and archaeologists, including Old European (Alteuropäisch), pre-Celtic, and Proto-Celtic. There is no consensus on what language the people of the Beaker culture spoke. The second, a migration into Britain from sources that best fit populations from France, resulted in a substantial increase in Early European Farmer ancestry in Britain between c. 1000 and c. 875 BCE, which a 2022 study has suggested may represent a plausible vector for the introduction of early Celtic languages into Britain.

DNA analysis has been performed on the remains of two Cornish Bronze Age humans. At the Harlyn Bay site, an Early Bronze Age cist, the skeleton of a young female directly dated to the Chalcolithic and Early Bronze Age period c. 2285–2036 BCE was assigned mtDNA haplogroup R1b. Using a three-way model of ancestral components, this individual could be modelled as 11.1% Western European Hunter-Gatherer (WHG), 29.5% Early European Farmer (EEF), and 59.4% Steppe ancestry. The Bronze Age barrow on Constantine Island contained an ancient individual directly dated to the Middle Bronze Age (c. 1381–1056 BCE). The individual was found to be male, with Y-DNA haplogroup R-BY27831 (R1b1a1b1a1a2a), a subclade of R-DF27, and mtDNA haplogroup U5b2b2. Using a three-way model, this individual could be modelled as 11.5% WHG, 34.3% EEF, and 54.1% Steppe ancestry.

== See also ==
- Armorican Tumulus culture
