= Trevisker Ware =

Pottery type

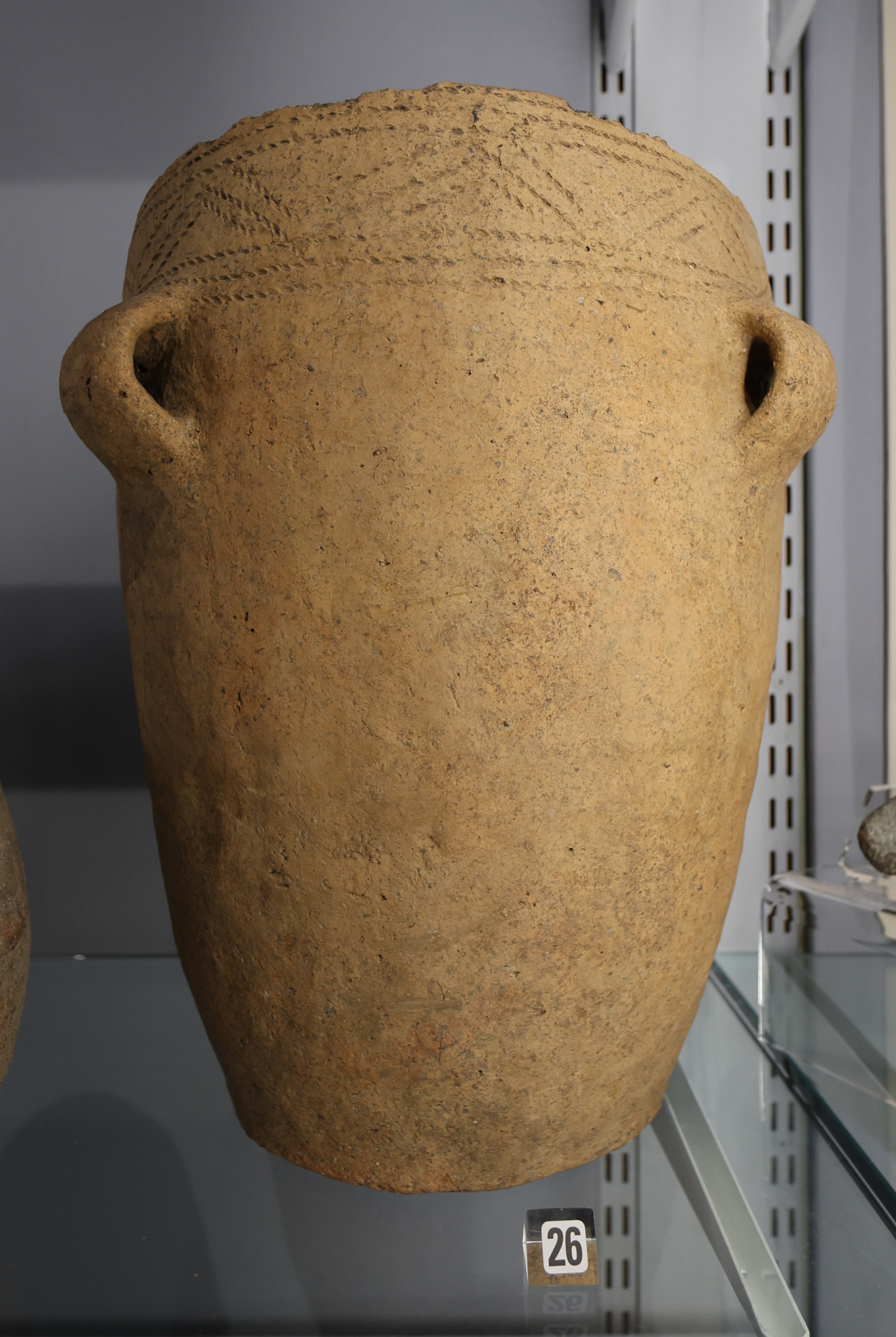
A Trevisker Ware vessel, found at Gerrans, Cornwall

Trevisker Ware (also called Trevisker Series) is a distinctive Bronze Age ceramic tradition associated primarily with Cornwall and other parts of south-west Britain. Named after the settlement of Trevisker near St Eval, it emerged around 2000 BCE and represents a regional variant of the British Food Urn tradition, which evolved from earlier Bell Beaker styles. Trevisker Ware is characterized by a wide range of forms and decorative motifs and was produced from a variety of locally available clays, most commonly gabbroic clay from the Lizard peninsula. Initially found mainly in funeral and ceremonial contexts, Trevisker Ware was later used in settlement contexts and remained in use for approximately 1,000 years.

== Research history ==
The distinctive character of Bronze Age pottery in Cornwall was recognized in the early twentieth century. The Trevisker Ware series was defined and named by Arthur ApSimon in 1972, based on the material recovered from the settlement at Trevisker, near St Eval in Cornwall. The site had been excavated in 1955-1956 by Ernest Greenfield, and the large ceramic assemblage provided the type series from which the tradition takes its name.

== Chronology ==
Trevisker Ware is considered a regionally distinctive expression of the British Food Urn tradition, which developed from earlier Bell Beaker styles. It likely emerged around 2000 BCE, roughly contemporaneous with Collared Urns and Food Vessels, and remained in use until c. 1000 BCE. It was then replaced in Cornwall by post-Deverel Rimbury (Late Bronze Age Plain Wares) styles which originated further east around 1100 BCE. The long duration of Trevisker Ware is unique among Bronze Age pottery in Britain, although the reasons for this continuity are not yet understood.

== Geographic distribution ==
Trevisker Ware appears to have originated in Cornwall, where it was the predominant Bronze Age ceramic type during the 2nd millennium BCE. It is also found to a lesser extent in Devon, and occasionally at more distant sites. In Scilly, a related Bronze Age ceramic tradition developed ('Scillonian Bronze Age'), with its own distinctive vessel forms and decorative practices. A small number of Scillonian vessels have been identified as belonging to the Trevisker tradition.

Dartmoor seems to have functioned as a ceramic style boundary during the Early and Middle Bronze Age, allowing Trevisker Ware to move eastward, but restricting eastern styles from spreading west of Somerset and Devon. By the Middle Bronze Age, Trevisker Ware is attested across southern Britain, including Wiltshire, Hampshire, the Isle of Wight, South Wales, and Kent, as well as in County Dublin, northern France (Pas-de-Calais) and Brittany. Either raw gabbroic clay from the Lizard, or more likely finished Cornish Trevisker Ware vessels, were transported considerable distances from their source, possibly as gifts or traded items.

== Typology ==
Earlier research aimed to establish a chronological framework, with ApSimon proposing four broad styles corresponding to gradual changes in vessel shape and decoration. Subsequent research has shown that ApSimon's styles frequently co-occur within single archaeological contexts and stratigraphic layers, undermining a strictly chronological interpretation, and variations in form and decoration are now argued to reflect differences in function rather than changes over time, although there is some tentative evidence to support a chronological division into Early, Middle, and Late phases. Michael Parker-Pearson (1990) classified Trevisker Ware into six functional groups, ranging from large storage vessels, often decorated with cord impressions, to medium sized jars used for cooking, storage, or serving, and small vessels interpreted as individual eating and drinking containers.

Trevisker Ware exhibits a wide range of vessel sizes, forms, and decorative styles. Typical shapes include biconical or bucket-shaped vessels with curved sides and everted or strengthened rims. Handles and lugs, when present, are positioned near the shoulder. Decoration is generally confined to the upper part of the vessel, ranging from simple horizontal lines to complex chevrons and zigzags. Decorative techniques include the use of cord impressions, incised lines, stamping, fingertip or fingernail marks, and occasionally comb patterns. Some vessels are entirely undecorated. On Scillonian vessels, decoration was typically more simple, consisting of horizontal lines.

== Fabric and production ==
Most Trevisker Ware from Cornwall was made using gabbroic clay from the Lizard peninsula, often containing mixed mineral inclusions. This fabric produced a distinctive and durable ceramic. Potters deliberately chose this clay even when they lived some distance from its source and closer, easier clays existed. Scillonian vessels were probably made from locally-sourced granitic clays. In Devon, Trevisker Ware was generally made from local non-gabbroic clays, often granite-based and tempered with greenstone or quartz. Production appears to have relied on two main clay sources from near Dartmoor, and only a small number of Devon vessels were made using Cornish clay. The Trevisker Ware examples from Kent, Brittany, and Northern France were made from gabbroic fabric.

Trevisker Ware vessels may have been made using the flattened coil technique. Pots were built entirely by hand, with no evidence for the use of the potter's wheel during this period, and pots were constructed by individual potters rather than in standardized workshops. Working gabbroic clay required considerable preparation. Gabbroic clay would first have been dried, then crushed to break down larger fragments and non-plastic material would have been removed. After rehydration, larger coarse inclusions would have been removed by hand. Most inclusions found in finished Trevisker vessels are under 2 mm in size, except in the largest vessels, indicating the deliberate removal of gravel. The production of a fine clay would have been a requirement for vessels intended to be decorated with cord impressions. Gabbroic clay would have been homogenized by weathering or puddling, where clay is stored as a thick slurry or moist lump for two to three months. Evidence for puddled clay has been found at Gwithian and Boden Fogou. Once formed and decorated, Trevisker pottery was dried then fired in open or slightly structured environments.

== Archaeological contexts ==
In the Early Bronze Age, Trevisker Ware is predominantly found in funerary or ceremonial contexts, especially in association with cremation burials.These vessels were occasionally accompanied by metal grave goods. From the Middle Bronze Age onwards, after c. 1500 BCE, Trevisker Ware is found on settlement sites, including Trevisker Round, Trethellan Farm, Gwithian, Kynance Gate, and sites on Dartmoor.

== Cultural significance ==
The prevalence of Trevisker Ware during the Early and Middle Bronze Age has been interpreted as evidence of a distinct cultural identity in south-west Britain. Wickenden argues that Trevisker pottery expressed a distinct technological identity based on local knowledge and social practice. Selecting gabbroic clay from the Lizard may have demonstrated membership within a local ceramic tradition, perhaps conveying group affiliation.

== See also ==
- Bell Beaker culture
- Cornish Bronze Age
- Grooved ware

== Bibliography ==
- ApSimon, A. M. (1972). "The Excavation of Bronze Age and Iron Age Settlements at Trevisker, St. Eval, Cornwall". Proceedings of the Prehistoric Society. 38: 302–381. doi:10.1017/S0079497X00012160. ISSN 0079-497X. S2CID 131146273.
- Cooper, Anwen; Garrow, Duncan; Gibson, Catriona; Giles, Melanie; Wilkin, Neil (2022). Grave goods: objects and death in later prehistoric Britain. Oxford; Philadelphia: Oxbow Books. ISBN 978-1-78925-747-2.
- Garrow, Duncan; Sturt, Fraser (2017). Neolithic stepping stones: excavation and survey within the western seaways of Britain, 2008-2014. Oxford: Oxbow Books. ISBN 978-1-78570-347-8.
- Gibson, Alex (1997). "A Cornish vessel from farthest Kent". Antiquity. 71 (272): 438–441. doi:10.1017/S0003598X00085045. ISSN 0003-598X.
- Gossip, James; Jones, Andy (2008). "A Bronze Age roundhouse at Carnon Gate, Feock". Cornish Archaeology. 47: 101–115.
- Harris, Susanna; Jones, Andy (2017). "Beautiful things: textiles and fibre artefacts from an Early Bronze Age cremation, Whitehorse Hill, England". In Bravermanová, Milena (ed.). Archaeological textiles - links between past and present: NESAT XIII. Verlag Beier & Beran Archäologische Fachliteratur. ISBN 9783957411181.
- Hughes, Simon; Farnell, Alex (1990). "Excavations at Tolgarrick Farm, Truro, Cornwall". Cornish Archaeology. 55: 1–63.
- Hunter, John; Ralston, Ian, eds. (1999). The archaeology of Britain: an introduction from the Upper Palaeolithic to the Industrial Revolution. London; New York: Routledge. ISBN 978-0-415-13587-0.
- Jones, Andy (1998). "The excavation of a Later Bronze Age Structure at Callestick". Cornish Archaeology. 37–38: 5–55.
- Owoc, Mary Ann (2000). Aspects of ceremonial burial in the Bronze Age of south-west Britain (Thesis).
- Parker-Pearson, Michael (1990). "The Production and Distribution of Bronze Age Pottery in South-Western Britain". Cornish Archaeology. 29: 5–32.
- Pearce, Susan (2011). Recent Archaeological Work in South-Western Britain: Papers in Honour of Henrietta Quinnell. BAR Publishing. doi:10.30861/9781407308845. ISBN 978-1-4073-0884-5.
- Quinnell, Henrietta (2012). "Trevisker Pottery: some recent studies". Cambrian Archaeological Association Monographs. doi:10.5284/1091075.
- Smith, George; Macphail, R.I.; Mays, S.A.; Nowakowski, J.; Rose, P.; Scaife, R.G.; Sharpe, A.; Tomalin, D.J.; Williams, D.F. (1996). "Archaeology and Environment of a Bronze Age Cairn and Prehistoric and Romano-British Field System at Chysauster, Gulval, near Penzance, Cornwall". Proceedings of the Prehistoric Society. 62: 167–219. doi:10.1017/S0079497X00002784. ISSN 0079-497X.
- Wickenden, Angie (2022). "Revealing the technological identity of the Cornish Bronze Age pottery". In Mărgărit, Monica; Boroneanţ, Adina (eds.). Recreating artefacts and ancient skills: from experiment to interpretation. Targovişte: Cetatea de Scaun. ISBN 978-606-537-565-9.
