= Scarcewater =

Hamlet in Cornwall, United Kingdom

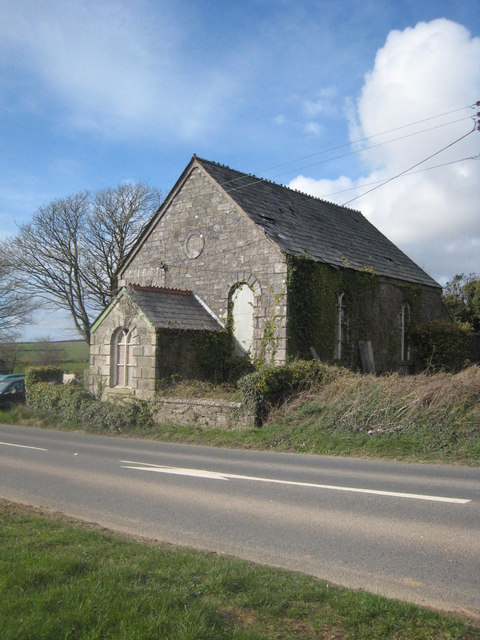
Disused Methodist chapel at Scarcewater

Scarcewater is a hamlet west-northwest of St Stephen-in-Brannel in mid Cornwall, England, United Kingdom.
