= Trelan =

Hamlet in Cornwall, England

Coordinates: 50°01′29″N 5°08′41″W

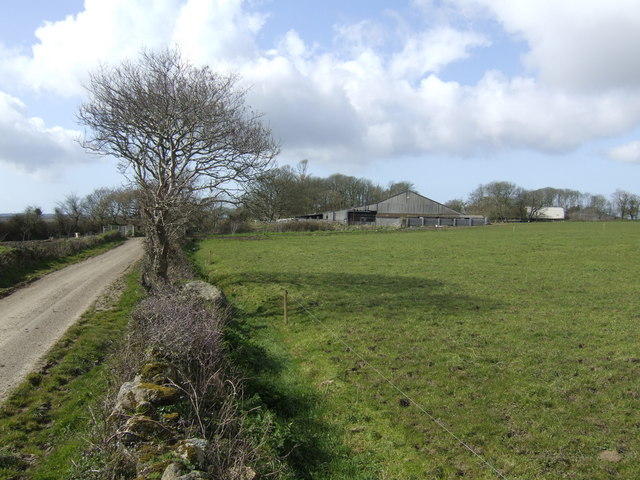
Barn at Lower Trelan

Trelan (Cornish: Trelann) is a hamlet in the parish of St Keverne in Cornwall, England, United Kingdom, on the eastern borders of Goonhilly Downs.

Trelan lies within the Cornwall Area of Outstanding Natural Beauty (AONB).

The manor of Trelan was recorded in the Domesday Book (1086) when it was held by Thurstan from Robert, Count of Mortain. There was 1 hide of land and land for 5 ploughs. There were 3 ploughs, 4 serfs, 2 villeins, 6 smallholders, 6 square leagues of pasture, 2 cattle and 40 sheep. The value of the manor was £1-5s. though it had formerly been worth £1-19s. There was also a land holding of 4 acres in Trelan which was held by Doda from the Count; there were 15 sheep and 1 cow.
