= William O'Brien (archaeologist) =

Irish archaeologist

William O'Brien MRIA
- Born: Cork, Ireland
- Known for: The archaeology of bronze metallurgy, Landscape archaeology

Academic background
- Education: B.A. – University College Cork (UCC); Ph.D. – University College Cork (UCC); D.Litt. - National University of Ireland
- Thesis: Primitive copper mining in south-west Ireland

Academic work
- Discipline: archaeologist

William O'Brien MRIA is an Irish archaeologist well known for his research on the evolution of Bronze Age societies and the appearance of metallurgy in Ireland. O'Brien is emeritus professor/chair of archaeology at University College Cork and an elected member of the Royal Irish Academy.

== Biography ==
O'Brien completed doctoral research at the University College Cork in 1987 on the emergence of prehistoric copper mining. He lectured for 16 years in the Department of Archaeology, NUI Galway. Research interests include the Chalcolithic and Bronze Age in Ireland, early mining and metallurgy in Atlantic Europe, upland archaeology, hillforts and all aspects of monumentality in the later prehistoric period. He has a particular focus on south-west Ireland as a region in prehistory, where he has conducted numerous research excavations.

== Selected publications ==
- O'Brien, William; O'Driscoll, James (2017). Hillforts, Warfare and Society in Bronze Age Ireland. Archeopress. p. 538. ISBN 9781784916558.
- O'Brien, William (2012). Iverni: a Prehistory of Cork. Collins Press. p. 285. ISBN 9781848891494.
- O'Brien, William (2004). Ross Island. Mining, Metal and Society in Early Ireland. Galway University Press. p. 768. ISBN 9780953562039.
