= Folklore of Spain =

Folklore of the Spanish people

Folklore of Spain encompasses the folklore, folktales, oral traditions, and (urban) legends of Spain. They span the whole region of the Iberian Peninsula. The origins of these tales date back as far as the 8th century when the Arabs brought their ideas and concepts of national fairytales (Cuento) and folklore to Spain.

The Arabian impacts on Spanish folklore would lead to Spain playing a mediator position between the European regions and the Muslim world and culture. Not only would Spain play this crucial role in the Muslim world, but they would also incorporate Indian cultural aspects into their tales and oral traditions.

== Regional differences ==
In the different regions of Spain, there are different iterations of the existing folklore. There are also their own unique pieces of folklore to the individual regions themselves.

In Basque country, they believe in the mythical being known as the Basajaun who is "The Lord of the Woods". He is depicted to be seen as a huge, hairy humanoid figure that protects the forest.

In Asturias and Cantabrian regions, they believe in what is known as the Culebre, which is a giant, winged serpent-dragon that is an inhabitant of caves and guards the treasures found inside them.

In the southern part of the Iberian Peninsula, the people believe in the tale of Tartessos and the story that originates from the epic poem, Las Abidas. Tartessos was a Bronze Age civilization that was known to have greatly prospered in its time, but mysteriously vanished about 2,500 years ago. This civilization was ruled by King Gargoris and eventually the leadership would be passed down to his son, Abido. His son would be the first to unite the country of Spain as a whole, but the history of this would be lost to time when Abido passed without an heir. His passing would also lead to the new divide of Spain into regions throughout the Iberian Peninsula.

== Folktales ==
Within Spain's folktales and folklore, there is a consistency in the stories told through tradition. In the thirteenth century, a text known as the Apolonio existed. It has been lost to time, and little is known about it, but there also exists a Castilian version from the late fourteenth century of the Spanish narrative. From current understandings and research findings, the tale of Antiochus exists in both of these formats.

The tale of Antiochus, the king of Antioch, a widower. He seeks out an inappropriate sexual relationship with his daughter and rapes her. Eventually their relationship does become one that is consensual, but extremely incestuous. In both versions of this tale, the daughter remains unnamed. In a mission to keep his daughter forever his, Antiochus proclaims that any possible suitor for her must decipher his riddle to wed his daughter. Each suitor that does not emerge from the riddle victorious, faces the fate of death, especially since Antiochus dictates the answers as incorrect even if they are a mildly acceptable response. Eventually a suitor by the name of Apollonius, who will solve the riddle but Antiochus will deem his answer incorrect, and grant him 30 more days to discover the true answer. Instead of facing Antiochus, Apollonius will travel away, either out of shame or in fear, and end up shipwrecked. He will be rescued by an African princess whom he will wed an have his children with. At the end of the tale, he will return to Antioch after the death of Antiochus and his daughter. Apollonius will then take the throne as the king of Antioch.

- The Bird of Truth
- The Knights of the Fish
- The Sprig of Rosemary
- The Vain Little Mouse
- The Water of Life
- The Wounded Lion

== Legends ==
- Legend of la Encantada
- Santa Compaña
- Santo André de Teixido

== Legendary figure ==
- Don Juan – In the legend of Don Juan, he is characterized to be an individual who has repeatedly seduced women into sexual encounters, or in other retellings, sexually assaults these women while promising his hand in marriage, that of which he never gives. Due to his actions, one of his victim's father comes to take revenge and justice for his daughter, and results in his unfortunate death. But, this father will then haunt Don Juan as a ghost and in one way or another, drag him straight to hell. This specific tale is also commonly evolved into theatrical plays.

== Riddlers ==
There are individuals known as "Riddlers" who are individuals that tell riddles, that of which are a transfer of power from the poser of the riddle, to the responder of the riddle. It is quite common in Spanish folklore for riddlers to be feminine over masculine because it creates a sexual tension between the female character who either poses the question, or answers it, and this confrontation of power. This choice is specifically made in the tales to display to the inhabitants of Spain a female heroine, who stereotypically starts off as powerless, but finds strength and power in her wit/wisdom by posing or answering a riddle.
