= Petrifaction in mythology and fiction =

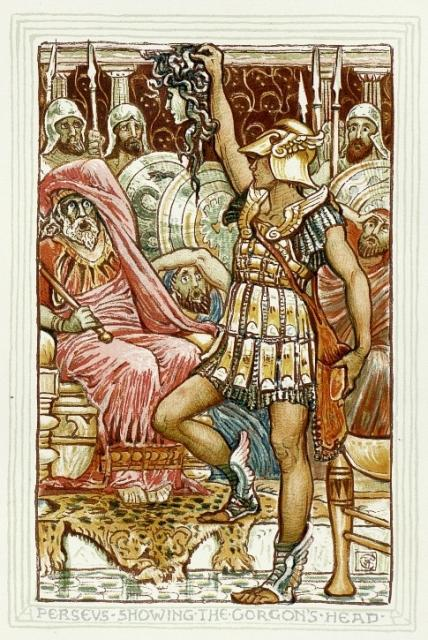
Perseus turning King Polydectes to stone with the head of Medusa.

Petrifaction, or petrification, defined as turning people into solid stone, is a common theme in folklore and mythology, as well as in some works of modern literature. Amos Brown noted that "Fossils are to be found all over the world, a clear evidence to human beings from earliest times that living beings can indeed turn into stone (...) Previous to the modern scientific accounts of how fossils are formed, the idea of magicians or gods turning living creatures into stone seemed completely plausible in terms of these cultures".

== Historical ==
Petrifaction is associated with the legends of Medusa and the Svartálfar among others. In fairy tales, characters who fail in a quest may be turned to stone until they are rescued by the successful hero, as in the tales such as The Giant Who Had No Heart in His Body, The Water of Life and The Dancing Water, the Singing Apple, and the Speaking Bird, as well as many troll tales.

In Cornish folklore, petrifaction stories are used to explain the origin of prehistoric megalithic monuments such as stone circles and monoliths, including The Merry Maidens stone circle, The Nine Maidens of Boskednan, the Tregeseal Dancing Stones, and The Hurlers. The supposedly petrified Cardiff Giant was one of the most famous hoaxes in United States history.

=== Europe ===
==== Ancient Europe ====
- Stheno, Euryale, and Medusa were Gorgons, three monstrous sisters with living venomous snakes for hair and the power to petrify anyone who met their gazes. Of the three Gorgon sisters, Medusa was mortal. Perseus killed Medusa by beheading her, and afterwards used her severed head as a weapon to petrify various enemies.
- In Homer's Odyssey, it is recounted that the god Poseidon turned a ship of the Phaeacians into stone, in punishment for their having helped his foe Odysseus: "With one blow from the flat of his hand, he turned her [the ship] into stone and rooted her to the sea bottom". In Classical times, the small island of Pontikonisi, off Corcyra (Corfu) was identified as this petrified ship.
- According to some authors, Heracles, when fighting the Nemean lion was helped in this labour by an Earth-born serpent, which followed him to Thebes and settled down in Aulis. It was later identified as the water snake which devoured the sparrows and was turned into stone in the prophecy about the Trojan War.
- Iodame was the daughter of Itonus and granddaughter of Amphictyon. She was a priestess at the temple of Athena Itonia built by her father. One night, Athena appeared in front of her; at the sight of Medusa's head which was worked in the goddess' garment, Iodame turned into stone. Since then, a priestess lit the fire on the altar every day, repeating thrice: "Iodame lives and demands fire".
- Lethaea is a mythological character briefly mentioned in Ovid's Metamorphoses. Due to her vanity, she was turned into stone at Ida by the gods. Her lover Olenus wished to share in the blame, and so shared her fate.
- Battus was a figure in Greek mythology who witnessed Hermes stealing Apollo's cattle. He agreed to keep the affair secret, but when Hermes returned in disguise to test him, he broke his word and was punished by being turned into stone.
- Metamorphoses by Ovid tell the story of Minerva and Aglauros. When Mercury comes to seduce mortal virgin Herse, her sister Aglauros is driven by her greed to help him. Minerva discovers this and is furious with Aglauros. She seeks the assistance of Envy, who fills Aglauros with so much envy for the good fortune of others that she turns to stone. Mercury fails to seduce Herse.
- The magical Teumessian fox, sent by the gods to punish the Greeks, could not be caught; Amphitryon set on the fox the magical dog Laelaps, who was destined to catch everything it chased. Zeus, faced with an inevitable contradiction due to the paradoxical nature of their mutually excluding abilities, turned the two beasts into stone. The pair were cast into the stars and remain as Canis Major (Laelaps) and Canis Minor (Teumessian Fox).

==== Post-Classical Europe ====
- In the Catholic hagiography of Saint Barbara, it is recounted that when the Saint was pursued by her sword-wielding father Dioscorus, after he learned of his daughter's acceptance of the new faith, her location was given away by a shepherd. The shepherd was punished for this deed by being turned into stone, while his flock were turned into locusts. A famous artistic depiction of the shepherd's petrifaction is included in the Altarpiece of Saint Barbara, a painting by Gonçal Peris conserved at the National Art Museum of Catalonia.
- At the village of Klobuky in the Czech Republic there is an alleged prehistoric menhir, with height of 3.3 m (11 ft) the tallest in the Czech Republic. It is an upright, lonely standing stone, called Zkamenělý pastýř ("Shepherd turned-into-stone") or Kamenný muž ("Stone Man").
- In another Czech village, Družec, there is a sandstone Marian column from 1674 and a man-sized stone called Zkamenělec ("Man-turned-into-stone"), surrounded with legends of a punished perjurer or blasphemer.
- At the village of Nowa Słupia in Poland there is the so-called Stone Pilgrim (Kamienny pielgrzym), a stone figure of a kneeling man, located near main entrance to the National Park. According to a legend, the figure once was a vain knight, who went on a pilgrimage to the abbey. Upon hearing the sound of the bells, he stated that they tolled in his honor, for which he was punished and turned into stone. The figure moves towards the summit at a pace of one grain of sand a year, and it will reach the top at the end of the world.
- The Lincoln Imp is a grotesque on a wall inside Lincoln Cathedral, England, and it has become the symbol of the city of Lincoln. A legend tells of it being a creature sent to the cathedral by Satan, only to be turned into stone by an angel.
- The Christian saint Hild or Hilda (614–680) was credited with having miraculously turned snakes into stone. The ammonite fossils found in large numbers at Sandsend Ness were considered as such. The coat of arms of nearby Whitby actually include three such 'snakestones'.
- The Merry Maidens, a late neolithic stone circle located 2 miles (3 km) to the south of the village of St Buryan, in Cornwall, United Kingdom, are considered by local myth to be nineteen maidens who were turned into stone as punishment for dancing on a Sunday. (Dans Maen translates as Stone Dance.) The Pipers two megaliths some distance north-east of the circle, are said to be the petrified remains of the musicians who played for the dancers. A more detailed story explains why the Pipers are so far from the Maidens – apparently the two pipers heard the church clock in St Buryan strike midnight, realised they were breaking the Sabbath, and started to run up the hill away from the maidens who carried on dancing without accompaniment. Such petrifaction legends are often associated with stone circles, as is reflected in the folk names of some of the nearby sites, for example, the Tregeseal Dancing Stones, the Nine Maidens of Boskednan, as well as the more distant Hurlers and Pipers on Bodmin Moor.
- An Icelandic legend about the island of Drangey says that two night-prowling giants, a man and a woman, were traversing the fjord with their cow when they were surprised by the bright rays of daybreak. As a result of exposure to daylight, all three were turned into stone. Drangey represents the cow and Kerling (supposedly the female giant, the name means "Old Hag") is to the south of it. Karl (the male giant) was to the north of the island, but he disappeared long ago.
- The Hítardalur valley in Iceland is supposedly named after the ogre Hít who, as the legend has it, was traveling there along with half-human turned ogre Bárður Snæfellsás. The pair were late returning to their lair in the mountains and failed to reach it before the first rays of daylight, and consequently turned into stone, a pair of very specific rock formations still found to be in their place close to the farmhouses on the estate.
- The mountain of Ontria, looming over the area of Tsotyli in present-day Greece, is known for its forests, fresh water springs and old legends about girls who turned into stone.
- The local legend about Mitchell's Fold, a Bronze Age stone circle in Shropshire, England tells of a giant whose marvellous cow gave unlimited amounts of milk used the circle until a malicious witch milked the cow, using a sieve until it was drained dry, as a result of which it fled to Warwickshire where it became the Dun cow. As a punishment, the witch was turned into stone and surrounded by other stones to prevent her escaping. What became of the giant is unknown.
- A legend told at Carnac states that the Carnac stones were once pagan soldiers who were turned into stone by Pope Cornelius (Bishop of Rome 251–253) who was fleeing from them. (The historical Pope Cornelius was eventually martyred, on that occasion not making use of his supposed magic power).
- In Gabrielle-Suzanne de Villeneuve's fairy tale Beauty and the Beast, lifting an evil fairy's curse that turned the Prince into a Beast involved him finding true love and he and his mother, who witnessed the transformation, keeping the spell a secret or it would become permanent. A good fairy then petrified the castle's servants to prevent knowledge of the curse from getting out, only bringing them back to life after Beauty broke the spell.

=== Asia ===
- The Trưng Sisters are Vietnamese national heroines who led a rebellion against Chinese rule. According to one legendary account, when finally overwhelmed by Han China's armies, the sisters threw themselves into the Hat Giang River in order to avoid capture. They then turned into statues. These were eventually washed ashore and placed in Hanoi's Hai Ba Trung Temple for worship.
- Ōtomo no Satehiko (大伴挾手彦) was a Japanese general who twice led forces against the Korean kingdom of Goguryeo, first in 537 CE (some sources claim 536) and later in 562. A legend regarding his first campaign tells of how his wife, Matsura Sayohime, climbed to the hills above Hizen and prayed with such intensity for his safe return that she was turned into stone.
- Singhasan Battisi is a collection of Indian folk tales. The title literally means "thirty-two (tales) of the throne". In the frame story, the 11th-century king Bhoja discovers the throne of the legendary ancient king Vikramaditya (also known as Bikramjit). The throne has 32 statues, who are actually apsaras that had been turned into stone due to a curse. Each of the apsaras tells Bhoja a story about the life and adventures of Vikramaditya, in order to convince him that he is not deserving of Vikramaditya's throne.
- The legend connected to the Ermita de San Nicolas de Tolentino in the Philippines relates that the Pasig River was inhabited by ferocious caiman, crocodiles which traverse the length of the river to and from Laguna de Bay. A Chinese merchant who refused to be converted to the Christian faith while passing in front of the monastery of Guadalupe was almost caught by the devil disguised as a caiman to devour and bring to hell. Yet despite his being Pagan called to the saint venerated in the monastery, calling loudly, "San Nicolasi, San Nicolasi" and in uttering this prayer, the crocodile marvelously turned into stone and left the merchant safely. Due to this miracle, the Chinese merchant converted to the Christian faith and in thanksgiving erected an ermita near the petrified caiman.
- Malin Kundang is a folk tale originated from Indonesia, with similar versions spread around other regions in South East Asia. The story was about a poor sailor who became rich, own trading galleons and married a princess through hard works. However, when he came back to his village, he was ashamed to his poor mother and disowned her. The mother cursed him to become a stone as punishment.

=== The Americas ===
- Hunzahúa was the first zaque, ruler of the northern Muisca in present-day Colombia. He was said to have fallen in love with his sister Noncetá and made her his wife. His mother Faravita disagreed with the marriage of her two children and attacked the couple, spilling a bowl of chicha. This created the Hunzahúa Well. When Hunzahúa saw what his mother had done, and the Muisca protesting against his incest, he damned Hunza and the surrounding valley. Noncetá gave birth to a son in Susa, but the young boy turned into a rock. The sad couple traveled further, to the Tequendama Falls. Here, they changed into two rocks at either side of the sacred waterfall.
- Standing Indian Mountain in North Carolina, known in the Cherokee as Yunwitsule-nunyi, which translates to "where the man stood." is according to Cherokee mythology home to the remains of a Cherokee warrior. This warrior had been sent to the mountaintop to keep a lookout for a winged monster. The monster, who lair was located on Standing Mountain, would swoop in from the skies and steal children. Upon discovering the location of the monster's lair, the Cherokee prayed to the Great Spirit for assistance. The prayers were answered when the Great Spirit destroyed the monster and its lair with thunder and lightning. The lightning frightened the warrior and the warrior tried to abandon his post. Because the warrior abandoned his post, he was turned into stone for his cowardice.
- Fort Victoria (British Columbia) was erected in 1843 on a site originally called Camosun (a variant of the Lekwungen word "Camossung", the name of a girl turned into stone by the spiritual being Hayls, the Transformer to watch over the resources in what is now known as the Gorge waterway.)
- A legend about the origin of the name of Cap-Chat, Quebec in Canada relates to a cat ("chat" in French) who walked along the shore, killed and ate various animals, whereupon the "cat fairy" accused him of having eaten her offspring. For his punishment, the cat was turned into stone forever.
- The term Apache tears comes from a legend of the Apache tribe: about 75 Apaches and the US Cavalry fought on a mountain overlooking what is now Superior, Arizona in the 1870s. Facing defeat, the outnumbered Apache warriors rode their horses off the mountain to their deaths rather than be killed. The wives and families of the warriors cried when they heard of the tragedy; their tears turned into stone upon hitting the ground.

=== Oceania ===
- In Māori tradition, Āraiteuru is the canoe which brought the ancestors of the Ngāi Tahu people of the South Island. The fishing net and the water gourd (calabash) of Āraiteuru were turned into stone at Moeraki in the South Island, where they can still be seen.
- The Aboriginal legend of the Three Sisters, a rock formation in Australia, is about three sisters from the Blue Mountains who fell in love with three men from the neighbouring Dharruk tribe, but the marriage was forbidden by tribal law. Their brothers were not happy to accept this law and so decided to capture the three sisters. A major tribal battle followed and the sisters were turned to stone by an elder to protect them, but he was killed in the fighting and no one else could turn them back.

== Modern fiction ==
Petrifaction is a key element of the biology of several major characters in the animated series Gargoyles; the titular gargoyles are all demonic-looking warriors at night, but when the sun rises, they turn to stone until sunset, with a key challenge of their existences being finding a place to 'sleep' during the day where they will not be shattered by any enemies.

Petrifaction through magic is used as a weapon by characters in the novels The Lion, the Witch and the Wardrobe and The Patchwork Girl of Oz (Dr. Pipt's Liquid of Petrifaction). Witches in the television series The Vampire Diaries and its spin-off The Originals can use magic called desiccation to place vampires in a petrified state. Folkloric uses of petrifaction were introduced in the first edition of the Dungeons & Dragons tabletop role-playing game, which inspired later use in many video games such as King's Quest: Mask of Eternity, The Legend of Zelda: The Minish Cap, The Legend of Zelda: Phantom Hourglass.

In the novel Harry Potter and the Chamber of Secrets (1998), a giant snake known as a Basilisk is able to magically immobilise humans, animals and ghosts with its gaze. This immobilisation is referred to as "Petrification", although the victims are not turned to stone.

It is also featured in the novel Percy Jackson & the Olympians; the films The Snow Queen's Revenge and Willow, the manga and anime series Naruto (Senjutsu), Negima!, Witch Craft Works, Campione!, My-Otome, Seven Deadly Sins and Dr. Stone; in the TV series Seijuu Sentai Gingaman, Masters of the Universe (Snake Men), My Little Pony: Friendship Is Magic, Princess Gwenevere and the Jewel Riders (episode "Lady of the Lake"/"Lady of the Lake") and Friday the 13th: The Series (episode "A Friend to the End"); the video games Elite Beat Agents, Drakan: Order of the Flame, Pokémon (the move "Glare"), Pokémon Super Mystery Dungeon, and The Longest Journey (Roper Klacks), among many others.

Middle-earth trolls from J. R. R. Tolkien's universe can be turned to stone by direct sunlight, as depicted in folk tales. This vulnerability is also depicted in the Norwegian film Trollhunter, a fictional documentary that contains a "scientific" explanation for this.

In 2010, artist Mark Sheeky donated the 2008 painting "Two Roman Legionaries Discovering The God-King Albion Turned Into Stone" to the Grosvenor Museum collection.

In Mysticons, the process is called "turn to bone" which is a strong spell that was cast on Queen Goodfey and King Darius in the premiere of the show ("Sisters In Arms"), which was eventually undone months later by the caster himself at the end of the penultimate episode "Fear the Spectral Hand").

== Relationship with science ==
The fictional form of petrifaction has a qualitative (but not quantitative) relationship with real hypercalcemia, which is related to Vitamin D because of its significant role in calcium homeostasis and metabolism. Vitamin D is a group of fat-soluble secosteroids responsible for increasing intestinal absorption of calcium, magnesium, and phosphate, and multiple other biological effects. The major natural source of the vitamin is synthesis of cholecalciferol in the skin from cholesterol through a chemical reaction that is dependent on sun exposure. Published cases of toxicity involving hypercalcemia in which the vitamin D dose and the 25-hydroxy-vitamin D levels are known all involve an intake of ≥40,000 IU (1,000 μg) per day. However, this real effect cannot produce the fast and totally petrifying effects told by popular tales.

== See also ==
- Cultural depictions of Medusa and Gorgons
- Lot's wife, a woman in the Hebrew Bible who was transformed into a pillar of salt
- Stoneman disease, in which the body becomes ossified
