= Bodrifty =

Historic village in Cornwall, England

Coordinates: 50.1614°N 5.5764°W

Bodrifty: Cornish: Bodrighki
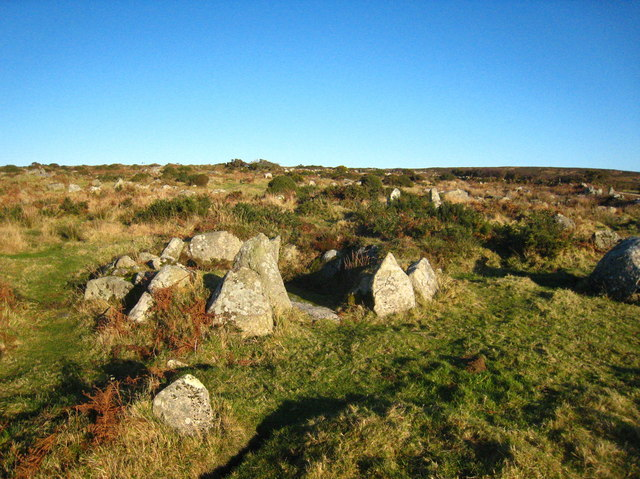

- Location within Cornwall
- Unitary authority: Cornwall
- Ceremonial county: Cornwall
- Region: South West
- Country: England
- Sovereign state: United Kingdom
- Police: Devon and Cornwall
- Fire: Cornwall
- Ambulance: South Western

Bodrifty (Cornish: Bodrighki, meaning dwelling of a royal dog) is the modern name of an Iron Age village, now in ruins, in Cornwall, England, United Kingdom. It is 700 yards west of Mulfra Hill in Penwith District, 3 miles northwest of Penzance and 1.5 miles southwest of Porthmeor, on the high ground of the watershed between the Atlantic and the English Channel. Today the settlement is barely more than a farm within the boundary of the village of New Mill, just north of Boskednan.

== History ==
Professor Tim Darvill dates Bodrifty as far back as the seventh century BC, but James Dyer has claimed that Bodrifty began as an open settlement in the fourth century BC.

During the Iron Age, Bodrifty was inhabited by peasants who lived in round huts and cultivated small fields in the area. The settlement thrived between the fifth and second centuries BC, and Pytheas, the Greek geographer and explorer, is said to have visited Bodrifty on his travels in the 320s BC.

== Archaeology ==
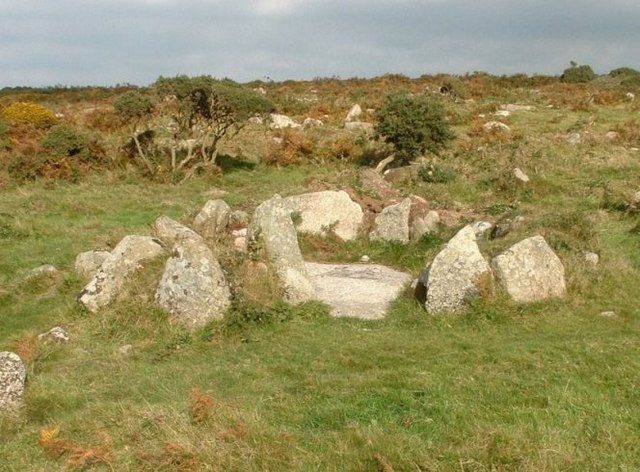
Hut circle at Bodrifty

The site is archaeologically significant in part because of the wide range of pottery shards discovered there. It was excavated extensively in the early 1950s and most of the finds are in the Royal Cornwall Museum, Truro. An analysis of the styles of pottery suggests that Bodrifty was inhabited from the fifth century BC to the first or second century AD. The settlement consisted of eight structures surrounded by a stone wall enclosing about three acres. The structures themselves had internal diameters of between three and eight metres. It is possible that the name means "the house by the summer shed" in Cornish.

=== Replica roundhouse ===
In 1999 Fred Mustill, a local smallholder, built a reconstruction of a roundhouse at Bodrifty Farm after receiving a small grant. The task of building the replica required the shifting of granite rocks weighing several tons, felling, shaping and lashing hundreds of feet of timber, and hundreds of hours' work cutting reeds for the roof. Mustill had previously researched typical roundhouse architectural structure and surveyed other reconstructions in Cornwall. Traditional rab (granite sub soil) was used for the mortar and woods such as oak, ash, holly and hazel for the roof. Mustill was keen for the house to be showcased as an educational aid for local children and others interested in history and archaeology, and hoped it would become a registered charity, though as of August 2011 it was being used for "luxury camping".

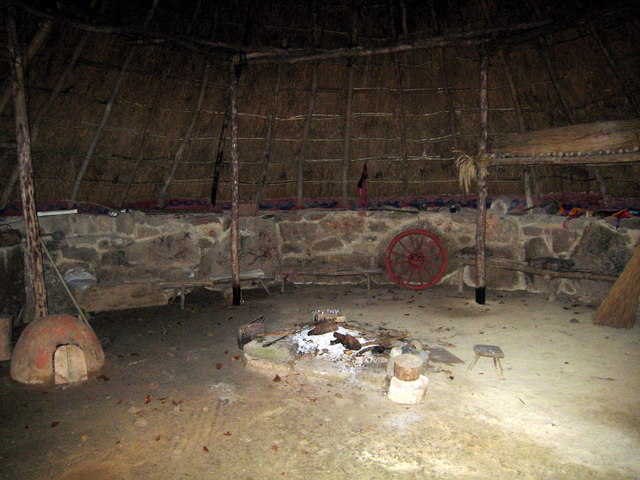
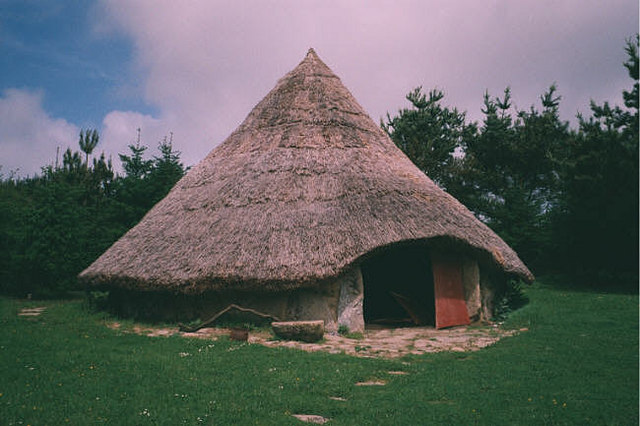
Reconstructed roundhouse
