= New Mill, Cornwall =

Hamlet in Cornwall, England

Coordinates: 50.151°N 5.560°W

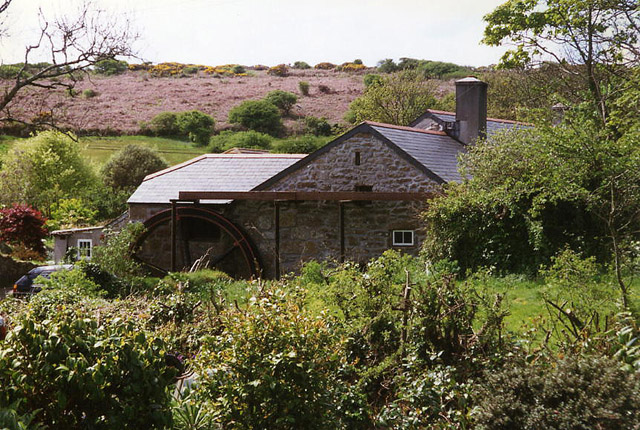
New Mill

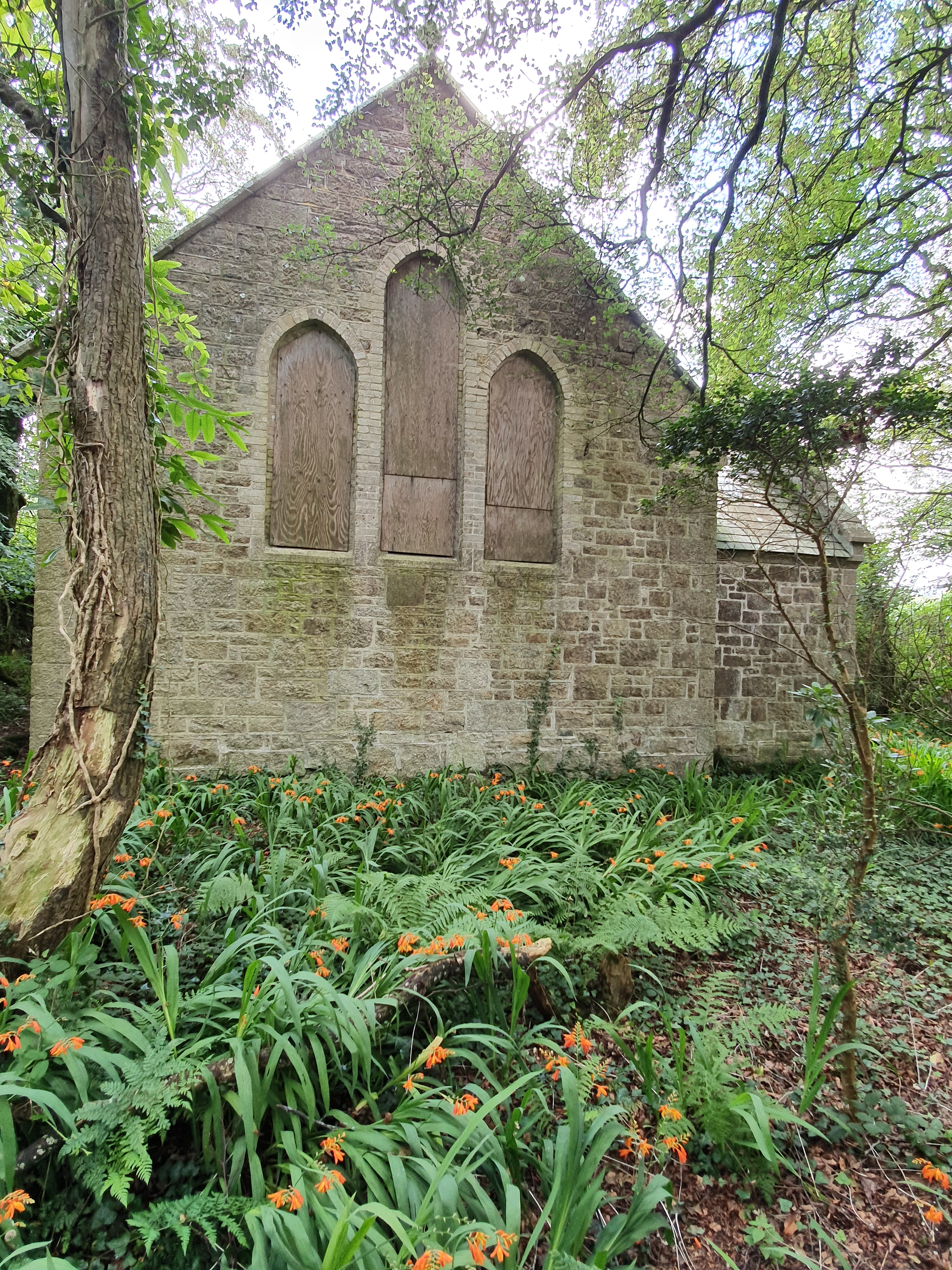
Mission Church of All Saints

New Mill (Newmill on Ordnance Survey maps) is a small settlement in west Cornwall, England. It is approximately 2 miles (3.2 km) north of Penzance on the road to Gurnard's Head.

== Geography ==
The area includes the hamlets of Boskednan and Bodrifty, which has a former Iron Age settlement. Nearby is Trythall School and the former mission church of All Saints which was designed by James Piers St Aubyn and opened in 1885, to service the mining community. It closed in 1957, the altar was moved to Gulval Church and placed in the Harris Chapel which was renamed the Trythall Chapel. New Mill lies within the Cornwall Area of Outstanding Natural Beauty (AONB).

== Industry ==
New Mill quarry (grid reference SW459392) closed before the First World War. During the 1880s it was owned by Messrs Freeman and Sons, employing fifteen men. Freeman's also owned the Lamorna and Sheffield quarries as well a yard at Wherrytown for processing the granite. They also employed hundreds of people in quarries near Penryn.

== Cornish wrestling ==
Cornish wrestling tournaments were held in meadow adjoining the Miners' Arms.
