= Boscawen-Un =

Bronze Age stone circle in Cornwall, England

Boscawen-Ûn stone circle
- Dons Meyn Bosskawen (Cornish)
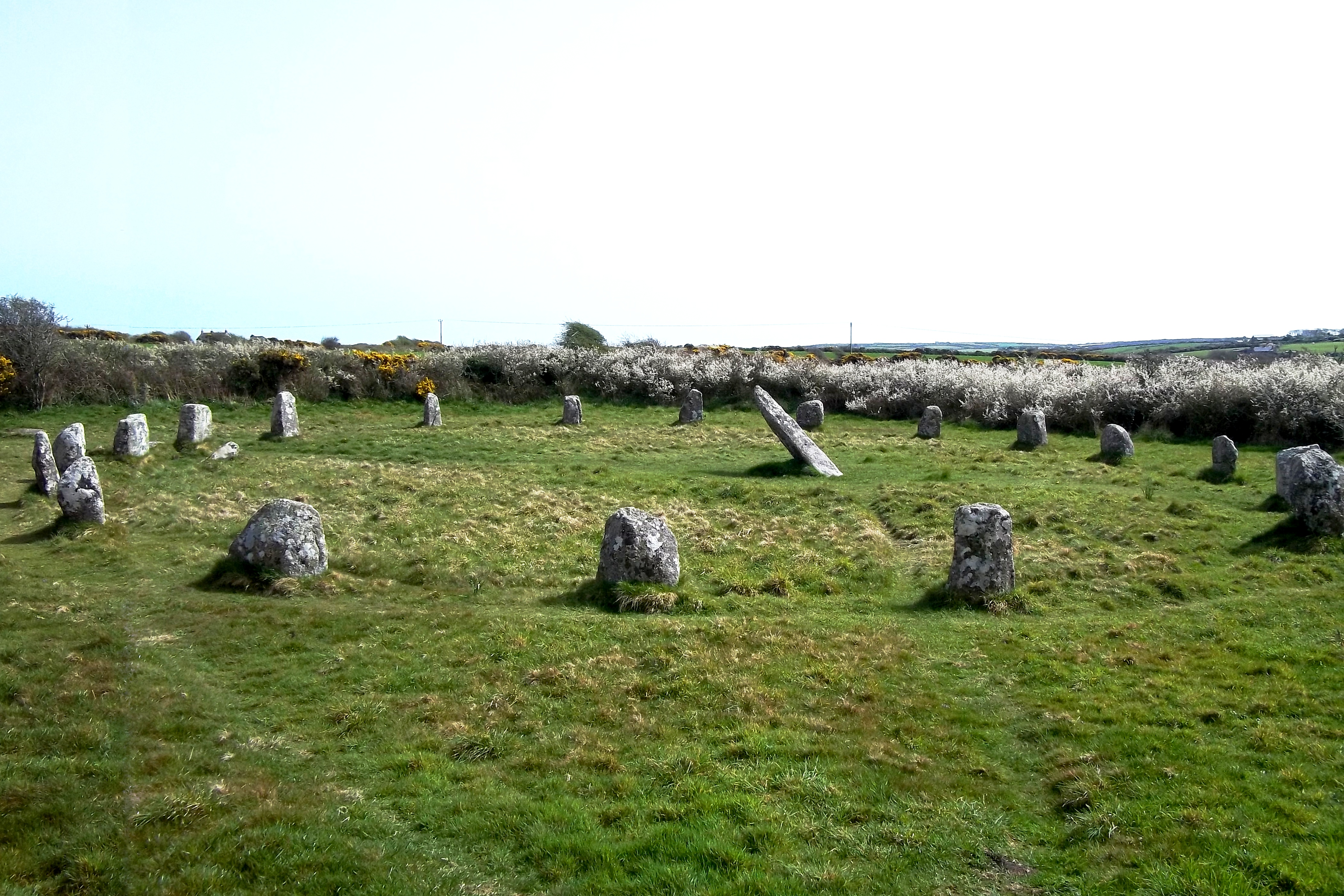
- The stone circle in 2011

- Location within Southwest Cornwall
- 50.08978°N 5.618847°W
- Type: Stone circle
- Periods: Neolithic / Bronze Age
- Location: Cornwall

Site notes
- Owner: CASPN

Boscawen-Ûn (Cornish: Dons Meyn Bosskawen) (grid reference SW412273) is a Bronze Age stone circle close to St Buryan in Cornwall, UK. It consists of nineteen upright stones in an ellipse with another, leaning, middle stone just south of the centre. There is a west-facing gap in the circle, which may have formed an entrance. The elliptical circle has diameters 24.9 and 21.9 metres (82 and 72 ft). It is located at grid reference SW412274.

The Gorsedh Kernow was inaugurated here in 1928. A Welsh triad mentions one of the three principal gorseddau of the Island of Britain as "Beisgawen yn Nyfnwal" (Boscawen in Dumnonia), which was taken to refer to Boscawen-Ûn by the Gorsedh's founders. The 18th-century Welsh antiquarian Iolo Morganwg compiled a collection of triads, which he claimed to have taken from his collection of manuscripts. Some of his triads are similar to those found in the medieval manuscripts, but some are unique to Morganwg, and are widely believed to have been of his own invention.

== Name and etymology ==
The stone circle takes its name from the nearby farm and locality known in Cornish as Boscawen-Ûn. The name derives from the Cornish language, historically spoken throughout Cornwall and now revived as a Celtic language.

The first element, bos, is a common Cornish place-name element meaning "farm", "dwelling", or "settlement", derived from the Brittonic word bod, meaning a habitation. The second element, scawen, comes from Cornish skawen, meaning "elder tree".

The final element, Ûn, derives from Cornish un, meaning "one" or "single". Taken together, the name is generally interpreted as meaning "the single farm by the elder trees" or "the dwelling by the elder trees". Because early spellings of the name vary, the precise grammatical sense of the final element remains uncertain.

A related form appears in Welsh bardic tradition as "Beisgawen yn Nyfnwal" ("Boscawen in Dumnonia"), recorded in a Welsh triad describing one of the three principal gorseddau of the Island of Britain. This form reflects a Welsh phonetic rendering of the Cornish place-name rather than a separate local name for the site.

Like many prehistoric monuments in Britain, the Bronze Age stone circle takes its name from the later farm and landscape in which it stands, rather than from a name dating to the time of its construction.

== Location ==
Boscawen-Un is in southwest Cornwall, in the Penwith district north of St Buryan, by the A30 road from Penzance to Land's End. Both the Merry Maidens stone circle and the two Pipers standing stones can be seen as can the sea.

== Construction ==
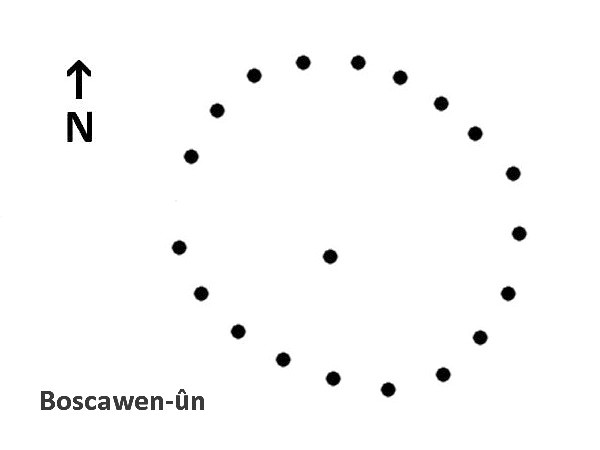
Map of the stones

The stone circle consists of a central standing stone encircled by 19 other stones, including 18 made of grey granite and one of bright quartz, which describe an ellipse with axes of 24.9 m and 21.9 m. The position of the quartz stone in the southwest may indicate the likely direction of the sun as it moves south after All Souls'. At the northeastern edge of the stone circle are two stones in the ground which it is possible had at one time been a burial cist. The large central stone has a feet or axe petroglyph. These engravings are unusual in the United Kingdom, though they can also be observed on some of the stones at Stonehenge. The rock art is only fully illuminated around the summer solstice sunrise, although there is partial illumination around the summer sunset. The circle has been aligned with the rising winter solstice sun from the Lamorna Gap.

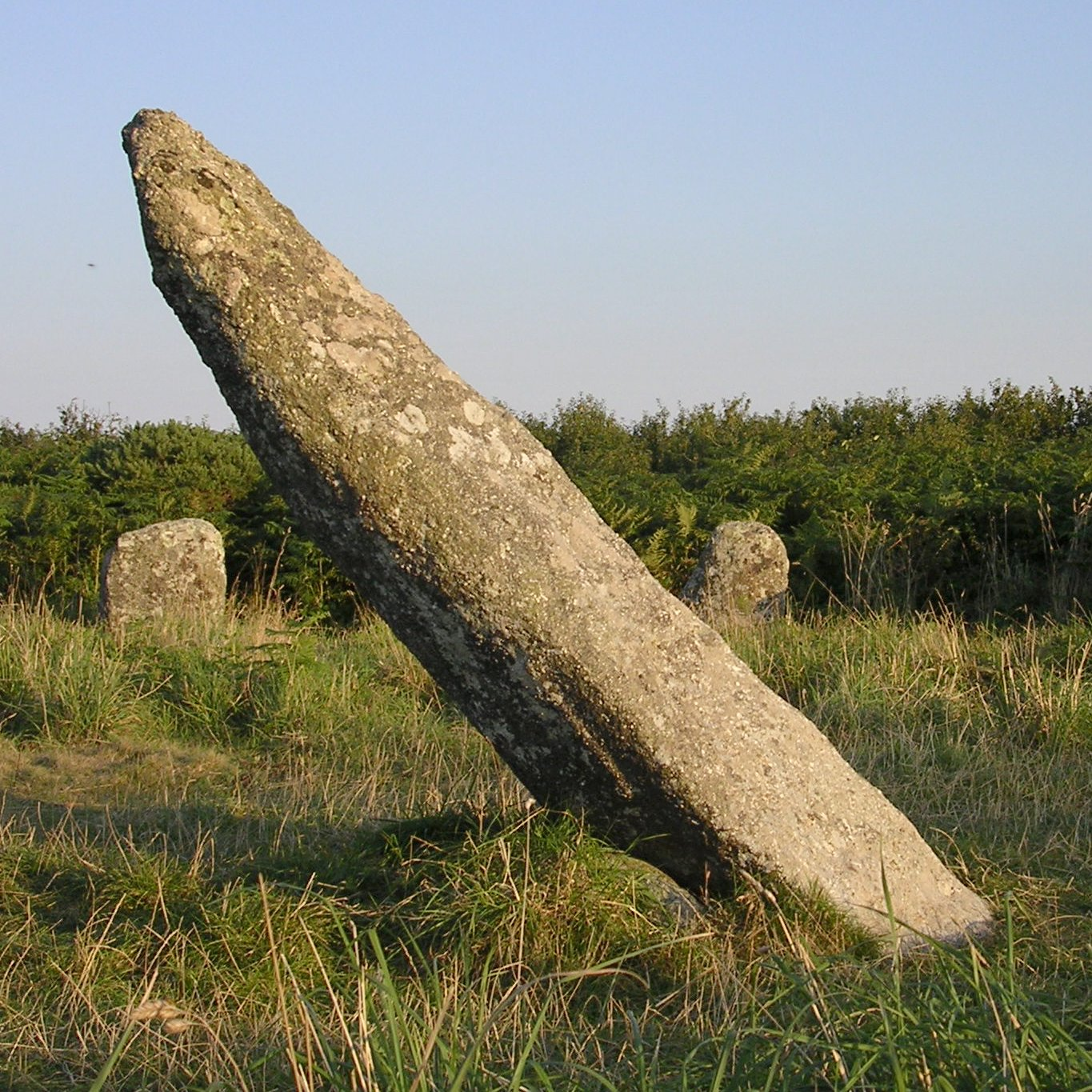
The central stone

There is a wide gap in the west of the circle, which suggests the loss of stones. However this gap may represent, as with the nearby Merry Maidens, an entrance. The central stone is 2.7 m long, but because of its strong inclination to the north-east, the tip is only 2.0 m above the ground. It is claimed by some researchers that the central stone embodies the phallic male principle and the quartz stone represents the female powers of the ring.

== History ==
The stone circle at Boscawen-Un was erected in the Bronze Age. A Bardic group (Cornish: Gorsedh) may have existed in this area, because in the Welsh Triads from the 6th century AD, a Gorsedd of Beisgawen of Dumnonia is named as one of the big three Gorsedds of Poetry of the Island of Britain. Dumnonia was a kingdom in post-Roman Britain, which probably included Cornwall. In 1928 at Boscawen-Un, in the course of the revival of the Cornish language and culture, Henry Jenner founded the Cornish Bard Association and called it the Gorsedh Kernow (Gorsedd of Cornwall).

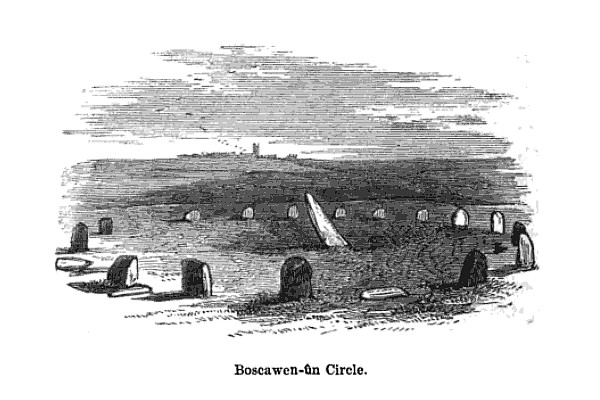
Illustration by John Thomas Blight (1864)

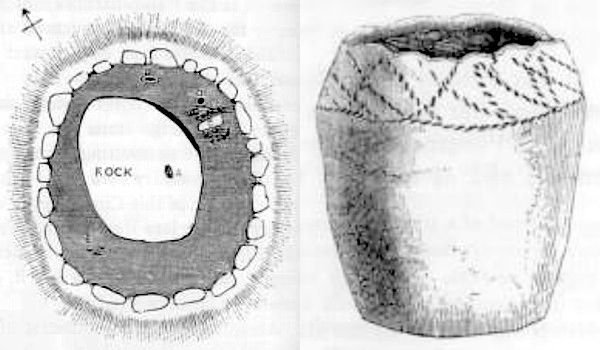
Plan of the burial mound and sketch of an urn (1864)

William Camden described the stone circle in his Britannia (ca. 1589) thus: "... in a place called Biscaw Woune are nineteen stones in a circle, twelve feet from each other, and in the circle stands one much larger than the rest." Camden does not mention the central stone leaning at an angle but in 1749 William Stukeley thought it may have been disturbed by someone looking for treasure. William Borlase mapped the circle in 1754 showing eighteen stones standing and one fallen, and at some time in the next hundred years a Cornish hedge was constructed through the circle. The hedge was first mentioned in 1850, by Richard Edmonds, and around 1862 the owner of the land, Miss Elizabeth Carne, had it removed and a new hedge built surrounding the stones. This is, thus, an early example of the preservation of an archaeological monument. In 1864 the area around the stone circle was first studied scientifically. The excavation reports show that the central stone already had its remarkable inclination. A burial mound was discovered near the stone circle, in which urns were located. From this time originates one of the first illustrations of the stone circle, which John Thomas Blight made, when he wrote a book concerning the churches of Cornwall with notes concerning ancient monuments. He also drew a plan of the burial mound and sketched one of the excavated urns.

== See also ==
The site was the setting for the 1978 Doctor Who story "The Stones of Blood", though the episodes were actually filmed at the Rollright Stones.

Other prehistoric stone circles in the former Penwith district

- The Merry Maidens
- Tregeseal East – also known as the Tregeseal Dancing Stones
- Boskednan – also known as the Nine Maidens of Boskednan
