= The Merry Maidens =

Late Neolithic stone circle in Cornwall, England

Merry Maidens
- Dons Meyn Rosmodres (Cornish)
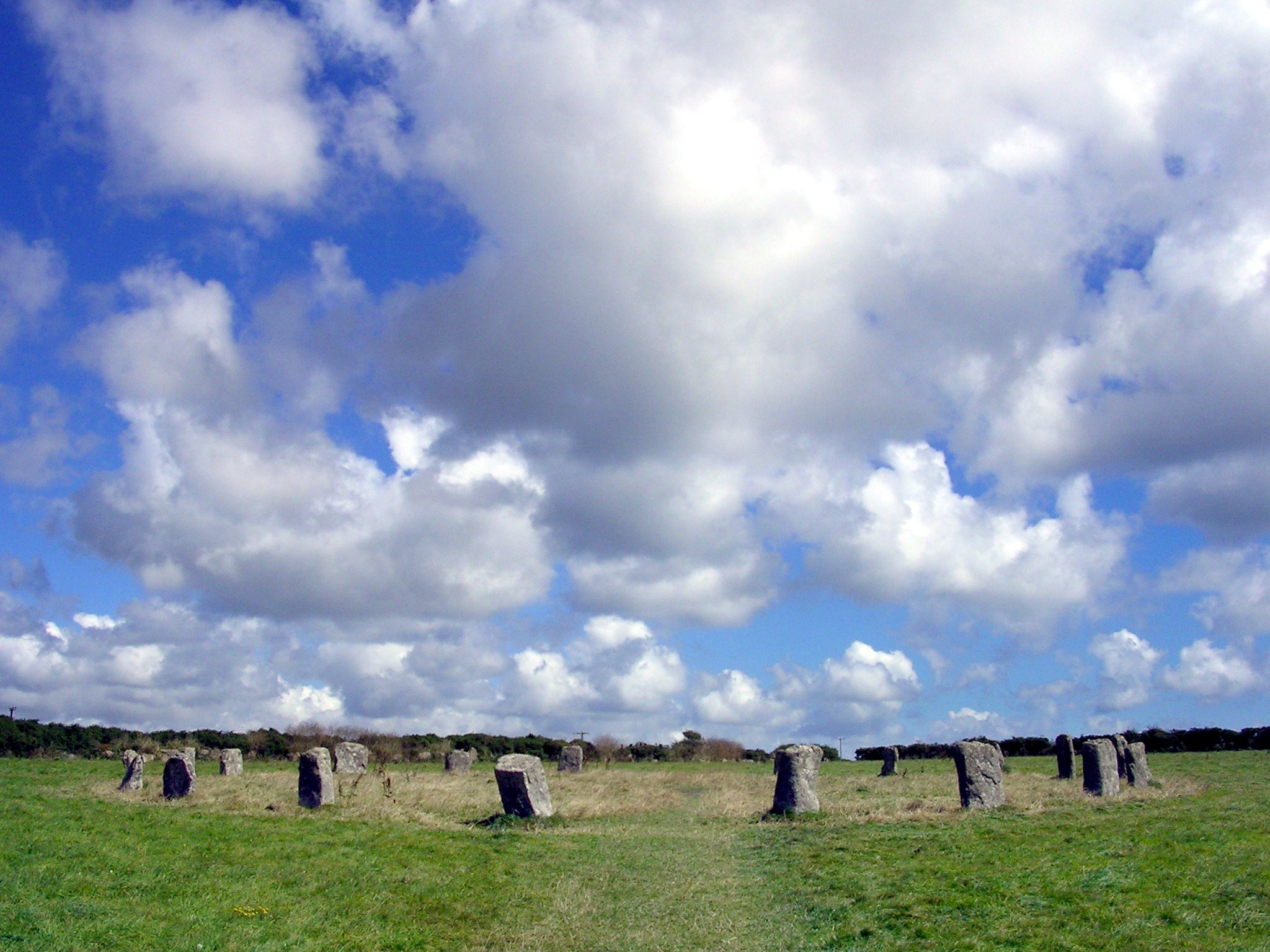
- The stone circle in 2005
- Interactive map of Merry Maidens
- 50°03′54″N 5°35′20″W
- Type: Stone circle
- Location: Penwith, Cornwall

History
- Built: c. 1500 BC

Site notes
- Material: Granite
- Height: c. 1.4 meters
- Diameter: c. 24 meters
- Owner: CASPN

The Merry Maidens (Cornish: Dons Meyn Rosmodres) (grid reference SW432245), also known as Dawn's Men (a likely corruption of the Cornish Dons Men "Stone Dance") is a Late Neolithic stone circle located 2 miles (3 km) to the south of the village of St Buryan, in Cornwall. A pair of standing stones, The Pipers is associated both geographically and in legend.

== Description ==
The circle, which is thought to be complete, comprises 19 granite megaliths and is situated in a field alongside the B3315 between Newlyn and Land's End. The stones are around 1.2 metres high, with the tallest standing 1.4 metres. They are spaced three to four metres apart with a larger gap between the stones on the east side. The circle is around 24 metres in diameter.

To the south is another stone which suggests a possible north–south orientation. In earlier times there was another stone circle located 200 metres away, but this had been destroyed by the end of the 19th century. 300 metres to the northeast are The Pipers – two 3-metre-high standing stones. These have been described as "largest surviving standing stones in Cornwall and probably the best known". The Tregiffian Burial Chamber is nearby.

== Myth and legend ==
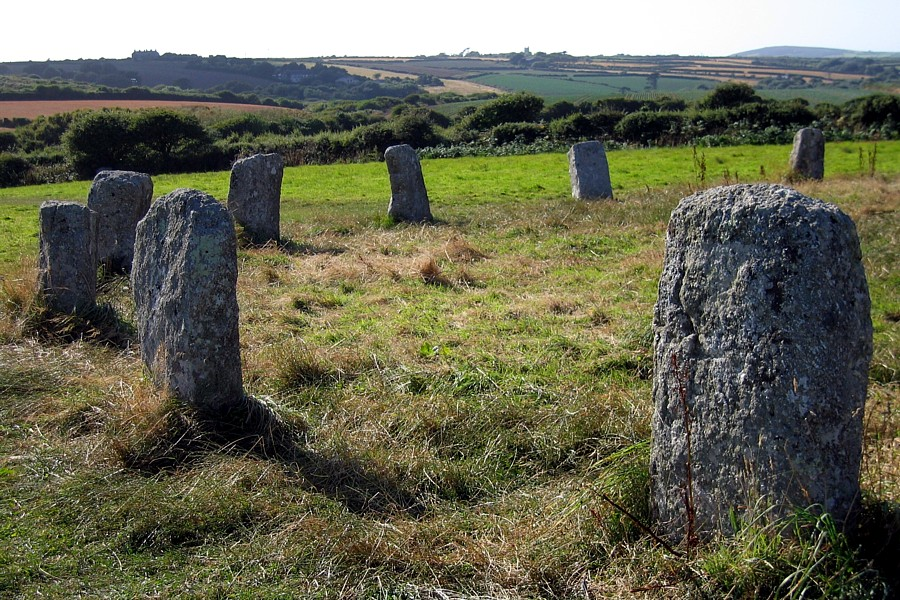
The Merry Maidens

The local myth about the creation of the stones suggests that nineteen maidens were turned into stone as punishment for dancing on a Sunday. (Dans Maen translates as Stone Dance.) The Pipers, two megaliths some distance north-east of the circle, are said to be the petrified remains of the musicians who played for the dancers. A more detailed story explains why the Pipers are so far from the Maidens – apparently the two pipers heard the church clock in St Buryan strike midnight, realised they were breaking the Sabbath, and started to run up the hill away from the maidens who carried on dancing without accompaniment. These petrification legends are often associated with stone circles, as is reflected in the folk names of some of the nearby sites, for example, the Tregeseal Dancing Stones, the Nine Maidens of Boskednan, as well as the more distant Hurlers and Pipers on Bodmin Moor. Another tradition says that The Pipers were erected to commemorate Howel and Æthelstan, leaders who died in a 10th-century battle.

== Research ==
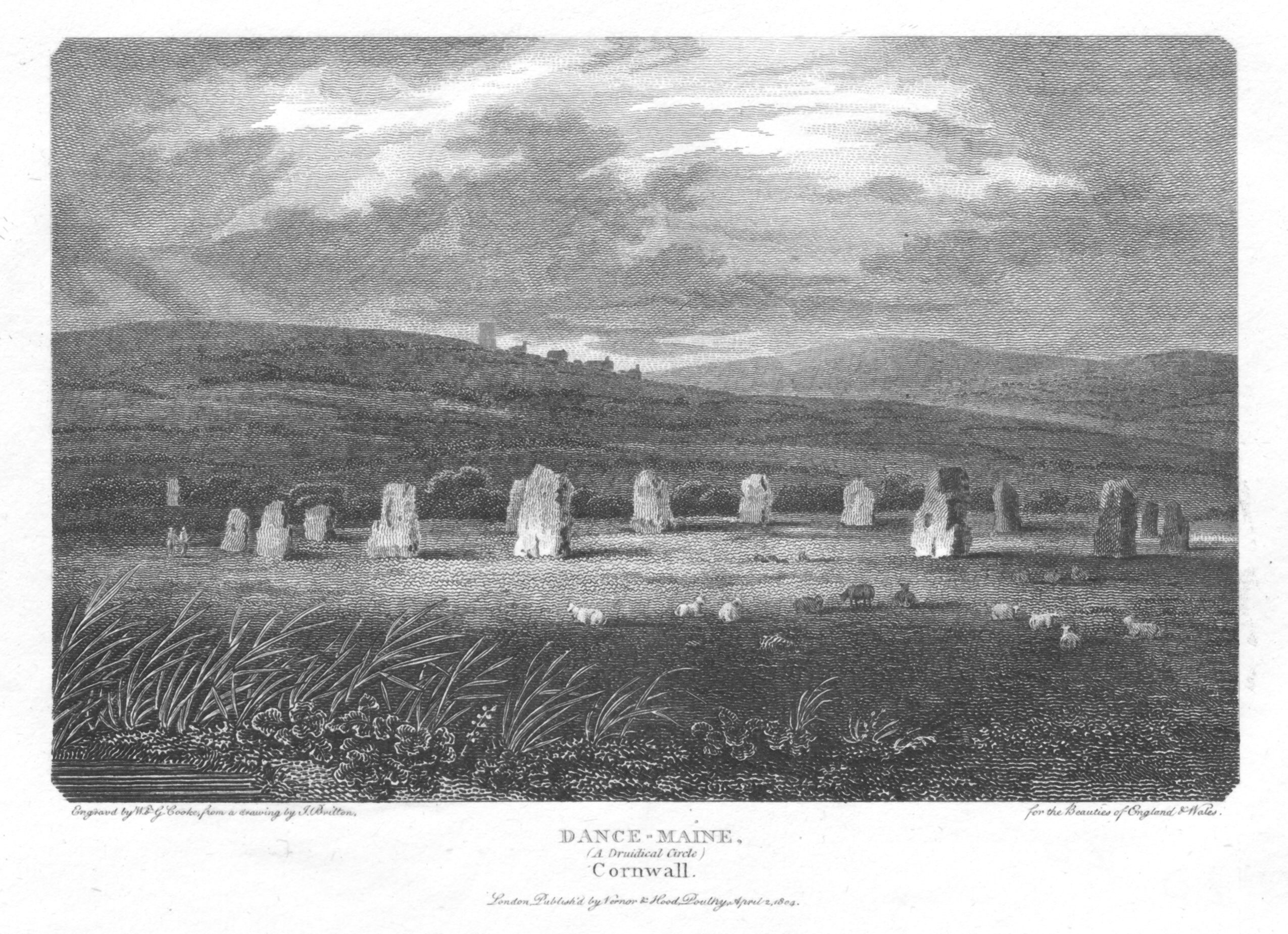
The Merry Maidens engraved by W. & G. Cooke, 1804

The Merry Maidens were first examined in detail by antiquarian William Borlase in 1769, who also reported a second equally large circle of stones. In 1872, William C. Borlase, a descendant of the elder Borlase, produced a more detailed description of the area. At that time, seven stones were still present from the second stone circle, before it disappeared by the end of the 19th century. Hugh Hencken wrote a first modern scientific view of the archaeological site in 1932.

A more recent study was produced by John Barnatt in 1982. Today it is thought that there were originally 18 standing stones. In the mid-19th century, new stones were added in an attempt at reconstruction, but not in the correct position or number. In addition, some of the old stones were moved, giving the appearance that the stone circle has today.

== See also ==
Other prehistoric stone circles in the Penwith district:

- Boscawen-Un
- Boskednan, also known as the Nine Maidens of Boskednan
- Tregeseal East, also known as the Tregeseal Dancing Stones
