= Battus (mythology) =

Greek mythological figure

Battus (Ancient Greek: Βάττος, lit. 'tongue-tied') was a figure in Greek mythology who witnessed Hermes stealing Apollo's cattle in Maenalus in Arcadia.

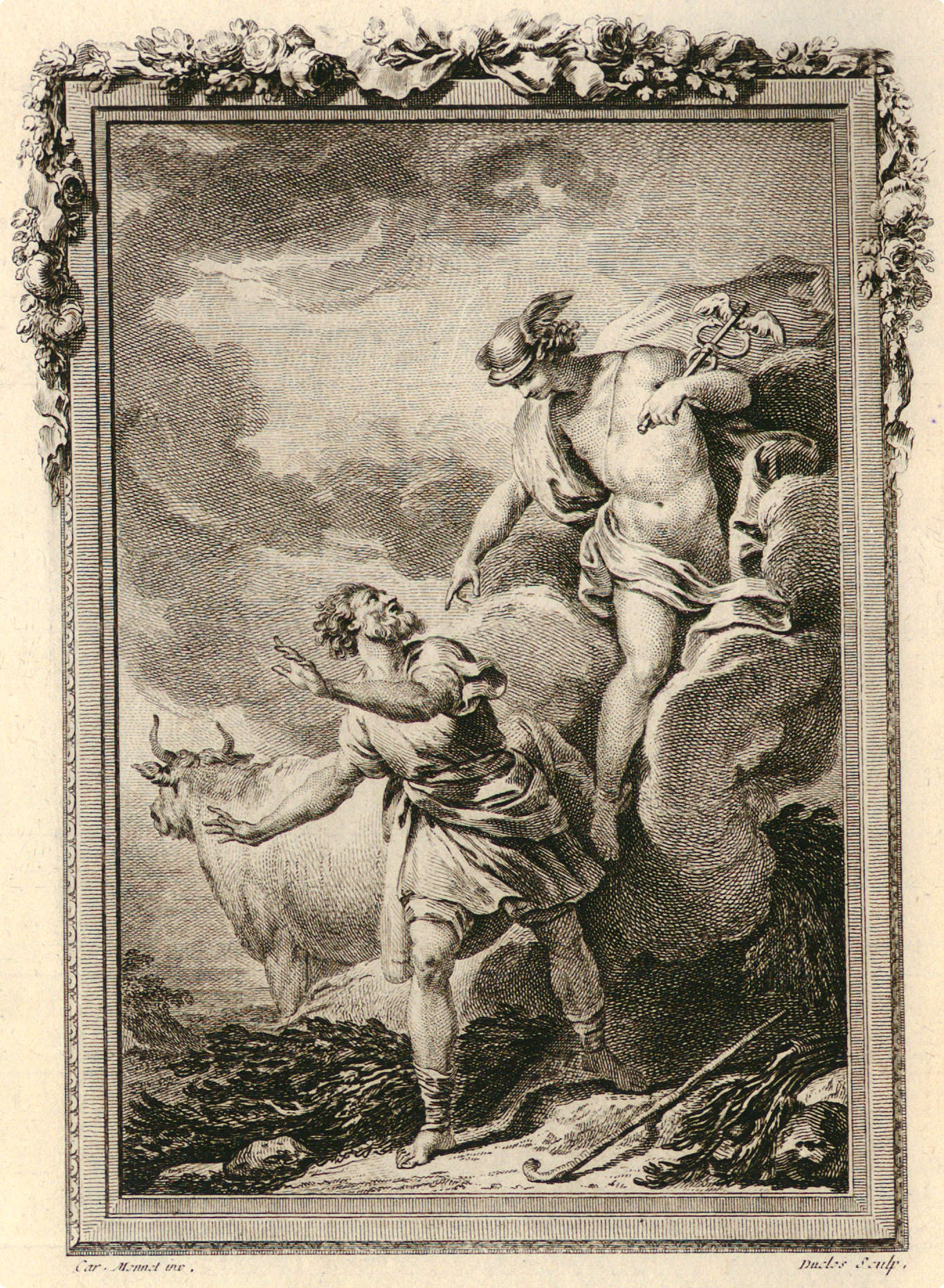
Hermes turns Butte to stone ." Engraving by Antoine - Jean Duclos of 1767 for Ovid 's Metamorphoses

Hermes gave him a heifer on condition Battus kept the theft secret. On returning in disguise, Hermes offered to reward Battus if he would tell him the location of the cattle; Battus did so, and for his greed was punished by being turned into stone.
