= Carn Kenidjack =

Hill in Cornwall, England

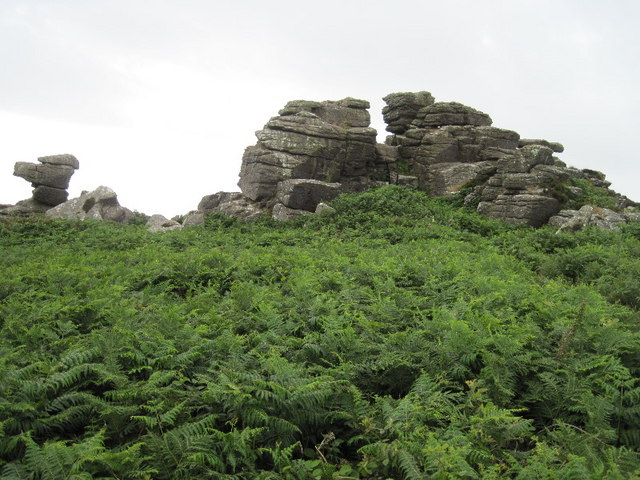
- Carn Kenidjack viewed from the north

Highest point
- Elevation: 202 m (663 ft)
- Coordinates: 50°08′21″N 5°39′25″W

Geography
- Location: Cornwall, United Kingdom
- OS grid: SW38783301

Carn Kenidjack (grid reference SW388329) is a hill in Tregeseal, Cornwall, UK. It is covered in megaliths including Tregeseal East stone circle.

A tale is told that two miners returning home one night witnessed a wrestling match near Carn Kenidjack, which was presided over by the Devil. When one of the demon wrestlers was wounded, they whispered a prayer in his ear, and the entire spectacle disappeared.

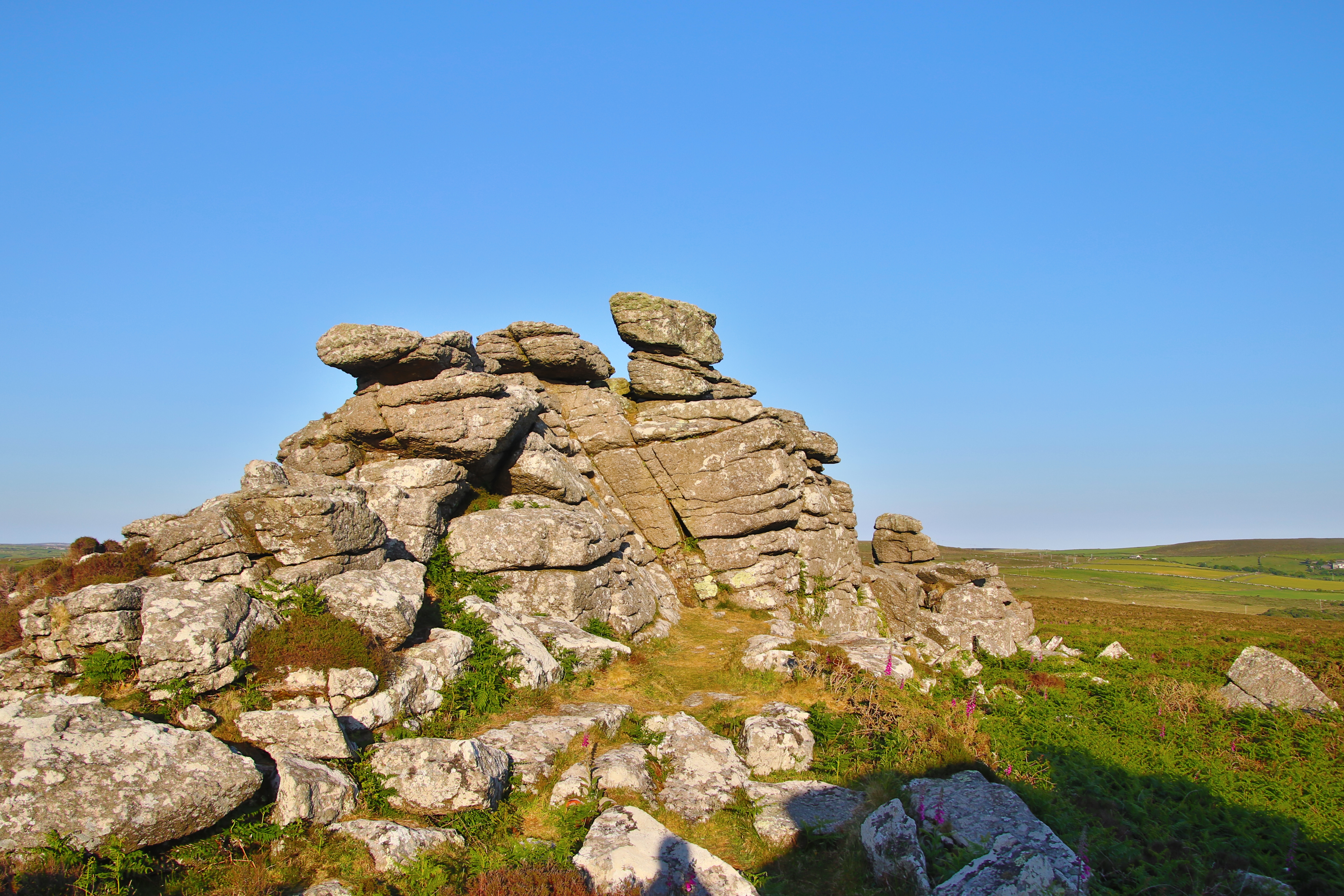
Carn Kenidjack Cornwall
