= The Bird of Truth =

Spanish fairy tale

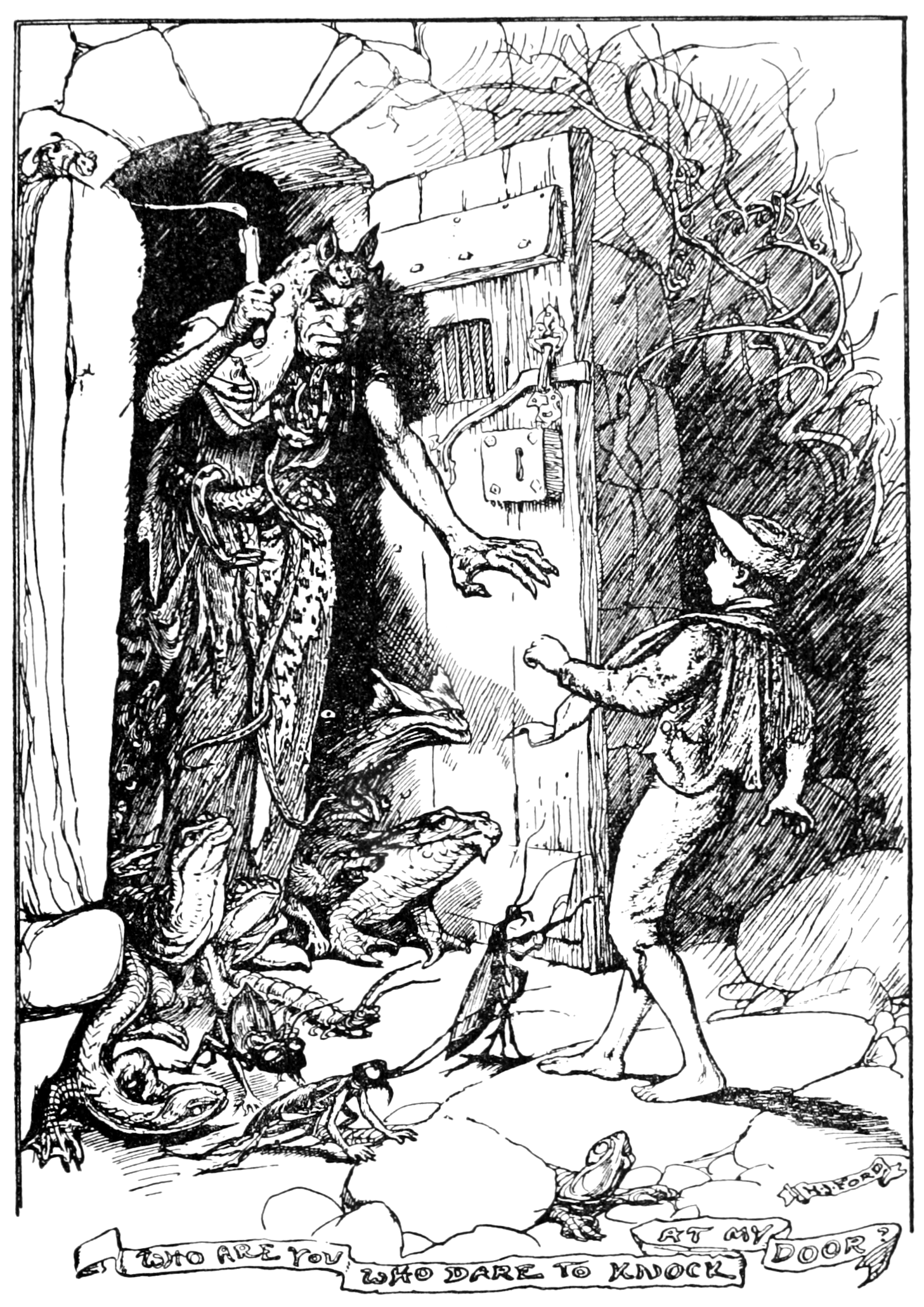
The boy meets a witch

The Bird of Truth (Spanish: El Pájaro de la Verdad) is a Spanish fairy tale collected by Cecilia Böhl de Faber in her Cuentos de encantamiento. Andrew Lang included it in The Orange Fairy Book.

It is related to the motif of the calumniated wife and classified in the international Aarne-Thompson-Uther Index as type ATU 707, "The Three Golden Children". These tales refer to stories where a girl promises a king she will bear a child or children with wonderful attributes, but her jealous relatives or the king's wives plot against the babies and their mother. Variants are widely collected from Iberian tradition, in the many languages of Spain.

== Synopsis ==
A fisherman found two beautiful children in a crystal cradle, a girl and a boy, floating in the river and brought them to his wife to raise as their own. As the babies grew up, their older brothers were cruel to them and the boy and the girl often ran away to the riverbank, where they would feed breadcrumbs to the birds. In gratitude, the birds taught them to speak their language.

One day the oldest boy taunted them with having no parents, and so the boy and girl went out into the world to seek their fortunes. When they stopped to rest along their journey, they heard birds gossiping, and one bird said that the king had married the youngest daughter of a tailor, over the opposition of the nobles. He was obliged to go to war, and when he returned, he was told that his wife had given birth to twins who had died. Missing her babies, the queen went mad, and had to be shut up in a tower in the mountains where the fresh air might restore her. In fact, the babies had not really died, but were taken to a gardener's cottage, and that night the chamberlain threw them into the river in a crystal cradle, which the children recognized from the story of how the fisherman had found them.

The bird went on to say that only the Bird of Truth could convince the king that the children were really his children, and the bird was kept by a giant who only slept a quarter-hour a day in the castle of Come-and-never-go. Only a witch could tell the way to the castle, and she would not do it unless she was given the water from the fountain of many colours. Furthermore, the Bird of Truth is surrounded by the Birds of ill Faith, and only an owl could tell which one was which.

They went to the city, where they begged hospitality for a night, and were so helpful that the innkeeper asked them to stay. The girl did, but her brother left on his quest. A dove directed him to go with the wind, and by following it, he reached the witch's tower and asked the way to the castle of Come-and-never-go. The witch tried to get him to stay the night, but when he refused, demanded a jug of the many-colored waters, or she would turn him into a lizard. She then directed a dog to lead him to the water.

At the castle, he heard the owl's cry and asked its advice. It told him to fill the jug from another fountain and then find the white bird in the corner, not the brightly colored birds. He had a quarter of an hour to do the task, and succeeded. When he brought back the water, the witch threw it over him and told him to become a parrot, but he became more handsome, and all the creatures about the hut threw themselves into the water and became human again. The witch fled.

The courtiers who were responsible for abandoning the children tried to prevent the King from learning about the children, but they talked so much of it that he overheard the commotion and became curious. When the bird flew to him, he listened. The King at once went to embrace his children, and then all three of them freed his wife, their mother, from the tower. The wicked courtiers had their heads cut off, and the couple who had raised them were given riches and honor.

== Analysis ==
=== Tale type ===
The tale is one of the many variants of Aarne–Thompson–Uther type ATU 707, "The Three Golden Children", a type widespread across all continents. According to scholarship, the tale type may also be known in Spain as El lucerito de oro en la frente ("The golden star on the forehead").

=== Distribution ===
American fairy tale researcher and Hispanist Ralph Steele Boggs (de) published in 1930 a structural analysis of the tale type in Spanish sources. According to him, a cursory glance at the material indicated that the tale type was "very popular in Spanish".

Modern sources, from the 20th century and early 21st century, confirm the wide area of distribution of tale type across Spain: in Catalonia, Asturias, Andalusia, Extremadura, New Castilla; Cuenca, Salamanca, Cáceres, and in Province of Ciudad Real. Scholar Montserrat Amores has published a catalogue of the variants of ATU 707 that can be found in Spanish sources (1997).

Researcher James M. Taggart commented that the tale type was one of "the most popular stories about brothers and sisters" told by tellers in Cáceres, Spain (apart from types AT 327, 450 and 451). Interpreting this data under a sociological lens, he remarked that the heroine's role in rescuing her brother reflects the expected feminine task of "maintaining family unity".

== Variants ==
=== Francisco Maspons y Labrós ===
In compilations from the 19th century, collector D. Francisco de S. Maspons y Labros compiled variants in Catalan: Los Fills del Rey ("The King's Children"), L'aygua de la vida ("The Water of Life"), Lo castell de irás y no hi veurás and Lo taronjer. Maspon y Labrós noted the resemblance between Lo castell de irás y no hi veurás and Lo taronjer to The Sisters Envious of Their Cadette, from The 1,001 Nights.

In Lo castell de irás y no hi veurás ("The Castle of Going and Not Returning"), a father makes a pact with the Devil in order to get rich, in exchange for one of his daughters. The Devil convinces the man to maim his daughter, but every time she blesses herself with the sign of the cross and the Devil fails. She then runs away from home and takes refuge in a cave, where she is found by a king. They marry. While the king is away at war, she gives birth to twins, a boy and a girl, and writes him a letter telling the good news, but the letter is intercepted by the Devil, who falsifies the contents to say that the queen gave birth to puppies. The king receives the letter and writes one back, which is also intercepted and falsified by the Devil with a command to cast the twins in the water. The false order is carried out and twins are cast in the water in a chest. The twins are saved by a miller and later are adopted by a chaplain who names the twins heirs to his grand fortune. The women of the chaplain's home village, envious of the twins' luck, send a witch to their house. The witch persuades them to seek the tree of leaves of every colour, the water of all colours, and the bird with plumage of every colour - that are to be found in the titular "Castle of Going and Not Returning".

In Lo taronger or Lo taronjer, three girls are talking, and one of them says her children will have a star on the front. The prince hears this and takes her to his castle to marry her. She gives birth to twin boys with a star on the front who are cast in the river, and a year later to a girl with a rose in each hand. They are saved by a gardener, who raises them. Years later, they leave home to look for their parents and find an old woman. The old woman tells them to go to the forest and pluck an orange from the orange tree in a deep forest. After the brothers fail, their sister is the one to pluck it, cracks it open and a many-coloured bird comes out of it.

=== Antoni Maria Alcover ===
According to Josep Antoni Grimalt Gomila, author Antoni Maria Alcover collected and published 7 Catalan rondalles (folktales) from Mallorca that can be classified as type 707: S'aygo ballant i es canariet parlant ("The dancing water and the talking canary"); Sa flor de jerical i s'aucellet d'or; La Reina Catalineta ("Queen Catalineta"); La bona reina i la mala cunyada ("The good queen and the evil sister-in-law"); S'aucellet de ses set llengos; S'abre de música, sa font d'or i s'aucell qui parla ("Tree of Music, the Fountains of Gold and the Bird that Talks").

=== Other collectors ===
Spanish folklorist Antonio Machado y Alvarez wrote down an Andalusian tale from his own sister, titled El agua amarilla ("The yellow water"). In this tale, three sisters talk about their choices for husbands: the elder wants to marry a baker so there is not shortage of bread for her; the middle one a cook, and the youngest the king. The king listens to their conversation and arranges their marriages. The elder sisters become jealous and conspires against their sister, the queen: after she gives birth to three children (two boys and a girl), each time they replace the baby for an animal and cast them in the water in a basket. However, the three children are saved by the "King's Sultan", who raises them. Years later, the siblings build a little house near the palace, and an old woman comes to visit them and tell about the yellow water, the bird that talks and the tree that sings.

Sérgio Hernandez de Soto collected a variant from Extremadura, named El papagayo blanco ("The white parrot"). In this tale, a count marries a poor, but beautiful woman. While he goes to war, he leaves his wife under the mayordomo's care, who is secretly in love with her. The count's wife gives birth to twins, each with a star on the front, and the mayordomo replaces the twins for two black children, places them in a crystal casket and casts them in the river. Years later, they are sent for a fountain of silver water, a branch of a tree with golden acorns and silver nuts, and a white parrot. The brother is petrified when he tries to catch the bird, and his sister saves him and other petrified people. At the end of the tale, the once petrified people are invited to the twins' house, where they show their baby blankets with the count's family crest emblazoned on them and the white parrot helps them discover the truth of their parentage.

Historian Juan Menéndez Pidal collected a version from the Asturias from informant Tomás Sanchez, from Pola de Laviana. In his tale, titled El pájaro que habla, el árbol que canta y el agua amarilla ("The bird that talks, the tree that sings and the yellow water"), an old king begs his son to find a wife. The prince rides a bit around town and rides in front of the house of a shoemaker, where his three daughters are talking: the elder wants to marry the king's son to order people around; the middle one so she can ride in a carriage and wear many dresses, and the youngest because she wants a good husband. The king'son chooses to marry the youngest sister. The elder sisters get jealous and replace their nephews (two boys and a girl) for animals, and each time cast them in a basket in the water. The children are saved each time by a rich gardener with no sons, who raises them as their own. Years later, an old witch visits their house and tells them about three objects that can grant them full happiness: the bird that talks, the tree that sings and the yellow fountain that flows gold.

Author Wentworth Webster translated into English a variant in Basque language, titled The singing tree, the bird which tells the truth, and the water that makes young. In thits tale, three sisters talk to each other while spinning: the first wants to marry the king's valet, the second the king's son-in-law and the third the king himself. The king overhears their conversation and marries them to their husbands of choice. The two sisters become increasingly jealous of the third one and plot against her. When the new queen gives birth to a girl and two boys (in three consecutive pregnancies), they replace them for a cat, a dog and a bear cub and abandon them in a basket elsewhere. A gardener finds the children each time and raises them. Years later, an old beggar woman telles them about three treasres which will make them happy: the tree which sings, the bird which tells the truth, and the water which makes young again. The brothers fail in the quest, but their sister gets the treasures and rescues them. At the end of the tale, the bird exposes the queen's sisters and reveals the truth to the king during a dinner.

In a tale collected from an informant in Algeciras with the title La historia del pájaro sabio, del agua saltarina y el árbol cantor ("The tale of the wise bird, the leaping water and the singing tree"), a humble peasant couple have four daughters. One day, they are visited by three men. The couple order their daughters to serve them food. Some time later, the king summons the four girls to the castle, since he and his ministers were the men they served. The king falls in love with the fourth girl and marries her, to the jealousy of the other sisters. The new queen gives birth to two boys and a girl in three consecutive pregnancies. They are replaced for puppies and cast in the water, but are saved by a poor couple. Years later, an old beggar man visits the siblings and tells them to seek the speaking bird, the dancing water and the singing tree.

Galician ethnographer Lois Carré Alvarellos published a tale collected from Campamento, in San Xurxo de Iñás, with the title As Fillas do Zapateiro ("The Shoemaker's Daughters"). In this tale, a shoemaker has three beautiful daughters, the third the kindest of them. One day, a hunter comes to their house and asks for some water to drink; only the third daughter heeds his request, to her sisters' refusal. Some time later, the prince appears to them, and they notice he was the hunter. He takes the third sister to his castle and marries her, to her sisters' jealousy. The princess gives birth to twins, a boy and a girl, which are taken by their aunts and cast in the river in a box. A miller rescues the box and raises the twins as his children. Years later, both leave home and find work with an old woman. One day, the old woman takes the twins to a feast at the king's castle, and the shoemaker's eldest daughter wishes to know them, so she can poison their food. Her crime is discovered and she is punished. The king, the prince's father, recognizes his grandchildren and takes them to the castle.

A variant in the Algherese dialect of the Catalan language, titled Lo pardal verd ("The Green Sparrow"), was collected in the 20th century.

== See also ==
- The Water of Life
- The Dragon of the North
