= The Water of Life (Spanish fairy tale) =

The Water of Life (L'aigua de vida) is a Catalan fairy tale collected by D. Francisco de S. Maspons y Labros (1840–1901), in Cuentos Populars Catalans (1885). Andrew Lang included it in The Pink Fairy Book (1897).

== Synopsis ==
Three brothers and a sister worked very hard, became rich, and built a palace. It was much admired, but an old woman told them it needed a church. They built a church. It was even more admired, but an old man told them it needed a pitcher of the water of life, a branch where the smell of the flowers gave eternal beauty, and the talking bird. The oldest brother decided to set out after it. They asked the old man how they could know he was safe, and the man gave them a knife: as long as it was bright, he was well, but when it was bloody, evil had happened to him.

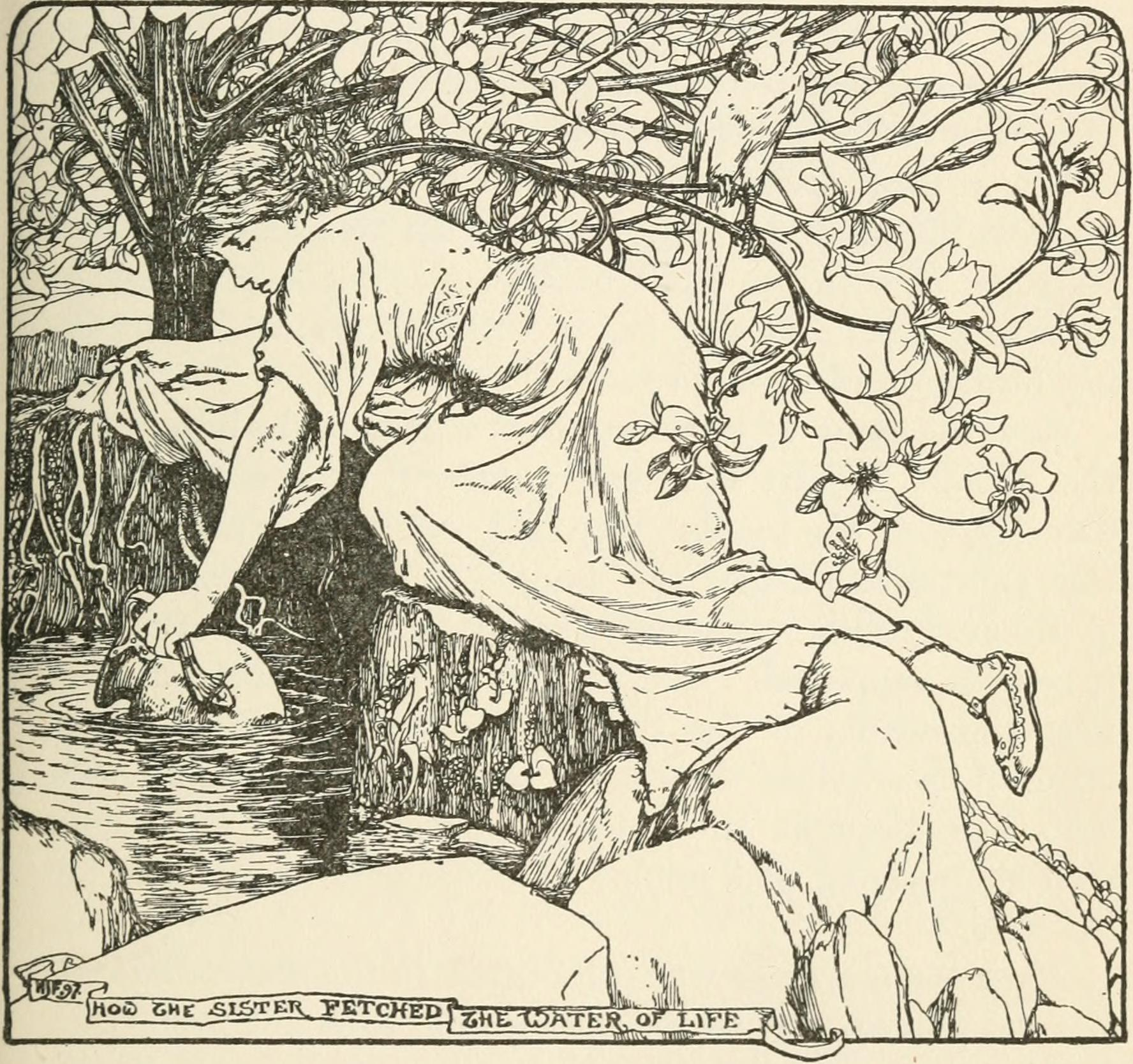
Illustration from The Pink Fairy Book

He met with a giant who told him he had to walk past stones that would mock him; if he did not turn, he could gain what he was after, but if he did, he would turn to stone as well. He went to the mountain, but the stones jeered at him, so loudly he turned to throw a rock at them, and turned to stone.

Warned by the knife that something had happened, his two brothers followed him, and suffered the same fate.

Their sister followed, but did not turn. At the top, she found a pool, and the bird perched on a branch of the tree. She took them all, but was tired, and let spill a few drops, which turned the people back to life. She sprinkled the water on all the stones and restored them all to life. At home, she planted the tree and watered it, and it grew, and the bird perched in its boughs.

A prince came to see the wonders, and married the sister in the church they had built.

== Analysis ==
The quest to find a branch, a magical water, and a talking bird is found also in The Dancing Water, the Singing Apple, and the Speaking Bird and Princess Belle-Etoile, and in some variants just the bird, as in The Three Little Birds and The Bird of Truth, but this fairy tale lacks the usual motive: the children are not sent after it by a jealous soul who is trying to hide that they are a king's children.

The tale is one of the many variants of Aarne–Thompson–Uther type ATU 707, listed and analysed across sources in Spanish academia.

A structural analysis of the ATU 707 tale type in Spanish sources has been published in 1930.

== Variants ==
Writer Elsie Spicer Eells published a similar tale, titled The White Parrot, in her book Tales of Enchantment from Spain. In this variant, a sister and a brother live together, but the sister, named Mariquita, is spurred by an old lady to send her brother for three fantastical objects: a fountain of silver water, a tree with silver leaves and nuts of gold, and a white parrot. At the end of the tale, after saving her brother, the sister regrets sending him on that dangerous quest for her whimsical demands.

== See also ==
- The Water of Life (German fairy tale)
