= The Wounded Lion =

Spanish fairy tale

The Wounded Lion is a Spanish fairy tale collected by D. Francisco de S. Maspons y Labros, in Cuentos Populars Catalans. Andrew Lang included it in The Pink Fairy Book.

== Synopsis ==
A poor girl got a job herding cows. One day, she heard a moan, and found a lion with a thorn in its paw. She pulled it out, and the lion thanked her by licking her hand, but she could not find the cows again. Her master beat her and set her to herding donkeys. A year later, she found the lion wounded again, and when she aided it, the donkeys vanished. Her master beat her again and set her to herding pigs. A year later, the lion appeared for a third time, wounded, she aided it, the pigs vanished, and she decided to wait and see if she could find them.

She climbed a tree and saw a man coming down a path and vanishing behind a rock at sunset. She decided to stay until she saw him come out. At dawn, a lion came out. She went down and behind the rock. A beautiful house stood there; she tidied it up and ate a meal before coming out to climb the same tree. The man came at the same time, and the next morning, the lion looked about before going on.

After three days of this, she could not discover his secret, so she descended and asked him. He told that he was enchanted by a giant into that form by day and was the lion she had helped; furthermore, the giant had stolen the cows, donkeys, and pigs in revenge for her aid. She wanted to free the man. He told her that the only way was to get a lock of hair from the king's daughter and make a cloak from it for the giant.

The girl got the princess to hire her as a scullion. She dressed very neatly every day, and it came to the ears of the princess, who set her to comb her hair. The girl begged a lock of hair from her until she gave it. The girl wove a coat from it, but it was too small. She went back to the princess, who gave her another lock on the condition that she would find her a prince to marry. The girl said she had already found him, took the lock, and made the coat larger. The giant asked her what reward she wanted. She wanted to turn the lion back into a man. After some argument, the giant told her to kill the lion, cut him up into pieces, burn them, and throw the ash into water. The prince would arise from it a man.

She went away weeping, afraid that the giant had lied and she would kill the prince. The prince comforted her and told her to do it, and it worked. He said he would marry her. The girl told him she had promised the princess that she had found her a bridegroom. They went back to the princess, and her parents, the king and queen, knew him for their own son. So he married the girl who had saved him.
