= The Sprig of Rosemary =

Spanish fairy tale

The Sprig of Rosemary (Catalan: Lo romaní) is a Catalan fairy tale from Spain collected by Dr. D. Francisco de S. Maspons y Labros in Cuentos Populars Catalans. Andrew Lang included it in The Pink Fairy Book.

It is related to the international cycle of Animal as Bridegroom or The Search for the Lost Husband, wherein a human maiden marries a man under an animal curse, loses him and has to search for him, and is classified as subtype ATU 425A, "The Animal (Monster) as Bridegroom".

== Synopsis ==
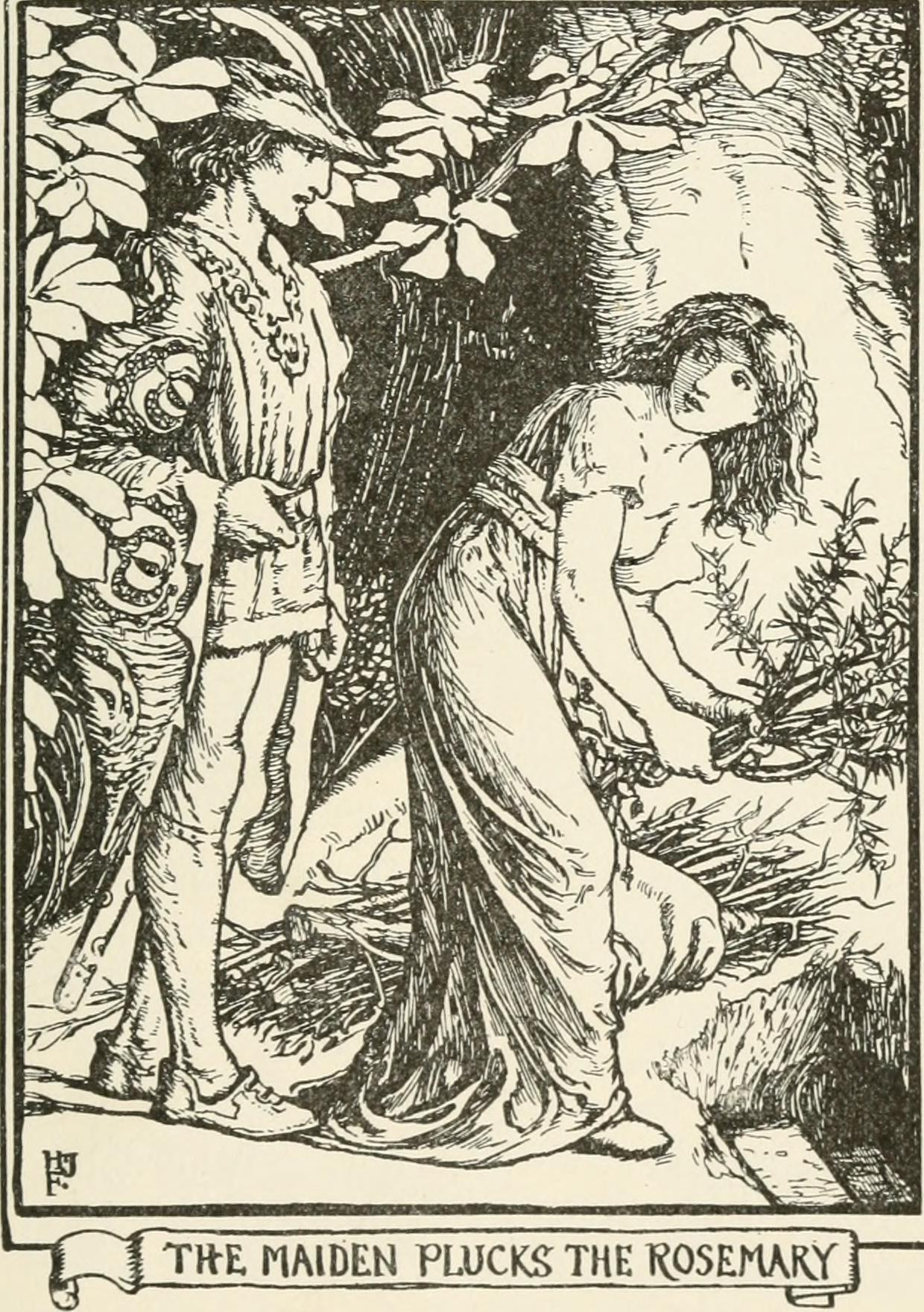
Illustration from The Pink Fairy Book

The fairy tale is about a man who makes his only daughter work very hard. One day after work, he sends her to collect firewood and so she does. While searching for the wood, she picks herself a sprig of rosemary as well. Then a handsome young man appears and asks why she has come to steal his firewood. She replies that her father sent her. The young man leads her to a castle and tells her that he is a great lord and wants to marry her. She agrees, so they marry.

While living there, she meets an old woman who looks after the castle and the woman gives her the keys but warns her that if she uses one, the castle will fall to pieces. After a time, curiosity overcomes her, and she opens a door and finds a snakeskin. Her husband, a magician, uses it to change shape. Because she used the keys, the castle then falls to pieces. The girl cries, breaking off a sprig of rosemary, and goes to search for him.

She finds a house of straw where the people, living there, take her in service. However, she grows sadder by the day. When her mistress asks why, the daughter tells her story, and her mistress sends her to the Sun, the Moon, and the Wind, to ask for help. The Sun can not help her, but gives her a nut and sends her on to the Moon; the Moon can not help her but gives her an almond and sends her on to the Wind; the Wind does not know where her husband is, but says he will look. He learns her husband was hidden in the palace of the king and is to marry the king's daughter the next day.

The daughter implores him to put it off if he can, and after giving her a walnut, the Wind blows on the tailors sewing for the wedding and destroys their work. The daughter arrives and cracks the nut, finding a fine mantle. She sells it to the princess for a great sum of gold. The almond holds petticoats, which she also sells. The walnut holds a gown, and for this she demands to see the bridegroom. The princess finally agrees, and when she goes in, she touches him with the rosemary which brings his memory back, and they go back to her home.

== Analysis ==
=== Tale type ===
Catalan scholars Carme Oriol and Josep Pujol classified the tale in the index of Catalan rondallas ('fairy tales'), with the typing 425A, Amor i Psique. In the Catalan typing, the heroine pulls a thyme bush ('farigola') and meets the enchanted prince; she breaks a prohibition and loses him; she is then forced to search for him and finds him just as he is about to marry another woman; she uses the thyme to make him remember. However, the tale is classified in the international Aarne-Thompson-Uther Index as type ATU 425A, "The Animal (Monster) as Bridegroom". In this tale type, the heroine is a human maiden who marries a prince who is cursed to become an animal of some sort. She betrays his trust and he disappears, prompting a quest for him.

According to Hans-Jörg Uther, the main feature of tale type ATU 425A is "bribing the false bride for three nights with the husband". In fact, when he developed his revision of Aarne-Thompson's system, Uther remarked that an "essential" trait of the tale type ATU 425A was the "wife's quest and gifts" and "nights bought".

=== Motifs ===
In Spanish variants the heroine typically reaches the house of the Sol ('Sun'), Luna ('Moon') and Aire ('Air' or 'Wind').

==== The animal husband ====
According to scholarship, the form of the animal husband may vary between Spanish and Hispano-American tradition, but the lizard as his enchanted form is "common" to both continents. Similarly, the animal husband appears in Catalan tales as a "repulsive animal", such as lizard, dragon, or serpent, or as an animal that is symbolic of sexual potency, such as bear or donkey.

==== Other motifs ====
The unwitting theft is a common motif, but in fairy tales, the usual offender is the father, as in The Singing, Springing Lark or Beauty and the Beast; the motif is found in other folktales, such as the ballads Tam Lin and Hind Etin.

Finding the husband can change shape is a common thread in stories of this type, but the discovery that the husband can become a beast is rare; usually, as in East of the Sun and West of the Moon, The Black Bull of Norroway, The Brown Bear of Norway, The Enchanted Snake, and The Enchanted Pig, the bride finds her animal bridegroom is also a man. Furthermore, the usual disaster stems not merely from the discovery but the attempt to break the spell on him—although it is not unique for the violation of the taboo to bring disaster, as in The Tale of the Hoodie.

The quest is common to all fairy tales of this type, and the specific motifs of the Sun, the Moon, and the Wind are found in others, such as The Enchanted Pig and The Singing, Springing Lark.

In most variants, all the magical treasures are used to bribe the heroine's way to the hero, but the false heroine manages to trick the hero to nullify it, instead of this tale's technique where she actually sells the first two things.

According to Maria de la Pau Janer, stories of the cycle of the enchanted husband/wife mostly reference their transformation in the title, with six texts being named after a plant that plays a large role in story. Among the plants, the romaní appears in two of them.

== Variants ==
=== Spain ===
According to Catalan scholarship, tale type AaTh 425A registers 15 variants in Catalonia, 1 in North Catalonia, 6 texts in Mallorca and 1 in Menorca.

Folklorist Aurelio Macedonio Espinosa Sr. collected a Spanish tale titled El Castillo de Oropé ("The Castle of Oropé"). In this tale, a poor broom-maker has three daughters. One day, he is gathering brooms when a hardacho ('lizard') appears to him and makes an offer: the man's youngest daughter for the opportunity to gather all the brooms he can. They strike a deal, but the man sends his two elder daughters in an attempt to circumvent the deal. The lizard notices the deception and the man's youngest daughter goes to him and they marry. At night, the hardacho takes off the lizard skin and becomes a handsome prince, but in the morning puts on the lizard skin again. The lizard husband tells the girl she cannot tell anyone about it, nor lose sight of the skin. Unable to reveal the truth, she is endlessly mocked by her elder sisters, until she says her husband is human, and not a lizard. Her sisters then advise her to burn the lizard skin.

While her husband is asleep in human form, the girl takes his animal skin and burns it. The man wakes up and says he is disenchanted, but gives a pilgrimess dress and iron shoes for his wife and tells her she will only find him after wearing the iron shoes and reaching the Castle of Oropé, then departs. The girl wanders off until she finds a convent of nuns, where she gains an acorn, and a convent of friars, where she is given a nut.

Next, she reaches the house of the moon, the house of the Sun and the house of the Air, and asks for directions. The Air says he can take her to the Castle of Oropé, which he does. The girl finally enters the castle and takes out a splendid spinning wheel to trade with the princess of Oropé for a night with the (now human) lizard prince. She fails on the first night, because he remains fast asleep. On the second night, the girl cracks open the acorn given by the nuns and finds another spinning wheel she trades for a second night. Lastly, she cracks open the nut given by the friars, and finds a third spinning wheel which she trades with the princess for a third night with the prince.

The girl manages to ask her husband if he remembers about when her father met him, and how he gave her the pilgrimess dress and iron shoes. The human lizard says yes to her questions, but the princess forces her out of the room. At the end of the tale, during his marriage to the princess, the human lizard asks the guests about a key he once had for a golden box, and a second he had made, but managed to find the first one. The guests answer he should keep the first key - which is his first wife.

In a Spanish tale translated to Russian with the title "Околдованный принц" ("The Enchanted Prince"), a poor sweeper has three daughters, and goes to fetch some broomshrubs to make new brooms. One day, he goes to cut off a branch, and a voice complains the man is pulling his hair. The voice belongs to a dragon that demands the man delivers him the first thing he sees at home, and he shall become rich. The man returns home and his youngest daughter greets him. The man tries to trick the dragon by sending his elder daughters to the tree to pull up the branch, but the dragon asks for the youngest. The third daughter comes and pulls the branch, and finds herself in a grand palace. She walks around a lush garden and goes to sleep.

At night, the dragon comes to her, explaining he is a dragon by day, but will become human at night, and asks the girl to look after the dragonskin and not to tell anyone about him. They live together like this, until one day she wishes to visit her family, and the dragon allows for a three days and three nights visit. The girl returns home, and her sisters mock her marriage, but the girl reveals about the prince, and takes her sisters with her to the dragon's castle. The sisters burn the dragonskin and the girl lights up a candle for them to better see her beloved, but a drops of wax falls on his body, waking him up. The prince wakes up and admonishes her for not obeying him, for the curse was almost at an end, and she will have to find him at the Golden Castle by wearing out seven pairs of iron shoes.

Before he departs, he gives her three coals that can grant her anything she wishes, and vanishes, taking the garden and the castle with him. Time passes, the girl gives birth to their son, dons the iron shoes for her and her son, and begins a quest for her husband at the Golden Castle. She passes by the houses of the Moon, then his brother Sun, and finally their brother, the Wind. The Wind takes mother and son to the Golden Castle, where a wedding banquet is being held in the prince's honour. The girl uses each of the magic coals to wish for three spinning wheels (the first of "indescribable beauty" on the first day, the second of silver on the second day, and the third of golden on the third day), which she takes out to draw attention to herself. A servant of the princess that is marrying the prince sees the stranger with the spinning wheels and tells the princess. The girl agrees to a deal: she trades the spinning wheel for a night in the prince's quarters. The princess drugs the prince with a potion and he sleeps through the night. The girl tries to talk to her husband the first night and fails, which also happens on the second night. On the third day, the prince suspects something is amiss and throws the potion in the fire, then is informed his true wife and son are there. On the third night, the girl enters his room and they reunite.

The following morning, the prince summons his court, asking them he had a golden box with key, which he lost and had a new one made, but found the old one - which one he should keep? The courtiers answers he should keep the first one, and the prince answers the stranger is his first wife, and stays with her.

Professor James Taggart collected a tale from informant Juana Moreno. In her tale, a father prepares to go to the fair, and asks his three daughters what he can get them. The elder daughter asks for a dress, the middle one for shoes, and the youngest for three singing roses. The man finds the singing roses in a garden somewhere and tries to pluck some, but a large snake appears to him. The snake orders the man to have his youngest daughter to wait for the snake at the snake's door. The girl goes to the snake for two nights, and the snake turns into a king.

One night, the girl's sisters probe her about the snake, and she eventually tells them about the snake that becomes a king. On the snake's third visit, he comes and tells the girl that, for betraying the secret, she needs to seek him with iron shoes. The girl goes to the house of the mother of the Wind (where she gets a walnut), to the house of the mother of the moon (where she gets an apple), and to the house of the mother of the Sun (where she gets a pomegranate). She learns from the sun that the snake king has gone to another town and married another spouse. The girl goes to the town and cracks open the walnut (which produces a twist of gold), the apple (which produces a spool of golden thread) and the pomegranate (which produces a golden hen with golden chicks), and uses the golden objects to bribe the second spouse for three nights with her husband. The girl goes to the king's chambers and tries to call out to him (in her lamentation, she calls herself Rosita Rosaura, and calls him Rey Culebrón). She manages to wake him up on the third night.

=== Latin America ===
==== Argentina ====
Folklorist and researcher Berta Elena Vidal de Battini collected a tale from Corrientes, Argentina. In this tale, titled El príncipe lagarto ("The Lizard Prince"), a queen gives birth to a lizard for a son, and dies. The widowed King tries to raise the lizard prince. Years later, the lizard says he wants to get married, and the king finds a rich man's daughters as potential brides. The lizard marries the elder sisters, who dies of fright, then the middle sister, who also dies of fright. He lastly marries the younger sister. The tale then explains the lizard prince is an enchanted prince, whom the girl has never seen at night, for he takes off the lizard skin in the darkness. Some time later, the girl is approached by an old witch who advises her to get the lizard skin and burn it in an oven, but away from him. The girl follows the witch's instructions and destroys the prince's lizard skin. However, he wakes up and admonishes his wife, saying that in 30 days time his curse would have ended, but now he will go to the city of "Que va y no vuelve". He vanishes. The girls goes after him and passes by the house of the Sun and his mother, the house of the Moon and his mother, and the house of the Wind and his mother. In the house of the sun and the moon, she gains dresses the colour of the sun and the moon, and in the Wind's she is gifted a golden hen with chicks that talk, on a golden platter.

She finally reaches the city of Que Va Y No Vuelve, and discovers her husband is to be married to another princess. She takes out the gifts from the elements to bribe the princess so she can speak to the prince for three nights. She fails for the first two nights, but manages on the third. The prince avoids drinking a sleeping potion on the third night, and recognizes his wife. The next day, the prince organizes a large banquet where fruits are served to the guests. The princess's father refuses to eat apples. To this, the lizard prince says he cannot marry the princess, for he already has his true wife by his side.

In an Argentinian tale from Salta with the title El Lagarto ("The Lizard"), a couple has a child whose father does not recognize as his son, so he lives in the mountains. Twelve years later, the son goes back home and forces his parents to find him a bride, otherwise he will devour his father. The couple find a woman with three daughters and bring in the elder one to their son, Lizard, but she dies of fright. The Lizard son asks for another bride, and they bring the middle sister, who also dies of fright. The Lizard complains his brides-to-be are too cowardly, but the bring in the third daughter, who is braver. They marry, and the Lizard, asks her to prepare a virque (a large kettle) for him inside a room, and not to open the door, since he will be very busy. After eight months, she opens the door and finds a handsome youth. He complains for his wife's curiosity and tells her to find him at the "paraíso del oro fino".

The girl then begins a journey and passes by the house of an old woman, who is the Virgin and the ruler of the birds. The girl says she is in search of the Lizard, and the old woman summons the birds to discern his location. No bird knows where he is, save for a latecomer eagle. The eagle carries the girl on its back to the paraíso del oro fino. She learns her husband, the Lizard, married another woman and cries, but she attends mass at the local church with dresses her husband gave her, made of the lizard's skins. The second wife wants to buy the dress, and the Lizard's true wife trades it for one hour with the human Lizard, who is given a remedy to sleep, so he cannot react to his first wife. The second time, she trades a second dress for two hours with the human Lizard, who drinks another remedy. The third time, the Lizard is told by a male servant a girl comes to talk to him at night, so he avoids drinking the remedy. The third night, the first wife trades the third dress to talk with the Lizard youth and he recognizes her. The human Lizard sends his second wife away and stays with his first wife at the "chozas de plata".

Scholar Susana Chertudi collected an Argentinian tale titled Los tres picos de amor ("The Three Summits of Love"), a seamstress lives with her woodcutter father. One day, while he is cutting wood, he lifts a rock and finds a frog, who asks the man to marry his daughter in exchange for making him rich. The man tells his daughter about it, and she agrees. The frog tells the man to hit his ax on a tree trunk and finds some gold coins. The girl follows the frog underneath the rock and lives in a palace, but is told by the frog she cannot see him at night when he comes at night. In time, she gets curious about her husband's face, and decides to light up a candle one night: she finds a golden-haired youth next to her. She accidentally lets a drop of candlewax fall on his frogskin, and he wakes up. The frog youth admonishes her, telling her to find the eagle of the three summits of love, and vanishes, taking the palace with him. The girl finds herself lost in a wasteland, and wanders off. She meets a chuña that gives her a magic comb, a fox that gives her a pericote (a little mouse), a quirquincho that gives her a mirror, and an iguana that gives her a guitar. Eventually, she finds the eagle, which says it old and its three daughters are flying over the golden-haired prince's wedding feast in order to procure sheep meat for them. The girl tells the eagle she was invited to the party, and the bird summons its three daughters back to her with a trumpet. After the eagle's daughters return with much meat, the old eagle eats large portions before taking the girl to the prince's wedding. On the aerial journey, however, the meat rations are depleted and the girl cuts off part of her buttocks to feed the eagle. When the eagle lands, it notices the girl gave it part of her flesh and restores it. The girl introduces herself as a guest and is allowed entry into the feast. She then takes out the comb and draws out the prince's second wife's attention, who sends her black maidservant to buy it from the newcomer. The girl trades it for a time with the prince. She tries to talk to him, but he is sleeping. She trades the other gifts from the animals, until she plays on the guitar and wakes her husband. She explains he is the golden-haired prince (who was the frog)'s true wife. The prince then dismisses the second wife and remains with the woodcutter's daughter.

==== Chile ====
In a Chilean tale titled El Príncipe Jalma ("The Prince Jalma"), a poor man has a beautiful daughter. One day, he goes to the woods to chop down wood and axes a large trunk as to draw blood from it. An "ugly black man" appears to him and demands the man's daughter in marriage, in exchange for the gold inside the tree. The man's daughter agrees to the marriage and the black man sets up a condition: the wedding is to be held in the dark. The wedding occurs with little complication, and the girl and the black man live like husband and wife for some time. One day, an old woman neighbour comments with the girl about her husband, but the girl answers that she has never seen him! So, the old woman gives her a flint to light up their bed at night. The girl follows the old woman's advice and sees that her husband is a handsome prince. However, a spark falls on his face and wakes him up. He despairs at the fact that his wife betrayed him, and tells her to seek him, Prince Jalma, by wearing iron shoes. The girl begins her quest and passes by the house of the North Wind (whose mother gives her a golden hen with chicks and some golden wheat); the house of the South Wind (whose mother gives her a golden spool); the house of the Puelche Wind that blows in the Andes (whose mother gives her a golden comb); the house of the Fraresia, or "Setting Wind" ('Poniente', in the original), who does know where Prince Jalma is: he is prisoner to an old witch, who intends to marry him to her daughter, and locks him under seven locks. Fraresia promises to take her there, and its mother gives the girl a little golden bowl ("palanganita"). Per Fraresia's suggestion, the girl uses the golden gifts to bribe the witch's daughter for a night with the prince, since their wedding is to happen in four days time. On three nights, Prince Jalma cannot wake up, since the witch's daughter gave him a sleeping potion, but he wakes up on the fourth night, embraces his first wife and orders the execution of both the witch and her daughter. Author Thos. H. Moore translated the tale into English as Prince Jalma. In his translation, the heroine travels to the North Wind, the South Wind, the Puelche Wind (which he explains is the east wind) and the Travesia Wind (which he explains is the west wind). The tale was also translated as The Story of Prince Jalma, and published in The Brownies' Book.

== Occurrences ==
The Sprig of Rosemary appears in Bridget Hadaway's book, Fairy Tales.

== See also ==
- The Lizard With the Seven Skins
