= Boskednan stone circle =

Prehistoric stone circle in west Cornwall, England

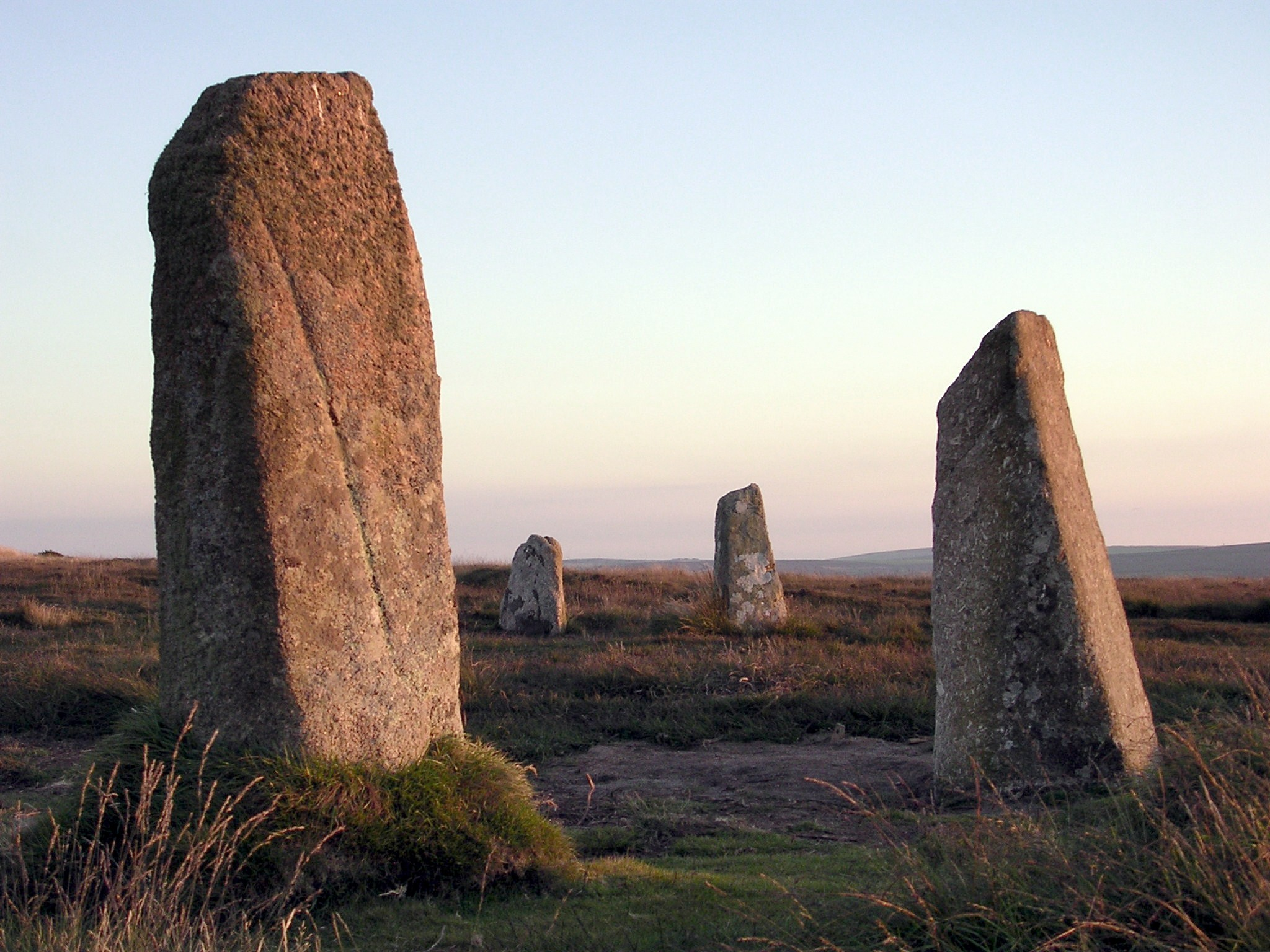
- Restored stones at the Boskednan circle

- Location within Southwest Cornwall
- Interactive map of Boskednan stone circle
- 50°09′38″N 5°35′37″W
- Type: Stone circle
- Periods: Neolithic / Bronze Age
- Location: Boskednan, Madron, Cornwall, England

Site notes
- Owner: CASPN

Scheduled monument
- Official name: Large regular stone circle known as the 'Nine Maidens' and a round cairn 690m north-west of Killiow Farm
- Designated: 30 November 1926
- Reference no.: 1006738

Boskednan stone circle (grid reference SW434351) is a partially restored prehistoric stone circle near Boskednan, around 4 miles (6.4 kilometres) northwest of the town of Penzance in Cornwall, United Kingdom. The megalithic monument is traditionally known as the Nine Maidens or Nine Stones of Boskednan, although the original structure may have contained as many as 22 upright stones around its 69-metre perimeter.

== Location ==
The stone circle is in southwest Cornwall north of the road from Madron to Morvah, and is approximately 1 km northwest of the village of Boskednan and can only be reached on foot. The enigmatic Mên-an-Tol stones (which may also be the remains of a stone circle) are less than 1 kilometre to the southwest.

== Description ==
Boskednan stone circle consists of a ring of granite stones set in open upland countryside in west Cornwall. The stones form a roughly circular shape about 22 metres (72 feet) across.

Archaeologists believe the circle originally contained around twenty-two stones placed around the edge of the ring. Today ten stones survive. Six of these still stand upright, while the others lie fallen or partly buried in the grass.

Most of the stones are relatively small compared with some other stone circles in Britain. Many stand about 1 metre (3.3 feet) high, although the tallest reach nearly 2 metres (6.6 feet). The stones are natural pieces of local granite rather than carefully shaped blocks, giving the monument a rugged and irregular appearance.

The stones are spaced unevenly around the circle. This may reflect the original layout, but it is also possible that some stones have been lost or moved over time.

Unlike some prehistoric monuments, the circle does not appear to have been surrounded by a ditch or earth bank, and there is no known central stone or chamber within the ring.

A round burial cairn lies nearby and may once have formed part of the same ceremonial site. The circle also stands within a wider prehistoric landscape that includes other ancient monuments, such as the stones at Mên-an-Tol to the southwest.

== History ==
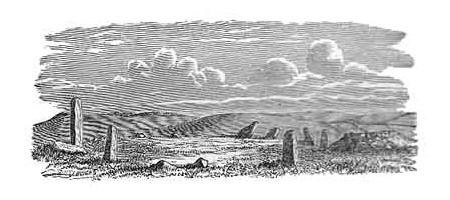
Illustration by William Copeland Borlase 1872

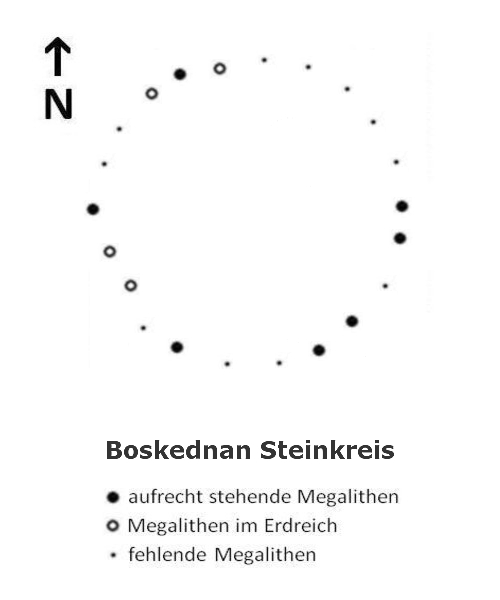
Position of the stones

Stone circles such as that at Boskednan, were erected in the late Neolithic or in the early Bronze Age by representatives of a Megalithic culture. The first mention of the stone circle in modern times, in 1754, is found in the work Antiquities, historical and monumental, of the County of Cornwall by William Borlase, who reported 19 upright standing stones. William Copeland Borlase, a descendant of the earlier Borlase, conducted excavations and found a cist and a funerary urn near the stone circle, dating from the early Bronze Age. Borlase described his discoveries in 1872 in his work Naenia Cornubiae, which concerns prehistoric monuments of Cornwall.

== See also ==
Other prehistoric stone circles in the Penwith region

- Boscawen-Un
- The Merry Maidens - also known as Dans Maen
- Tregeseal East - also known as the Tregeseal Dancing Stones
