= Francisco Maspons y Labrós =

Catalan folklorist and notary

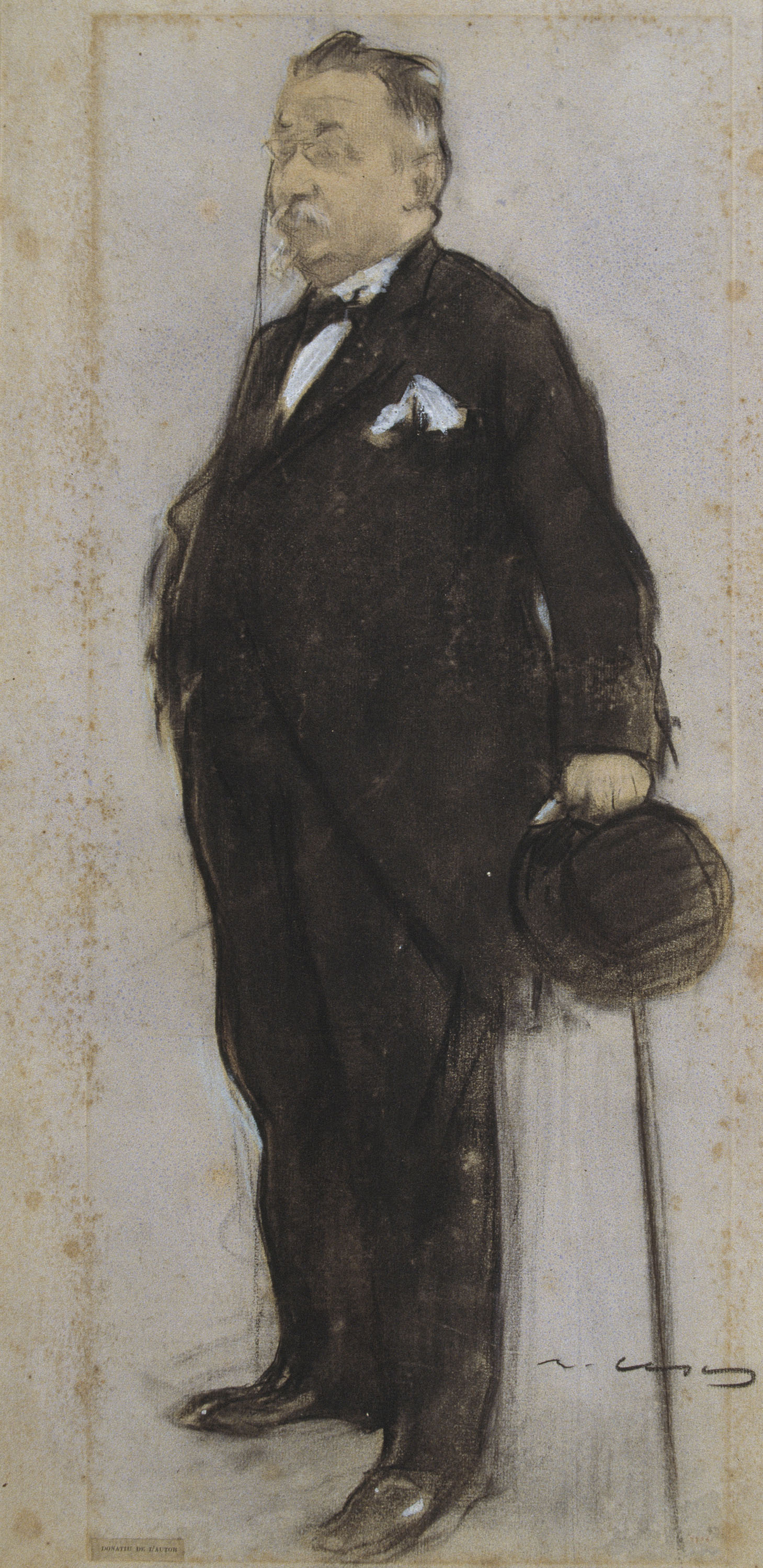
Portrait of Maspons y Labrós by Ramon Casas, conserved at MNAC in Barcelona.

D. Francisco de Sales Maspons y Labrós (Granollers, Vallès Oriental, Catalonia, Spain, 1840 — Bigues i Riells, Vallès Oriental, Catalonia, Spain, 1901) — in Catalan, Francesc de Sales Maspons i Labrós — was a Catalan folklorist, doctor of law and notary, as well as brother of the writer Maria del Pilar Maspons i Labrós. In addition to becoming dean of the notary college of Barcelona, he chaired the Jocs Florals de Barcelona (Floral Games of Barcelona) in 1897 and l'Associació d'Excursions Catalana in 1883–91, and effected the latter's union with l'Associació Catalanista d'Excursions Científiques to create the Centre Excursionista de Catalunya, over which he presided (1892–96).

He collaborated with, among other publications, Lo Gai Saber, Calendari Català and La Renaixença. His son Francesc Maspons i Anglasell also published numerous works.

== Works ==
- Lo Rondallayre: Contes Populars Catalans; Barcelona, Verdaguer; first series 1871; second series 1872; third series 1875.
- Jochs de la infancia (1874)
- Tradicions del Vallés (1876)
- Les bodes catalanes (1877)
- De Mollet á Bigas (1882)
- Lo Vallès (1882)
- Fantasies y tradicions (1884)
- Cuentos populars catalans; Barcelona (1885)
- Semprevives (1885)
- L'Excursionisme catalá (1894)
- Miquel Grau (1894)
- Discurs illegit (1895)

== See also ==
- The Water of Life (Spanish fairy tale)
- The Wounded Lion
- The Sprig of Rosemary
