= Tregeseal East stone circle =

Prehistoric stone circle in Cornwall, England

- Meyn an Dons
- The Dancing Stones
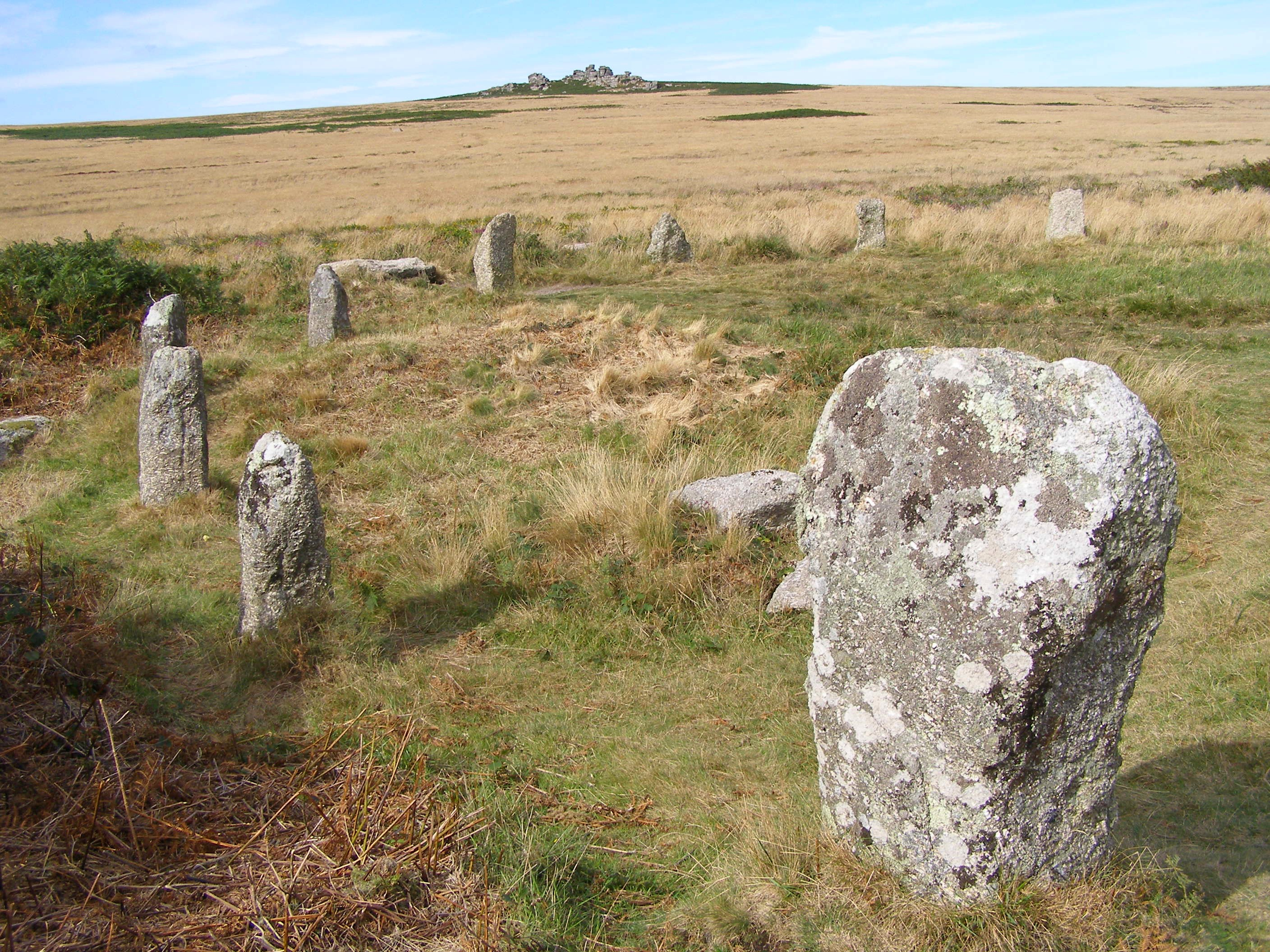
- Tregeseal East stone circle with Carn Kenidjack beyond

- Location in Cornwall, England
- 50°8′1.39″N 5°39′30.67″W
- Type: Stone circle
- Periods: Late Neolithic to Early Bronze Age
- Location: near St Just in Penwith, Cornwall, England
- Region: Penwith

History
- Built: c. 2000 BC

Site notes
- Material: Granite
- Height: 1–1.4 m (3.3–4.6 ft)
- Diameter: c. 21 m
- Condition: largely intact; partially restored
- Public access: yes

The Tregeseal East stone circle (Cornish: Meyn an Dons, meaning "Stones of the Dance"; grid reference SW386323) is a heavily restored prehistoric stone circle around one mile northeast of the town of St Just in Cornwall, United Kingdom. The 19 granite stones are also known as The Dancing Stones. It is the one surviving circle of three that once stood aligned along an east–west axis on the hillside to the south of Carn Kenidjack.

== Location ==
The stone circle is in west Cornwall north of the road from Penzance to St Just in Penwith and is approximately one kilometer east of the hamlet of Tregeseal.

== Construction ==
The stone circle consists of 19 granite blocks with a height between 1–1.4 m (3 ft 3 in – 4 ft 7 in), which describe an approximate circle with a diameter of around 21 m (69 ft). Two stones are probably missing, since the circle consisted of 21 stones in earlier times. The stone circle was subjected over the centuries to substantial rebuilding and restoration work, so that today only the stones in the eastern half of the circle may be in their original positions.

The stone circle was part of a larger ritual area, similar to the area around The Merry Maidens, It consisted of a possible three stone circles in a general east–west alignment. The other two stone circles were to the west of the existing stone circle. The proposed westernmost of the three circles was detected on RAF aerial photographs from 1947; if a circle, it is much smaller in diameter than the other two and could possibly depict a hut circle instead. The middle stone circle, which originally had the largest diameter and contained ten stones in 1885, today only a single stone is to be found standing.

The Tregeseal East stone circle (Cornish: Meyn an Dons, meaning "Stones of the Dance"; grid reference SW386323) is a heavily restored prehistoric stone circle around one mile northeast of the town of St Just in Cornwall, United Kingdom. The 19 granite stones are also known as The Dancing Stones. It is the one surviving circle of three that once stood aligned along an east–west axis on the hillside to the south of Carn Kenidjack.

== Archaeology and discoveries ==
The Tregeseal East stone circle has been documented by antiquarians and archaeologists since the eighteenth century, forming part of a long tradition of recording prehistoric monuments in west Cornwall. Early descriptions, drawings, and surveys provide important evidence for the monument's condition before later restoration and stone loss altered its appearance.

The earliest known modern description appears in 1754 in Antiquities, Historical and Monumental, of the County of Cornwall by the Cornish antiquarian William Borlase. Borlase recorded 17 upright stones arranged in a circular form on the hillside south of Carn Kenidjack. His work was among the first systematic attempts to document Cornwall's prehistoric remains and helped draw scholarly attention to the concentration of stone circles in the Penwith district.

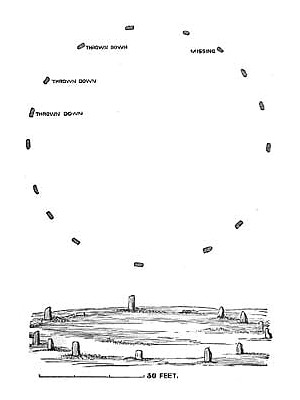
Illustration by W. C. Borlase, 1872

In the early nineteenth century the monument was illustrated by William Cotton in his 1827 work Illustrations of Stone Circles, Cromlehs and other remains of the Aboriginal Britons in the West of Cornwall. Cotton's drawing records the appearance of the circle at a time when the remains of neighbouring circles to the west were still more clearly visible in the surrounding landscape. Further documentation was produced later in the nineteenth century by William Copeland Borlase, who carried out one of the earliest detailed surveys of Cornwall's prehistoric monuments. In Naenia Cornubia (1872) he recorded 15 standing stones at Tregeseal East and published a plan showing their positions within the circle.

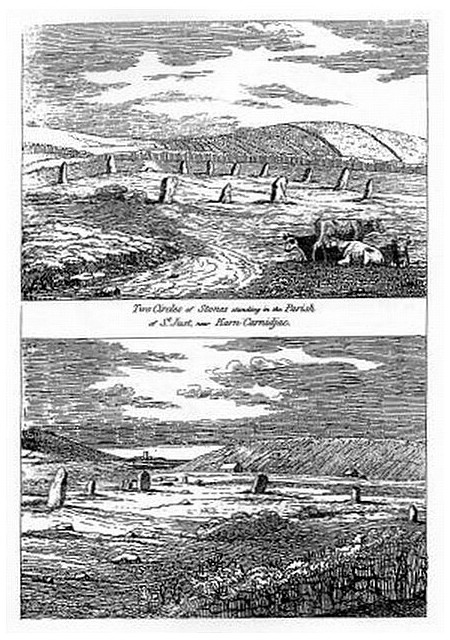
Illustration by William Cotton, 1827

Twentieth-century research helped clarify the wider archaeological context of the monument. Aerial photographs taken by the Royal Air Force in 1947 revealed traces of another circular feature to the west of the surviving circle. This feature may represent the remains of a third stone circle aligned with the other two along an east–west axis across the hillside, although its smaller size has also led some researchers to suggest that it may represent a prehistoric hut circle rather than a ceremonial structure.

These observations indicate that Tregeseal East formed part of a broader prehistoric ceremonial landscape on the slopes south of Carn Kenidjack. Similar groupings of stone circles occur elsewhere in west Cornwall, including sites such as The Merry Maidens and Boscawen-Un, where circular monuments appear to have functioned as focal points within wider prehistoric ritual landscapes.

== See also ==
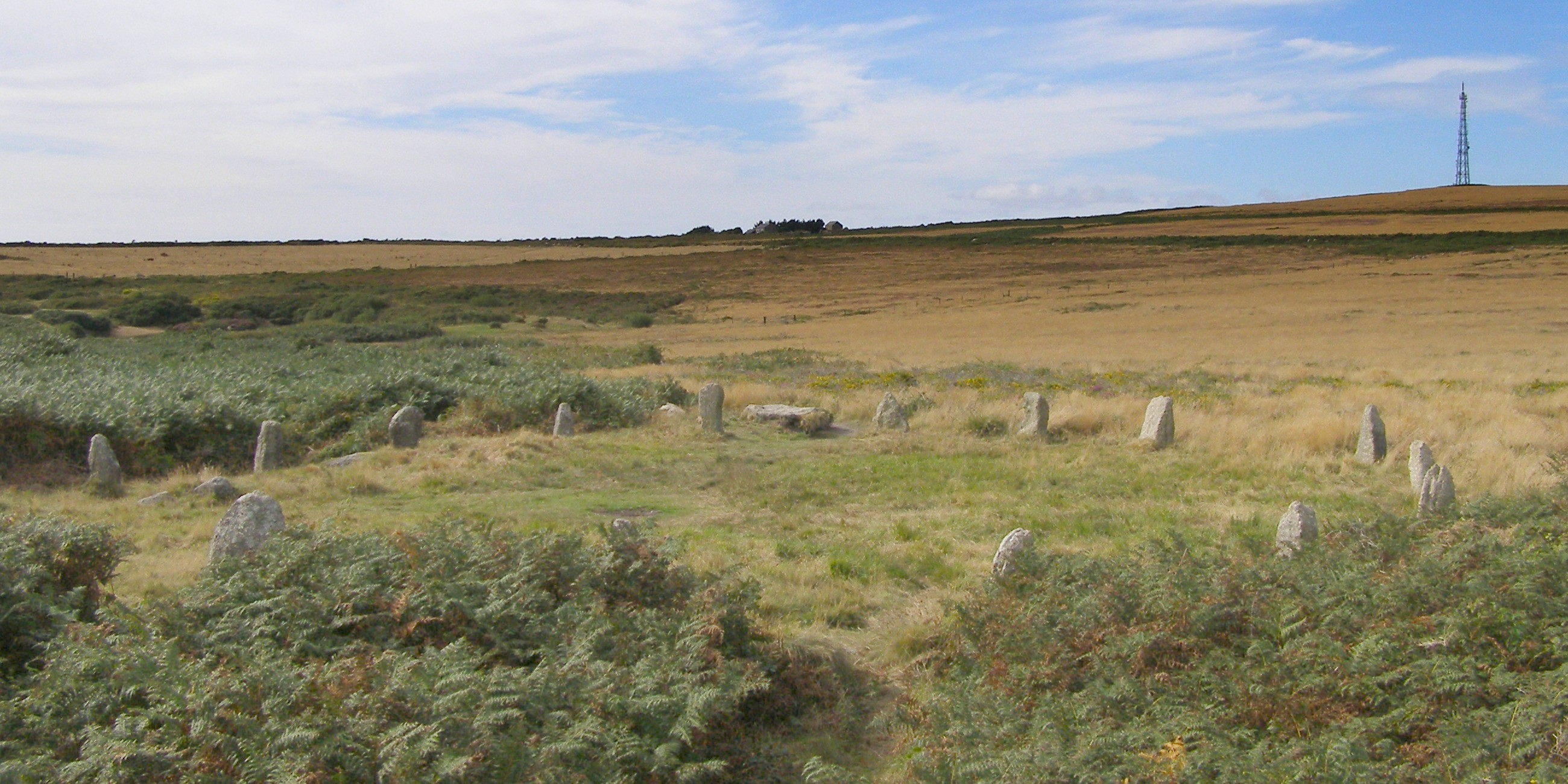
Tregeseal East stone circle from the east

Other prehistoric stone circles in the Penwith district

- Boscawen-Un
- The Merry Maidens – also known as Dans Maen
- Boskednan – also known as the Nine Maidens of Boskednan
