= The Pipers, St Buryan =

Standing stones near St Buryan in Cornwall, England

The Pipers
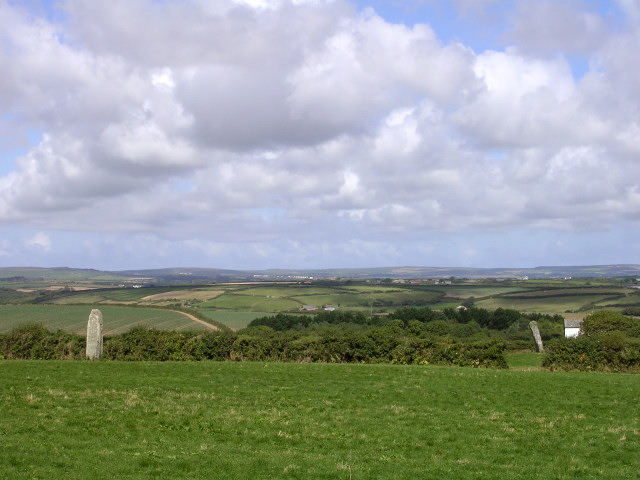

- Location within Southwest Cornwall
- 50.068338°N 5.585082°W
- Type: Standing stones
- Periods: Neolithic / Bronze Age
- Cultures: Cornish
- Location: St Buryan
- OS grid reference: SW435248

The Pipers are a pair of standing stones near The Merry Maidens stone circle located 2 miles (3 km) to the south of the village of St Buryan, in Cornwall, United Kingdom.

== Description ==
The Pipers are on a northeast to southwest alignment which points almost directly at The Merry Maidens. The two stones stand in separate fields about 90 metres apart. The southwest stone is the taller of the two, measuring 4.7 metres high—there are two longitudinal cracks down the northwest side, and one down the southeast side. The northeast stone is 4.2 metres high and is of rectangular section—the stone leans to the northwest.

== Myth and legend ==
The name of these two stones derives from a legend that they were in fact two pipers who were turned to stone for playing music on the Sabbath for the nearby dancing Merry Maidens. A different legend states that the two stones were set up following a 10th-century battle in which the Anglo-Saxon English, led by Æthelstan, fought the Cornish Celts, led by Howel and supported by the Danes. The Pipers were said to mark the positions of the two opposing leaders.

== Research ==
The stones were first recorded by William Borlase in 1754. His descendant William Copeland Borlase excavated the stones in 1871 with no result.

== See also ==
- Boleigh Fogou, northeast of The Pipers
- Tregiffian Burial Chamber, southwest of The Merry Maidens
