= Boskednan =

Coordinates: 50.1561°N 5.5829°W

Boskednan: Cornish: Boskednan
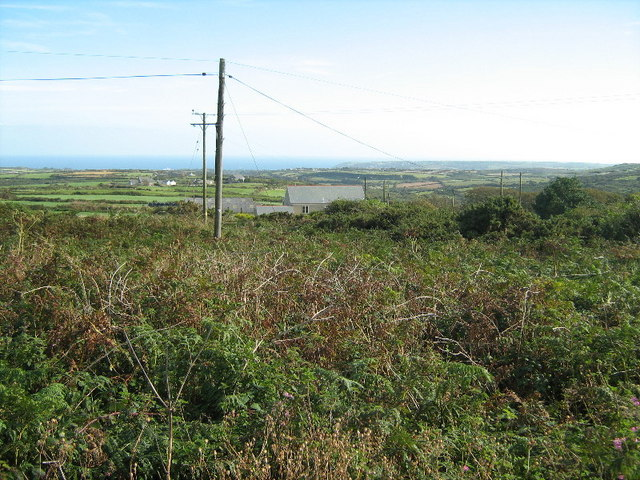
- Looking over Boskednan

- Location within Cornwall
- OS grid reference: SW4434
- Civil parish: Madron
- Shire county: Cornwall
- Region: South West
- Country: England
- Sovereign state: United Kingdom
- Post town: Penzance
- Postcode district: TR20
- Police: Devon and Cornwall
- Fire: Cornwall
- Ambulance: South Western

Boskednan (Cornish: Boskednan) is a hamlet near Mulfra Hill northwest of Penzance in west Cornwall, United Kingdom. It is in the civil parish of Madron.

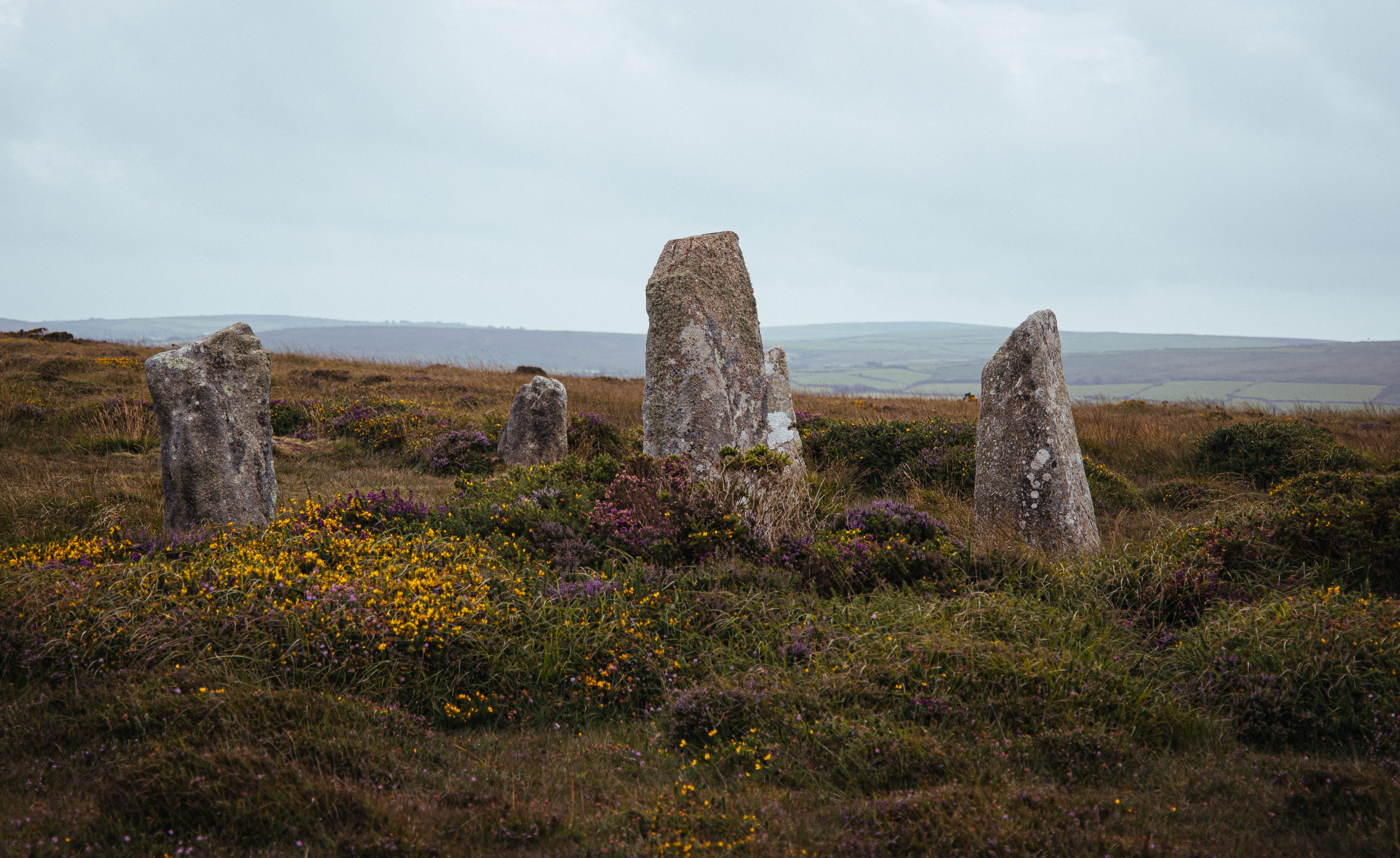
Boskednan stone circle

The Boskednan stone circle, also called the Nine Maidens of Boskednan, is nearby. The stone circle was built in either the Neolithic or Bronze Age period.
