= Gugh =

Tidal island of the isles of Scilly

Coordinates: 49.896°N 06.333°W

Gugh: Cornish: Keow
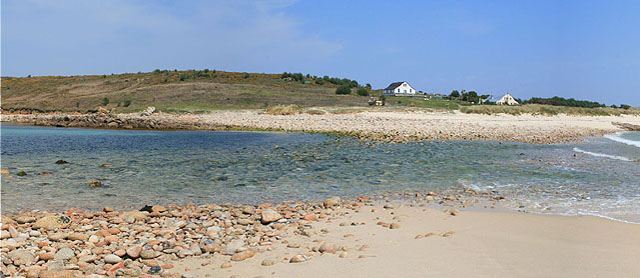
- Central Gugh, seen from The Bar

- Location within Isles of Scilly
- Population: 3
- Civil parish: St Agnes
- Unitary authority: Isles of Scilly
- Ceremonial county: Cornwall
- Region: South West
- Country: England
- Sovereign state: United Kingdom
- Post town: ISLES OF SCILLY
- Postcode district: TR22
- Dialling code: 01720
- Police: Devon and Cornwall
- Fire: Isles of Scilly
- Ambulance: South Western
- UK Parliament: St Ives

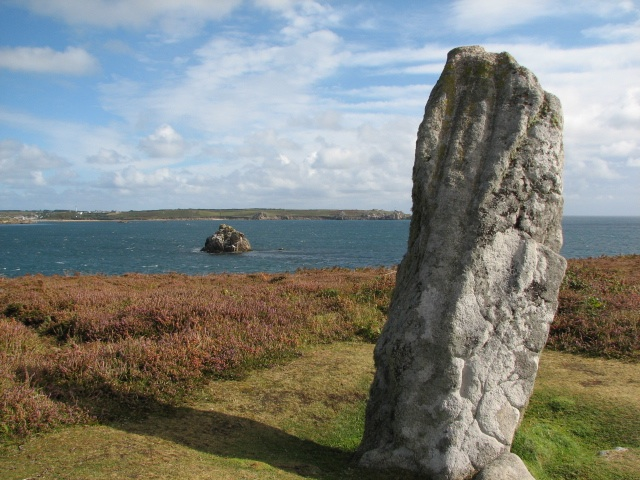
The Old Man of Gugh

Gugh (/ɡjuː/ GHEW; Cornish: Keow, lit. 'hedge banks') could be described as the sixth inhabited island of the Isles of Scilly, but is usually included with St Agnes with which it is joined by a sandy tombolo known as "The Bar" when exposed at low tide. The island is only about 1 km (0.62 mi) long and about 0.5 km (0.31 mi) wide, with the highest point, Kittern Hill, at 34 m (112 ft). The geology consists of Hercynian granite with shallow podzolic soils on the higher ground and deeper sandy soils on the lower ground. The former Gugh farm is just north of the neck across the middle of the island between the two hills. The two houses were designed and built in the 1920s by Charles Hamlet Cooper.

The island lies within the Isles of Scilly Heritage Coast, is in the Isles of Scilly Area of Outstanding Natural Beauty and is managed by the Isles of Scilly Wildlife Trust. Vegetation cover is mainly wind-pruned heath or dense bracken and bramble with a small area of coastal grassland formed over blown sand which has accumulated near the bar.

In 2013, the Isles of Scilly Seabird Recovery Project was set up by a number of organisations including the Royal Society for the Protection of Birds (RSPB) and the Isles of Scilly Wildlife Trust. The five-year project aimed to keep the islands of St Agnes and Gugh free of the brown rat (Rattus norvegicus), in order to assist the survival of breeding sea birds. A programme of habitat restoration began in January 2016 with the removal of the invasive Pittosporum (Crassifolium species).

== History ==
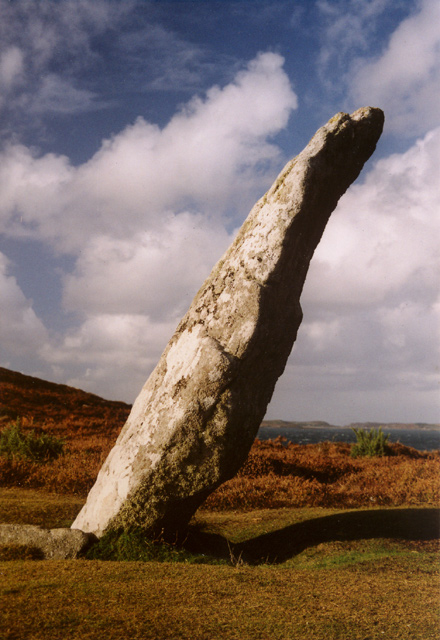
The Old Man of Gugh

The earliest signs of occupation on Gugh are two groups each, of entrance graves and Bronze Age cairns. Entrance graves are either burial or ritual monuments and cairns are burial mounds. A lack of finds, most likely because of acid soils destroying any evidence, makes the dating of the monuments difficult, but a few pottery remains date them to late Neolithic or early Bronze Age. On Kittern Hill there are five entrance graves, one of which (Obadiah's Barrow) was excavated in 1901, by George Bonsor, and ″disarticulate unburnt bones″ found. There is also a cluster of fourteen cairns which are linked by prehistoric field walls or banks but the relationship between the two is not established. The only menhir to be excavated on Scilly is the Old Man of Gugh, a 2.7 m (9 ft) tall standing stone which lies at the base of Kittern Hill, but there was no features or finds. There is also a cluster of nineteen cairns and a field system on the south part of Gugh along with a further two entrance graves. An English Civil War battery was built over one on Carn of Works and its chamber re-used as a magazine. The Civil War defences are concentrated around the Scillonian coast to defend the deep-water approaches. Part of Gugh is a Scheduled Monument and the whole island is recommended for scheduling.

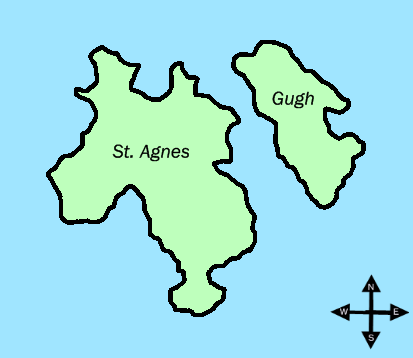
The islands of Gugh and St Agnes

For centuries Gugh seems to have been uninhabited and used by the residents of St Agnes for cattle grazing. Two kelp pits have been recognised, one on the north-east side of Kittern Hill and the second at Tol Tuppens. Burning seaweed was introduced in 1684 by Mr Nance on Teän to provide sodium carbonate for glass-making, and continued until 1835. Kelp burning only produces 2–3 percent sodium carbonate, and during the 19th century more efficient commercial and industrial methods ended the practice locally.

In the 1920s, a retired surveyor and former consulting engineer of the Corporation of Wimbledon, William Hamlet Cooper (died 10 September 1932), formerly of Colchester, secured the lease of the island, built the two buildings that can be seen today and started a farm. He lived on the island, along with his housekeeper. In a 1925 letter to the Western Morning News he wrote of his attempts to control black-backed gulls (greater or lesser is not recorded), which included constant shooting and the destruction of nearly 2,000 eggs. In 1924, none of his animals could graze on the northern part of the island during the nesting season due to attacks on his cattle and sheep, which included the loss of a valuable ram which never recovered from the injuries received. In Cooper's will it states that if he died on Gugh he should be buried on the island at Kittern Hill (place of death is not mentioned). An auction of the animals and crops owned by Cooper occurred on Gugh on 21 October 1932. Animals listed were 80 fowls (mostly white leghorn), two Kerry cows, a heifer, two farm horses and 69 pigs. Also for sale was 5 tons of potatoes, 50 cartloads of mangold wurzels, 5 tons of hay, 3 tons of barley grain, 35 cwt of bran and 10 tons of lime. The buyer also had the right to harvest 2 acres of narcissus bulbs (Soleil d'Or, Scilly White and Princeps).

A fire on the island in September 1933 burnt for a week with the island said to be ablaze from end to end. The fire was put out by the staff of Major Dorrien-Smith and the farmhouse and farm buildings owned by Mr Theo Bond and his wife, the only inhabitants, were saved. The Bonds formerly lived on St Martin's, spent their honeymoon on Gugh, and decided to live there and continue flower production.

== Natural history ==
The island was first notified as a Site of Special Scientific Interest (SSSI) in 1976 and re-notified under the 1981 Act in 1986. All of the land designated as Gugh Site of Special Scientific Interest is owned by the Duchy of Cornwall. The SSSI covers an area of 36.6 hectares (90 acres), of which 35.3 hectares (87 acres) was assessed as "unfavourable recovering" when it was reviewed on 30 July 2010.

"Although the vascular plant assemblage (VPA) is favourable the notified heathland habitat is recorded as unfavourable recovering. The VPA species are all present and occurring in suitable habitat except for small adder's-tongue (Ophioglossum azoricum) which has not been recorded on this site since 1986, however, the former site appears suitable for the species and is therefore recorded as favourable".

The reasons for the unfavourable assessment is because there is too much ground cover of bramble (Rubus fruiticosus) and Pittosporum, and the heath on Kittern Hill is less interesting than on the rest of the island. The reason is probably because of a fire on the hill in 1972 and subsequently there is less Cladonia sp. (a lichen). The Pittosporum requires urgent control and the island needs grazing to return it to a favourable condition. There is also a problem with the recent appearance of stone mazes which should be discouraged.

The notifiable habitats for Gugh are the heath communities; H7, H8 and H11.

=== Flora ===
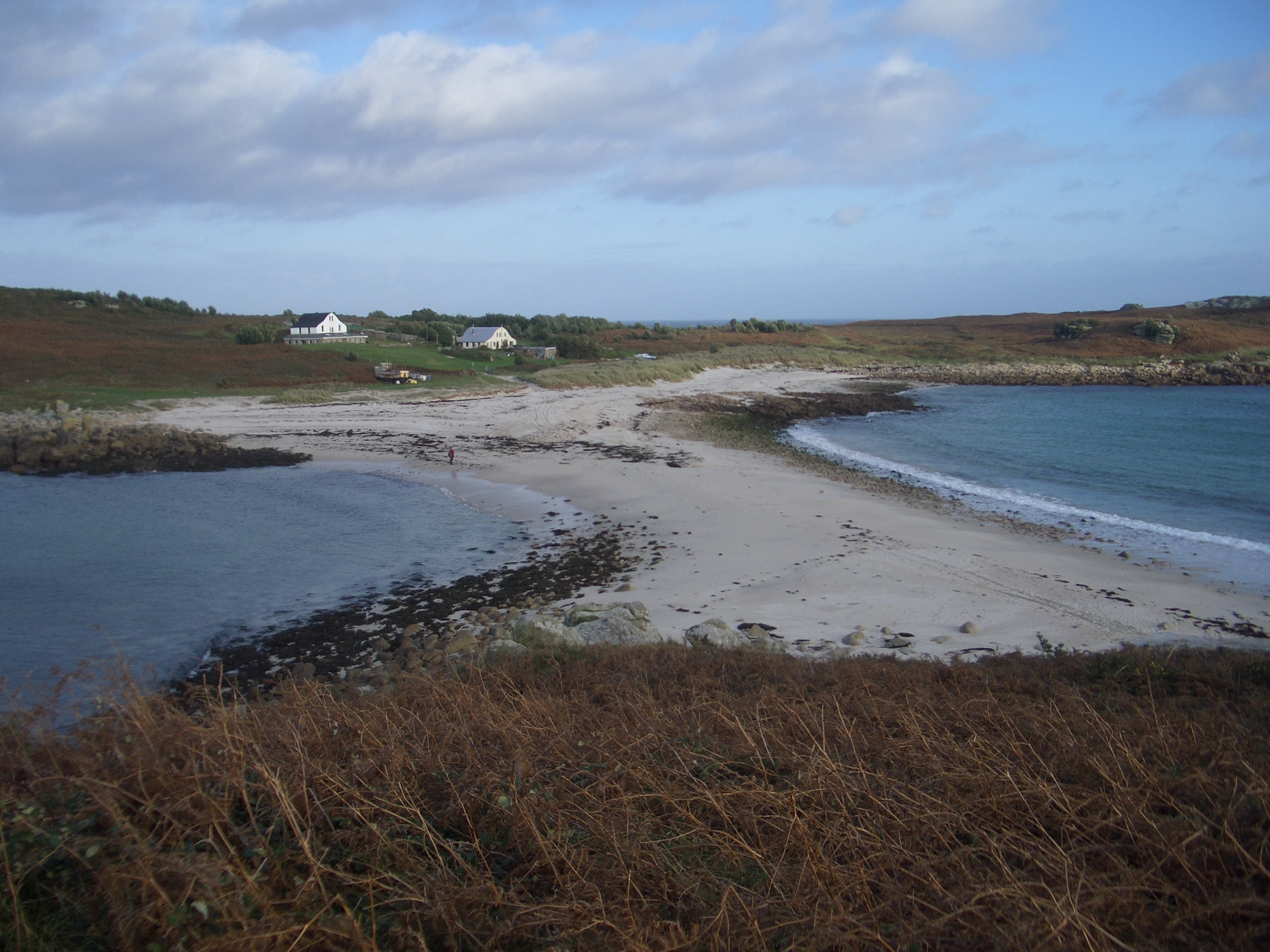
The tombolo looking from St. Agnes towards Gugh

Much of the vegetation of Gugh is either wind-pruned, dry, waved maritime heath or dense gorse and bracken. The three dominant species on the heath are heather (Calluna vulgaris), bell heather (Erica cinerea) and western gorse (Ulex gallii). Immediately above the bar is a small area of dune grassland merging into maritime grassland around the coastal fringe. On the small dune system grows western clover (Trifolium occidentale), sea holly (Eryngium maritimum), sea spurge (Euphorbia paralias) and Portland spurge (Euphorbia portlandica), wild thyme (Thymus polytrichus) and sea bindweed (Calystegia soldanella). The neck of the island between the two hills where the farm was located has an unusual flora. Amongst dense bracken is balm-leaved figwort (Scrophularia scorodonia), common here but not found elsewhere on the island and an unidentified yellow, cultivated rose. A second alien, Argentine dock (Rumex frutescens) grows on the edge of a sand pit which was originally intended to be a reservoir. The fields below the two houses were, before 1933, fertilised with "shoddy" – a high-nitrate manure derived from the woollen industry. Within these fields can be found viper's-bugloss (Echium vulgare), common melilot (Melilotus officinalis) and wild mignonette (Reseda lutea). All three are thought to be imported arable weeds. In the 1960s "the neck" was a closely cropped sward of grass, but after myxomatosis decimated the population of rabbits, the area became overgrown with bracken and bramble.

In October 1972, a fire on Kittern Hill burnt through the shallow peaty soil to the granite. Bleached stones and blackened gorse stems can still be seen and the vegetation has not recovered sufficiently to equal the waved heath elsewhere on Scilly. Heath is on the hills on both sides of "the neck", and in the south of the island the nationally rare orange bird's-foot (Ornithopus pinnatus) can be found, as can rare lichen species such as Lobaria pulmonaria and golden-hair lichen (Teloschistes flavicans).

==== Rare plants ====
- Shore dock (Rumex rupestris) first discovered here in 1893 by John Ralfs still extant in the 1960s but now extinct.
- Small adder's-tongue (Ophioglossum azoricum) has not been seen since at least the mid-1980s. The site was on the east coast between Carn Kimbra and Point Witcher. The only area of the SSSI that was classified as "favourable".
- Four-leaved allseed (Polycarpon tetraphyllum) was recorded by Lousley in 1939 and 1940.

=== Fauna ===
In July 1924, W. N. Blair caught a shrew which he did not recognise and sent a specimen to the British Museum for the attention of Martin Hinton, who identified it as the lesser white-toothed shrew (Crocidura suaveolens). Known as the "Scilly shrew", the type specimen is held by the British Museum. The other mammals found on Gugh are feral cats, rabbit (Oryctolagus cuniculus) and possibly the house mouse (Mus musculus). Permanent monitoring stations, consisting of boxes with chocolate wax inside, have been set up around the coasts of both Gugh and St Agnes and a 50 m (164 ft) baiting grid will be set up around any signs of rats. As of 2015 the brown rat is most likely eradicated on the island.

Rabbits are currently the only grazing animal and in the 1960s myxomatosis decimated the population and led to an increase of scrub on parts of the island, especially "the neck" where in some years cuckoos (Cuculus canorus) were attracted by the large numbers of garden tiger moth (Arctia caja) and other large caterpillars. In one year the number of garden tiger larvae was 90 per square metre. The last grazing animals left in 1974 and Natural England would like grazing animals back on Gugh to counteract the effects of the scrub and dense sward of grass covering parts of the island. A cobalt deficiency in the soil means grazing animals need supplements.

In the southern part of the island large colonies of lesser black-blacked (Larus fuscus graellsii) and herring gull (Larus argentatus) breed, as do a small number of greater black-backed gull (Larus marinus). Storm petrel (Hydrobates pelagicus) and kittiwake (Rissa tridactyla) no longer breed there. To protect and enhance the islands' seabirds, and to protect Annet (an important breeding site) from re-invasion, a feasibility study was carried out to see if it was possible to eradicate rats from the Isles of Scilly. A winter trapping survey on St Agnes and Gugh indicated that those islands had a population of 3,300 brown rats. It was found the rats foraged on a variety of food including Scilly shrew which were found in the stomach contents of 18% of the rats trapped. Furthermore, numbers of the shrew were higher in areas where the rats were controlled; an indication that rats are having an effect on their numbers. The survey showed that it was both feasible, and there are significant benefits, to remove the rats as they are preventing Manx shearwater and storm petrel from establishing on St Agnes and Gugh.

In 2009 lesser black-backed gull bred on Gugh but with low chick productivity, and the small colony of kittiwake nested, but failed for at least the fourth year. Following the rat eradication programme, 12 Manx shearwater chicks fledged on Gugh and St Agnes in September 2014. As of 2025 the RSPB states that there are now 154 Manx shearwater pairs.

==== Vagrant birds ====
- A white-tailed eagle (Haliaetus albicilla) with a wingspan of 7 ft 6 in (2.29 m) was shot on Gugh in November 1909. Another was seen on the Isles including once seen eating a shag (Gulosus aristotelis) at Gugh (and spotted at Bosigran, Zennor) from April 1947 onwards; it was supposed to roost on Gugh.
- A two–barred greenish warbler was found by Colin and Tom Bradshaw on Gugh from 21 to 27 October 1987. A first for Britain and Ireland.

==== Insects ====
Lepidoptera

1. Cocksfoot moth (Glyphipterix simpliciella), very common
2. Nothris congressariella, the larvae feed between spun leaves of balm-leaved figwort (Scrophularia scorodonia) and first recorded on Gugh in May 1994
3. Epagoge grotiana – recorded on 9 July 1995
4. Scoparia subfusca, recorded by day in 1993
5. Common carpet (Epirrhoe alternata) – recorded in 1995
6. Purple bar (Cosmorhoe ocellata) – recorded in the years 1993, 1994 and 1995

=== Habitat restoration ===
In 2013, the Isles of Scilly Seabird Recovery Project was set up by a number of organisations including the RSPB and the Isles of Scilly Wildlife Trust. The five-year project aims to keep the islands of St Agnes and Gugh free of the brown rat (Rattus norvegicus), in order to assist the survival of breeding sea birds, which lost 25% of their populations between 1983 and 2006. The rats eat the eggs and kill the chicks of those birds that nest in burrows or on the ground. Rat removal began in October 2013 by a team of thirty volunteers led by Wildlife Management International Limited (WMIL) of New Zealand, and there have been no signs of rats on St Agnes and Gugh since December 2013.

The ranger team of the Isles of Scilly Wildlife Trust started to remove pittosporum from some areas in 2016. By 2019, three acres (1.2 hectares) had been removed from the sea-bird breeding areas and archaeology sites. They also created a mosaic of differing vegetation heights in the areas of grassland to create conditions favourable for orange bird's-foot and clovers, which need short turf, and in longer grass, Babington's leek and grass balm-leaved figwort.

== See also ==
- British National Vegetation Classification
- South Walls in Orkney
