= Teän =

Island of the Isles of Scilly, UK

Enys Tian
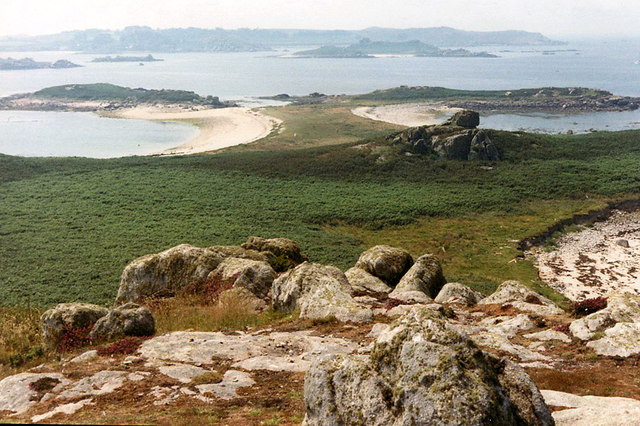
- Teän, view from the Great Hill

- Location within Isles of Scilly

Geography
- Coordinates: 49.9680°N 6.3123°W
- OS grid reference: SV908164
- Archipelago: Isles of Scilly
- Area: 0.062 sq mi (0.16 km^{2})

Administration
- United Kingdom
- Civil parish: Tresco

Demographics
- Population: 0

Teän (/ˈtiːən/ TEE-ən, sometimes written Tean without the diaeresis; Cornish: Enys Tian) is an uninhabited island to the north of the Isles of Scilly archipelago between Tresco, 1.5 kilometres (0.9 mi) to the west, and St Martin's, 300 metres (330 yd) to the east. Approximately 16 hectares (40 acres) in area, the island consists of a series of granite tors with the highest point, Great Hill, rising to 40 metres (130 ft) at its eastern end. The low-lying land is overlain with glacial till and outwash gravels with glacial erratics abundant on the north coast beaches, which indicates the southern limit of outwash from an ice sheet for which it is designated a Geological Conservation Review site.

There is evidence of occupation from the Bronze Age to the early 19th century and the island was still being grazed in 1945. An early Christian chapel exists on the island; it was possibly dedicated to a saint called Theon.

The island lies within both the Isles of Scilly Heritage Coast and the Isles of Scilly Area of Outstanding Natural Beauty. It is managed by the Isles of Scilly Wildlife Trust, which has a Higher Level Stewardship (HLS) agreement.

== History ==
The coastline of Teän consists of a number of bays and sandy beaches that link to offshore rocks and carns at low tide. The western part of the island has low-lying ground linking granite carns; field boundaries from the Romano-British period can be seen at extreme low tides. One of the carns, Old Man, has an early structure, a Bronze Age entrance grave, as does Great Hill in the east of the island. Roman type brooches have been found in a grave on Old Man. Sixteen early Christian graves have been found under the east wall of St Theona's chapel which was built later on top of the graves. There was probably an earlier wooden chapel.

A Parliamentary survey of 1652 reported one man living in a ruined house on the island; in 1684, there was a thatched cottage between East Porth and West Porth that belonged to a Mr Nance, who is reputed to have introduced kelp burning to Scilly. Kelp burning provides sodium carbonate for glass making and the practice continued in the islands until 1835. Kelp burning only produces 2–3 percent sodium carbonate; during the 19th century more efficient commercial and industrial methods ended the practice locally. Rights to areas of kelp were allocated to families; in 1787 Thomas Woodcock, his son and James Ashford (all of St Martin's) were accused of "having trespassed on his (Nance's) preserves". After the hearing, the court decided that the cutting of ore-weed and the making of kelp on Teän was the prescriptive right of Nance, and the trespassers were fined 2s 6d each. His family continued to live on Teän for several more generations; by 1717 there were ten people living on the island, but in 1752 William Borlase only saw fields of corn and ruined buildings. In the 19th century Woodley reported occasional occupation, a few acres of cultivation and sheep grazing; while a 1919 guide book reported just a rabbit warren. Cattle were still being grazed in 1945.

== Natural history ==
The island was first notified as a Site of Special Scientific Interest in 1971 and re-notified in 1986 under the 1981 Act. The SSSI was last assessed on 8 September 2009 and was found to be favourable. The assessment found that the vascular plant assemblage was all recorded apart from four-leaved allseed Polycarpon tetraphyllum. A key issue was lack of management for orange bird's-foot (Ornithopus pinnatus), which needs short turf and can be addressed with the HLS agreement held by the Isles of Scilly Wildlife Trust. All of the land designated as the Teän Site of Special Scientific Interest is owned by the Duchy of Cornwall.

=== Flora ===
Human activity continued until relatively recently and is evident with 8 ha of the island surrounded by hedges and once cultivated. This area, with deeper soils, is dominated by bracken (Pteridium aquilinum) and still has relic pasture plants such as rye grass (Lolium perenne), red clover (Trifolium pratense), hop trefoil (Trifolium campestre) and black knapweed (Centaurea nigra). The maritime grassland around St Helen's Porth, and on the south coast, has abundant thrift (Armeria maritima) and sea campion (Silene maritime), and near Clodgie Point orange bird's-foot (Ornithopus pinnatus) occurs. The dune grassland area behind East and West Porth is important for the very rare dwarf pansy (Viola kitaibeliana). The summit of Great Hill has a small area of lowland heath.

==== Rare plants ====
- Shore dock (Rumex rupestris) was first recorded in 1984 and was still there in 2005. It is a Biodiversity Action Plan species and one of the primary reasons why the Isles of Scilly is a Special Area of Conservation (SAC).
- Four-leaved allseed (Polycarpon tetraphyllum) was last recorded in 1990.
- Saltwort (Salsola kali) was recorded in 2009. It was once found on most sandy beaches in Scilly but is now a rare plant; its previous record on Scilly was 2004 on Samson.

=== Fauna ===
The only mammals found on Teän are the Brown Rat (Rattus norvegicus) and the House Mouse (Mus musculus). Rabbit (Oryctolagus cuniculus) may be extinct. With no grazing animals on the island, plants that prefer a short sward such as orange bird's-foot may become extinct. In 1850 J. W. North reported that Teän "is a preserve of white rabbits"! Scilly Shrew (Crocidura suaveolens) bones have been found in Roman or early medieval middens; it was last recorded in 1964. There are no recent records.

==== Breeding birds ====
The SSSI citation lists five species of breeding birds on the island including the Puffin (Fratercula arctica). Other breeding seabirds are the Kittiwake (Rissa tridactyla), Herring Gull (Larus argentatus), Lesser Black-backed Gull (Larus fuscus) and a small number of Greater Black-backed Gull (Larus marinus). The seabird breeding colonies are in decline on the Isles of Scilly; in the years 2006–09 the Kittiwake has failed to breed on all the islands bar one chick raised on St Agnes in 2009. Of the species listed above, none have been recorded as breeding on Teän in 2009.

A pair of Marsh Harrier (Circus aeruginosus) bred on Teän in 2008 with two juveniles seen.

==== Invertebrates ====
Teän was the site of groundbreaking mark-and-recapture population studies of the Common Blue (Polyommatus icarus) butterfly by entomologists E. B. Ford and Prof W. H. Dowdeswell, who camped on the island from 26 August to 8 September 1938. They marked each insect with a dot of cellulose paint so that it was possible to tell the date of first capture and any subsequent recaptures. The Common Blue is not a migratory butterfly and no marked butterflies were captured on the west side of St Martin's, so additions to the Teän population were likely to be mainly emergences and losses due to death. It was noted that the normal form of the butterfly was found on St Mary's, Tresco and St Martin's whilst on Teän there is a separate race, due to isolation. Ford's description is below.

The females obtained in the summer (I have no knowledge of the spring form) have an extensive scattering of pale silvery-blue scales, so that they are most unlike those found elsewhere, which are neither blackish or else marked with a violet shade. Moreover, the form from Tean is associated with a characteristic variation on the under-side of the hind-wings, which affects both sexes; for in a large proportion of the specimens the two spots placed along the coastal margin are united, forming a short curved line, and other varieties in spotting are frequent. We seem to here a stage in the evolution of an independent sub-species.

Recent visits have not found the Common Blue to be significantly different on Teän so Ford's remarkable form no longer seems to exist; unusual female colour forms and aberrations may just occur more frequently on Scilly than elsewhere.

Red Barbed Ant (Formica rufibarbis)

The Red Barbed Ant has been described as "...perhaps the rarest resident animal in mainland Britain" with only four nests in Surrey and extinct in Cornwall (last recorded in 1907). It is found on St Martin's, the Eastern Isles and also Teän where it was recorded in 2008. Its favoured habitat is open heathland with plenty of bare ground. Queens from St Martin's are captured and taken to Surrey to maintain those colonies.
