= Halangy Down =

Iron Age village on the island of St. Mary's, in the Isles of Scilly

Halangy Down Ancient Village
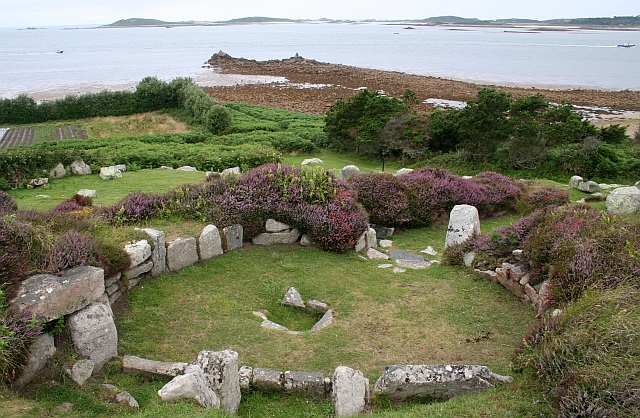
- Halangy Down Ancient Village

- Location within Isles of Scilly
- 49°55′55″N 6°18′23″W
- Periods: Iron Age, Roman-Britain
- Region: Isles of Scilly

History
- Built: Iron Age

Halangy Down (or Halangy Down Ancient Village) is a prehistoric settlement located on the island of St Mary's, in the Isles of Scilly. The ancient site covers the lower slope of Halangy Down hill, overlooking the coastal inlet between the island of St. Mary's and Tresco Island. On the site are the remains of an Iron Age village, two entrance graves, prehistoric field systems, standing stones, post-medieval breastworks, and a Victorian kelp pit. The settlement was in continuous use for 500 years, from the late Iron Age until the end of the Roman occupation in Britain.

== Description ==
Halangy Down is a hill on the island of St. Mary's in the Isles of Scilly. At the top of the hill, on its southwestern border and overlooking the coastal inlet between St. Mary's and Tresco Island, lies the Bronze Age entrance grave, Bant's Carn. Below the grave, further down the slope, are the remains of the Iron Age settlement, "Halangy Down Ancient Village". The settlement complex, spanning four narrow terraces, is 50 metres (55 yards) long by 30 metres (33 yards) wide, and stretches across the lower slope of the Down on its southwest boundary. The remains of the ancient village show evidence of continuous settlement from the prehistoric to the Roman period in Britain. Another entrance grave stands at the foot of the slope.

Between the Bronze Age grave and the ancient settlement are the remnants of prehistoric field systems that are discernible as a sequence of terraces and raised banks. The layout of the once thriving village can be seen in the large stone and rubble remains of stone huts, buildings and a courtyard complex with multiple rooms. At the foot of the northwestern slope, is a prehistoric standing stone made of granite. It measures 1.75 metres (5 ft 9 in) high by 1 metre (3 ft 3 in) wide and 0.7 metres (2 ft 4 in) thick. Behind the cliff's edge, there is a line of low bank and ditch fortifications, built in the mid-seventeenth century and in use during the English Civil War. From the late seventeenth to the early nineteenth centuries, soda-ash was manufactured on Halangy Down in a stone-lined kelp pit. The kelp pit is situated 2.5 metres (2.7 yards) behind the edge of the cliff and can easily be seen as a stone-lined, circular hollow. The pit is 1.4 metres (4 ft 7 in) in diameter, 0.6 metres (2') deep, and shaped as like an upturned cone.

== History ==
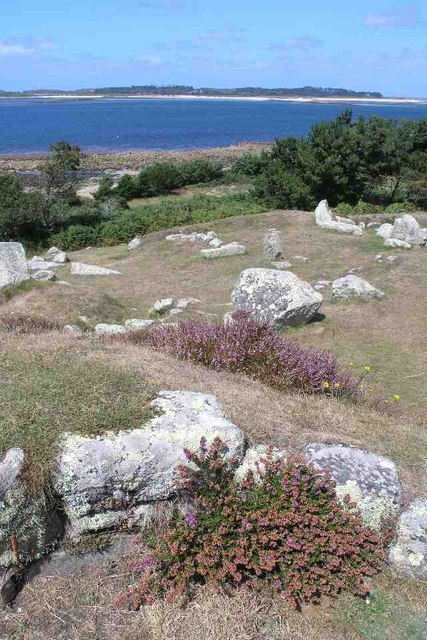
The Halangy Down settlement

The Halangy Down Ancient Village was first settled during the Bronze Age. Archaeological excavations conducted in 1935, 1950, and 1964 to 1970, revealed that the first stone structures were built during the Iron Age (800 BC - 100 AD). Evidence shows that the buildings were continually altered and replaced over the 500-year period of occupation, from the later Iron Age to the Roman period of occupation in Britain (43 AD - 410 AD). The village was made up of a complex of attached stone houses. One house, a large multi-room residence with an interconnecting courtyard, had been built in the Romano-British period. The excavation findings included Iron Age, Romano-British and Anglo-Saxon pottery; flint and quartz tools; a slate spindle-whorl; several millstones; bronze brooches and iron slag.

In the early years of development, the village consisted of oval or round stone houses with thick walls. The houses had cone-shaped, thatched roofs and small storage chambers that were built into the walls. Houses were faced with large stones and rubble. The size of the houses varied from 7.5 metres (25') by 5.1 metres (16'), to 7 metres (23') by 6.75 metres (22 ft 2 in). The structures also had one or two entrances, which consisted of faced passages up to 2.2 metres (7 ft 3 in) wide. In the last stages of development, a large courtyard complex, including a large house with multiple rooms, was built at the south east end of the settlement. The complex was laid out with several rooms leading off a small courtyard, and the entire complex was surrounded by an enormous wall. The entry to the complex was through a narrow passage. A large midden adjacent to the north west wall of the courtyard house was uncovered during excavation, revealing a large pile of limpet shells. Other detritus at the site included fish, cattle, sheep, pig and horse bones.

== See also ==
- Innisidgen
- Porth Hellick Down
- Obadiah's Barrow
