= Scheduled monuments in Cornwall =

This is a list of scheduled monuments in Cornwall, United Kingdom. Monuments are listed by Historic England as part of the National Heritage List for England. For the scope of this list, the Isles of Sicily are included and the ceremonial county boundaries are used.

This list is incomplete, more monuments may be included in Category:Scheduled monuments in Cornwall.

== Scheduled monuments ==
- Carfury Standing Stone
- Greystone Bridge
- Kelly Rounds
- Madron Well and Madron Well Chapel
- Penstowe Castle
- Perran Round
- Restormel Castle
- Sperris Quoit
- Treen Cliff
- Warbstow Bury

=== Owned by the Duchy ===
Sites owned by the Duchy of Cornwall and managed by English Heritage. The Duchy also owns scheduled monuments in Devon, Dorset, and Hertfordshire.

- Hurlers Stone Circles, St Cleer
- Launceston Castle, Launceston
- Restormel Castle, Lostwithiel
- Tintagel Castle, TIntagel

==== Scilly ====
- Bants Carn Burial Chamber and Halangy Down Ancient Village, St Mary's, Isles of Scilly
- Innisidgen, St Mary's, Isles of Scilly
- Porth Hellick Down, St Mary's, Isles of Scilly
- The Garrison Walls, St Mary's, Isles of Scilly
- Harry’s Walls, St Mary's, Isles of Scilly
- Cromwell's Castle, Tresco, Isles of Scilly
- King Charles's Castle, Tresco, Isles of Scilly
- The Old Blockhouse, Tresco, Isles of Scilly

=== National Heritage List for England ===
These place-names are taken directly from searching the NHLE, you can help by adding their common names. The numbers are each sites NHLE reference number. The full list in this section should contain 1346 entries.

- Round with annexe 530m north east of Lower Padreda – 1003076
- Bowl barrow 70m north east of Killarney – 1003083
- Bowl barrow 480m south of Traboe Cross forming part of a round barrow cemetery on Goonhilly Downs – 1003089
- Hut circle settlement 950yds (870m) NW of Gwenter Farm – 1003102
- Boslow Cross 550yds (500m) NW of Boslow Farm – 1003110
- Part of the mining complex at Wheal Grenville and East Wheal Grenville Mines 210 north west of Newton Moor Farm – 1003117
- Bowl barrow 680m north west of Trewithick Farm – 1003272
- Hut circle 280yds (250m) SW of Trevarthen – 1001725
- Hut circle 440yds (400m) SW of Candra – 1004222
- Ring cairn 295m north west of Candra – 1004223
- Three bowl barrows between 120m and 820m south of Brynn Barton Cottage – 1004231
- Round 750m north east of Trelaske House – 1004237
- Wayside cross 95m WSW of Trelaske House – 1004238
- Iron Age defended settlement 425m west of Trebray – 1004240
- Two batteries and part of a third at Maker Heights called Redoubt No1, Redoubt No2 and Redoubt No3 – 1004254
- Round 450yds (405m) NW of Lower Chellew Farm – 1004262
- Round 220m south east of The Level House – 1004270
- Hut circle on Carnyorth Common 200yds (180m) W of Carn Kenidjack – 1004278
- Hut circles with associated field system 400yds (360m) SW of Little Higher Bosullow – 1004316
- Round barrow 400yds (370m) NW of Traboe Cross – 1004323
- Courtyard house 280m north west of Middle Carnaquidden – 1004353
- Chapel at Hall – 1004361
- Medieval chapel in the grounds of Shillingham Manor – 1004363
- Two bowl barrows 570m south west of Polkerth forming part of a larger round barrow cemetery on Goonhilly Downs – 1004374
- Motte castle 80m north west of the church at Week St Mary – 1004386
- Kerbed cairn 100m NNW of Chapel Carn Brea – 1004389
- Three bowl barrows 350m north of Poldhu Cove – 1004396
- Wayside cross at Trengwainton Carn – 1004412
- Courtyard house settlement and field system and medieval farmstead 440m south of Bosporthennis Farm Cottage – 1004421
- Stone hut circle settlement with irregular aggregate field system at Kynance Gate, 935m south east of Kynance Farm – 1004432
- Three bowl barrows 215m south east of Beech Lawn, which form part of a larger round barrow cemetery – 1004433
- Bowl barrow 230m south west of Middle Taphouse Farm, forming part of a round barrow cemetery – 1004435
- Two bowl barrows 190m east of Zacry's Islands – 1004461
- Rectangular camp SW of Trevarnon Round – 1004468
- Bowl barrow 875m SSE of Bodrugan Barton – 1004470
- Three bowl barrows 500m SSW of Leech Pool forming part of a round barrow cemetery on Goonhilly Downs -1004471
- Kerbed cairn called Hangman's Barrow – 1001728
- Round cairn and kerbed cairn 300m north east of Blackrock Farm – 1001729
- Cast iron footbridge at Perran Mill – 1001726
- Round cairn 185m NNW of Old Hilltop Farm – 1001727
- Bowl barrow 540m WSW of St Breock Downs Farm – 1004478
- Enclosed stone hut circle settlement and part of a field system 400m north of Bodrifty Farm – 1004481
- Standing stone called Tresvennack Pillar – 1004492
- Two large regular stone circles 290m north east of Hailglower Farm – 1004493
- Part of Launceston Priory 50m south-east of St Thomas' Church – 1004511
- Three bowl barrows 570m north east of Trewindle – 1004617
- Three bowl barrows 160m west of Little Hendra – 1004621
- Promontory fort called The Rumps – 1004625
- Standing stone 815m west of St Breock Downs Farm – 1004653
- Two bowl barrows, one 220m east of Lower Longbeak and the other 320m east of Higher Longbeak – 1001723
- Megalithic tomb 220yds (200m) SW of Trevarthen – 1001724
- Two bowl barrows 250m west of Silverwell Farm – 1001730
- Bowl barrow 270m south west of Castle Hill Farm – 1005451
- Barrow group on Greenbarrow Downs – 1005458
- Three barrows 550m ENE of Cansford – 1005463
- Barrow 90m E of Trelay Farm – 1005466
- Wayside Cross at Camborne Park Recreation Ground – 1003049
- Two bowl barrows 70m north west and 50m south east of Tor View at Middle Taphouse – 1003077
- Bowl barrow 430m south west of Fairy Cross Farm forming part of a round barrow cemetery – 1003081
- Deserted medieval settlement with 16th- and 18th-century structures 85m west of West Lanyon Quoit – 1003084
- Part of an early-Christian cemetery 65m north west of Tintagel church – 1003086
- Three bowl barrows forming part of a round barrow cemetery at Cataclews Point – 1003088
- Wayside cross on Druid's Hill, 350m south east of Bodmin Lodge – 1006633
- Three wayside crosses 235m south east of Bosvathick – 1006665
- Wayside cross 240m north west of Higher Predannack Farm – 1006668
- Wayside cross at Nanjarrow – 1006676
- Prehistoric inhumation cemetery at Harlyn – 1006685
- Small multivallate hillfort called Castle Dore – 1006691
- Neolithic hilltop enclosure with later settlement and defensive structures, a prehistoric field system, a medieval castle and deer park and mineral workings on Carn Brea – 1006704
- Enclosed stone hut circle settlement at Chygwidden Vean, 250m east of Land Vue – 1006715
- Promontory fort known as Treryn Dinas – 1006733
- Promontory fort at Chynalls Point – 1003103
- Courtyard house settlement with enclosure and fogou 235m south east of Porthmeor Farm – 1003071
- Wayside cross at Nanquidno Farm – 1003109
- Boskednan stone circle: Large regular stone circle known as the 'Nine Maidens' and a round cairn 690m north-west of Killiow Farm – 1006738
- Portal dolmen known as 'The Three Brothers of Grugith' – 1006746
- Boswens Menhir, also known as the Long Stone, 180m north of Halvanance Farm – 1006749
- Standing stone 200yds (180m) W of Chycarne – 1003116
- Ring bank in the NW corner of Lewannick Plantation – 1003118
- Two bowl barrows 385m south east of Higher Tregolls – 1003273
