= Bant's Carn =

Scillonian entrance grave

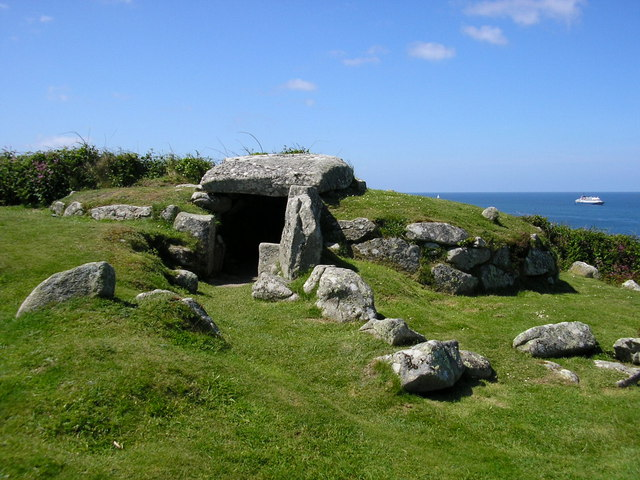
- Bant's carn, St. Mary's

- Location within Isles of Scilly
- 49.9308°N 6.3074°W
- Location: Isles of Scilly

History
- Built: Middle Bronze Age

Site notes
- Area: St. Mary's Island

Bant's Carn is a Bronze Age entrance grave located on a steep slope on the island of St Mary's in the Isles of Scilly, England. The tomb is one of the best examples of a Scillonian entrance grave. Below Bant's Carn, lies the remains of the Iron Age village of Halangy Down.

== Description ==
Bant's Carn is situated on a steep slope on the island of St Mary's in the Isles of Scilly. Below the burial monument, lies the remains of the Iron Age village of Halangy Down. The tomb measures around 8 metres (26 ft) in diameter and stands on a low platform 12 metres (39 ft) across. The entrance is 4.5 metres (15 ft) long and 1 metre (3.3 ft) high, with no roof. It is separated from the burial chamber by a jamb. The chamber itself measures around 5 metres (16 ft) in length and 1.5 metres (4.9 ft) in width and height, with four large capstones serving as a roof. The carn is partially encircled by the remains of the platform, through which the passage leads indirectly to the chamber entrance.

== History ==
The Isles of Scilly were originally settled during the Neolithic era, circa 2500 BC. Burials on the islands range in date from the later Neolithic period to the Middle Bronze Age (2500-1000 BC). Over eighty entrance graves have been discovered on the Isles of Scilly; The majority of graves were built in the middle Bronze Age (1500 to 1000 BC). Bant's Carn is an excellent example of a Scillonian entrance grave. Excavated entrance graves typically contain human remains, cremation urns, and pottery fragments.

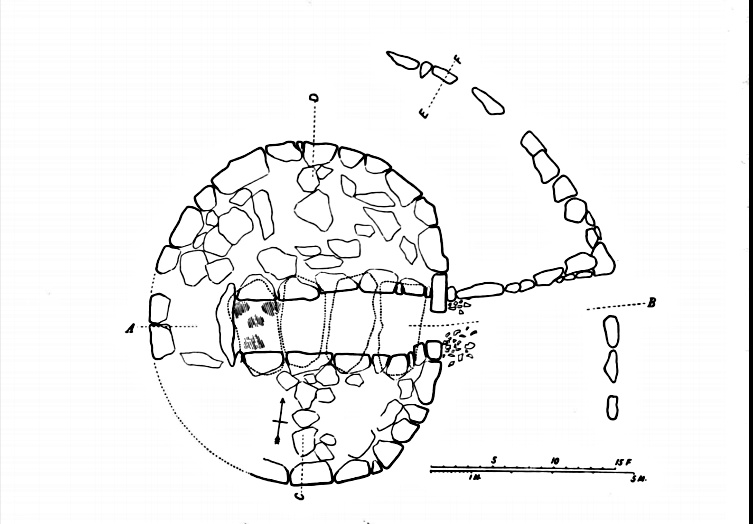
Bant's carn layout, Bonsor 1900

The tomb was excavated in 1900 by archaeologist, George Bonsor. Bonsor found the tomb empty except for cremated human remains at the back of the chamber, along with sherds of Neolithic and Bronze Age pottery. Later restoration work in 1970, led by P. Ashbee, included re-setting the tomb's eastern capstone and southern portal stone. This work uncovered 140 decorated prehistoric pottery fragments from around the portal stone as well as two worked flints which were given to the Isles of Scily Museum in December 1976.

Bonsor never published the results of his excavations on Scilly. In 1926 his friend and fellow archaeologist, Thomas Kendrick, then Assistant Keeper in the Department of British and Medieval Antiquities at the British Museum, visited Bonsor at his castle in Seville, Spain. He discovered that Bonsor had kept his notes, drawings and finds from his excavations on Scilly. Kendrick convinced Bonsor to send several of the excavation finds to the British Museum. After Bonsor's death, his excavation plans and drawings were obtained for the museum. The plans played an important part in the restoration of Bant's Carn in 1970.

The Bant's Carn site also includes remains of post-medieval field systems and other settlements. It, together with the nearby late Iron Age/Romano-British village of Halangy Down is now in the guardianship of English Heritage. A military battery built in 1905 also stands nearby.

== See also ==
- Innisidgen
- Obadiah's Barrow
- Porth Hellick Down
