= Porth Hellick Down =

Neolithic entrance grave on the Isles of Scilly

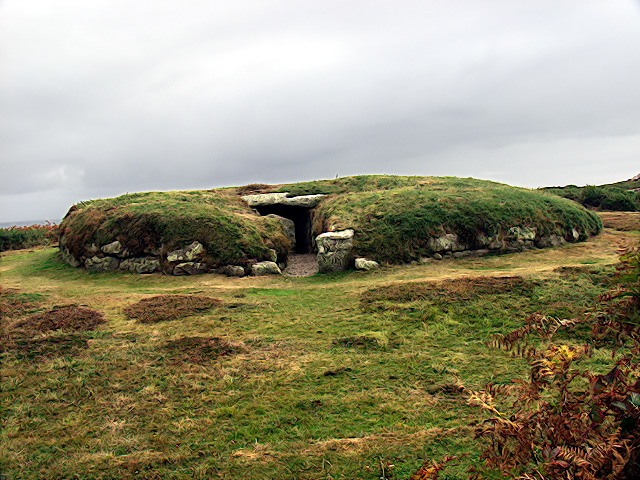
- The site in 2004

- Location in England, United Kingdom
- 49.91829°N 6.28113°W
- Type: Cemetery
- Location: England, United Kingdom

History
- Built: c. 1750 BC

Site notes
- Excavation dates: 1899
- Archaeologists: George Bonsor

Scheduled monument
- Official name: Porth Hellick Down
- Designated: 1975
- Reference no.: 304047

Porth Hellick Down is a Neolithic and Bronze Age archeological site located on the island of St Mary's, in the Isles of Scilly in Great Britain. The ancient burial monument encompasses a large cairn cemetery that includes at least six entrance graves, other unchambered cairns, and a prehistoric field system. The site is notable for having the largest assembly of surviving entrance graves.

== Site description ==
Porth Hellick Down is located on the island of St Mary's in the Isles of Scilly, overlooking Porth Hellick Bay. The Neolithic and Bronze Age monument encompasses a large cairn cemetery containing several burial cairns, including at least six entrance graves. It also includes an ancient linear boundary and a prehistoric field system, which stretches across the northern and north western section of the Down. It is the largest surviving group of entrance graves in the world.

=== The Great Tomb ===
The largest and best preserved entrance grave on the ancient site is a Bronze Age grave (2000-1500 BC) located on the northwestern slope of Porth Hellick Down. The burial monument is situated close to the boundary of a prehistoric field system. The site was excavated by the antiquarian, George Bonsor in 1899. He named the entrance grave, "The Great Tomb". Earlier unrecorded excavations at the site had left the burial chamber empty, except for a piece of pumice and a few remnants of late Bronze Age pottery fragments. Bonsor's excavation is the first excavation in Scilly to be recorded in detail.

The entrance grave sits on a low, circular platform. It consists of a mound that is 12.25 m in diameter and up to 1.6 m in height. The mound is retained by a kerb of large slabs. The burial chamber measures 3.5 m by 1.5 m wide and is 1 m high. The grave is roofed by four capstones, 2.5 m long and 1.25 m wide. The burial chamber is D-shaped with two sides that incline westwards to intersect the inner end of the passage. The entrance passage is uncovered. The Great Tomb was restored by the Ministry of Works, which included protecting the burial chamber with new turf. The restoration project damaged the tomb when they removed the grave's outer kerb. It is now in the care of English Heritage.

=== Selected monuments ===
The entrance grave that is positioned the furthest west on Porth Hellick Down is the grave known as the "coffin grave". The remains of the burial monument include part of the stone kerb and four capstones covering a coffin-shaped chamber. The mound contains a kerb of large stones, measuring 8.3 m by 8 m. The burial chamber is oriented east-west, with the entrance facing east. The chamber interior measures 7m by almost 1.5 m wide across the middle, with a boat or coffin-shaped layout, the sides curving in slightly to 1m wide at the western end and 65 cm wide at the entrance. The entrance is partially blocked. The chamber walls are lined with stone slabs. Four capstones make up the chamber roof. The chamber of this entrance grave is considered to be an excellent example of a coffin or boat-shaped chamber.

One of the entrance graves on Porth Hellick Down has a burial chamber that is constructed along a massive rock outcrop. The rock is integrated into the grave's structure. The burial chamber consists of a circular mound of stacked rubble, 13 m in diameter and 1m high. The southern end of the chamber is lined with large slabs on its west side and a large boulder on the east side. Another large slab sits on the slab walls and provides a roof for the chamber. This grave has survived mostly intact, retaining its original form and layout. It has lost one of its capstones. The incorporation of natural rock outcropping into the grave's structure is an unusual feature of a Scillonian entrance grave.

Porth Hellick Down is the site of a prehistoric linear boundary which traverses its eastern slope. The linear boundary progresses as a nearly straight line of small upright stones, up to 50 cm high and 1.5 m to 6 m apart. Beginning at the eastern edge of the Down, the linear boundary stretches southeast to northwest for 17 m, and then continues for another 23 m. The boundary measures up to 1m wide, 10 cm high and is mainly covered by heather turf. Not typically found in prehistoric Britain, The Isles of Scilly is the setting for a number of linear boundaries that are directly associated with groupings of prehistoric burial monuments.

== See also ==
- Bant's Carn
- Innisidgen
- Obadiah's Barrow

== Gallery ==
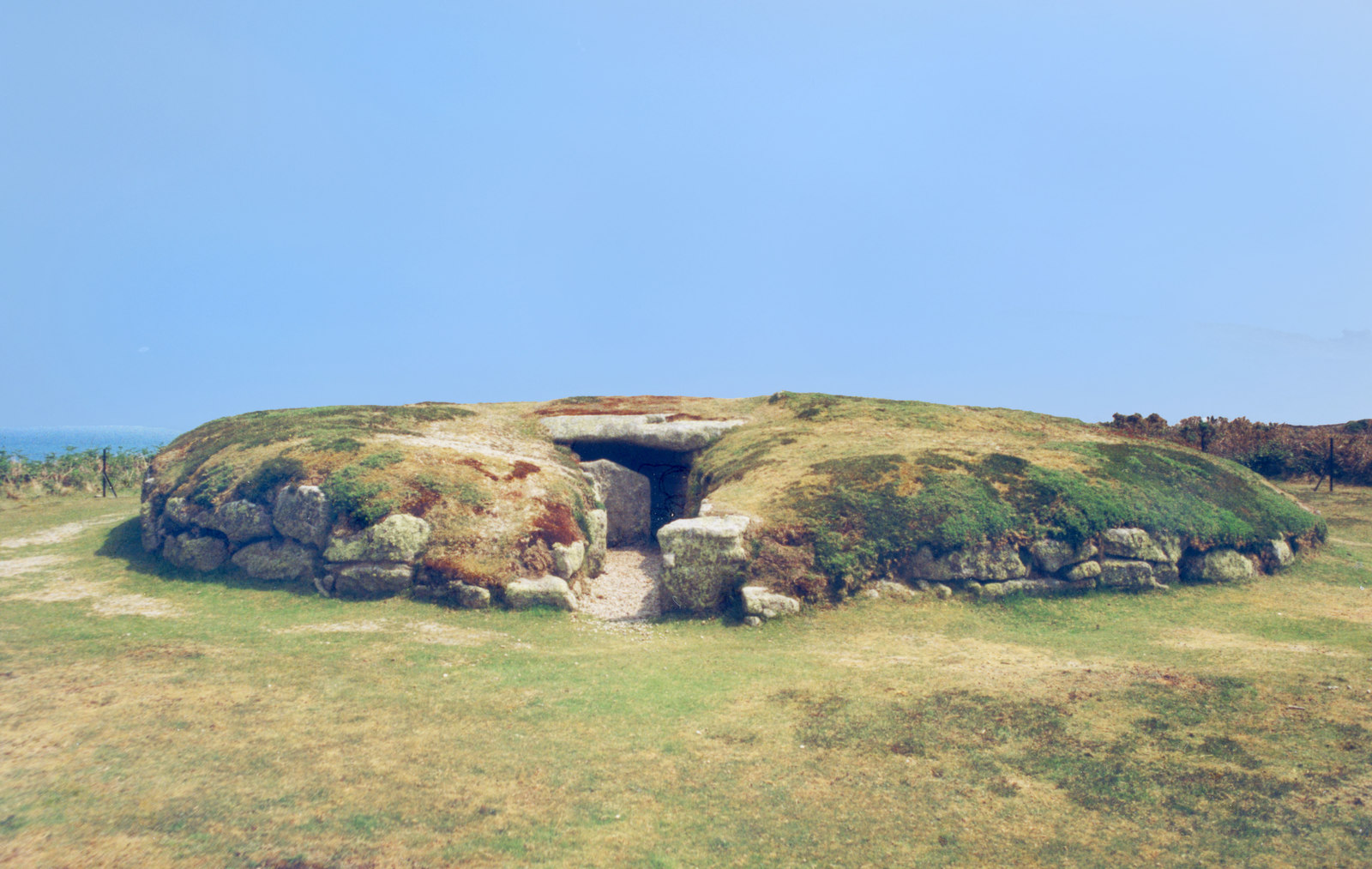
View of the Great Tomb, Porth Hellick Down

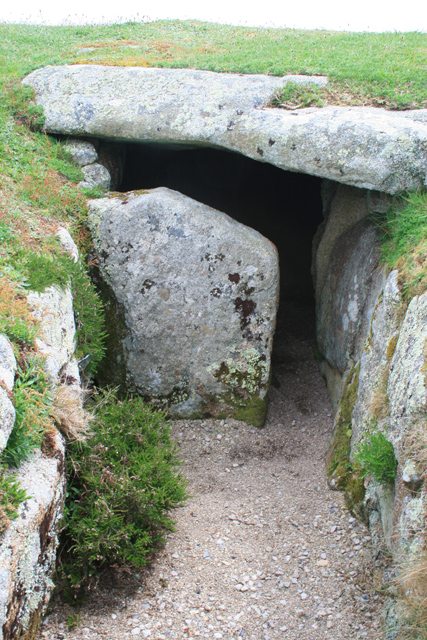
Great Tomb entrance, Porth Hellick Down

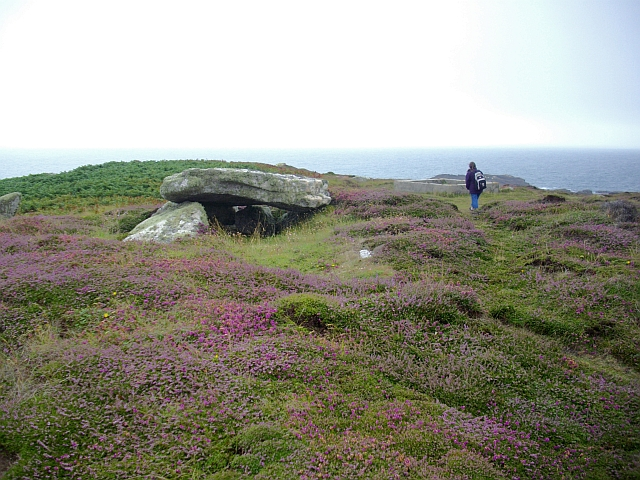
Chambered grave, Porth Hellick Down
