= Obadiah's Barrow =

Neolithic entrance grave on the Isles of Scilly

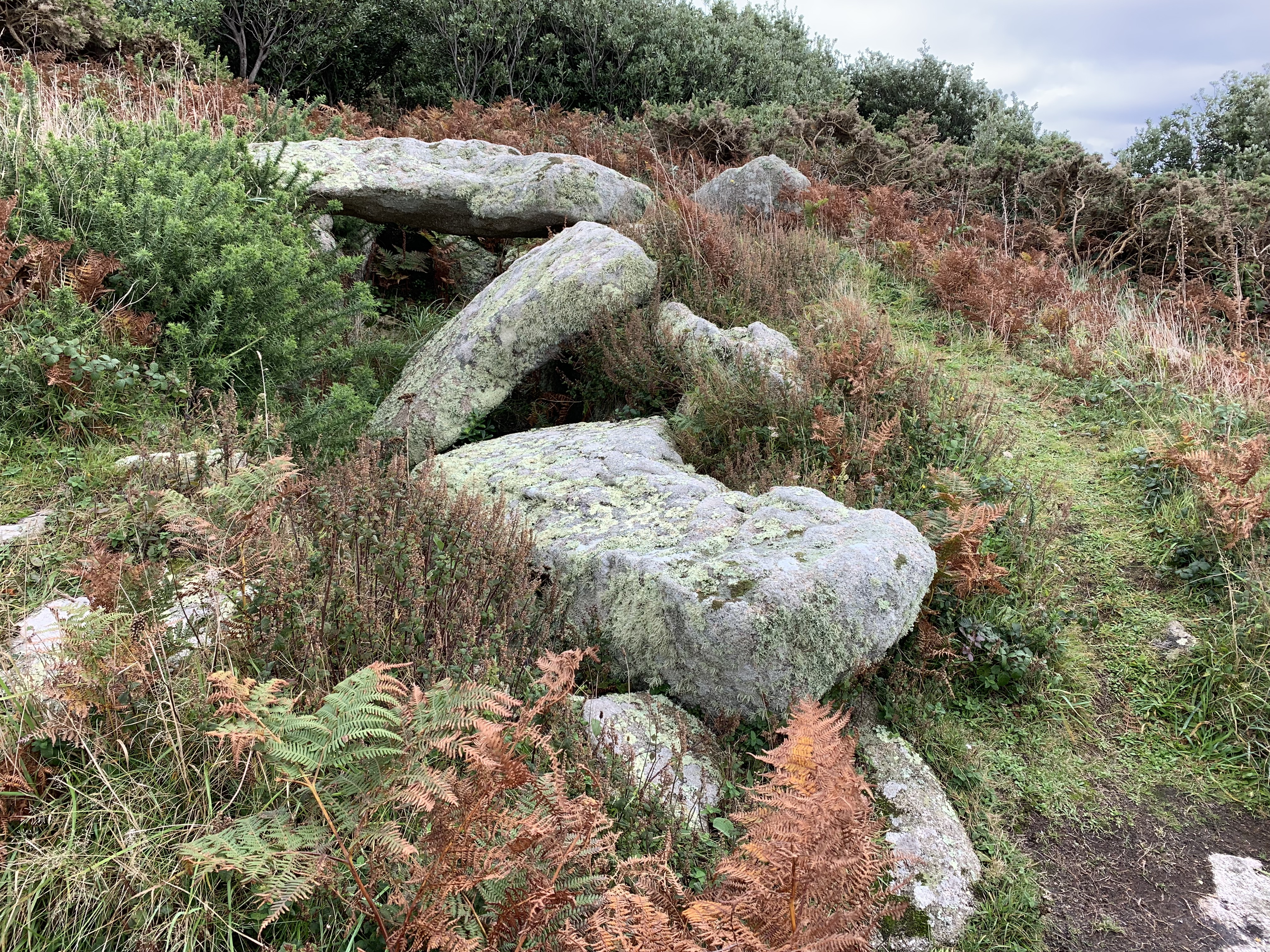
- The site in 2019

- Location in England, United Kingdom
- 49.895594°N 6.334838°W
- Type: Burial chamber
- Location: England, United Kingdom

History
- Built: c. 1750 BC

Site notes
- Material: Stone
- Height: 60 cm (24 in)

Scheduled monument
- Official name: Obadiah's Barrow
- Reference no.: 303188

Obadiah's Barrow or Obadiah's Grave is a Neolithic entrance grave located on the island of Gugh in the Isles of Scilly. The grave sits on a steep slope on the southwestern side of Kittern Hill, the highest point on Gugh. The grave was excavated in 1901 by British archaeologist, George Bonsor.

== Description ==
Obadiah's barrow is a Neolithic entrance grave, 22 ft (7m) in diameter and 2 ft (60 cm) in height. It is located on Gugh, one of six inhabited islands in the Isles of Scilly. The grave is found on the southwestern side of Kittern Hill, the northernmost hill and highest point on the island. Kittern Hill is the site of several burial cairns, including five entrance graves. The largest entrance grave on Gugh is Obadiah's Barrow, also known as Obadiah's grave.

Obadia's barrow consists of a predominantly circular mound, approximately 33 ft (10m) in diameter and 4.92 ft (1.5m) high. The grave has a short passage leading to an inner chamber, which measures 17 ft (5.2m) long by 4.6 ft (1.4m) wide. The chamber's walls are 3.6 ft high (1.1m), with stone slabs along the base. There are four visible covering slabs that lie across the top of the chamber, two have fallen and lie partly in the chamber. The chamber entrance is partially blocked by large edge-set stones.

== History ==
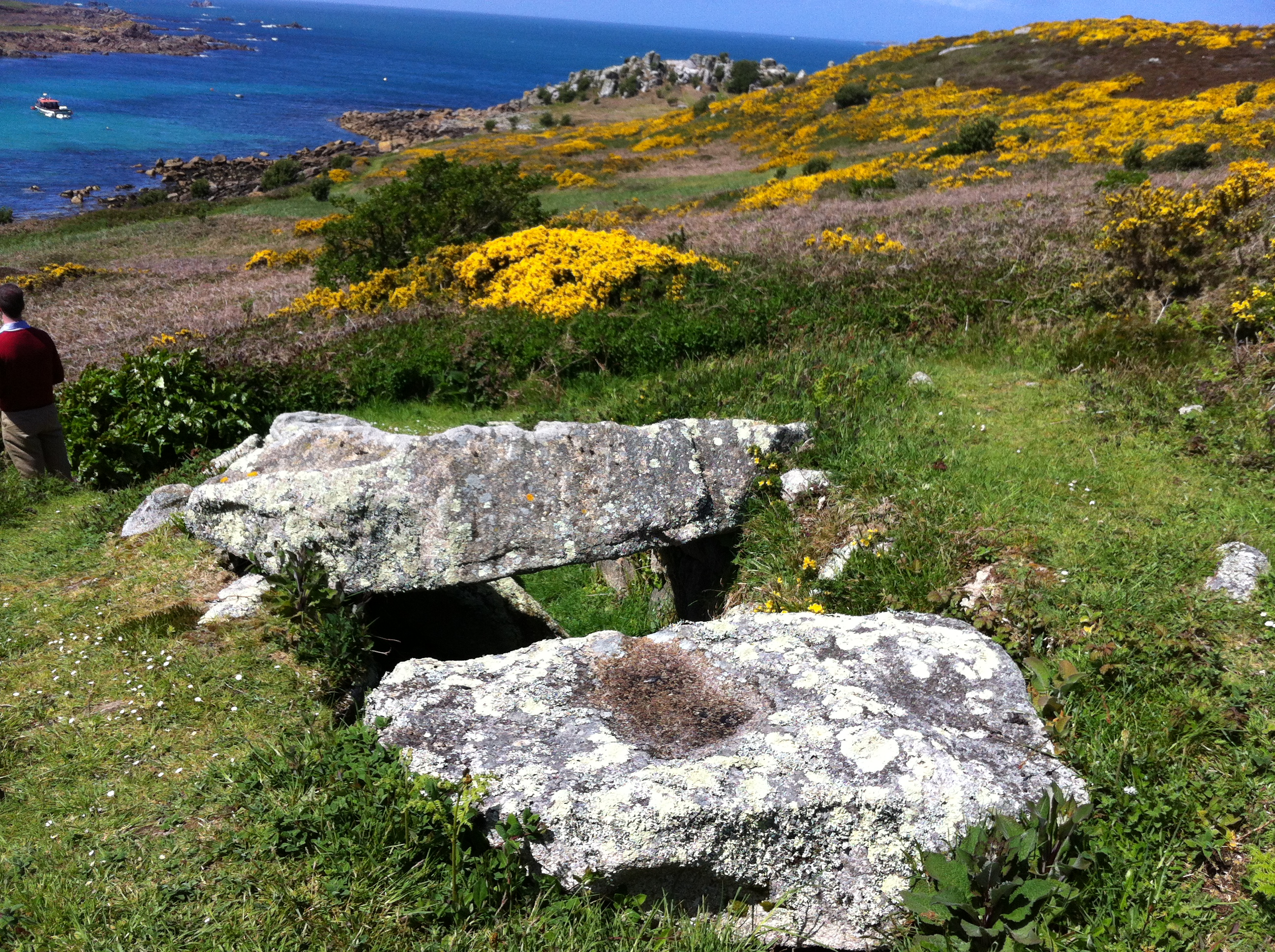
Obadiah's grave, view west-northwest

The Isles of Scilly were originally settled during the Neolithic era, around 2500 BC. Burial monuments on the islands range in date from the later Neolithic period to the Middle Bronze Age (c.2500-1000 BC). Over 80 entrance graves have been recorded on the isles of Scilly. Entrance graves are distinguished by their burial chamber, typically constructed with edge-set slabs, coursed rubble walling or both, and roofed by large covering slabs. The chamber is usually accessible through an opening in the mound's stone outer edge. Excavations of entrance graves have generally uncovered cremation urns, pottery fragments and cremated and unburnt human bones.

Obadiah's grave was excavated in 1901 by British archaeologist George Bonsor, who discovered a crouching male skeleton in the middle of the chamber and a Bronze Age cremation urn and several cremation urn fragments. Near the entrance to the chamber, Bonsor uncovered a bronze awl, more urn fragments and cremated and unburnt bones. The grave was named for Obadiah Hicks, a farmer who lived on St. Agnes at the time of the excavation. Bonsor lodged with Hicks and named the burial monument after him. Bonsor's surviving plans, drawings and sections of the grave have provided a very detailed record of the entrance grave's chamber and archaeological finds.

== See also ==
- Bant's Carn
- Innisidgen
- Tregiffian Burial Chamber
