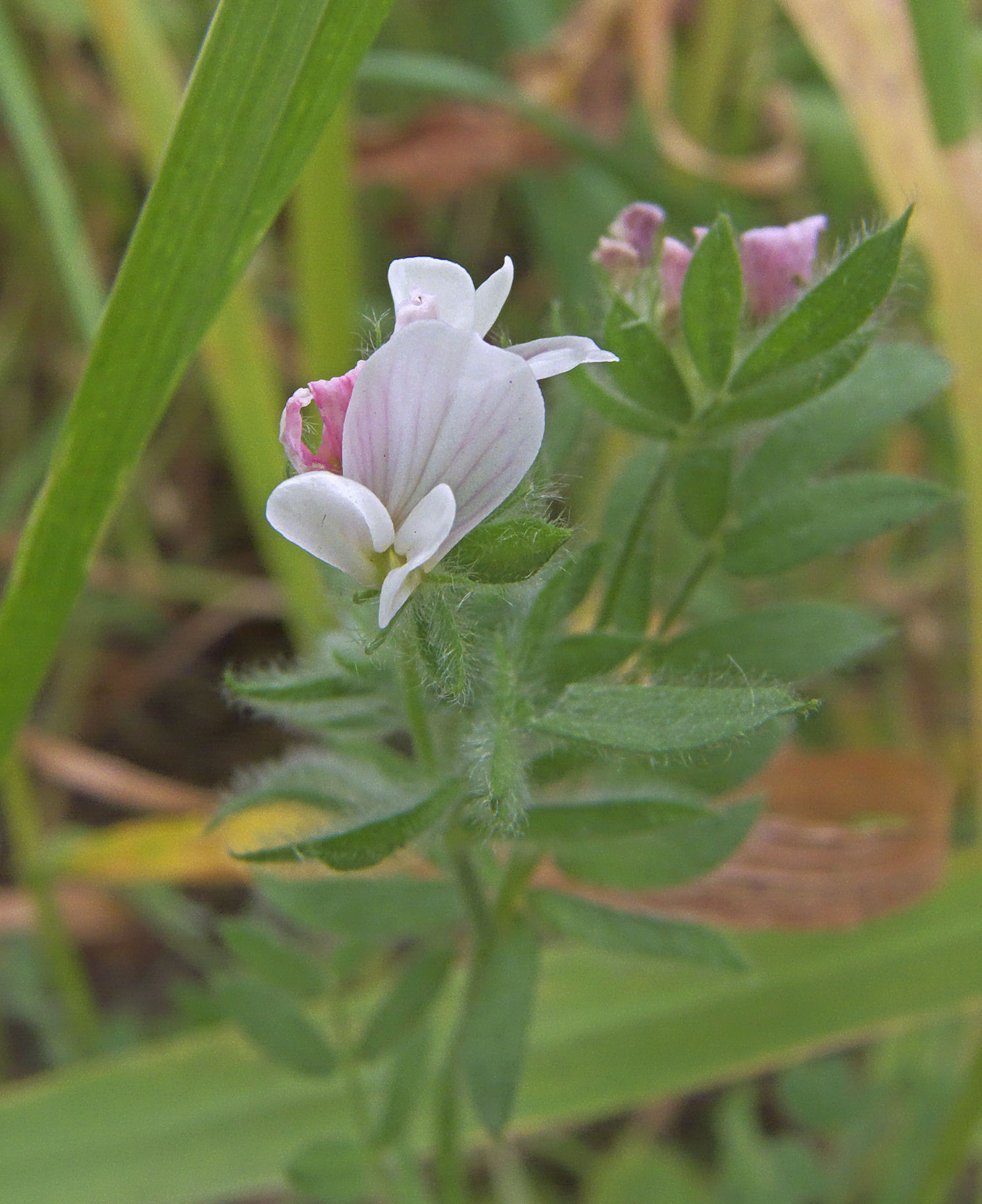
- In bloom
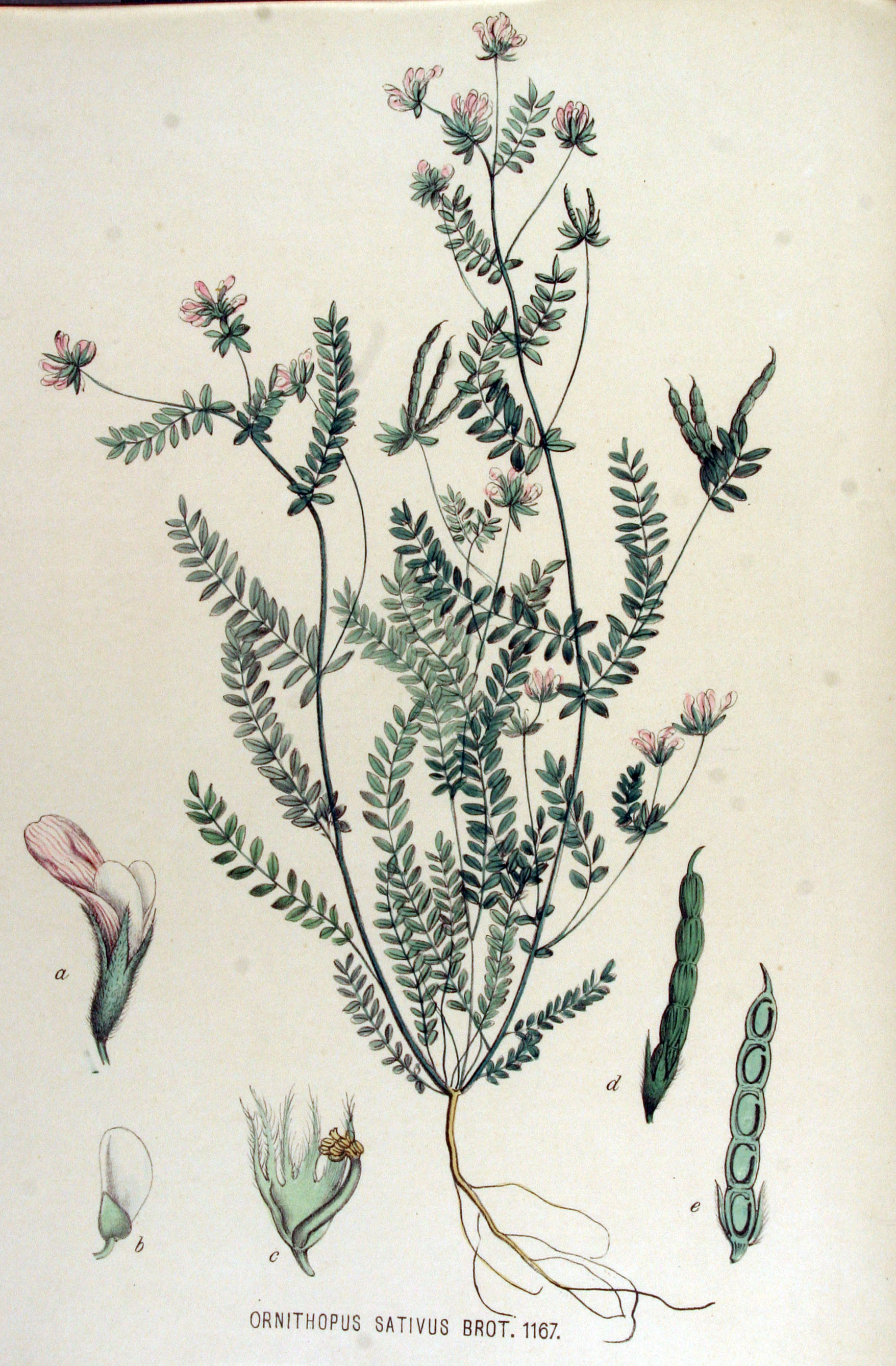
- Botanical illustration

Scientific classification
- Kingdom: Plantae
- Clade: Tracheophytes
- Clade: Angiosperms
- Clade: Eudicots
- Clade: Rosids
- Order: Fabales
- Family: Fabaceae
- Subfamily: Faboideae
- Genus: Ornithopus
- Species: O. sativus

Binomial name
- Ornithopus sativus Brot.

Synonyms
- List: Coronilla serradella E.H.L.Krause; Ornithopodium sativum (Brot.) Kuntze; Ornithopus × macrorrhynchus (Willk.) Klink. & O.Schwarz; Ornithopus monocarpus Sennen & Elías; Ornithopus roseus Dufour; Ornithopus sativus subsp. roseus (Dufour) Alsina

= Ornithopus sativus =

Species of flowering plant

Ornithopus sativus, the serradella, pink serradella or common birdsfoot, is a species of flowering plant in the family Fabaceae. It is native to Southwestern Europe and Northwest Africa in Portugal, western Spain, northern Morocco and Algeria, and southwestern France and has been introduced as a legume forage to many locations around the world, including most of central and eastern Europe, Turkey, the Caucasus, the Azores, South Africa, Kenya, Java, most of Australia, the North Island of New Zealand, southern Chile, and California. It is known for producing a high‑quality forage in highly acidic, nutrient‑poor soils. Its name derives from the birdsfoot-shaped cluster of pods.

== Subtaxa ==
The following subtaxa are accepted:

- Ornithopus sativus nothosubsp. macrorrhynchus (Willk.) Talavera, Arista & P.L.Ortiz
- Ornithopus sativus subsp. sativus
