= Lower and Higher Longbeak barrows =

- Porth an Men krug (Cornish)
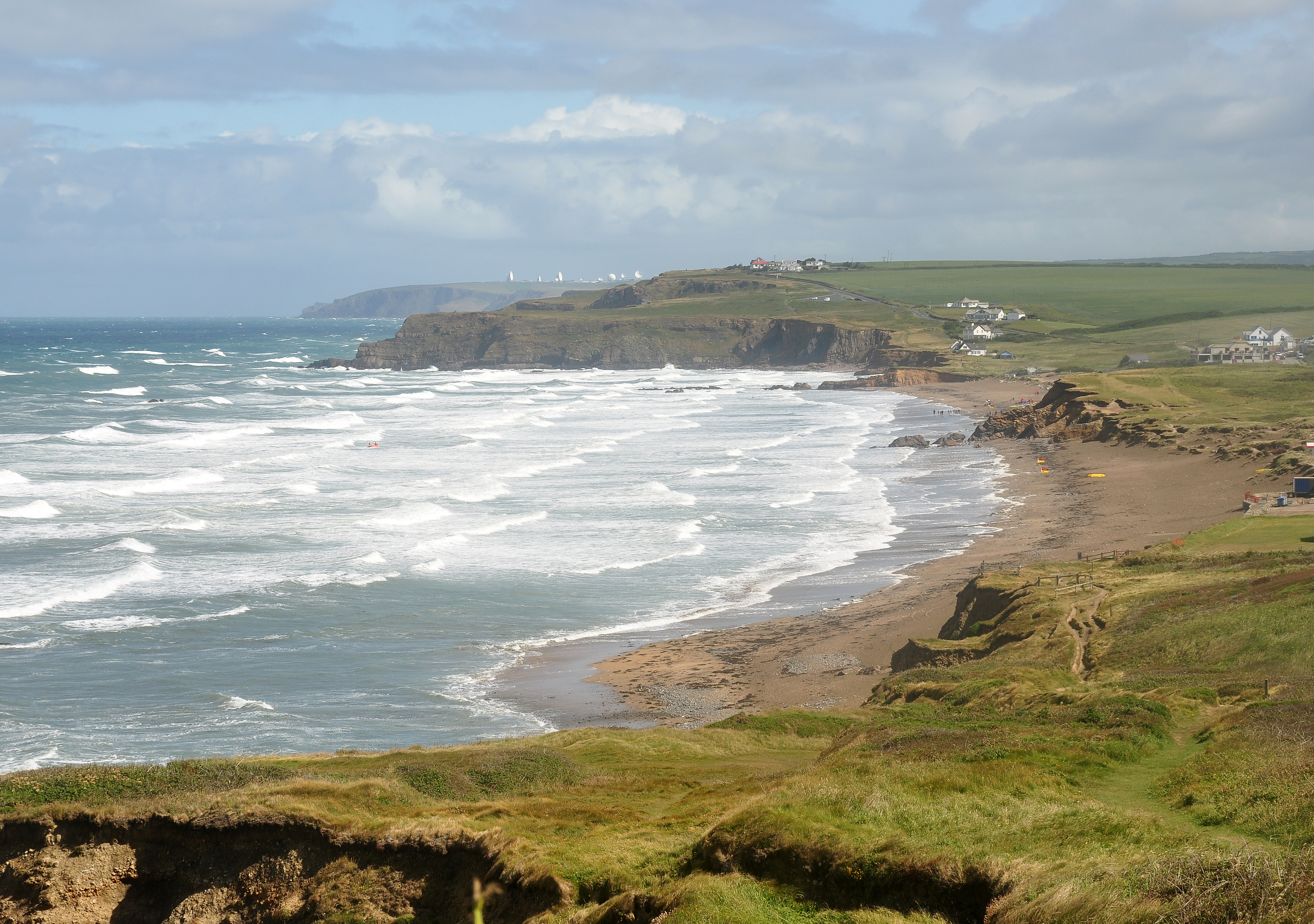
- The barrows are located on the far headland, this photo shows Widemouth bay.

- Location within Cornwall
- 50°48′21″N 4°33′23″W
- Type: Barrow
- Location: Widemouth Bay, Cornwall, United Kingdom
- OS grid reference: SS19950389

History
- Built: Early Bronze Age

Site notes
- Area: North Cornwall
- Architectural style: Ancient
- Governing body: Historic England
- Owner: Cornwall Council

Scheduled monument
- Official name: Two bowl barrows, one 220m east of Lower Longbeak and the other 320m east of Higher Longbeak
- Designated: 1977
- Reference no.: 1001723

The Lower and Higher Longbeak barrows (also known as the Widemouth Bay tumulus) are a scheduled monument located north of Widemouth Bay in Cornwall. The two round barrows are Bronze Age funerary monuments, built in the period between 2400–1500 BC.

They are designated as "two bowl barrows, one 220m east of Lower Longbeak and the other 320m east of Higher Longbeak" by Historic England. According to a field survey in 1977, "The southern mound measures 14m in diameter and is 1.1m high. It is steep-sided with a central hollow, possibly the result of antiquarian excavation although no details are known. The barrow has views across Widemouth Sand. The northern barrow mound is 16m in diameter and 0.7m high".

They are protected under the Ancient Monuments and Archaeological Areas Act 1979.

== See also ==
- Scheduled monuments in Cornwall
