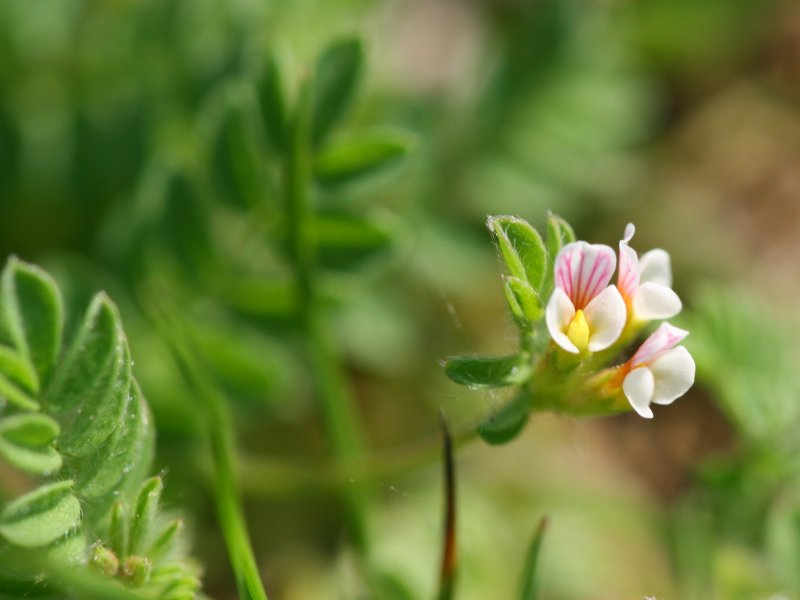
- Ornithopus perpusillus

Scientific classification
- Kingdom: Plantae
- Clade: Tracheophytes
- Clade: Angiosperms
- Clade: Eudicots
- Clade: Rosids
- Order: Fabales
- Family: Fabaceae
- Subfamily: Faboideae
- Tribe: Loteae
- Genus: Ornithopus; L. (1753)

Species
- See text

Synonyms
- Ornithopodium Mill. (1754)

= Ornithopus =

Genus of legumes

Ornithopus, the bird's-foot, is a genus of flowering plants in the legume family, Fabaceae. It includes six species and one natural hybrid native to Europe, Macaronesia, the eastern Mediterranean, northwest Africa, and Iran, and from southern Brazil to northeastern Argentina in South America.

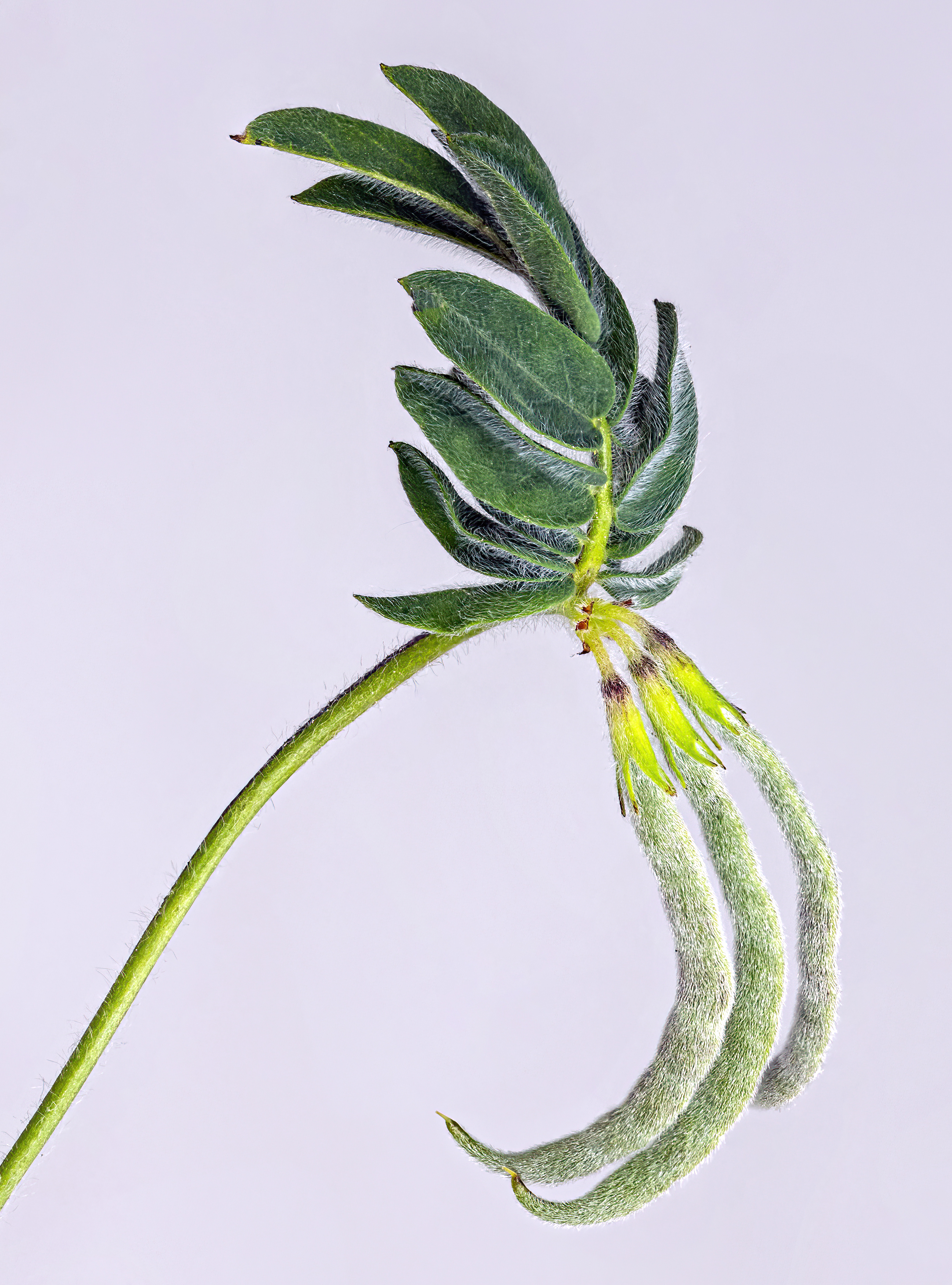
Appearance of the fruits which gave the name to the genus

- Ornithopus × bardiei Jeanj.
- Ornithopus compressus L. — yellow serradella
- Ornithopus micranthus (Benth.) Arechav.
- Ornithopus perpusillus L. — little white bird's foot
- Ornithopus pinnatus (Mill.) Druce — orange bird's foot
- Ornithopus sativus Brot. — serradella, common bird's foot
- Ornithopus uncinatus Maire & Sam.
