= Trenoweth, Isles of Scilly =

Coordinates: 49.932°N 6.296°W

Trenoweth: Cornish: Trenowydh
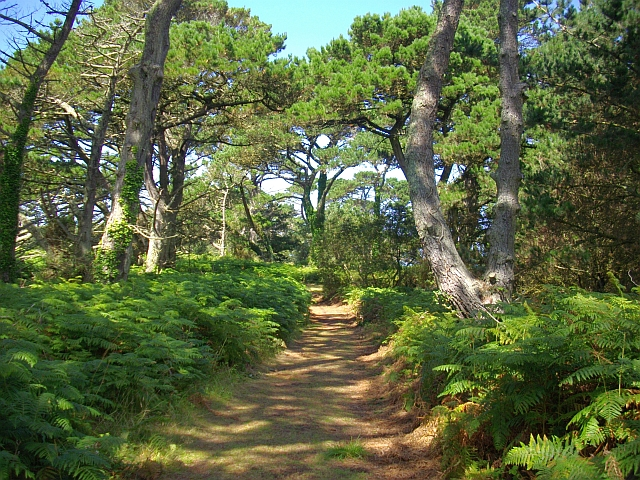
- The track through the pine trees, leading from Trenoweth to Innisidgen

- Location within Isles of Scilly
- Unitary authority: Isles of Scilly
- Ceremonial county: Cornwall
- Region: South West
- Country: England
- Sovereign state: United Kingdom
- Post town: ISLES OF SCILLY
- Postcode district: TR21
- Dialling code: 01720
- Police: Devon and Cornwall
- Fire: Isles of Scilly
- Ambulance: South Western
- UK Parliament: St Ives

Trenoweth (/trəˈnaʊəθ/) (Cornish: Trenowydh, meaning new town) is a small settlement, located in the north of the island of St Mary's in the Isles of Scilly, Cornwall, England.

It is situated in an inland and rural part of the island, northwest of Maypole (via Watermill and Borough) and east of Telegraph (via Pungie's Lane). Also nearby, to the northeast, is Innisidgen, a prehistoric site on the coast.

The Isles of Scilly Wildlife Trust are based in Trenoweth.

Local industries centre on the cut flower industry, and Trenoweth has related warehousing and a shop (Trenoweth Flowers). There is also a field used for outdoor boat storage (particularly during winter). Otherwise the settlement consists of agricultural buildings and houses.

There was once a distinction between Higher Trenoweth and Lower Trenoweth, however Lower Trenoweth has become a single dwelling named Bristow unconnected with (Higher) Trenoweth and no longer bears the name Trenoweth in its address.
