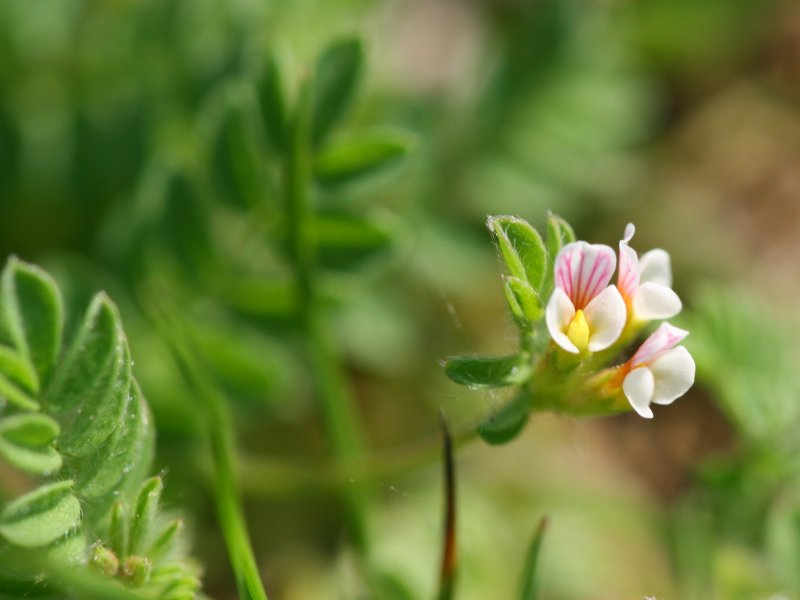

Scientific classification
- Kingdom: Plantae
- Clade: Tracheophytes
- Clade: Angiosperms
- Clade: Eudicots
- Clade: Rosids
- Order: Fabales
- Family: Fabaceae
- Subfamily: Faboideae
- Genus: Ornithopus
- Species: O. perpusillus

Binomial name
- Ornithopus perpusillus L.

= Ornithopus perpusillus =

Species of legume

Ornithopus perpusillus or little white bird's-foot, is a plant species of the genus Ornithopus.
