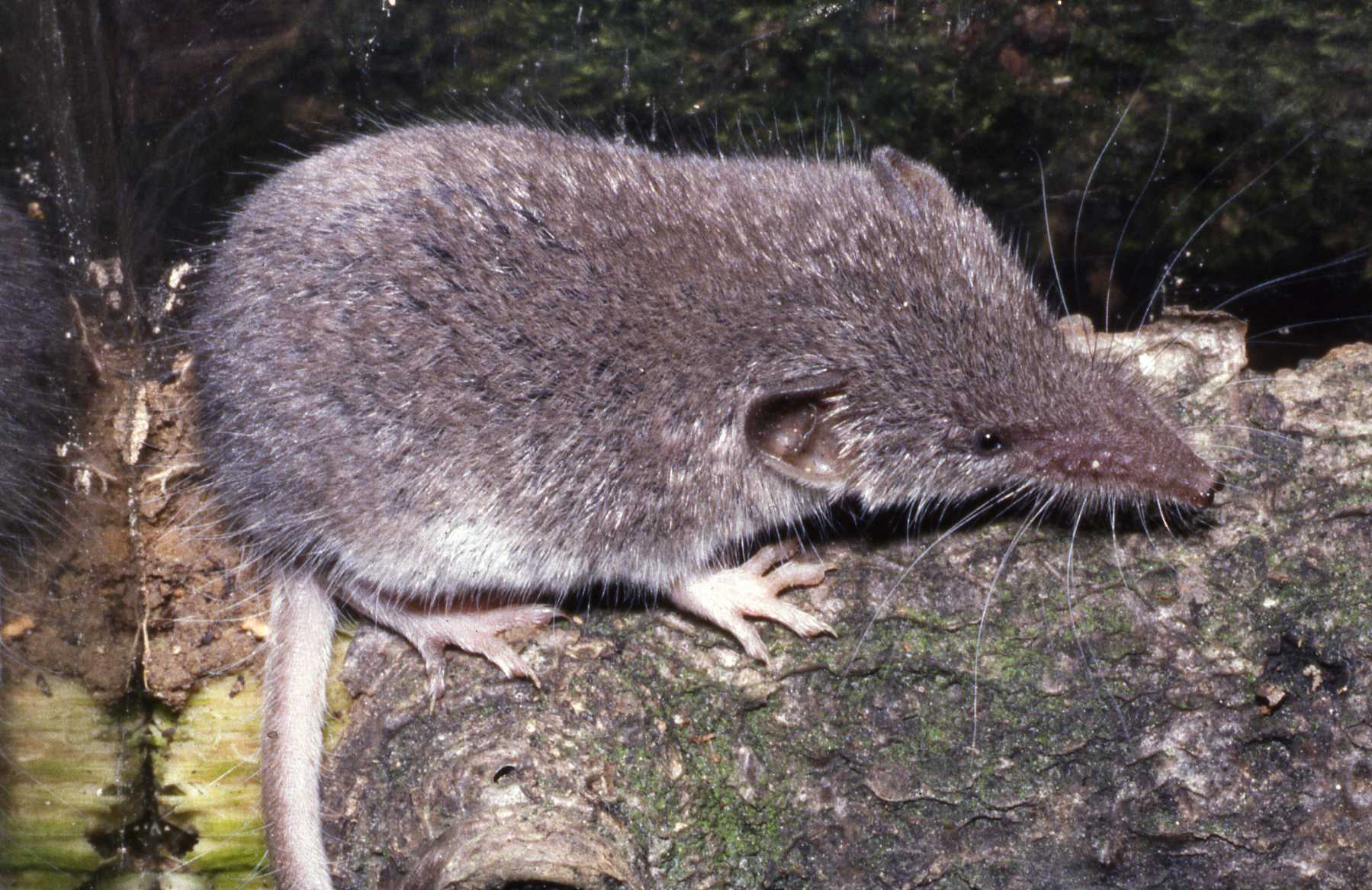

Conservation status
- Least Concern (IUCN 3.1)

Scientific classification
- Kingdom: Animalia
- Phylum: Chordata
- Class: Mammalia
- Order: Eulipotyphla
- Family: Soricidae
- Genus: Crocidura
- Species: C. suaveolens

Binomial name
- Crocidura suaveolens (Pallas, 1811)
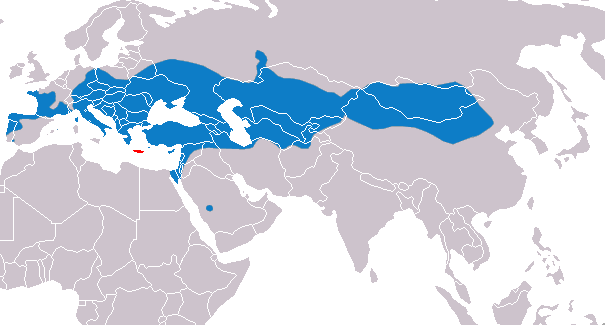
- Lesser white-toothed shrew range

= Lesser white-toothed shrew =

Species of mammal

The lesser white-toothed shrew (Crocidura suaveolens) is a small species of shrew with a widespread distribution in Africa, Asia and Europe. Its preferred habitat is scrub and gardens and it feeds on insects, arachnids, worms, gastropods, newts and small rodents, though its diet usually varies according to the biotope where it lives. The closely related Asian lesser white-toothed shrew (Crocidura shantungensis) was once included in this species, but is now considered to be a separate species.

Like the common shrew, a female lesser white-toothed shrew and her young may form a "caravan" when foraging for food or seeking a place of safety; each shrew grips the tail of the shrew in front so that the group stays together.

== Distribution and habitat ==
The lesser white-toothed shrew occurs widely from France and Portugal, in the west, across Europe and Asia to Japan and also in North Africa. It prefers dry ground, including scrub and gardens, and on the Isles of Scilly inhabits also shingle beaches and sand dunes.

The populations in the Isles of Scilly and in the Channel Islands of Jersey and Sark off the French coast are isolated. The lesser white-toothed shrew subspecies Crocidura suaveolens balearica lives on Menorca, one of the Balearic Islands.

== The Scilly shrew ==
The population found on the Isles of Scilly, off the south-west coast of England, was once thought to be a sub-species, Crocidura suaveolens cassiteridum, and is known as the Scilly shrew. Skull and tooth measurements of individuals from Scilly are found to be intermediate in size of those in the Channel Islands and the darker fur of the Scilly specimens is not considered a valid reason for the naming of a sub-species. It is unusual in that it can be found on the islands' beaches, where it feeds almost exclusively on amphipods. The Scillonian name for the animal is "teak" or "teke".

Archaeological remains indicate that it was present on the islands in the bronze Age, so it may have been present before the Isles of Scilly became separated from the European continent, or may have migrated from the Channel Islands or Europe on board ships. Although if shrews had survived through the last glaciation or the Younger Dryas, it would seem that northerly distributed species such as Sorex araneus would have been more likely to survive, rather than a southerly distributed species such as Crocidura suaveolens.

In July 1924 W N Blair found an unknown species of shrew on Gugh and sent it to the mammal expert, Mr Hinton, at the British Museum. This specimen, held at the museum, is the type for the species. Ten years earlier H N Robinson found an unknown rodent at Old Town St Mary's and sent it to Mr F W Smalley "who had the largest collection of rodents in the country". In 2010, a Scilly shrew made headlines on BBC Cornwall when it stowed away on the passenger ferry RMV Scillonian III. It was only discovered as the ship was about to arrive in Penzance. The shrew was flown back to the Isles of Scilly the next day on a Skybus plane and then released back into its natural environment.
