= Isles of Scilly Wildlife Trust =

Environmental organisation

- Formation: 1985; 41 years ago
- Type: Registered Charity
- Headquarters: Trenoweth
- Location: St Mary's, Isles of Scilly
- Chief Executive: Julian Branscombe
- Website: Isles of Scilly Wildlife Trust

The Isles of Scilly Wildlife Trust, formed in 1985, is a Wildlife Trust covering the Isles of Scilly, a group of islands off the coast of Cornwall. It became the 46th member of The Wildlife Trusts in 2001 and is dedicated to ensuring that the archaeological and historical remains on the islands, as well as the flora and fauna, are protected and maintained. Since September 2021, the Chief Executive of the trust has been Julian Branscombe.

The Isles of Scilly Wildlife Trust, a small, local independent charity, leases all of the uninhabited islands, islets, and rocks and much of the formerly "untenanted land" (including almost all the coast) on the inhabited islands from the Duchy of Cornwall for a peppercorn rent of one daffodil per year. As tenants of the Duchy of Cornwall, the Isles of Scilly Wildlife Trust has a 99 year fully insuring, repairing lease and is responsible for more than 50% of the Islands. The Trust previously worked in conjunction with the Cornwall Wildlife Trust and jointly produced a thrice-yearly magazine called Wild Cornwall & Wild Scilly which ended in the Summer 2014 edition. Members are now sent an e-newsletter.

== Isles of Scilly Seabird Recovery Project ==
In 2013, the Isles of Scilly Seabird Recovery Project was set up by the Duchy of Cornwall, the Royal Society for the Protection of Birds (RSPB), Natural England, the Isles of Scilly Area of Outstanding Natural Beauty and the Isles of Scilly Wildlife Trust. The five-year project aims to keep the islands of St Agnes and Gugh brown rat (Rattus norvegicus) free to help breed seabirds, which lost 25% of their populations between 1983 and 2006. The rats eat eggs and kill the chicks of those birds that nest in burrows or on the ground. Rat removal began in October 2013 by a team of thirty volunteers led by Wildlife Management International Limited (WMIL) of New Zealand, and there have been no signs of rats on St. Agnes and Gugh since December 2013. WMIL returned to the islands to do a final check for rats in 2016.

In 2014, the Manx shearwater (Puffinus puffinus) bred on both Gugh and St. Agnes for the first time in living memory, and a survey of St. Agnes in July 2015 found the European storm petrel (Hydrobates pelagicus) at six nests. A follow-up in early September to confirm breeding found storm petrel chicks at each of the sites. Storm petrels also bred on Gugh in 2015.

== See also ==
- The Wildlife Trusts
