= Tregiffian Burial Chamber =

Archaeological site in Cornwall County, England

- Hirvedh Treguhyon
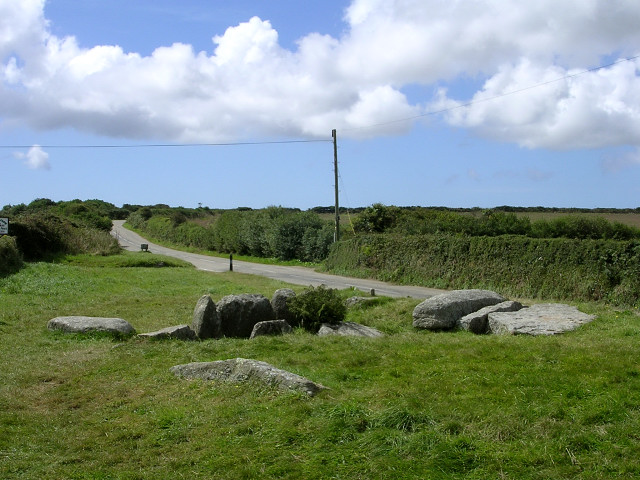
- The chambered cairn in 2005
- Interactive map of Tregiffian Burial Chamber
- 50°03′52″N 5°35′30″W
- Type: Chambered cairn
- Location: Lamorna, Cornwall

History
- Built: c. 1900 BC

Site notes
- Material: Stone
- Owner: English Heritage

The Tregiffian Burial Chamber (Cornish: Hirvedh Treguhyon) is a Neolithic or early Bronze Age chambered cairn. It is near Lamorna in west Cornwall, United Kingdom (grid reference SW430244). It is a rare form of a passage grave, known as an Entrance grave. It has an entrance passage, lined with stone slabs, which leads into a central chamber. This type of tomb is also found in the neighbouring Isles of Scilly.

== Location ==
Tregiffian is in southwest Cornwall in the District of Penwith south of Penzance between St Buryan and Lamorna. It lies close to The Merry Maidens stone circle. The site is managed by the Cornwall Heritage Trust on behalf of English Heritage.

== Construction ==
The large stone grave, half of which was covered by a road in 1846 was, unlike Cornish quoits, for the most part covered with soil, with only the entrance exposed. From the edge of the site a passage, covered by four 3 meter long stones, led to the 4-metre deep grave chamber. In front of the chamber, a cross-lying ornate stone, with cup-and-ring markings, formed a barrier. The original stone is in Truro, in the Royal Cornwall Museum, the local stone is a replica. Inside the tomb there was the chamber grave, which consisted of upright stones and a cover slab. Tregiffian probably formed a holy place with the Merry Maidens and other sites.

== Excavations ==
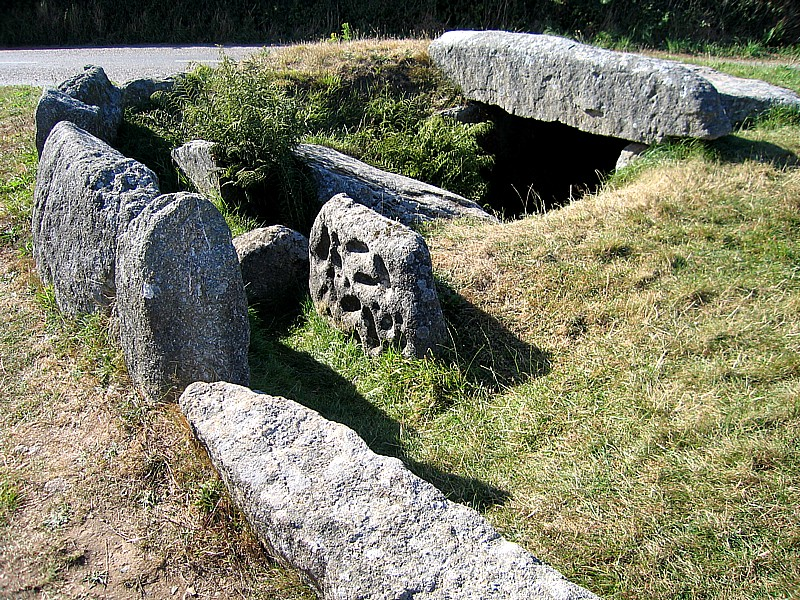
Tregiffian Burial Chamber

In 1871, William Borlase carried out the first excavations on the grave. He first discovered the stone edge of the cover and found flints, bones and ashes. During deeper excavations Borlase discovered pits with bone remains, which suggested cremation. In 1932, Hencken noted for the first time that it was probably a variant of a Megalithic grave and placed this grave type temporally between the dolmen and the cist type. Newer research recognized passage tombs as a variant of the dolmen type, notable particularly by the entrance to the interior. Urns were discovered in comprehensive excavations in the years 1968 and 1972, and the contents were dated to roughly 1900 BC. The occurrence of these two forms of burial is typical of an Entrance grave and suggests its use as a community grave for a long period of time.
