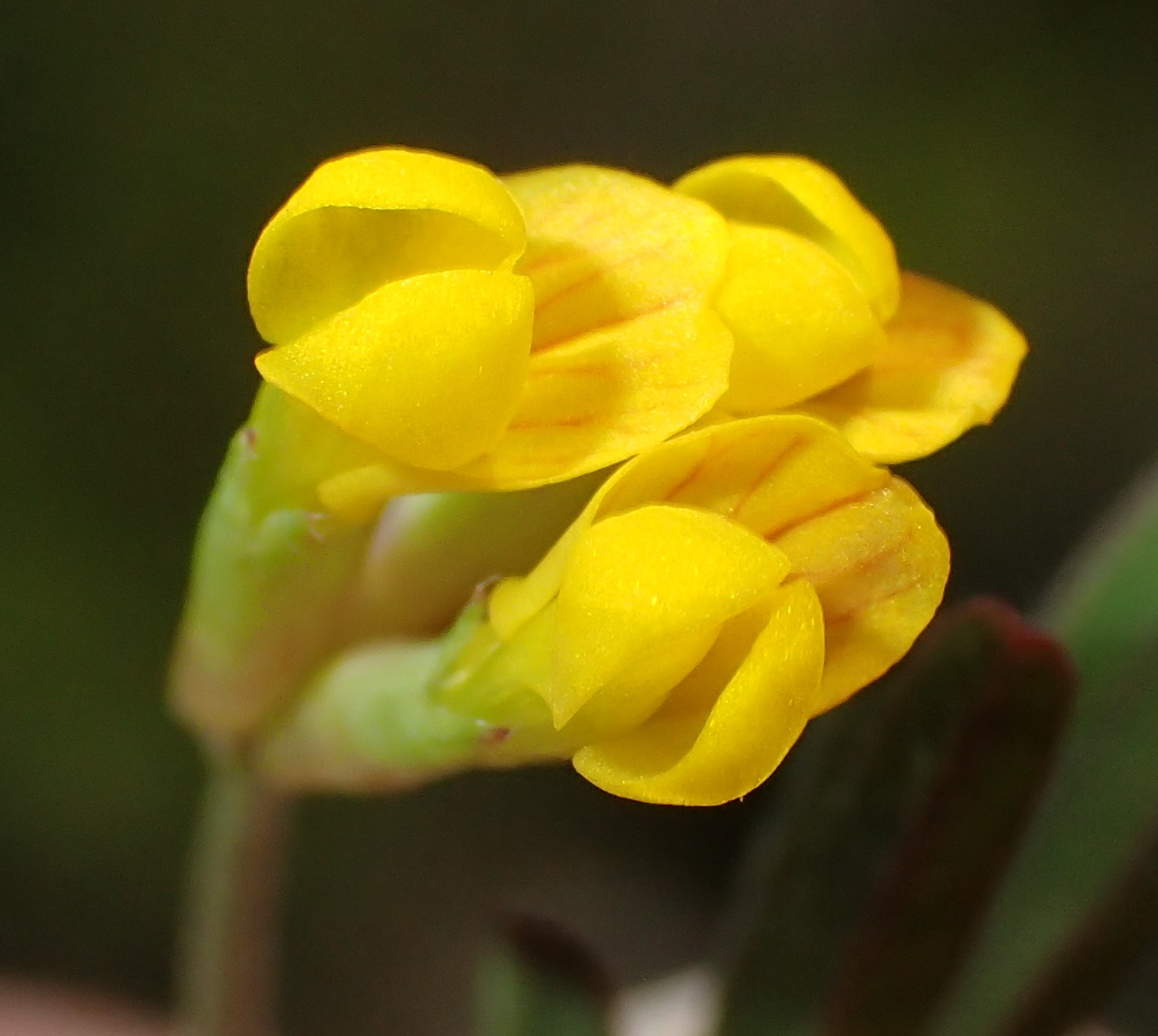

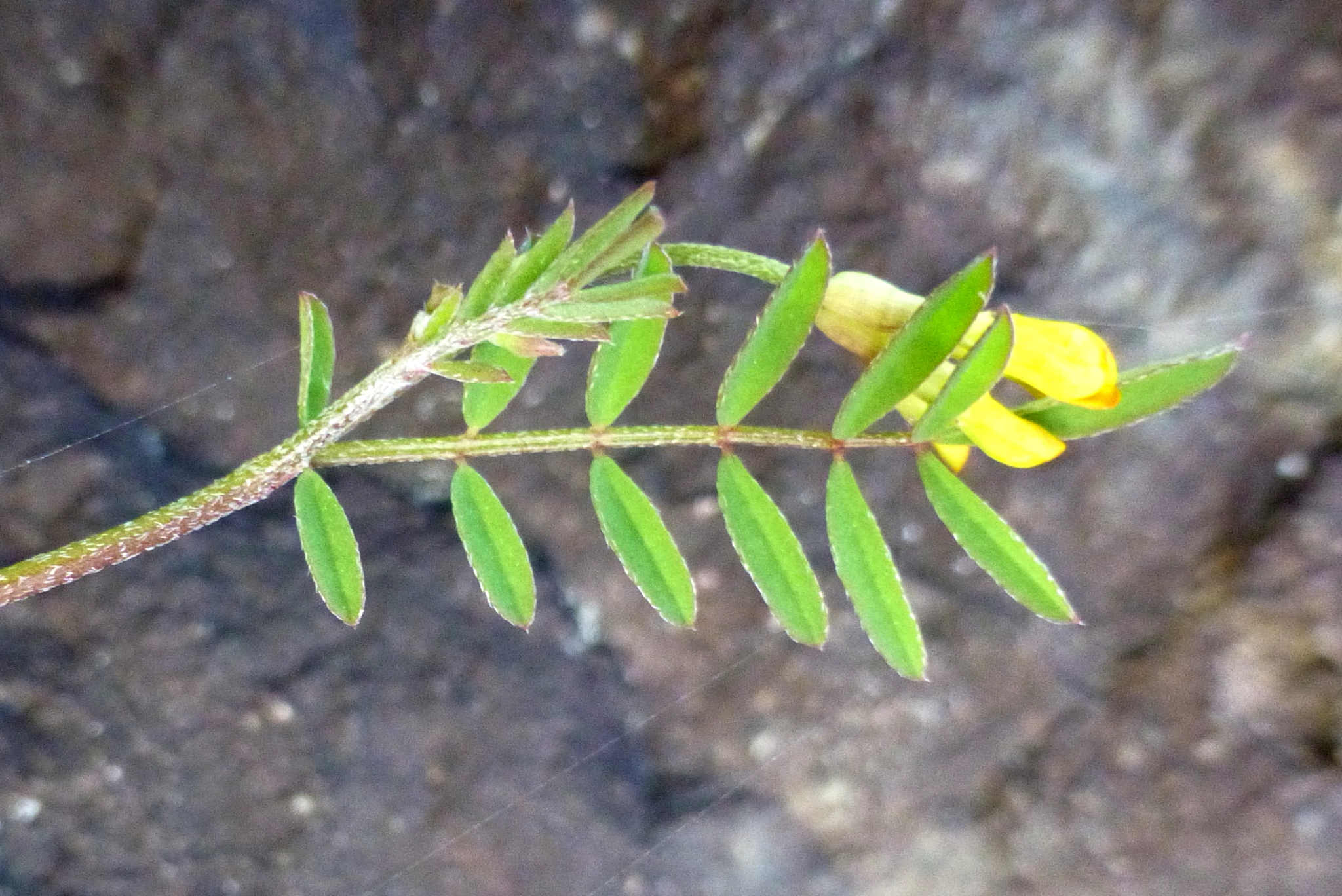

Scientific classification
- Kingdom: Plantae
- Clade: Tracheophytes
- Clade: Angiosperms
- Clade: Eudicots
- Clade: Rosids
- Order: Fabales
- Family: Fabaceae
- Subfamily: Faboideae
- Genus: Ornithopus
- Species: O. pinnatus

Binomial name
- Ornithopus pinnatus (Mill.) Druce

= Ornithopus pinnatus =

Species of plant

Ornithopus pinnatus, the orange birdsfoot, is a plant in the Fabaceae family. It was first described as Scorpiurus pinnata in 1768 by Philip Miller in The Gardeners Dictionary. In 1907, George Claridge Druce assigned it to the genus Ornithopus.

It is native to Western Europe, the Mediterranean Region and Macaronesia but is found elsewhere as an introduced species.
