= Entrance grave =

Prehistoric burial monument found primarily on the Isles of Scilly, England

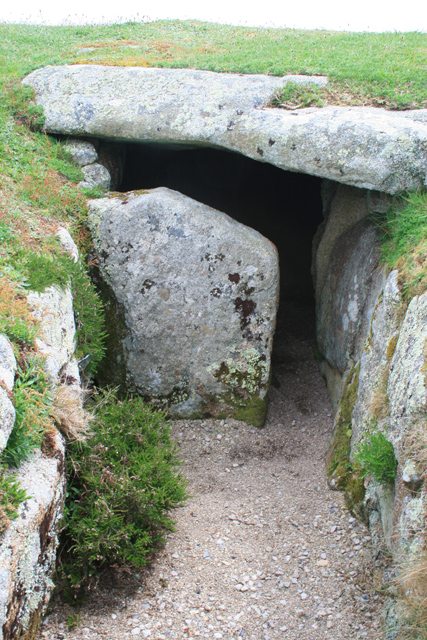
Porth Hellick Down, Isles of Scilly

Entrance grave is a type of Neolithic and early Bronze Age chamber tomb found primarily in Great Britain. The burial monument typically consisted of a circular mound bordered by a stone curb, erected over a rectangular burial chamber and accessed by a narrow, stone lined entrance. Entrance graves have been discovered in the Isles of Scilly, west Cornwall, southeast Ireland, southwest Scotland, Brittany and the Channel Islands. They are often referred to as the Scillonian Group, named for the Scillonian Islands where the majority of entrance graves have been discovered.

== History ==
Entrance graves in Britain are also known as Scillonian entrance graves, because the majority of these ancient burial monuments are found on the Isles of Scilly, a group of islands 25 miles (40 m) west of Cornwall. The islands were originally settled during the Neolithic era, circa 2500 BC. Burials on the islands range in date from the later Neolithic period to the Middle Bronze Age (c. 2500–1000 BC). Over eighty entrance graves have been recorded on the Isles of Scilly. Many date to the late Neolithic period and continued in use until the beginning of the eighth century BC. Excavated entrance graves have contained human remains, cremation urns, and pottery fragments. The excavation of the Knackyboy Carn entrance grave on St. Martin's Island uncovered sixty or more cremated individuals. Entrance graves continued to be built on the Isles of Scilly for many years after individual burials had become the standard burial practice on the mainland of Britain. Besides being used for interments, it has been suggested that entrance graves could have been used for ritualistic and cultural purposes, or to mark land boundaries between different family groups.

== Description ==
An entrance grave usually consisted of a circular mound of stacked rubble and earth, generally up to 25m in diameter. The edge of the mound would be marked with stone. The mound encompassed a rectangular, roofed burial chamber lined with stone, either large slabs or rubble masonry. Many graves have a narrow entrance or passage lined with stone slabs. The chamber roof was typically covered by small stones are large granite slabs. Some grave entrance are blocked with a large stone. Entrance graves may contain single or multiple interments and occur in small or large groups. Along with other types of megalithic chambered tombs, entrance graves are found in western Cornwall, the Isles of Scilly, southeast Ireland, southwest Scotland, the Channel Islands and Brittany. In Britain, the majority of entrance graves are located on the Isles of Scilly.

== Gallery ==
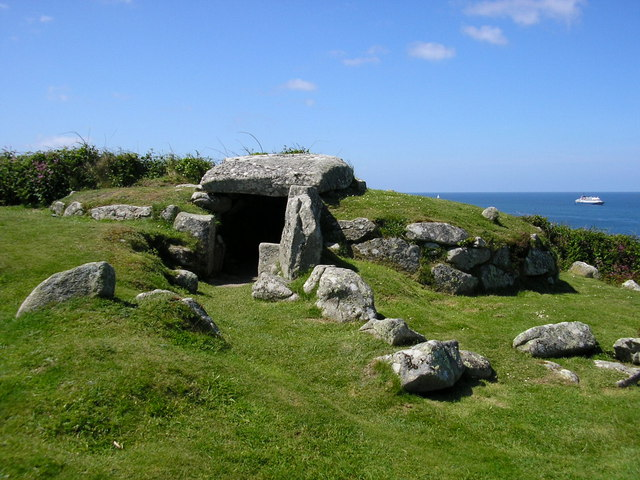
Bant's Carn, St. Mary's

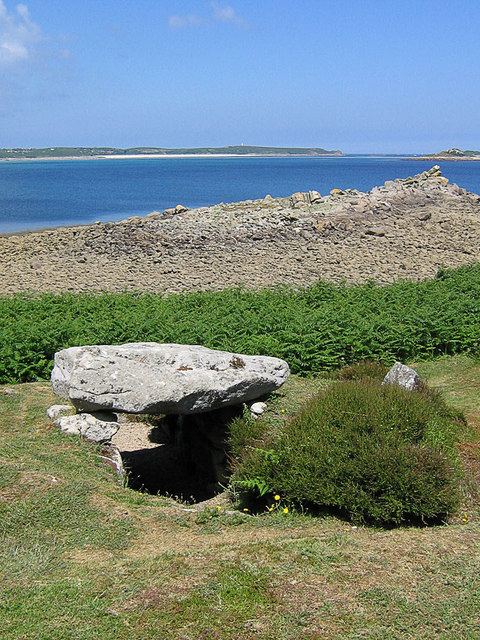
Innisidgen, St. Mary's

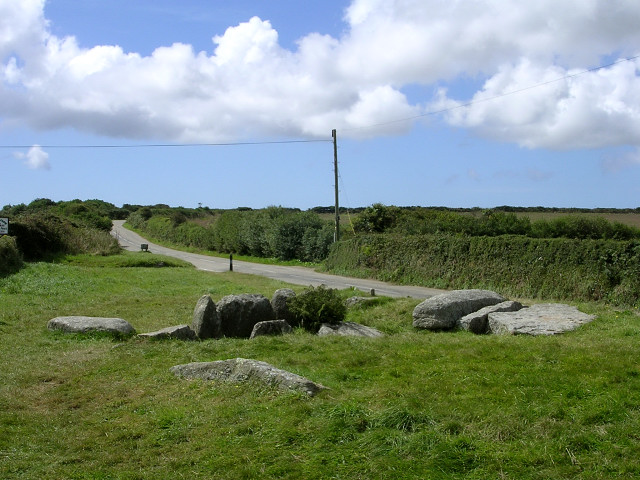
Tregiffian, Lamorna, Cornwall

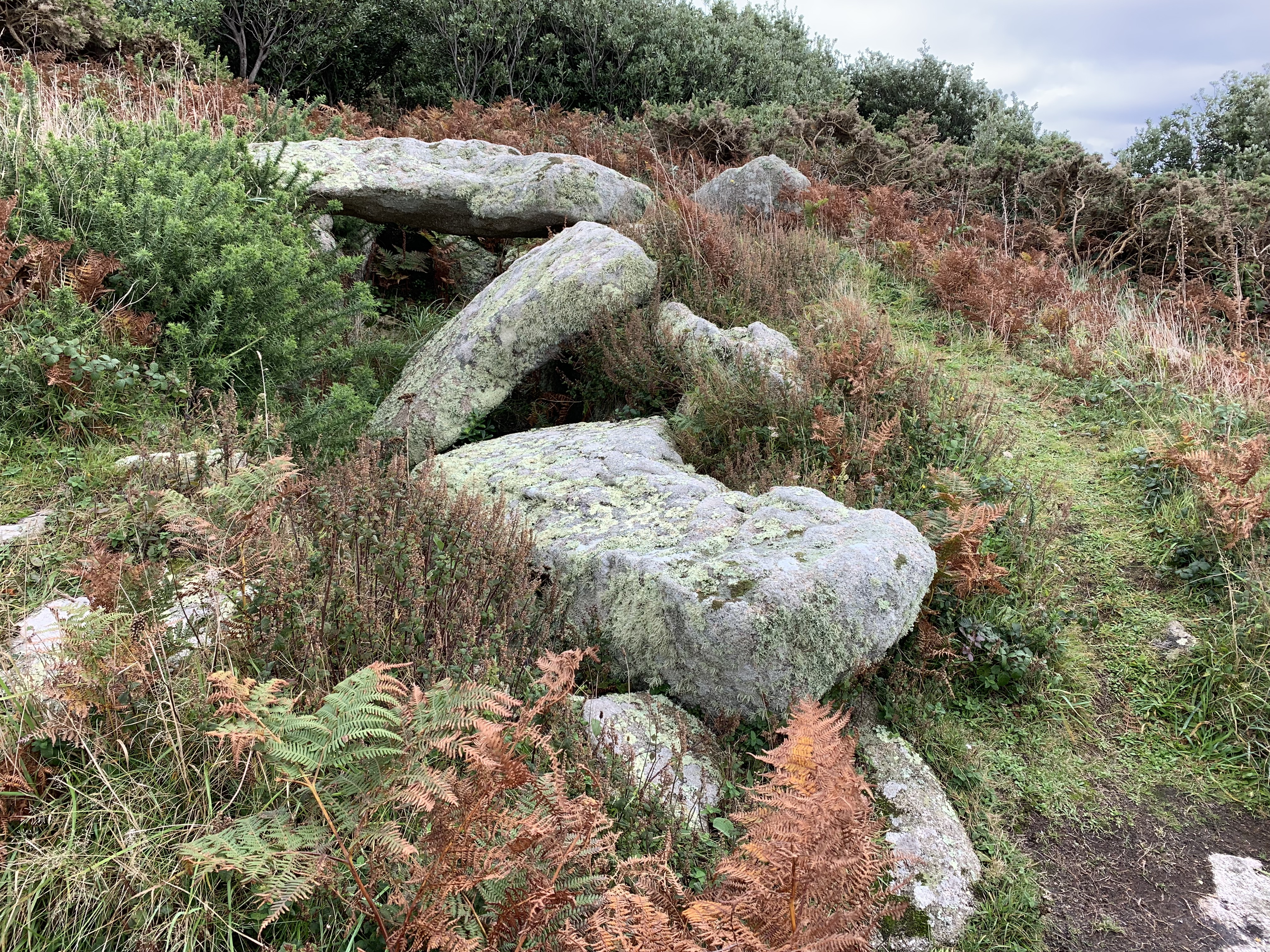
Obadiah's Barrow, Isles of Scilly
