= George Edward Bonsor Saint Martin =

Archaeologist and Painter (1855–1930)

George Edward Bonsor Jorge Bonsor
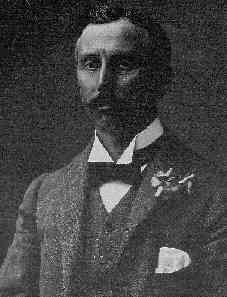
- Born: George Edward Bonsor; 30 March 1855; Lille, Nord, France
- Died: 15 August 1930 (aged 75); Mairena del Alcor, Carmona (Seville), Spain
- Education: Académie Royale des Beaux-Arts, Brussels
- Occupations: Archaeologist; Painter; Pre-historian; Author
- Spouse: Gracia Sánchez Trigueros y Dolores Simó
- Parents: James Bonsor (father); Pauline Marie Leonie Saint Martin Ghislaine (mother)

George Edward Bonsor Saint Martin (March 30, 1855 – August 1930) was a French-born British historian, painter, and archaeologist who is known for the discovery and study of several sites in Spain–including the necropolis and amphitheater at Carmona–parts of the ancient Roman town of Baelo Claudia in Cádiz, and the Setefilla zone in Lora del Río. He was also known as an advocate for the preservation of archaeological sites.

== Early life and family ==
George Edward Bonsor (Note: Known as Jorge Bonsor in Spanish sources) was born on 30 March 1855 in Lille. His father, James Bonsor, was an entrepreneur-engineer originally from Nottingham, England. His mother, Pauline Marie Leonie Saint Martin Ghislaine, was a native of Lille and died of sepsis at the age of 25, a few months after her son's birth.

After Pauline's death, James remarried an English widow named Sarah Gregory (born Sarah Taylor) in 1856, who bore three children: George's half-sisters Claire and Suzanne and his half-brother Willy. George was cared for by his father's sister and her husband, John and Louise Marie Batley, at Seaborough Court, a manor house in Seaborough, until he was old enough to be sent away to boarding school.

Although English-language sources focus on Bonsor's childhood with his English cousins, other sources pay more attention to time spent with his late mother's family in northern France. The Payot Saint-Martin extended family consisting of his mother's uncles and their children lived in the village of Guernes. According to Pauline, his French cousins treated George like another brother. He lived alternately with the Batleys in southern England with his Guernes cousins while his father pursued his various business interests in different parts of the European mainland.

== Education and training ==
Bonsor's family was relatively wealthy on both sides, which was reflected in his education. He was fluent in both English and French as a young teenager, and was able to easily acquire an equivalent mastery of Spanish as a young adult. When Bonsor was old enough to take secondary education, it was determined that he should accompany his father across Europe, and he attended secondary schools in different countries, united by the fact that they were undergoing industrialisation at the time. There is no surviving record of the precise dates of Bonsor's itinerant school career, nor of the durations and sequences, but Juan de Dios de la Rada and subsequent biographers list them as follows: the "Athénée" school in Tournai, Belgium; the "German college" in Moscow; two lycées in Albi and Montauban; and a school in Huddersfield, England. Constant travel became a permanent feature of Bonsor's life, and it developed his intense curiosity, observational abilities, love of geography, and appetite for knowledge.

There are no obvious reasons why, on completing his schooling, Bonsor's interests turned towards the fine arts. There are suggestions that on his extensive boyhood travels with his father he had gained an exceptionally broad exposure to various aspects of Europe's cultural heritage. During the later 1870s he attended fine arts academies in London, and later in Brussels.

Precise dates of Bonsor's university-level studies are unknown. There are widely repeated (though otherwise undocumented) reports that at the Académie Royale des Beaux-Arts in Brussels he won a significant prize for "archaeological technical drawing". This reported prize may reflect "an element of archaeological training", also mentioned by biographers, which otherwise remains unattested, but proved useful after he decided to pursue archaeology as a career. Bonsor became the first self-taught archaeologist who systematically used technical drawings in documenting materials and structures discovered, which he saw as genuinely artistic items. He was a strong advocate of the importance of recording archaeological discoveries. Some time later, he shared his opinion that "no one not intending to provide serious drawings [should be encouraged to embark on an archaeological dig]. I consider it a crime to undertake an excavation without providing a minutely detailed drawing of the excavation." (Note: "Pero no quisiera alentar a nadie que no tenga intención de hacer un dibujo serio, a emprender una excavación como esta. Considero un crimen el excavar sin dar luego un dibujo minucioso de la excavación.") Bonsor was always eager to exploit newly emerging technologies, and complemented drawings with photographs, the latter of which he primarily relied on Ramón Pinzón or Augusto Pérez Romero.

The status of the British Empire as the sole surviving super power had gone mostly unquestioned since the Battle of Trafalgar for Europeans. As the son of an English father, Bonsor was content to present himself as a British subject throughout his life, though when he wrote documents or articles for publication he almost invariably did so using French or Spanish; he rarely wrote anything in English. In 1922 Bonsor provided his own explanation in a card he wrote to Reginald Smith of the British Museum: "I know how odd it must sound that, being an Englishman, I am not able to provide my article in English, and on this I must explain myself. I was born in France, of an English father, and I grew up in Belgium. I came to Spain as a young man, some 40 years ago. I came here to paint, but I soon abandoned art in favour of archaeology."

== Move to Spain ==
After finishing his academic studies, Bonsor travelled to southern Europe to deepen his understanding of Spanish art, in part as a way to consolidate his own painting style. Bonsor's own paintings from this period concentrate on figures of people and costumbrismo scenes. Funding arrived in the form of periodic remittances from the family.

=== Cultural tourist ===
The diaries in which Bonsor meticulously recorded his visit to Spain reveal him to be a systematic man. (Note: Bonsor's diaries have not been catalogied and published. However, María Peñalver Simó quotes them extensively in notes she prepared for her 1960 doctoral dissertation. The dissertation was, in effect, a biography of Jorge Bonsor. The biographical dissertation also remains unpublished. The notes Peñalver produced for it are nevertheless retained at the University of Seville where they have been accessed by scholars. It is believed that the various quotes from Bonsor's diaries that have appeared in print since that time are likely have been based, with or without attribution, on Peñalver's notes.) There is no obvious indication that when he set out to visit Spain, it had occurred to him that he would be living in the country for the rest of his life. His impressions of what he saw and the accounting for his expenses are recorded in detail in French. For most of the tour he was accompanied by Paulus, a Belgian Roman Catholic and a companion from his time at the Beaux-Arts Académie in Brussels. They traveled to Burgos, where they made their first stop. The underlying objective of the trip was to visit the artistic monuments, art museums and anything else that might be of interest to youthful artists from the north. In his diary Bonsor recorded the names of more than ten of his former fellow students from the Beaux-Arts Académie who took the opportunity to visit other southern European countries. Several of the former student contemporaries he names later became members of the "Les XX", the group of twenty Belgian artists who later formed the nucleus of an artistic revival in and around Brussels during the 1890s.

In Burgos Bonsor and Paulus befriended Primitivo Carcedo, who showed them the city, paying particular attention to the great Gothic cathedral and the Miraflores Charterhouse. Carcedo helped them improve their Spanish and supervised their first visit to a Spanish taverna. Bonsor and Paulus later went to Puerta del Sol. Bonsor recorded in his diary their visit to the Real Academia de Bellas Artes de San Fernando where they observed Francisco Pradilla's recently completed Doña Joanna the Mad. They spent time at the Prado and made their own copies of paintings to better understand the underlying techniques of the originators. Shortly before their departure from Madrid they visited the National Archaeological Museum, at which point Bonsor confided in his diary that the place bored him supremely. (Note: "La ciudad de Madrid me aburre soberanamente.")

They travelled to Toledo. The city in which El Greco had lived out his last years immediately captivated Bonsor: "The city of Toledo I liked enormously, from the first glimpse: I see that there are many things that I have to paint here". (Note: "La ciudad de Toledo al primer golpe de vista me gusta enormemente y veo que tengo muchas cosas que pintar aquí.") The people he picked out were the types that tend to capture the attention of many foreign visitors, the street beggars, the gypsies and the priests. His diary entries include precisely observed descriptions of historical and artisanal monuments. On some of these he produced brief literary essays that accompanied the letters of thanks that he sent to relatives for the cash remittances on which he was still dependent.

Bonsor's next stop was Córdoba, where he stayed for one night. He saw the city walls, the Roman bridge (which was Córdoba's only bridge over the Guadalquivir river until 1953), and Córdoba's remarkable Mezquita-catedral. His diary indicates that his first visit to Seville was also something of a disappointment, however.

Bonsor found little that he wanted to paint in Seville, and an entry in his diary indicated that his first visit to the city was disappointing. He visited the Seville Cathedral, though with the sole purpose (he wrote) of admiring the works of Bartolomé Esteban Murillo. He also visited the provincial museum and the Hospital de la Caridad, where he came across a painting by Juan de Valdés Leal. While respectful of Seville's rich artistic legacy, Bonsor was underwhelmed by contemporary Sevillan painters, whom he found "mediocre". Based on a recommendation from his father, who back in 1845 had visited the town of Carmona in the hill country a short distance inland from Seville, in 1881 Bonsor decided to visit the place for himself.

== Carmona ==
Bonsor's first visit to Carmona lasted just four days. He spent his time identifying and in some cases sketching scenes to which he would later return in order to paint what he saw, both in oils and in watercolours. After thoroughly exploring the little town and its surroundings, he left Carmona for Gibraltar, where he had arranged to meet his aunt and uncle, Marie and John Batley, together with their elder son, Armytage Batley. He accompanied his relatives on a little tour of the region, taking in visits to Málaga, Granada and Seville, where he left them, returning again to Carmona on 4 March 1881. A few weeks later he was back in Gibraltar, re-acquainting himself with the British Empire, and where he unexpectedly came across his friend and student contemporary Paulus again. They decided to travel to Tangier, staying in Morocco together between 7 and 17 May 1881. After that unscheduled trip Bonsor returned to Carmona where he remained for the next nine months.

Bonsor loved to observe and to paint scenes from the vibrant daily life of the townsfolk, much of which in those days was centred round the church. He sometimes added his own jocular notes to his paintings: "The poor Spanish beggars are numerous, cheerful, and heavy smokers. When I paint, the poor blind folks passing by always come across to evaluate what I am doing with an expert eye! Which goes to show that when it comes to my own work, these guys are not as blind as the others."

During Holy Week in 1881 Bonsor prepared a detailed painting of the Carmona Procession of St. James on Maundy Thursday. His diary record indicates a loss of the famous reserve that people associated with well-born English gentlemen: "When night came, I watched from my balcony the procession passing with all its lights. On the balcony opposite there were several girls who began to gossip and giggle as soon as they saw me: 'It's that foreigner! It's the painter!'. One of them, her face half covered behind her black mantilla, seemed to be asking me for something! So I concentrated only on her, and no longer watched the passing procession".

Bonsor became widely liked in the town and was known to his fellow townsfolk as "the English painter". When he painted in the streets, people would stop and pass comments such as "How beautifully painted that lamp is", which gave rise to the comment in his diary "I am building a reputation as a painter of oil lamps". He received a commission from Father José Barrera, one of the priests in the town, to produce a portrait of Father Sebastián Gómez Muñiz, the town's vicar. Bonsor was paid four duros "for materials". He confided his delight to his diary, "See how in Spain today it is only the priests who encourage painters".

Another of the local spectacles in which Bonsor took delight was the toro de cuerda, an old tradition often associated with bull-fighting, though purists insist that the two ritualised events have nothing in common beyond the involvement of bulls and some of the bull-related perils for the young men involved.
