= Innisidgen =

Two entrances graves in the Isles of Scilly

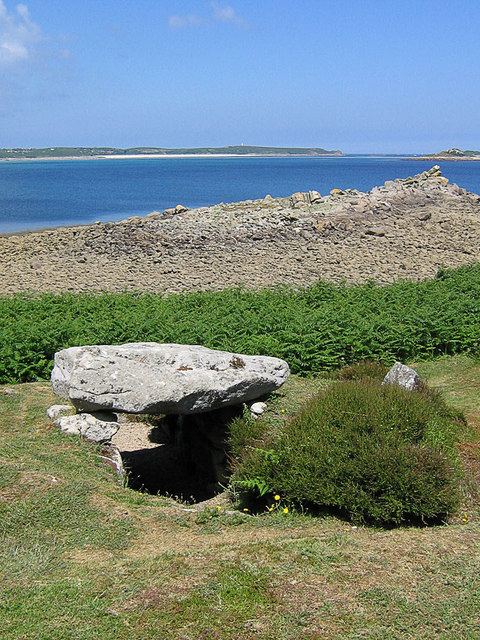
- Lower entrance Grave at Inisidgen

- Location within Isles of Scilly
- 49°56′06″N 6°17′30″W
- Location: St Mary's, Isles of Scilly

History
- Built: Bronze Age

Innisidgen (Cornish: Enys Ojyon, meaning Ox Island) is the site of two Bronze Age entrance graves on the island of St Mary's in the Isles of Scilly. The two burial monuments, (Upper and Lower Innisidgen) lie on a steep slope of Innisidgen Hill overlooking Crow Sound with a view towards the Eastern Isles.

== Innisidgen Hill ==
Innisidgen Hill is a scheduled monument on the Isles of Scilly, north east of Hugh Town, the largest village on the Island of St. Mary's. It is the site of two Bronze Age entrance graves that overlook Crow Sound and the Eastern Isles in Scilly. Innisidgen Hill is located near the small settlement of Trenowieh. The larger burial chamber, generally referred to as "Upper Innisidgen", is perched on top of Innisidgen Hill. The smaller grave, "Lower Inisigen", is located on the lower northern slope of the hill. The burial monument also includes an archeological site dating to the English Civil War.

=== Lower Innisidgen ===
Lower Innisidgen lies near the bottom of the northern slope of Innisidgen Hill. This grave is more damaged than the upper grave and has only two of its original capstones. Parts of the surrounding kerb of the mound remain, while the mound itself incorporates small outcroppings of rock. This entrance grave consists of a circular mound of earth and rubble, 8.5m in diameter and 1.7m in height. Inside the mound is a central chamber, 5.4m long 1.3m wide, and 1m high. The entrance to the chamber is on the south side of the mound and faces north. The walls of the burial space are lined with coursed rubble. There is a large stone positioned at the northern end of the chamber and large slabs edge the central and northern parts of the east wall. Two capstones provide a roof to the central and southern parts of the chamber. During an unauthorized excavation in 1950, the chamber was emptied of its existing earth and rubble.

=== Upper Innisidgen ===
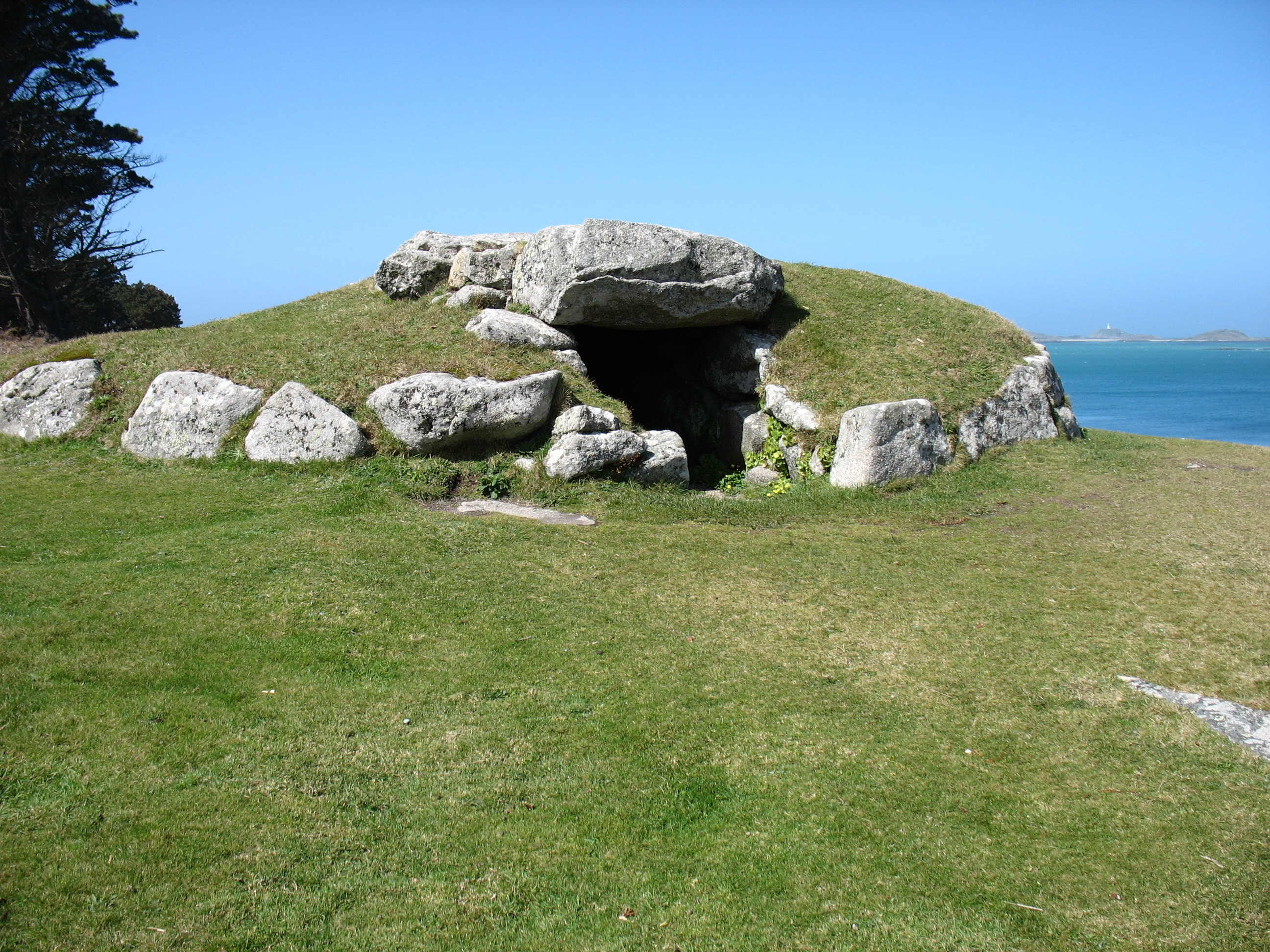
Upper entrance grave at Innisdgen

Upper Innisidgen, also known as "The Giant's Grave", is one of the best preserved entrance graves on Scilly. The entrance grave consists of a slightly oblong mound of earth and rubble measuring 9m by 8m, and is 1.8m in height. The mound's surrounding kerb is approximately 1 metres high on its north side. There are remnants of an outer platform, up to 2m wide. The grave's upper surface is composed of turf. The mound covers an intact burial chamber with an entrance at the eastern side of the mound. The entrance is covered by a large stone slab. The rectangular chamber is 4.6m long and approximately 1.5m wide and 1.2m high. The chamber walls are lined with large slabs. Along the north-northeast wall, are coursed smaller slabs and rubble. The west-northwest end of the chamber is blocked by a large edge-set slab. Five large slabs make up the roof of the burial chamber. The roof slabs are slightly exposed in the grassy surface of the mound.

== History ==
The Isles of Scilly were originally settled during the Neolithic era, circa 2500 BC. Burial monuments on the islands range in date from the later Neolithic period to the Middle Bronze Age (c.2500-1000 BC). Entrance graves are distinguished by their burial chamber, typically constructed with edge-set slabs, coursed rubble walling or both, and roofed by large covering slabs. The chamber is usually accessible through an opening in the mound's stone outer edge. Excavations of entrance graves have generally uncovered cremation urns, pottery fragments and cremated and unburnt human bones.

The two entrance graves at Innisidgen Hill were built during the Bronze Age. At the time of construction, the burial chambers overlooked a coastal inlet, later known as Crow Sound. During the prehistoric era, this site would have encompassed a wide valley of fields enclosed by stone walls. The remains of a prehistoric field system are located on the northern slope of Innisidgen hill next to the entrance graves, discernible as earth and piles of rubble. No artefacts or human remains were found when both graves were first excavated in 1854.
