= Diniaș salt marshes =

- IUCN category IV (habitat/species management area)
- Location within Romania
- Location: Diniaș (Peciu Nou), Timiș County, Romania
- Coordinates: 45°38′41″N 21°1′45″E
- Area: 4 ha (9.9 acres)
- Established: 1995, 2000

The Diniaș salt marshes are a nationally designated protected area, classified as an IUCN Category IV pedological nature reserve. They are located in Timiș County, within the administrative boundaries of Peciu Nou commune.

== Location ==
The Diniaș salt marshes are situated in the western part of Timiș County, near the village of Diniaș, southwest of Timișoara. They lie along county road DJ519A, which connects Peciu Nou and Sânmihaiu Român.

== Description ==
The Diniaș salt marshes, covering an area of 4 hectares, were designated as a nature reserve of national importance under Law No. 5 of March 6, 2000. The reserve protects salt marsh ecosystems that host numerous rare plant species, offering valuable opportunities for studying vegetation development in natural conditions. The salt marsh vegetation is characteristic of Pannonian halophilic meadows and marshes, typically forming in a mosaic-like pattern. A total of 216 species are found here, including 12 obligate halophytes, 31 preferential halophytes, 57 supportive halophytes, 95 accidental halophytes, and 21 species that are entirely incidental within the halophilic vegetation, primarily originating from adjacent anthropogenic phytocenoses.

Plant species found in the reserve include goose tongue (Plantago maritima), wormwood (Artemisia santonicum), Tatarian orache (Atriplex tatarica), grassleaf orache (Atriplex littoralis), tiny mousetail (Myosurus minimus), strawberry clover (Trifolium fragiferum), creeping buttercup (Ranunculus pedatus), slender bird's foot trefoil (Lotus angustissimus), and sea aster (Tripolium pannonicum). Within the reserve area, particularly in the salt marshes that develop in the spring, a type of algae (cyanobacteria) commonly referred to as "star jelly" (Nostoc commune) can be found. This site also hosts the largest population of hog's fennel (Peucedanum officinale) in the Banat region.

Among the dragonfly species (Odonata) found at the site, Lestes barbarus from the Lestidae family is notable. This species is adapted to drought conditions, with adults exhibiting increased mobility and eggs that are resistant to desiccation. It is typically associated with channels containing temporary and sometimes saline water.
