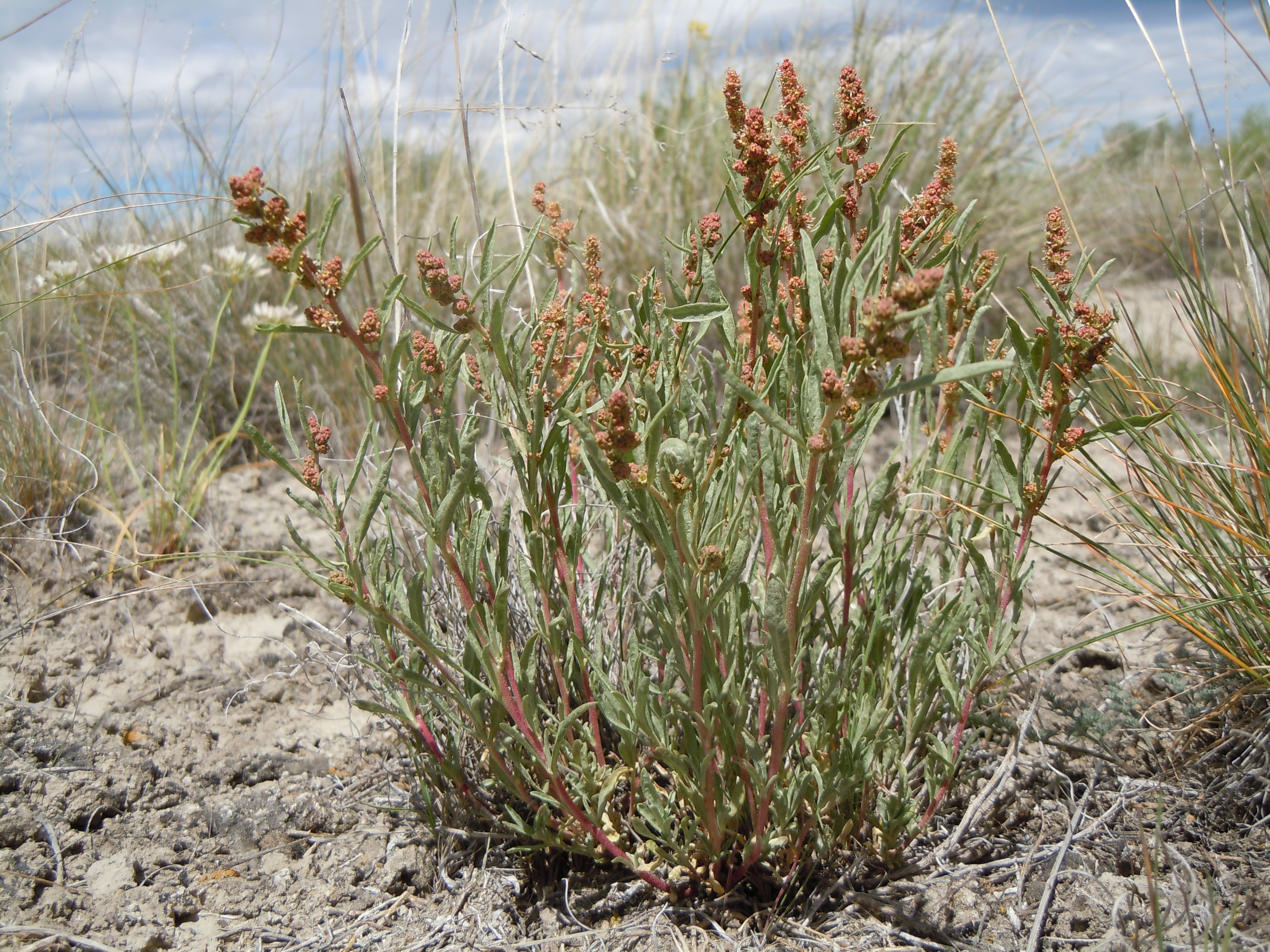
- var. falcata

Conservation status
- Secure (NatureServe)

Scientific classification
- Kingdom: Plantae
- Clade: Tracheophytes
- Clade: Angiosperms
- Clade: Eudicots
- Order: Caryophyllales
- Family: Amaranthaceae
- Genus: Atriplex
- Species: A. gardneri

Binomial name
- Atriplex gardneri (Moq.) D.Dietr.

= Atriplex gardneri =

Species of flowering plant

Atriplex gardneri is a species of flowering plant in the amaranth family known by the common name Gardner's saltbush. It is native to western North America from British Columbia to Saskatchewan in Canada south to Nevada and New Mexico in the United States. The specific epithet of the species, gardneri, is misnamed after its first collector, Alexander Gordon. The naturalist Alfred Moquin-Tandon was under the impression that Gordon's last name was Gardner.

This species is currently considered to be a complex of several varieties and the species is variable in appearance. The varieties can be variable in ploidy level, with diploid, triploid, tetraploid, hexaploid, and others known. Diploid and polyploid individuals may occupy different types of habitat. The varieties intergrade with each other and they can hybridize with each other and with other Atriplex such as Atriplex corrugata.

In general, the plant is a shrub or subshrub growing 10 centimetres (3.9 in) to 1 metre (3.3 ft) in height. The stems may be prostrate or upright. The leaves may be oppositely or alternately arranged and they vary in shape and size. They may be green or grayish green in color. The species can be dioecious or monoecious with male and female flower parts located on separate plants or on the same plant. Flower color can vary across the varieties. The plant produces many seeds. The plant reproduces by seed and by resprouting and layering.

In one treatment, varieties include:

- A. g. var. aptera - Nelson's saltbush, native to the Great Plains.
- A. g. var. bonnevillensis - Bonneville saltbush, native to Nevada and Utah
- A. g. var. cuneata - Castle Valley saltbush, occurs in Utah, Colorado, and New Mexico
- A. g. var. falcata - Jones' saltbush, occurs in the western United States
- A. g. var. gardneri - a widespread variety
- A. g. var. utahensis - basin saltbush, occurs in the western United States
- A. g. var. welshii - Welsh's saltbush, usually occurs with var. cuneata

This plant like many other Atriplex is commonly found on salty and alkaline soils. The soils may be clay or sandy. It is a member of several types of saltbush-greasewood plant communities, the two shrub types often occurring together. In some habitats it is a climax species but it also takes hold during secondary succession after a habitat has been disturbed. This species is considered fire-resistant because it is low in flammable oils and high in ash and similar compounds. When it does burn down, the plant grows back quickly by resprouting from its roots. It is sometimes planted in fuelbreaks in California.

The leaves of the plant are a fairly nutritious food source for animals including antelope, some rabbit species, and pronghorn. It is an important source of minimum nutritional requirements for ewes (female sheep) undergoing a gestation period.

This species blooms from May to August.
