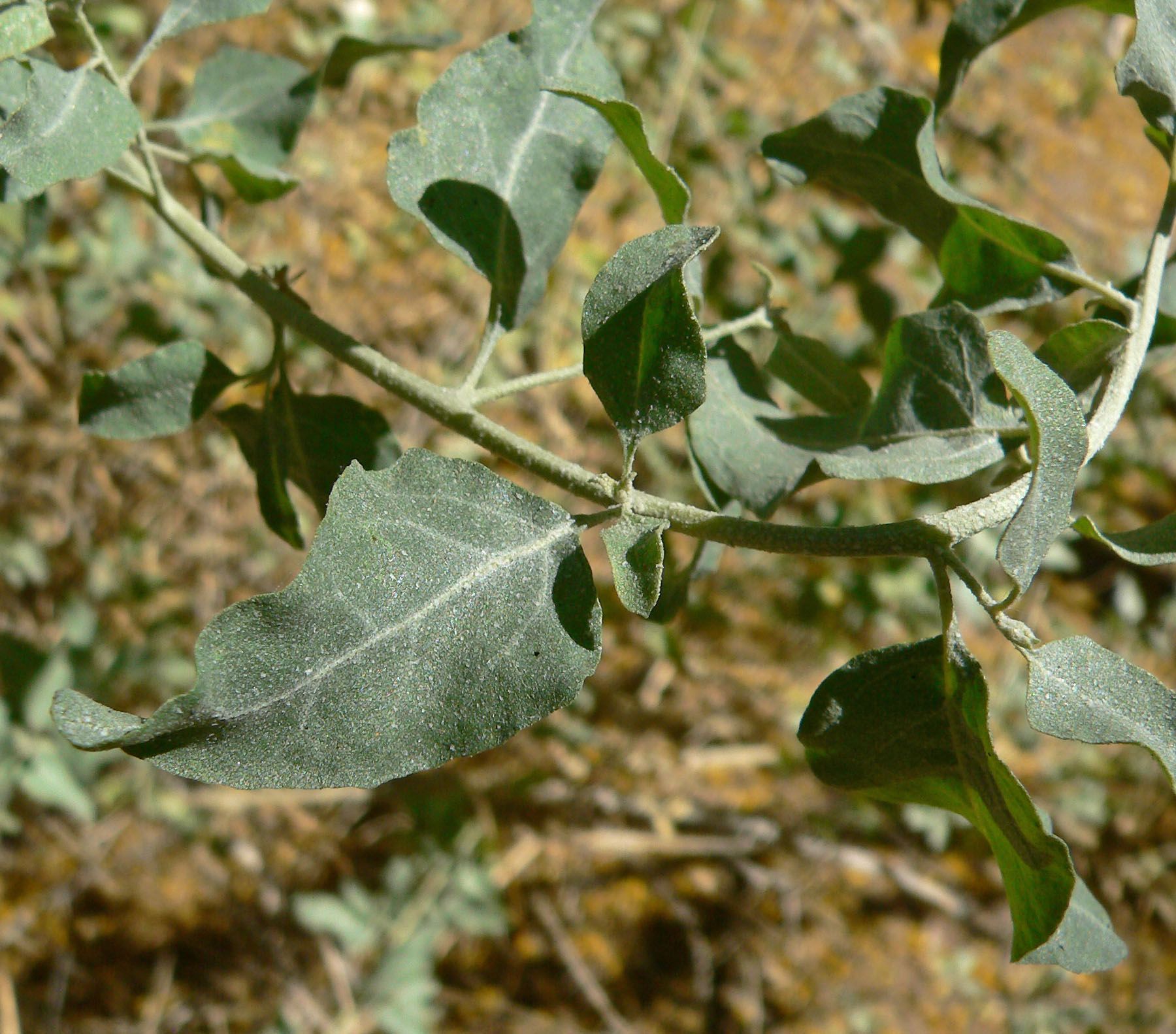

Conservation status
- Secure (NatureServe)

Scientific classification
- Kingdom: Plantae
- Clade: Embryophytes
- Clade: Tracheophytes
- Clade: Angiosperms
- Clade: Eudicots
- Order: Caryophyllales
- Family: Amaranthaceae
- Genus: Atriplex
- Species: A. lentiformis

Binomial name
- Atriplex lentiformis (Torr.) S.Watson

Synonyms
- Atriplex breweri; Obione breweri; Obione lentiformis

= Atriplex lentiformis =

Species of bush

Atriplex lentiformis (quail bush, big saltbrush, big saltbush, quailbrush, lenscale, len-scale saltbush and white thistle) is a species of saltbush.

== Description ==
Atriplex lentiformis is a spreading, communal shrub reaching one to three meters in height and generally more in width. It is highly branched and bears scaly or scurfy gray-green leaves up to 5 centimeters long and often toothed or rippled along the edges. This species may be dioecious or monoecious, with individuals bearing either male or female flowers, or sometimes both. Male flowers are borne in narrow inflorescences up to 50 centimeters long, while inflorescences of female flowers are smaller and more compact. Plants can change from monoecious to dioecious and from male to female and vice versa.

This species blooms in June and October.

== Taxonomy ==
Atriplex lentiformis was scientifically described by John Torrey in 1853 and named Obione lentiformis. It was moved to the genus Atriplex in 1874 by the botanist Sereno Watson. Together with its genus it is classified in the Amaranthaceae family and has no accepted subspecies according to Plants of the World Online. It has seven synonyms.

Table of Synonyms
Name	Year	Rank	Notes
Atriplex breweri S.Watson	1874	species	= het.
Atriplex lentiformis subsp. breweri (S.Watson) H.M.Hall & Clem.	1923	subspecies	= het.
Atriplex lentiformis var. breweri (S.Watson) McMinn	1939	variety	= het.
Atriplex lentiformis subsp. typica H.M.Hall & Clem.	1923	subspecies	≡ hom., not validly publ.
Obione breweri (S.Watson) S.C.Sand. & G.L.Chu	2017	species	= het.
Obione lentiformis Torr.	1853	species	≡ hom.
Obione lentiformis var. rhombifolia Torr.	1857	variety	= het.
Notes: ≡ homotypic synonym ; = heterotypic synonym

== Distribution ==
Atriplex lentiformis is native to the southwestern United States and northern Mexico, where it grows in habitats with saline such as salt flats and dry lake beds, coastline, and desert scrub. It can also be found in nonsaline soils on riverbanks and woodland.

In the southwestern US it grows in the southern half of California, though also in the northern Central Valley, in southern Nevada, and western Arizona. In Utah it is only found in Washington County in the southwest corner of the state. In Mexico it is native to the northwestern states of Baja California, Baja California Sur, and Sonora.

=== Lower Gila River and Colorado River regions ===
Atriplex lentiformis grows in the Mesquite Bosque vegetative association with the native Arrowweed - Pluchea sericea, Velvet mesquite - Prosopis velutina, and others in the Lower Colorado River Valley and Gila River valleys of southwestern Arizona, southeastern California, and northwestern Mexico.

The maximum height occurs where a groundwater source supplies plentiful moisture, and saline soil conditions are optimal for the quailbush with other plants losing from the competition. However, the invasive species Tamarisk - Tamarix ramosissima and tumbleweed, Tumbling oracle - Atriplex rosea are successful and problematic competitors. The saltbush can reach 3.5 metres (11 ft) tall and wide in advantageous growing locales, with the form becoming a large flattened hemisphere, with adjacent hemispheres merging into an impenetrable thicket mass.

== Uses ==
This saltbush species, A. lentiformis, and Atriplex canescens are the food plants for the saltbush sootywing Hesperopsis alpheus, a butterfly.

Atriplex lentiformis is used in restoration of riparian habitats, one of the native plants in riparian zone restoration projects in its native ranges.
