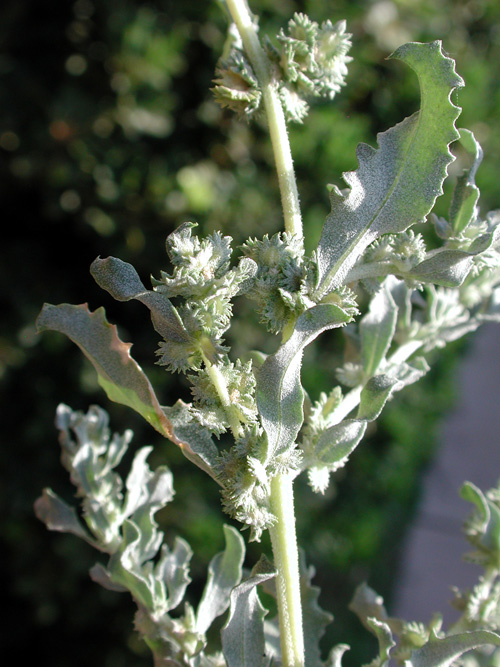

Scientific classification
- Kingdom: Plantae
- Clade: Tracheophytes
- Clade: Angiosperms
- Clade: Eudicots
- Order: Caryophyllales
- Family: Amaranthaceae
- Genus: Atriplex
- Species: A. elegans

Binomial name
- Atriplex elegans (Moq.) D.Dietr.

Subspecies
- Atriplex elegans var. coronata (S. Watson) M.E. Jones, 1908; Atriplex elegans subsp. elegans; Atriplex elegans var. elegans; Atriplex elegans subsp. fasciculata (S. Watson) H.M. Hall & Clem., 1923; Atriplex elegans var. fasciculata (S. Watson) M.E. Jones, 1908; Atriplex elegans subsp. thornberi (M.E. Jones) W.L. Wagner, 1978; Atriplex elegans var. thornberi M.E. Jones, 1908; Atriplex elegans subsp. typica H.M. Hall & Clem., 1923

Synonyms
- Obione elegans Moq.

= Atriplex elegans =

Species of flowering plant

Atriplex elegans is a species of saltbush known by the common name wheelscale saltbush, Mecca orach, or wheelscale. It is native to the Southwestern United States, and northern Mexico, where it grows in areas of saline or alkaline soils, such as alkali flats and desert dry lakebeds.

== Description ==
This is an annual herb with a scaly branching stem which spreads somewhat upright to heights between 10 and 50 centimeters. The crusty whitish leaves are narrowly oval in shape, sometimes toothed along the edges, and less than 3 centimeters long. The inflorescences bear separate male and female flowers which are in small, hard clusters.
