= Red orache =

Red orache (/ˈɒrətʃ/; also spelled orach) is a common name of at least two related plants:

- Atriplex hortensis
- Atriplex rosea, native to Eurasia
