= Coleophora binotapennella =

Scientific classification
- Kingdom: Animalia
- Phylum: Arthropoda
- Clade: Pancrustacea
- Class: Insecta
- Order: Lepidoptera
- Family: Coleophoridae
- Genus: Coleophora
- Species: C. binotapennella

Binomial name
- Coleophora binotapennella (Duponchel, 1843)

Synonyms
- Ornix binotapennella Duponchel, 1843; Carpochena binotapennella; Coleophora delibutella Christoph, 1872; Stollia lygia Nemes, 2003; Coleophora binotatella Zeller, 1849

Species of moth

Coleophora binotapennella is a moth of the family Coleophoridae. It is found in Spain, France, Germany, the Czech Republic, Slovakia, Hungary, Romania, North Macedonia, Lithuania, Ukraine, northern and southern Russia and China. It occurs in desert-steppe and desert biotopes.

Adults are on wing in July and August.

The larvae feed on Atriplex nitens, Atriplex tatarica and possibly Chenopodium species. They feed on the generative organs of their host plant.
