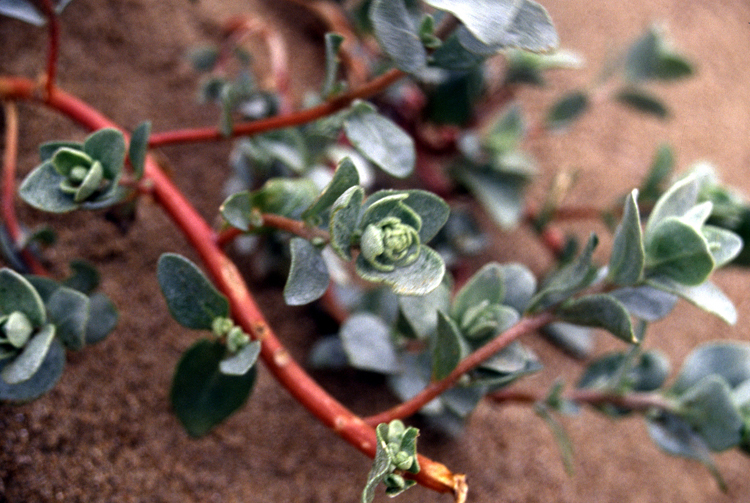

Scientific classification
- Kingdom: Plantae
- Clade: Tracheophytes
- Clade: Angiosperms
- Clade: Eudicots
- Order: Caryophyllales
- Family: Amaranthaceae
- Genus: Atriplex
- Species: A. leucophylla

Binomial name
- Atriplex leucophylla (Moq.) D. Dietr.

= Atriplex leucophylla =

Species of flowering plant

Atriplex leucophylla is a species of saltbush known by the common names beach saltbush and white orache. It is native to the coastline of California and Baja California, and the Channel Islands, where it is a resident of beach dunes and other sandy areas.

== Description ==
This is a short, sprawling perennial herb reaching a maximum height near 30 centimeters. The branching stems grow along the ground or slightly upright and may be up to a meter- 3 feet long. The plentiful leaves are oval in shape and are 1 to 4 centimeters long. The foliage and sometimes the stems are rough with whitish scaly surfaces.

The plants are monoecious, with individuals producing male and female flowers. The staminate (male) flowers grow in rounded clusters and lack bracts. The pistillate (female) flowers are oval or round ovaries surrounded by spongy bracts. They develop into fruits containing small seeds.

The bloom period of this species is one of the longest of the Atriplex genus. It blooms from April to October.
