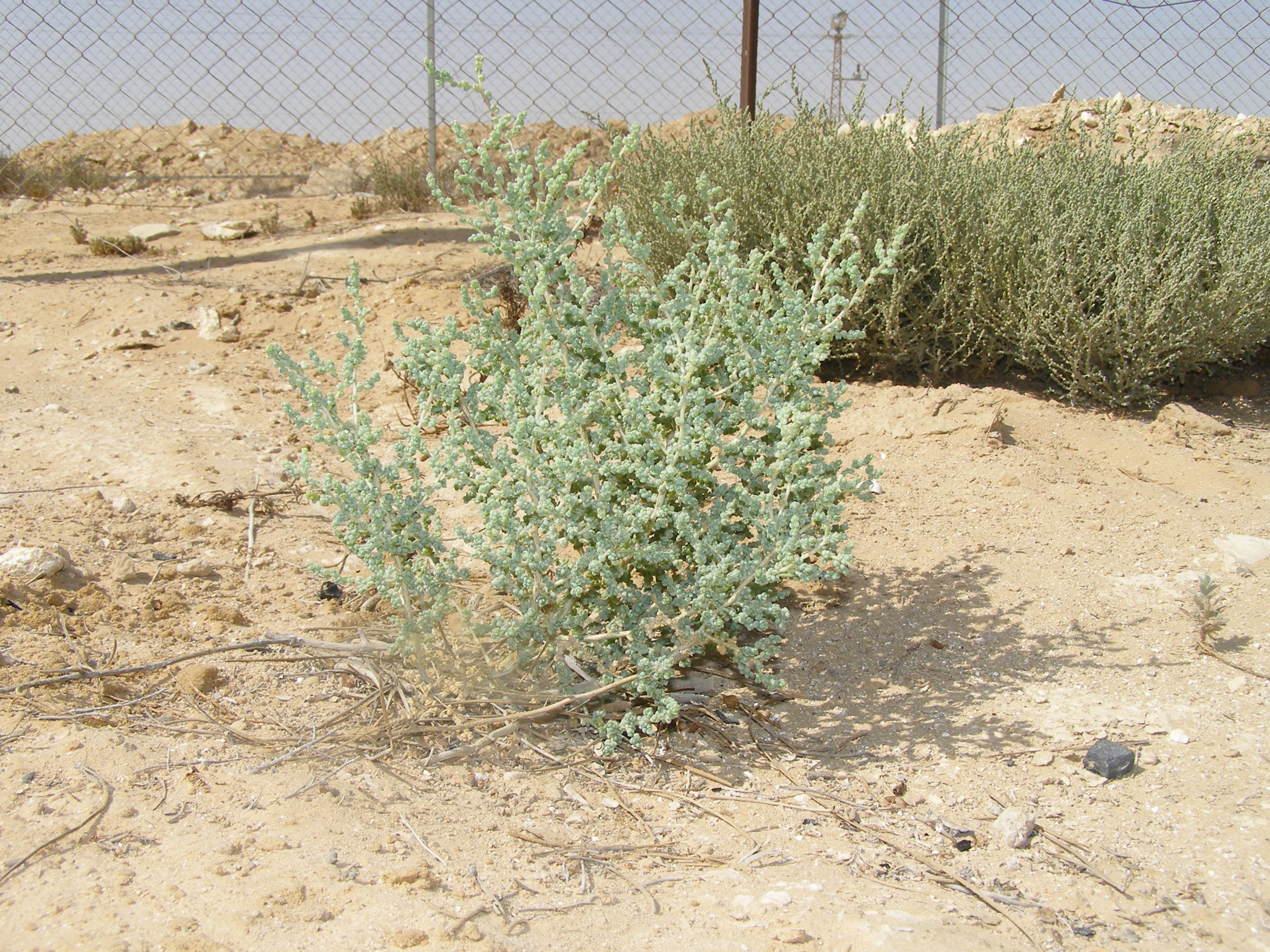

Scientific classification
- Kingdom: Plantae
- Clade: Tracheophytes
- Clade: Angiosperms
- Clade: Eudicots
- Order: Caryophyllales
- Family: Amaranthaceae
- Genus: Atriplex
- Species: A. polycarpa

Binomial name
- Atriplex polycarpa (Torr.) S.Watson

= Atriplex polycarpa =

Species of flowering plant

Atriplex polycarpa, the allscale, (or all-scale) cattle spinach, allscale saltbush, or cattle saltbush, is a plant in the family Amaranthaceae.

It is native to the Southwestern United States, California, and northern Mexico.

This species blooms in July and August.
