= Atriplex rhagodioides =

Scientific classification
- Kingdom: Plantae
- Clade: Tracheophytes
- Clade: Angiosperms
- Clade: Eudicots
- Order: Caryophyllales
- Family: Amaranthaceae
- Genus: Atriplex
- Species: A. rhagodioides

Binomial name
- Atriplex rhagodioides F.Muell.

Synonyms
- Atriplex cinerea subsp. rhagodioides (F.Muell.) Aellen; Obione rhagodioides (F.Muell.) G.L.Chu

Species of plant in the amaranth family

Atriplex rhagodioides, the river saltbush, is a species of flowering plant in the family Amaranthaceae, found from southeastern South Australia to northwestern Victoria. It usually grows on river banks or on flats.
