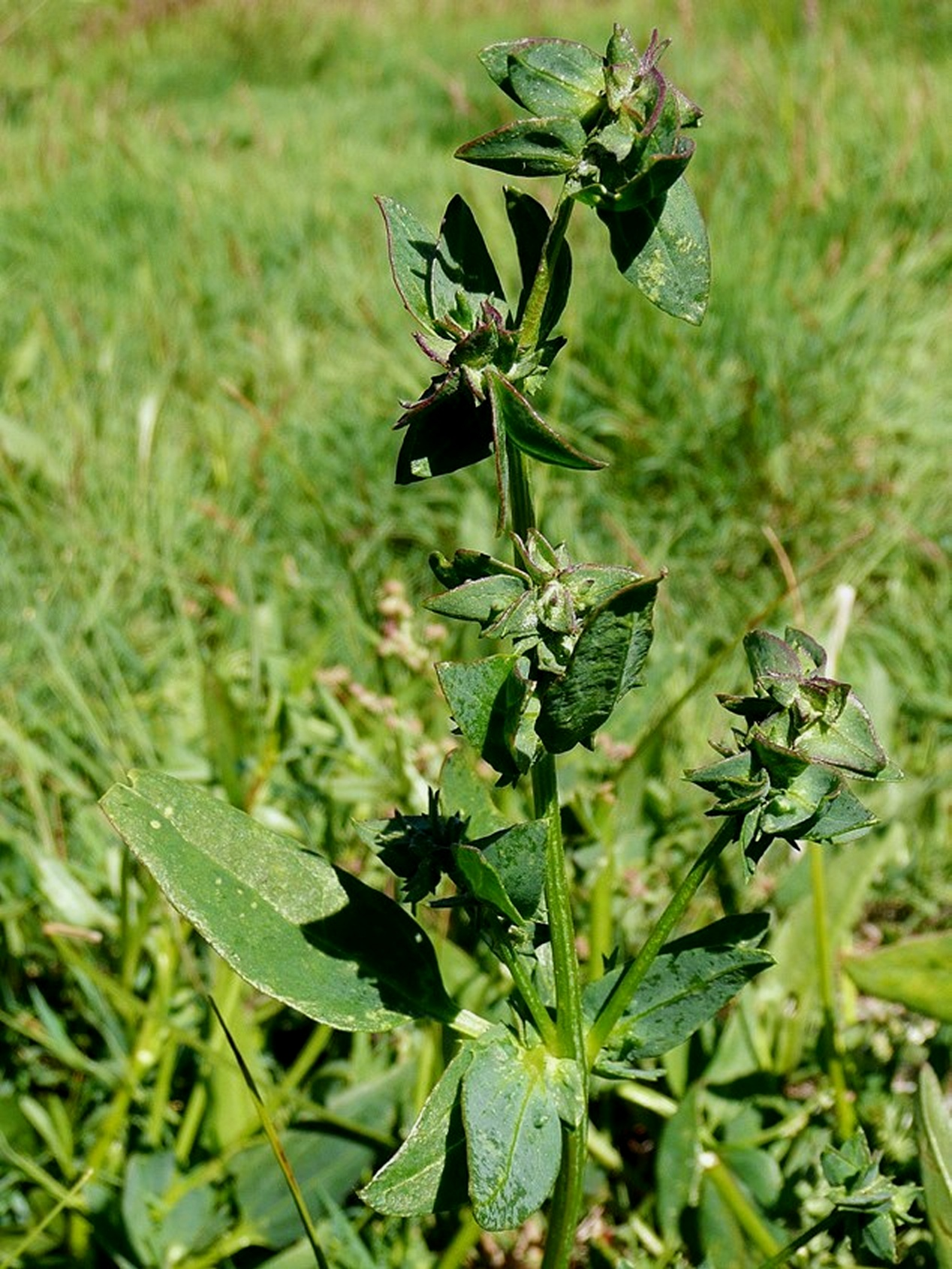

Scientific classification
- Kingdom: Plantae
- Clade: Tracheophytes
- Clade: Angiosperms
- Clade: Eudicots
- Order: Caryophyllales
- Family: Amaranthaceae
- Genus: Atriplex
- Species: A. longipes

Binomial name
- Atriplex longipes Drejer

= Atriplex longipes =

Species of flowering plant

Atriplex longipes is a species of plant belonging to the family Amaranthaceae.

Its native range is northwestern and northern Europe.
