= Atriplex parishii =

Conservation status
- Critically Imperiled (NatureServe)

Scientific classification
- Kingdom: Plantae
- Clade: Tracheophytes
- Clade: Angiosperms
- Clade: Eudicots
- Order: Caryophyllales
- Family: Amaranthaceae
- Genus: Atriplex
- Species: A. parishii

Binomial name
- Atriplex parishii S.Watson

Synonyms
- Obione parishii

Species of flowering plant

Atriplex parishii is an uncommon species of saltbush known by the common names Parish's saltbush and Parish's brittlescale. It is native to central and southern California where it can occasionally be found along the immediate coastline, and the Channel Islands. Its distribution extended historically into the western edges of the Mojave Desert and Baja California and it may still exist there.

This is a plant of saline and alkaline soils, such as those on dry lakebeds and ephemeral vernal pools. There are five varieties of the plant, each growing in a separate and disjunct region of the species' distribution; some varieties are known only from the Central Valley.

This is a small annual herb producing whitish scaly prostrate stems less than 20 centimeters long. The numerous rough whitish leaves are under a centimeter long and oval to somewhat heart-shaped. The flowers, both male and female types, are generally borne in hard clusters.

This species blooms from June to October.
