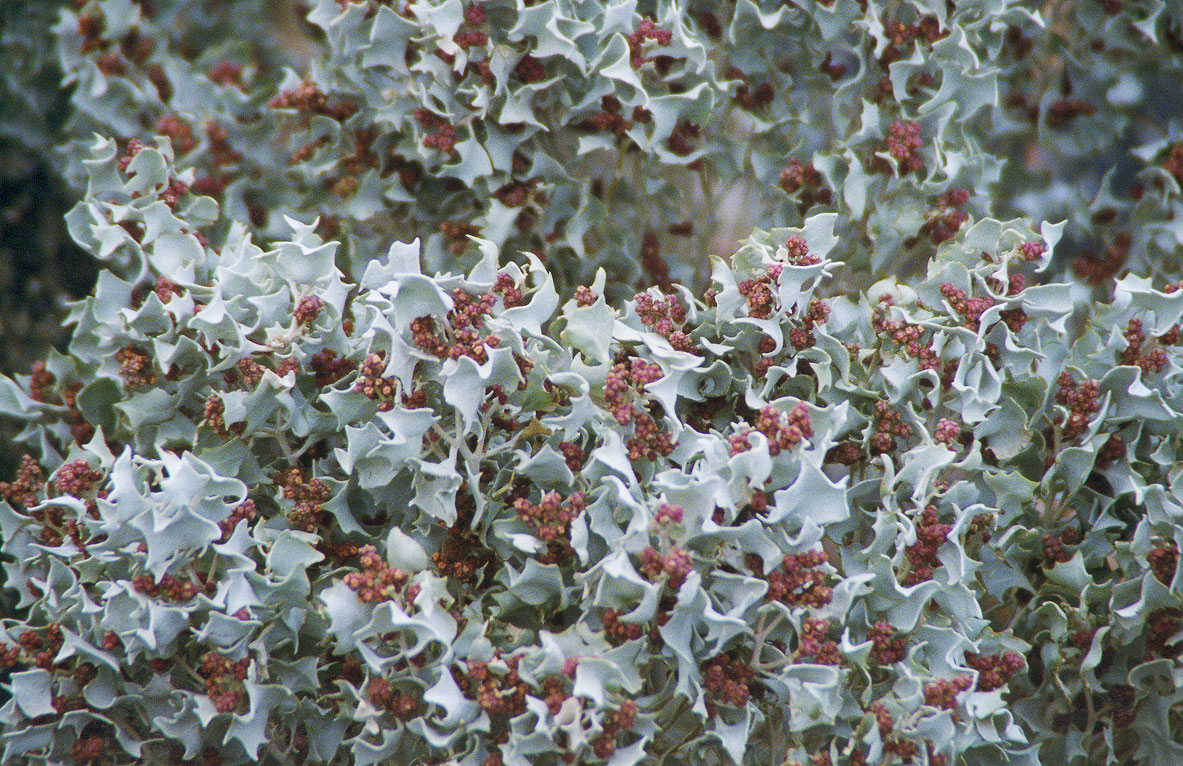

Scientific classification
- Kingdom: Plantae
- Clade: Embryophytes
- Clade: Tracheophytes
- Clade: Angiosperms
- Clade: Eudicots
- Order: Caryophyllales
- Family: Amaranthaceae
- Genus: Atriplex
- Species: A. hymenelytra

Binomial name
- Atriplex hymenelytra Torr. ex S.Wats.

= Atriplex hymenelytra =

Desert holly

Species of flowering plant

Atriplex hymenelytra, the desert holly, is silvery-whitish-gray shrub in the family Amaranthaceae, native to deserts of the southwestern United States. It is the most drought tolerant saltbush in North America. It can tolerate the hottest and driest sites in Death Valley, and remains active most of the year.

The common name refers to the leaves that are shaped similar to holly, but the plants are not related. The toothed leaves and the small reddish fruits borne on the plant give it a passing resemblance to the unrelated European holly.

== Range and habitat ==
Desert holly grows in alkaline locations such as desert dry wash and creosote bush scrub in the Mojave Desert and Sonoran Desert down to Baja California. In the Sonoran Desert it grows in northwestern Mexico, western Arizona, and southeastern California to southwestern Utah, and can be found at elevations ranging from 250 to 3,900 feet (76 to 1,189 m).

With dry soil, it can survive temperatures as low as −10 °F (−23 °C); however, it dies if the ground freezes.

== Description ==
=== Growth pattern ===
Atriplex hymenelytra is generally a compact, rounded bush, 8 to 48 inches (20 to 122 cm) tall, covered in distinctive reflective silver-gray, twisted, oblong, many-pointed leaves. It drops its leaves drought deciduous in extreme drought conditions.

It tolerates alkaline soil, salt and sand. The leaves accumulate salts which helps extract water from the soil when other plants cannot. Salt is shed by dropping the leaves. It can live in up to 30 ppm Boron in solution, compared to most plants which can tolerate only about 1-5 ppm. As with other desert climate members of the genus Atriplex, it uses water conserving C4 photosynthesis, and it removes salts by having bladders in the leaves that keep the salt from the plant cells.

=== Roots, stems, and leaves ===
Oval to round, 1/4 to 3/8 inch (0.64 to 0.95 cm), silvery-gray leaves have a whitish reflective coating of tiny gray to white scales, and are shaped like twisted or wavy holly leaves, with toothed margins. The silvery color is from salts that collect on surface hairs. This helps reflect the light and thereby reduce the amount of water lost.

=== Inflorescence and fruit ===
It blooms from January to April in the Sonoran Desert.

Plants are either male or female in their natural dry, desert habitat. When artificially transplanted to cooler and wetter climates, male and female flowers may occur on the same plant.

Female flowers are green.

Green or red fruits occur in dense clusters enclosed in disc-shaped leaf-like bracts, with the 2 round bracteoles pressed together, after flowering.

== Human uses ==
Plants were once used as Christmas decorations by drying and dying them. The plants are not a protected species in most habitats.
