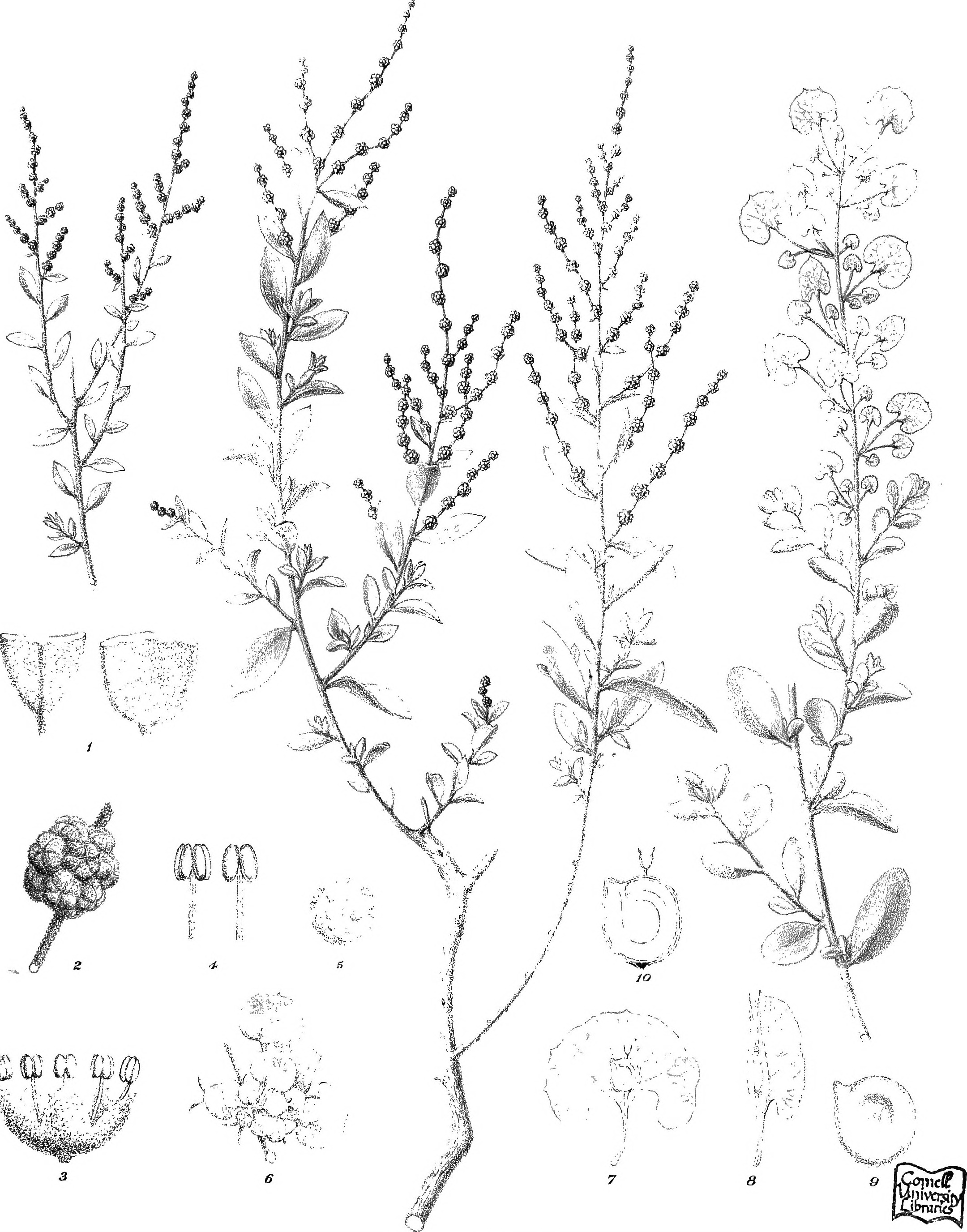

Scientific classification
- Kingdom: Plantae
- Clade: Tracheophytes
- Clade: Angiosperms
- Clade: Eudicots
- Order: Caryophyllales
- Family: Amaranthaceae
- Genus: Atriplex
- Species: A. stipitata

Binomial name
- Atriplex stipitata Benth.

Synonyms
- Atriplex reniformis F.Muell.; Obione stipitata (Benth.) G.L.Chu

= Atriplex stipitata =

Species of plant

Atriplex stipitata, commonly known as mallee saltbush, bitter saltbush and kidney saltbush, is a species of shrub in the family Amaranthaceae, found in all mainland states of Australia.

In South Australia, it flowers all year round, however in other states generally flowers from spring through to autumn. A. stipitata is not considered a threatened species.

== Description ==
Atriplex stipitata is an erect, generally dioecious, shrub which grows to 1 meter (3.3 ft) in height. Its leaves are elliptic and entire, with the apices either obtuse or rounded. The leaf blade is 7 to 25 mm long on a petiole which is 2 to 3 mm long. Male flowers form disjunct spikes, and the well-spaced clusters of female flowers form slender spikes. Bracteoles surround a superior ovary, on a slender stipe which is up to 1 cm long. A. stipitata generally flowers from spring through to autumn. The common name 'kidney saltbush' is derived from the kidney shape of the fruits. When in season, the distinctive fruits make it easily identified.

In 2020, N.G.Walsh & Sluiter described a sub species of A. stipitata. This sub species, miscella, presents as a monoecious plant. This sub species varies to the dioecious form. It is distinguished by having finer stems with narrow leaves. It is an erect and gracile shrub and is not as robust as the dioecious taxa with a shorter lifespan. Miscella grows from 60–100 centimeters (24–39 in) with sparser stems, making it a more narrow shrub than the sub species stipitatas which is often wider than it is tall.

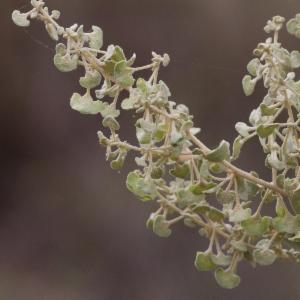
Kidney shaped fruits distinctive to Atriplex stipitata

== Taxonomy and naming ==
George Bentham first described A. stipitata in 1870. The specific epithet, stipitata, is a Latin adjective (past participle) meaning "stemmed", that is, "having a stipe or a stem", and refers to the stemmed fruit.

There are 2 subspecies of A. stipitata in the Flora of Victoria as listed below

- Atriplex stipitata subsp. miscella N.G.Walsh & Sluiter
- Atriplex stipitata subsp. stipitata

The epithet, miscella, is a Latin word meaning “mixed”, believed to be referring to the mixed male and female flowers presented together.

== Distribution and occurrence ==
A. stipitata is widely spread across Australia, found in all mainland states. It is most abundant in semi arid and arid zones of inland parts of South Australia and Western New South Wales. Although A. stipitata has been observed in numerous different habitats, it predominately occurs in the mallee region of Victoria and South Australia and in open wooded areas.

Western Australia – subsp. stipitata is commonly found in the south-western region. Subsp. miscella remains rare, with only a single collection.

Northern Territory – subsp. miscella is the more common species found in Northern Territory, however both species are present in the southern regions.

South Australia – subsp. stipitata can be found in all mainland regions of South Australia except the south-east. Subsp. miscella is currently limited to the Flinders Ranges and Murray Mallee regions.

Queensland – subsp. miscella is the more common species in Queensland, however both species are relatively rare in the state, appearing only in the Warrego Pastoral District.

New South Wales – both subsp's are similarly dispersed across western New South Wales.

Victoria – subsp. stipitata occurs in the far north-west and near Bacchus Marsh. Subsp. miscella is limited to the far north-west.

Seeds from the A. stipitata can be distributed worldwide. A. stipitata has been introduced to the California coastline in the United States of America to aid in the rehabilitation of saline soils.

== Habitat ==
A. stipitata prefers saline soils of clay loam and coarse textured soils. It is often sighted in areas with solonized brown soils which are high in calcium and magnesium carbonate, and thrives in eroded red soils when there is limited competition from other species. A.stipitata subsp stipitata is more frequently observed in mixed chenopod shrublands and has a stronger affinity to saline soils whereas subsp miscella is more commonly observed in open woodlands. A. stipitata survives well in dry degraded soils and has been reportedly sighted in creek banks, stony flats, slopes and ridges, flat plains and outwash plains.

== Uses ==
=== Traditional ===
A. stipitata, also known as bitter saltbush, is one of the lesser consumed saltbush due to its bitter flavour. However, saltbush was used for traditional medicinal purposes. The leaves of saltbush plants were ground down and mixed with water to form a saline solution used to clean and disinfect mild skin conditions and wounds.

=== Agricultural ===
A. stipitata performs well on agricultural land, as it is not the most palatable of the saltbush species. This species only becomes favourable to sheep and livestock when other forage is scarce. A. stipitata is high in potassium, nitrogen and protein with high digestibility making it suitable for agriculture grazing, however the high sodium content in the plant make it only desirable when there is water readily available. Agriculture farmers have observed a link to saltbush grazing and an increase in milk production and more successful birth rates in sheep. This is attested not only to the nutrient value of the plant, but also to the increased water intake of the sheep when grazing.
