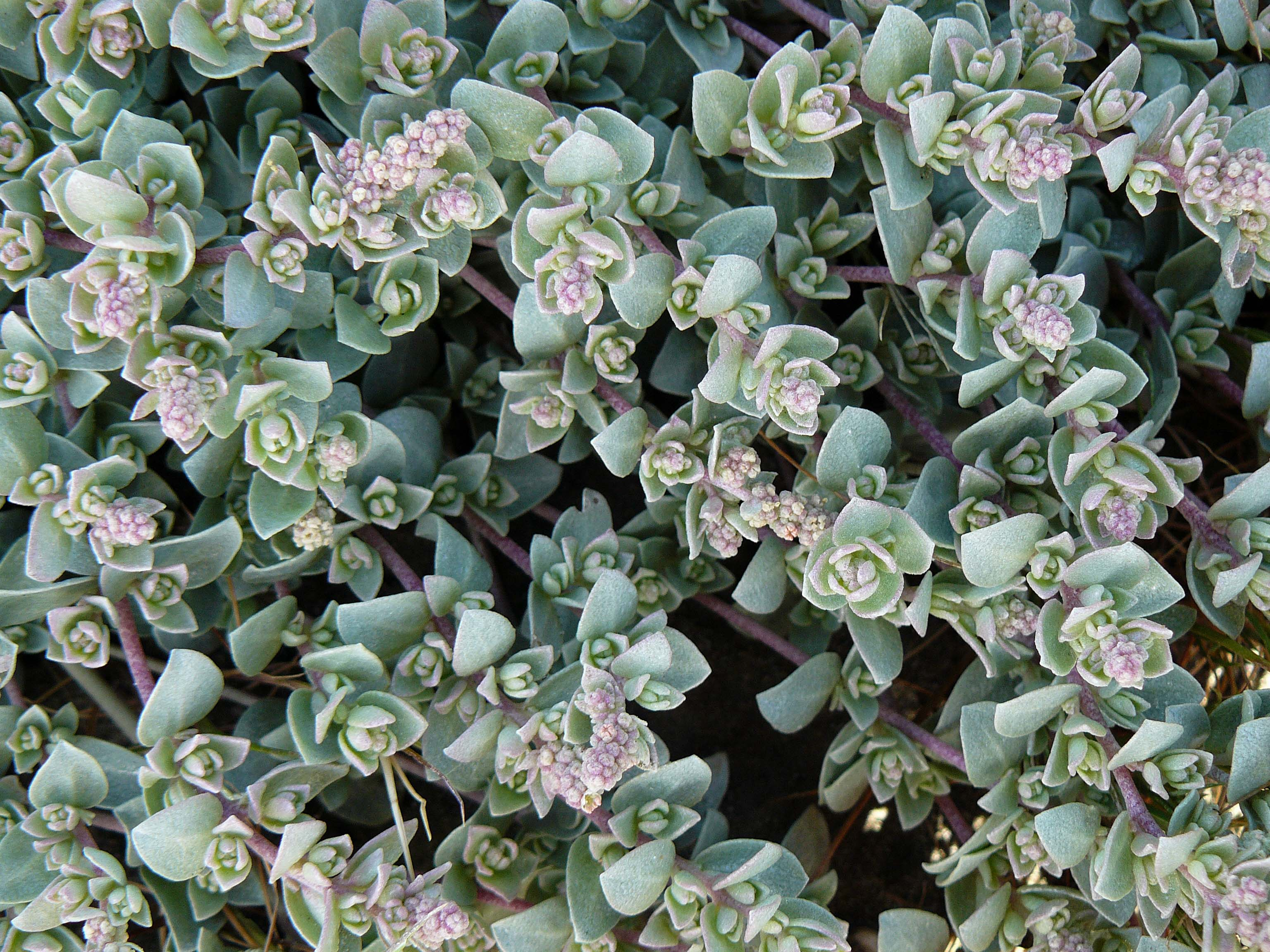
- Atriplex watsonii - Morro Bay Calif. Salt Marsh. Grows in densely tangled mats.

Scientific classification
- Kingdom: Plantae
- Clade: Tracheophytes
- Clade: Angiosperms
- Clade: Eudicots
- Order: Caryophyllales
- Family: Amaranthaceae
- Genus: Atriplex
- Species: A. watsonii

Binomial name
- Atriplex watsonii A.Nels.

= Atriplex watsonii =

Species of aquatic plant

Atriplex watsonii is a species of saltbush known by the common name Watson's saltbush, or Watson's orach. It is native to the coastline of California and Baja California, where it grows in coastal areas with saline soils, such as salt marshes and beach scrub, with other halophytes such as saltgrass. It extends inland in the Los Angeles Basin, and along the Santa Ana River.

== Description ==
This is a gray-green to whitish perennial herb with tangled slender stems under a meter in length. It grows in mats up to 3 meters wide. The thick, fleshy, crusty leaves are up to 2.5 centimeters long and generally oval in shape.

The plant is dioecious, with individuals bearing either male or female flowers. The male flowers grow in clusters or long spikes, and the female flowers can be found in small clusters in the leaf axils.

The plant is part of the Chenopodiaceae family
