= Atriplex phyllostegia =

Scientific classification
- Kingdom: Plantae
- Clade: Tracheophytes
- Clade: Angiosperms
- Clade: Eudicots
- Order: Caryophyllales
- Family: Amaranthaceae
- Genus: Atriplex
- Species: A. phyllostegia

Binomial name
- Atriplex phyllostegia (Torr. ex S.Wats.) S.Wats.

Species of flowering plant

Atriplex phyllostegia is a species of saltbush known by the common names arrowscale, leafcover saltweed, and Truckee orach. It is native to the western United States from California to Utah, where it grows in meadow bottoms and areas with saline soils such as dry or ephemeral lakes.

== Description ==
This is an annual herb with a mainly erect branching green stem growing up to 40 centimeters tall. The distinctive leaves are fleshy and diamond or arrowhead-shaped and 1 to 4 centimeters long. The plant is generally monoecious, although some individuals bear only female flowers.

Male and female flowers appear in the leaf axils, and the male flowers are sometimes borne in spikelike inflorescences. The female flower clusters are enclosed in bracteoles which may be up to 2 centimeters long and resemble the leaves.
