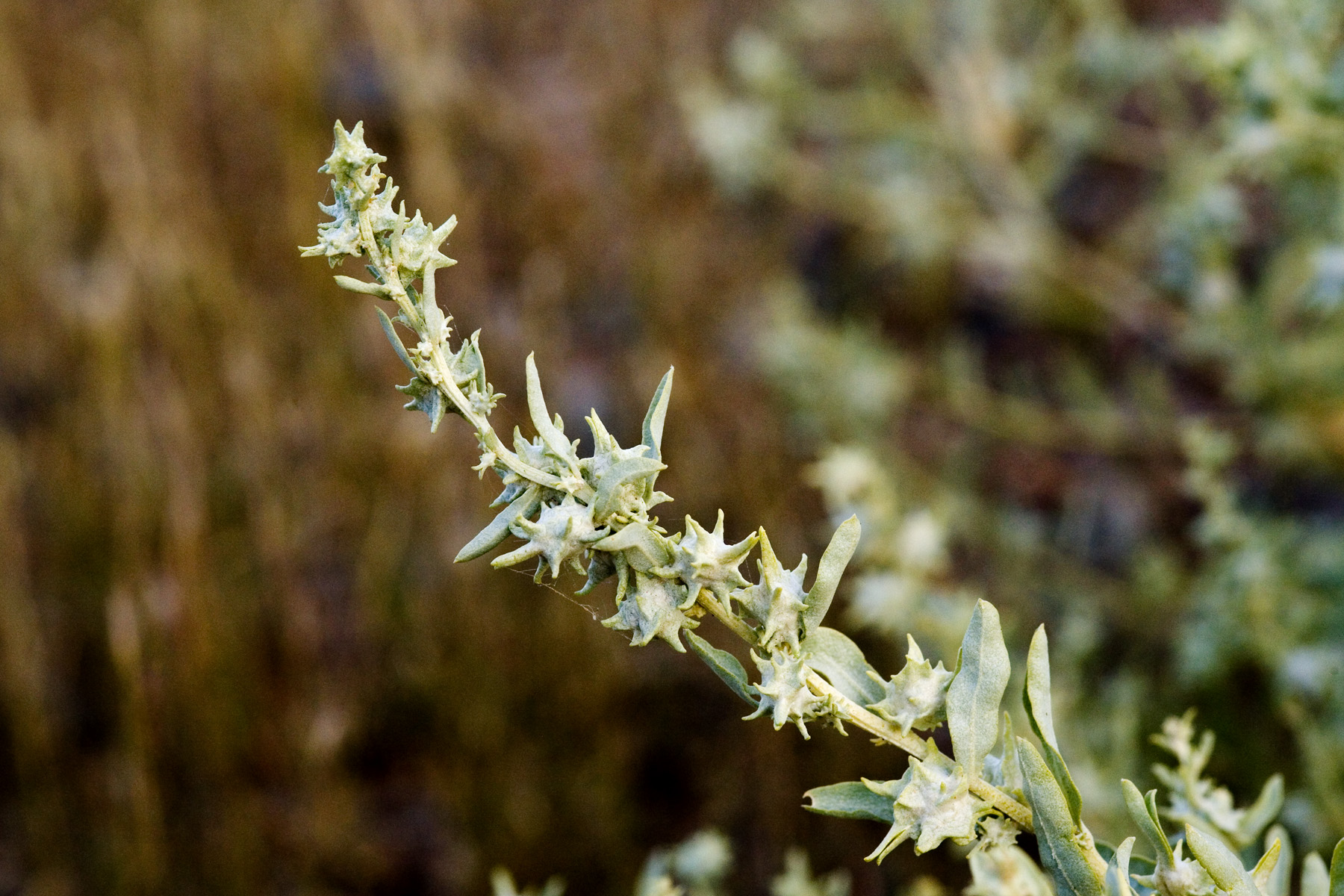
- Atriplex acanthocarpa in New Mexico

Conservation status
- Apparently Secure (NatureServe)

Scientific classification
- Kingdom: Plantae
- Clade: Tracheophytes
- Clade: Angiosperms
- Clade: Eudicots
- Order: Caryophyllales
- Family: Amaranthaceae
- Genus: Atriplex
- Species: A. acanthocarpa

Binomial name
- Atriplex acanthocarpa (Torr.) S.Watson

= Atriplex acanthocarpa =

Species of flowering plant

Atriplex acanthocarpa is a species of flowering plant in the amaranth family known by the common names armed saltbush, tubercled saltbush, and huaha. It is native to North America, where it is limited to the US states of Arizona, New Mexico, and Texas, and adjacent Mexico.

This species is a shrub or subshrub producing stems with woody bases growing up to about a meter tall by a meter wide. It has a woody root. It is evergreen, the leaves persisting through the seasons. They are oppositely arranged basally and alternately arranged toward the ends of the stems. The leaf blades are variable in shape and size, growing up to 5 centimeters long. The plant is dioecious, with male and female flowering parts on separate plants. Male flowers are borne in spikes and female flowers are borne in axillary clusters or spikelike inflorescences. The fruits have tubercles up to 8 millimeters long.

This species is well-adapted to saline soils, and it can be planted on salty and alkaline substrates.

This species blooms in late summer through the fall.
