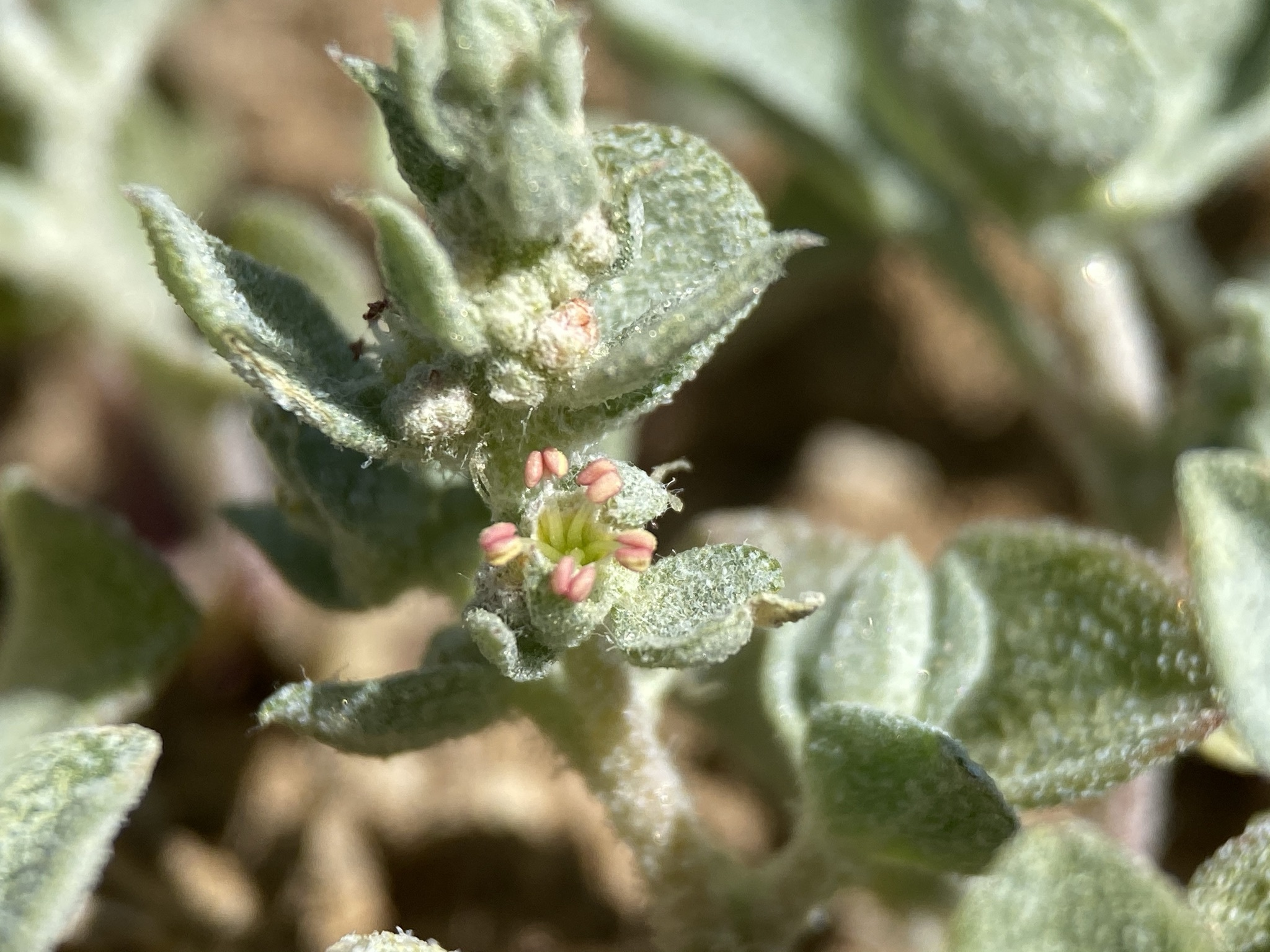
- Atriplex powellii flowering near Malheur, Oregon

Conservation status
- Apparently Secure (NatureServe)

Scientific classification
- Kingdom: Plantae
- Clade: Tracheophytes
- Clade: Angiosperms
- Clade: Eudicots
- Order: Caryophyllales
- Family: Amaranthaceae
- Genus: Atriplex
- Species: A. powellii

Binomial name
- Atriplex powellii S. Watson

= Atriplex powellii =

Species of flowering plant

Atriplex powellii, or Powell's saltweed, is a plant found in the United States and Canada.

== Uses ==
Among the Zuni people, the seeds were eaten raw before the presence of corn and afterwards. They are also ground with corn meal and made into a mush.
