= Atriplex parryi =

Scientific classification
- Kingdom: Plantae
- Clade: Tracheophytes
- Clade: Angiosperms
- Clade: Eudicots
- Order: Caryophyllales
- Family: Amaranthaceae
- Genus: Atriplex
- Species: A. parryi

Binomial name
- Atriplex parryi S.Watson

Species of flowering plant

Atriplex parryi is a species of saltbush known by the common name Parry's saltbush. It is native to the deserts and plateaus of eastern California and western Nevada.

It is a plant of alkaline and saline soils in habitats such as salt flats, where it grows with other halophytes such as Nitrophila.

== Description ==
This is a small, stiff, spiny shrub growing to a maximum height near 50 centimeters. Its scaly, sharp-pointed stems tangle to give the plant a generally rounded form. It is covered densely in small gray-green oval-shaped leaves up to 2 centimeters long. The shrub is dioecious, with individuals producing either male or female flowers. Both flower types are borne in long clusters interspersed with leaves.

This species blooms from April to October.
