= Atriplex lanfrancoi =

Conservation status
- Endangered (IUCN 3.1)

Scientific classification
- Kingdom: Plantae
- Clade: Embryophytes
- Clade: Tracheophytes
- Clade: Spermatophytes
- Clade: Angiosperms
- Clade: Eudicots
- Order: Caryophyllales
- Family: Amaranthaceae
- Genus: Atriplex
- Species: A. lanfrancoi

Binomial name
- Atriplex lanfrancoi (Brullo & Pavone) G.Kadereit & Sukhor.

Synonyms
- Cremnophyton lanfrancoi Brullo & Pavone

Species of plant

Atriplex lanfrancoi, also known as the Maltese cliff orache, is a species of plant in the family Amaranthaceae. It is perennial, evergreen, branched, woody shrub. It is endemic to Malta, where it is found on sheer cliffs along the coasts of the islands of Malta and Gozo. It never occurs further than 100 m from the cliffside. The Maltese cliff orache is listed as being endangered on the IUCN Red List. It was formerly assessed as being critically endangered. The species has a very restricted and fragmented range and its preferred habitat is threatened by natural erosion, limestone quarrying, and pollution caused by waste dumping. Its wild population is expected to number in the several thousands and is thought to be declining.

== Taxonomy ==
It was described in the monotypic genus Cremnophyton, but was moved to Atriplex in 2010 based on genetic evidence. It has ten chromosomes.

== Description ==
The orache is perennial, evergreen, woody shrub that grows branches.

== Distribution and habitat ==
The Maltese cliff orache is endemic to Malta, where it is found on sheer cliffs along the southern and southwestern coasts of the island of Malta, as well the western and northwestern coasts of Gozo and on Fungus Rock. It prefers the lower parts of limestone cliffs and is occasionally found on plateaus along the tops of cliffs, but never occurs further than 100 m from the cliffside.

== Ecology ==
The plant has very low reproductive success in the wild due to infection by insects and parasitic fungi. A species of gall midge, Asphondylia scopuli, induces the growth of bud galls 4–5 mm across in the leaf axils. The midge's larvae are parasitized by two wasps, Mesopolobus melitensis and an unknown Eurytoma species, the latter of which feeds on the seeds on the orache. Wild plants are also commonly infected by an unidentified fungus that reduces reproductive success, with captive plants uninfected by the fungus propagating easily through cuttings.

== Conservation ==
The Maltese cliff orache is listed as being endangered on the IUCN Red List. It was formerly assessed as being critically endangered. The species has a very restricted and fragmented range, with its total area of occupancy estimated to be 64 km^{2} and its extent of occurrence estimated to be 159 km^{2}. Its preferred habitat is threatened by natural erosion, limestone quarrying, and pollution caused by waste dumping. Its wild population is expected to number in the several thousands, but comprehensive surveys have not been carried out die to the inaccessibility of the cliffside habitats the orache inhabits. The species has recently been found in new localities and is thought to be slightly expanding its range, but habitat loss caused by both natural and anthropogenic cliff collapse is causing a decline in its population. The plant is also threatened by the spread of invasives like century plant, Indian fig opuntia, erect prickly pear, and hottentot fig.

The orache is listed in Annexes II and IV of the Habitats Directive and Appendix I of the Bern Convention. The species is nationally protected in Malta and most of the localities it occurs in are protected as part of the Natura 2000 network. The species can be propagated via its cuttings very easily, but is not a commonly traded ornamental.
