= Atriplex australasica =

Scientific classification
- Kingdom: Plantae
- Clade: Tracheophytes
- Clade: Angiosperms
- Clade: Eudicots
- Order: Caryophyllales
- Family: Amaranthaceae
- Genus: Atriplex
- Species: A. australasica

Binomial name
- Atriplex australasica Moq.

Synonyms
- Atriplex patula var. gunnii Aellen; Atriplex patula var. serratifolia Aellen

Species of plant in the amaranth family

Atriplex australasica, the native orache, is a species of annual flowering plant in the family Amaranthaceae, native to southeastern Australia. A variable species, it is found in coastal areas and other wet, brackish situations.
