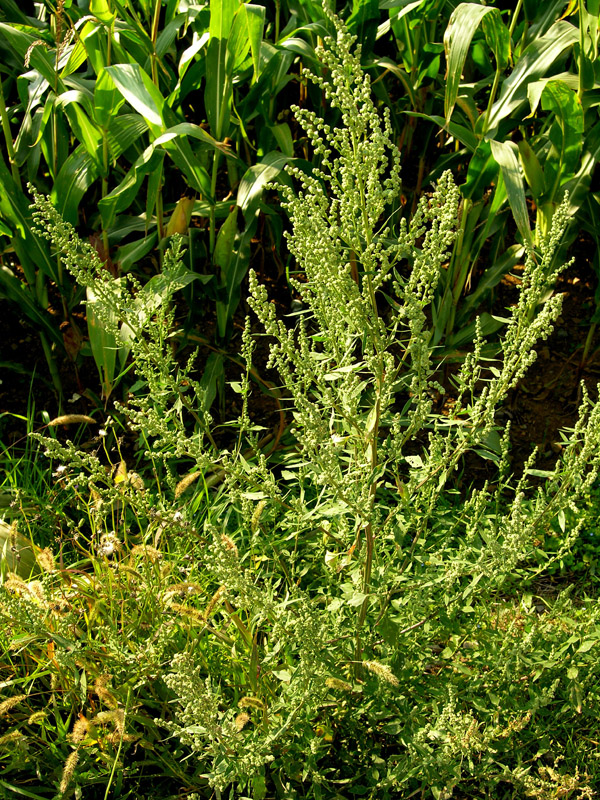

Conservation status
- Secure (NatureServe)

Scientific classification
- Kingdom: Plantae
- Clade: Embryophytes
- Clade: Tracheophytes
- Clade: Spermatophytes
- Clade: Angiosperms
- Clade: Eudicots
- Order: Caryophyllales
- Family: Amaranthaceae
- Genus: Atriplex
- Species: A. patula

Binomial name
- Atriplex patula L.

= Atriplex patula =

Species of flowering plant

Atriplex patula (spear saltbush; common orache; spear orach; spreading orach; /ˈɒrətʃ/) is a ruderal, circumboreal species of annual herbaceous plant in the genus Atriplex naturalized in many temperate regions.

== Description ==
Atriplex patula grows to be between 50 and 80 centimetres (20 and 31 inches) tall. The branches extend outwards from the stem with rhomboid leaves and separated clusters of flowers. The species accumulates salt from the environment in its tissues. Unlike other Atriplex species, it lacks notable salt bladders to excrete salt onto the leaves.

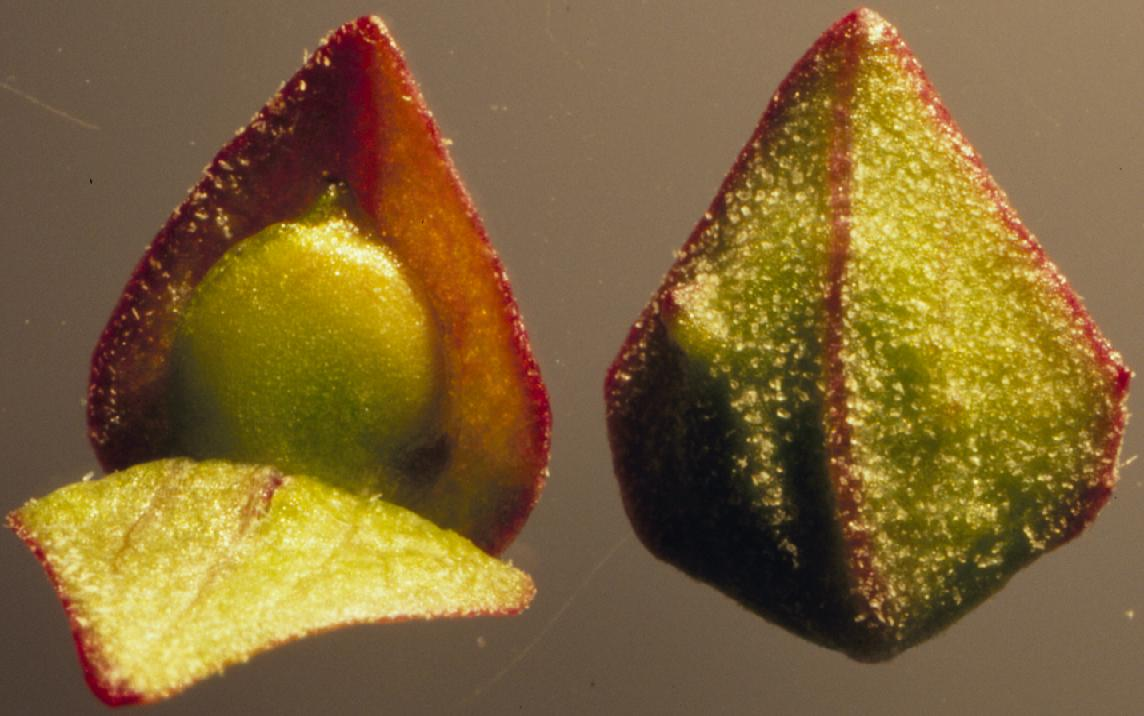
Atriplex patula, female flower with bracteoles and seed

== Taxonomy ==
The species was a member of the family Chenopodiaceae, now part of Amaranthaceae, the amaranth family.

== Distribution and habitat ==
The species has a wide range, including semi-arid deserts and coastal areas in Asia, North America, Europe, and Africa. It commonly grows along roads and waste sites.

Although it is commonly asserted that the species has been naturalized in North America only since the 18th century, seeds ascribed to this species occur on the west coast of North America in buried marsh deposits that predate European contact.

== Uses ==
The young leaves and shoots are edible raw or cooked and suffice as a spinach substitute, but are bland on their own.

The species has been proven to be effective in lowering salt content in soils when planted in areas with high road salt contamination.
