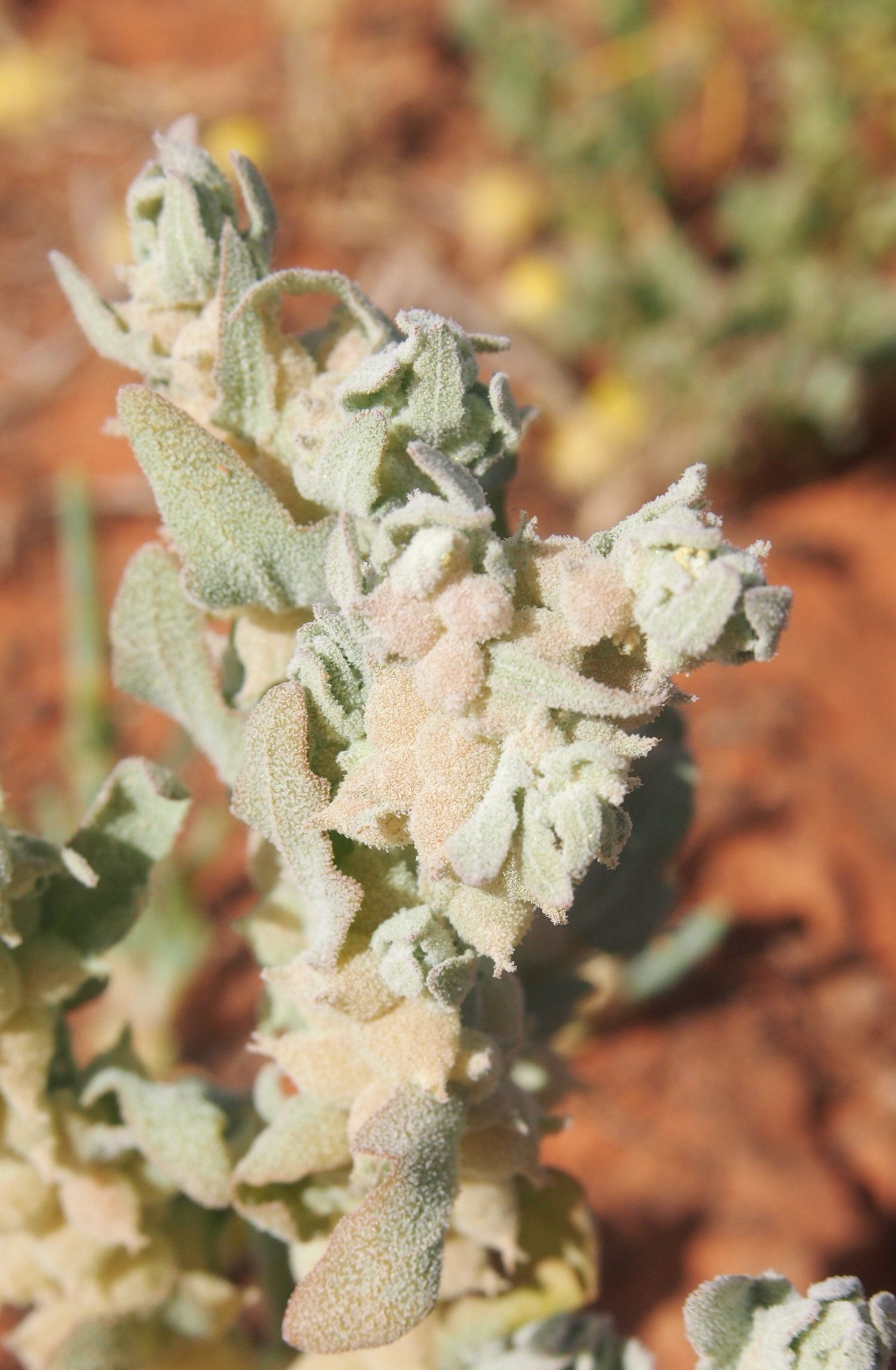
- Atriplex fissivalvis fruit
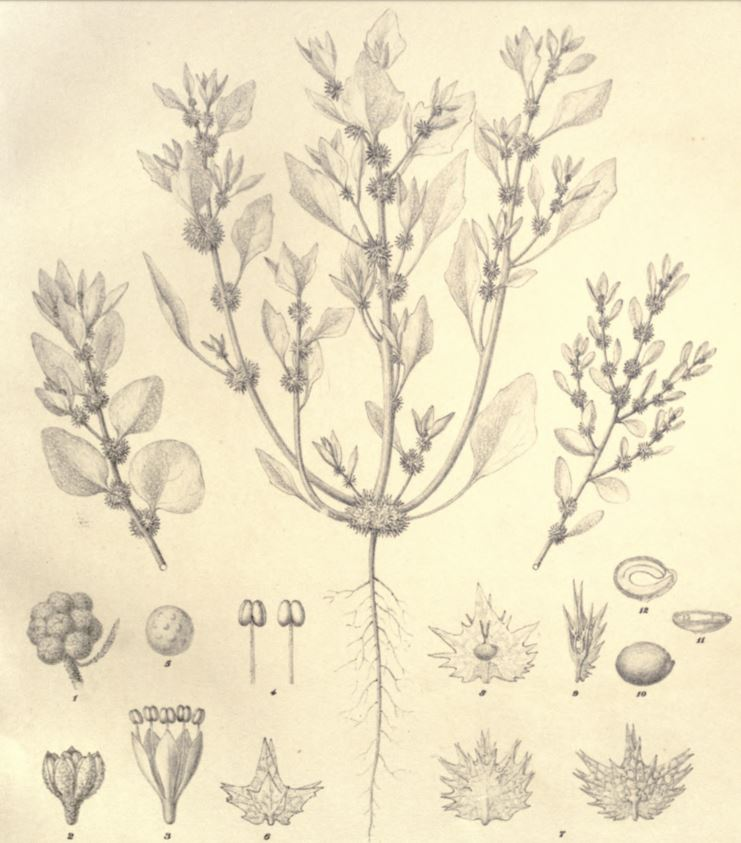
- from Mueller 1889

Scientific classification
- Kingdom: Plantae
- Clade: Tracheophytes
- Clade: Angiosperms
- Clade: Eudicots
- Order: Caryophyllales
- Family: Amaranthaceae
- Genus: Atriplex
- Species: A. fissivalvis

Binomial name
- Atriplex fissivalvis F.Muell.
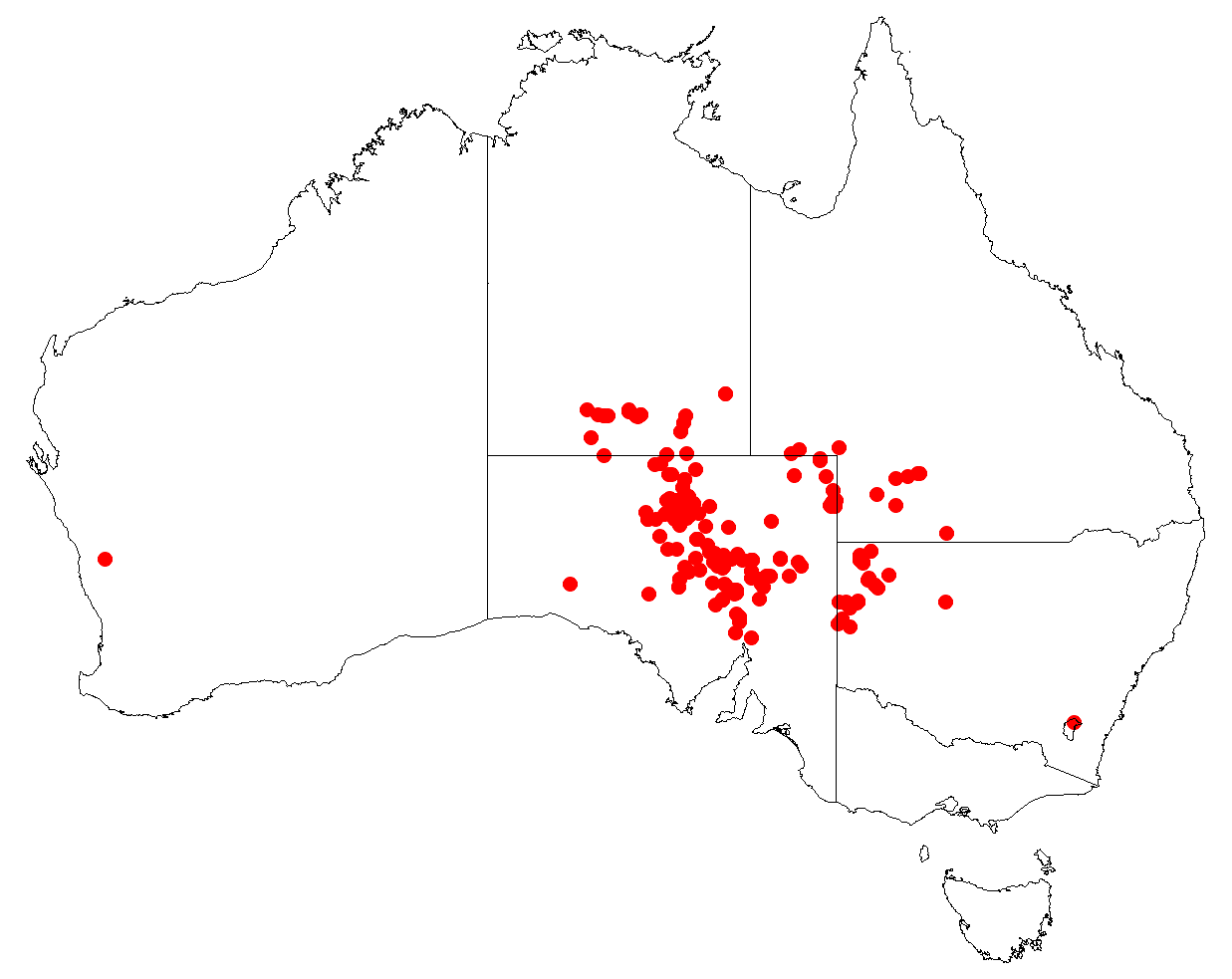
- Occurrence data from AVH

Synonyms
- Haloxanthium fissivalve (F.Muell.) Ulbr. Obione fissivalvis (F.Muell.) G.L.Chu

= Atriplex fissivalvis =

Species of plant

Atriplex fissivalvis, commonly known as gibber saltbush, is a plant species in the family Amaranthaceae, subfamily, Chenopodioideae. It occurs in the Australian states of South Australia, New South Wales, Queensland and the Northern Territory.

== Description ==
Atriplex fissivalvis is an annual monoecious herb 10–30 centimetres (4–12 in) high, which branches from the base. The leaves (on a stalk of 5–10 millimetres (0.2–0.4 in)) are about 20 millimetres (1 in) long, with toothed or sinuate margins and an acute apex. It flowers in clusters in the axils of leaves, from June to November (in the Northern Territory). Fruiting is from June to November (in the Territory), and the fruit is without a stem and enclosed in bracteoles.

== Distribution ==
In the Northern Territory it is found in the IBRA regions of Finke, MacDonnell Ranges, Simpson Strzelecki Dunefields, and Stony Plains.

== Taxonomy & naming ==
Atriplex fissivalvis was first described by Mueller in 1875. The specific epithet, fissivalvis, comes from the Latin, fissus (cleft) and -valvis (-valved), giving "split-valved".

== Similar taxa ==
"Atriplex fissivalvis could be confused with A. lobativalvis, however the latter has fruiting bracteoles that lack appendages on the dorsal surface, are prominently keeled or have a raised area on the lower dorsal surface, have margins that are fused for over one-third their length, and has a preference for freshwater swamps and claypans."

== Conservation status ==
The Northern Territory lists this species as "Near Threatened" under the TPWCA act.
