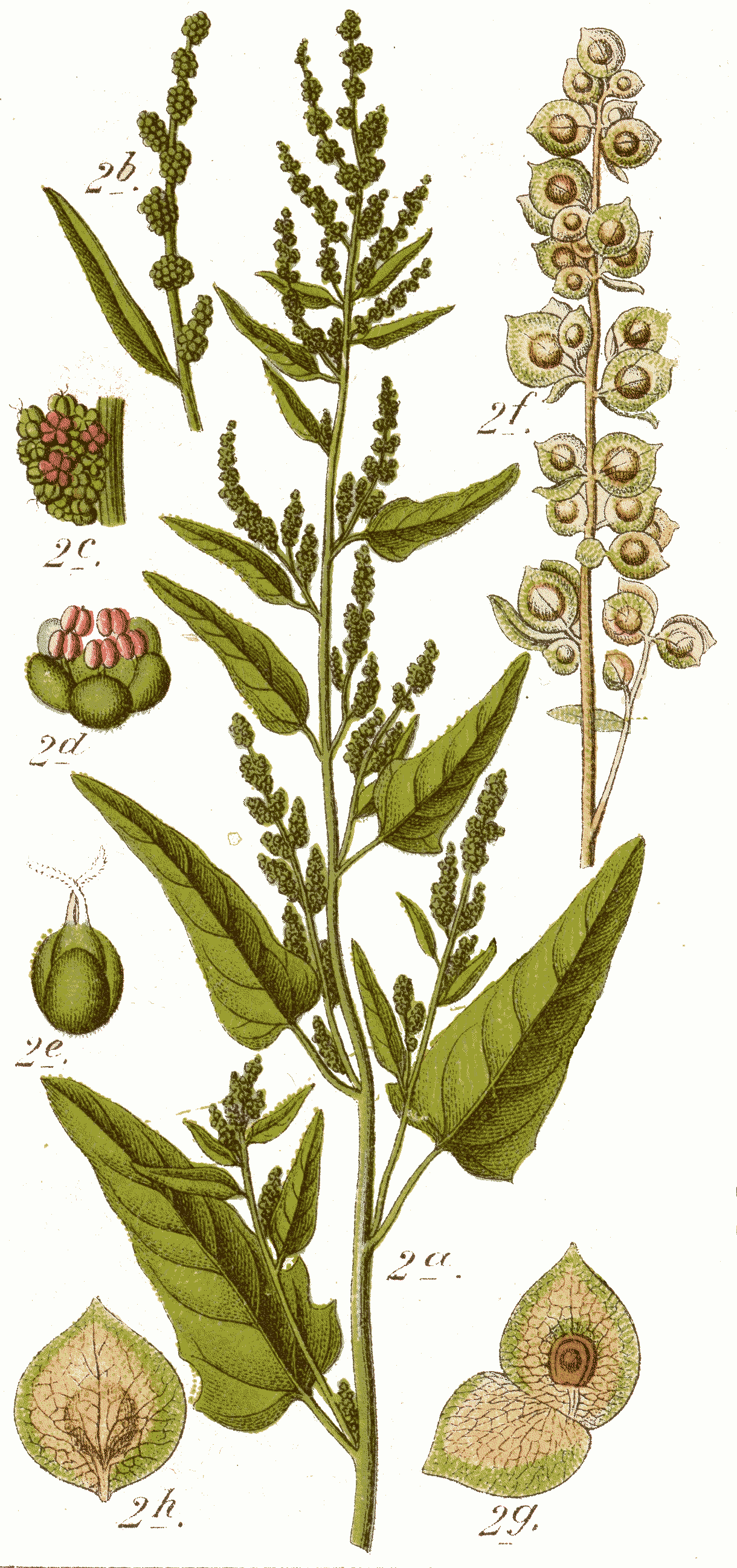
- Garden orache (Atriplex hortensis); From Sturm & Sturm (1796): Deutschlands Flora in Abbildungen.

Scientific classification
- Kingdom: Plantae
- Clade: Tracheophytes
- Clade: Angiosperms
- Clade: Eudicots
- Order: Caryophyllales
- Family: Amaranthaceae
- Subfamily: Chenopodioideae
- Tribe: Atripliceae
- Genus: Atriplex; L.

Type species
- Atriplex hortensis L.

Species
- See List of Atriplex species

Synonyms
- List: Armola (Kirschl.) Montandon Blackiella Aellen Cremnophyton Brullo & Pavone Halimione Aellen Halimus Wallr. Haloxanthium Ulbr. Lophocarya Nutt. ex Moq. Morrisiella Aellen Neopreissia Ulbr. Obione Gaertn. Pachypharynx Aellen Phyllocarpa Nutt. ex Moq. Pterocarya Nutt. ex Moq. Pterochiton Torr. & Frém. Schizotheca (C.A.Mey.) Lindl. Senniella Aellen Sukhorukovia Vasjukov Teutliopsis (Dumort.) Celak. Theleophyton Moq.

= Atriplex =

Genus of flowering plant

Atriplex (/ˈætrɪplɛks/) is a plant genus of about 250 species, known by the common names of saltbush and orache (/ˈɒrɪtʃ, -ətʃ/; also spelled orach). It belongs to the subfamily Chenopodioideae of the family Amaranthaceae s.l.. The genus is quite variable and widely distributed. It includes many desert and seashore plants and halophytes, as well as plants of moist environments. The generic name originated in Latin and was applied by Pliny the Elder to the edible oraches. The name saltbush derives from the fact that the plants retain salt in their leaves; they are able to grow in areas affected by soil salination.

== Description ==
Species of plants in genus Atriplex are annual or perennial herbs, subshrubs, or shrubs. The plants are often covered with bladderlike hairs, that later collapse and form a silvery, scurfy or mealy surface, rarely with elongate trichomes. The leaves are arranged alternately along the branches, rarely in opposite pairs, either sessile or on a petiole, and are sometimes deciduous. The leaf blade is variably shaped and may be entire, tooth or lobed.

The flowers are borne in leaf axils or on the ends of branches, in spikes or spike-like panicles. The flowers are unisexual, some species monoecious, others dioecious. Male flowers have three to five perianth lobes and three to five stamens. Female flowers are usually lacking a perianth, but are enclosed by two leaf-like bracteoles, have a short style and two stigmas.

After flowering, the bracteoles sometimes enlarge, thicken or become appendaged, enclosing the fruit but without adhering to it.

The chromosome base number is x = 9, except for Atriplex lanfrancoi, which is x=10.

A few Atriplex species are C_{3}-plants, but most species are C_{4}-plants, with a characteristic leaf anatomy, known as kranz anatomy.

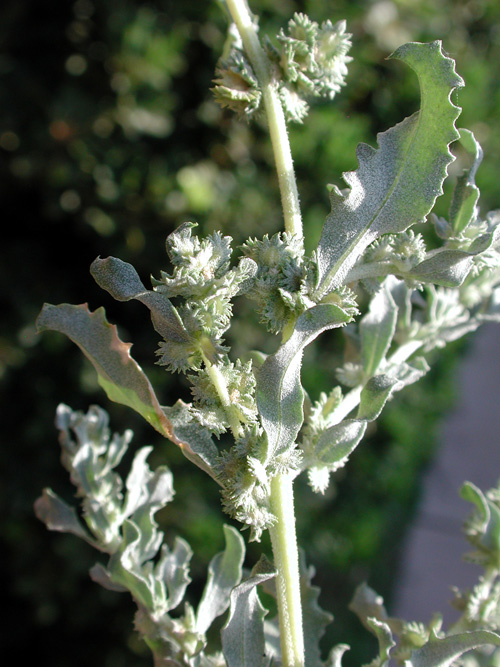
Atriplex elegans

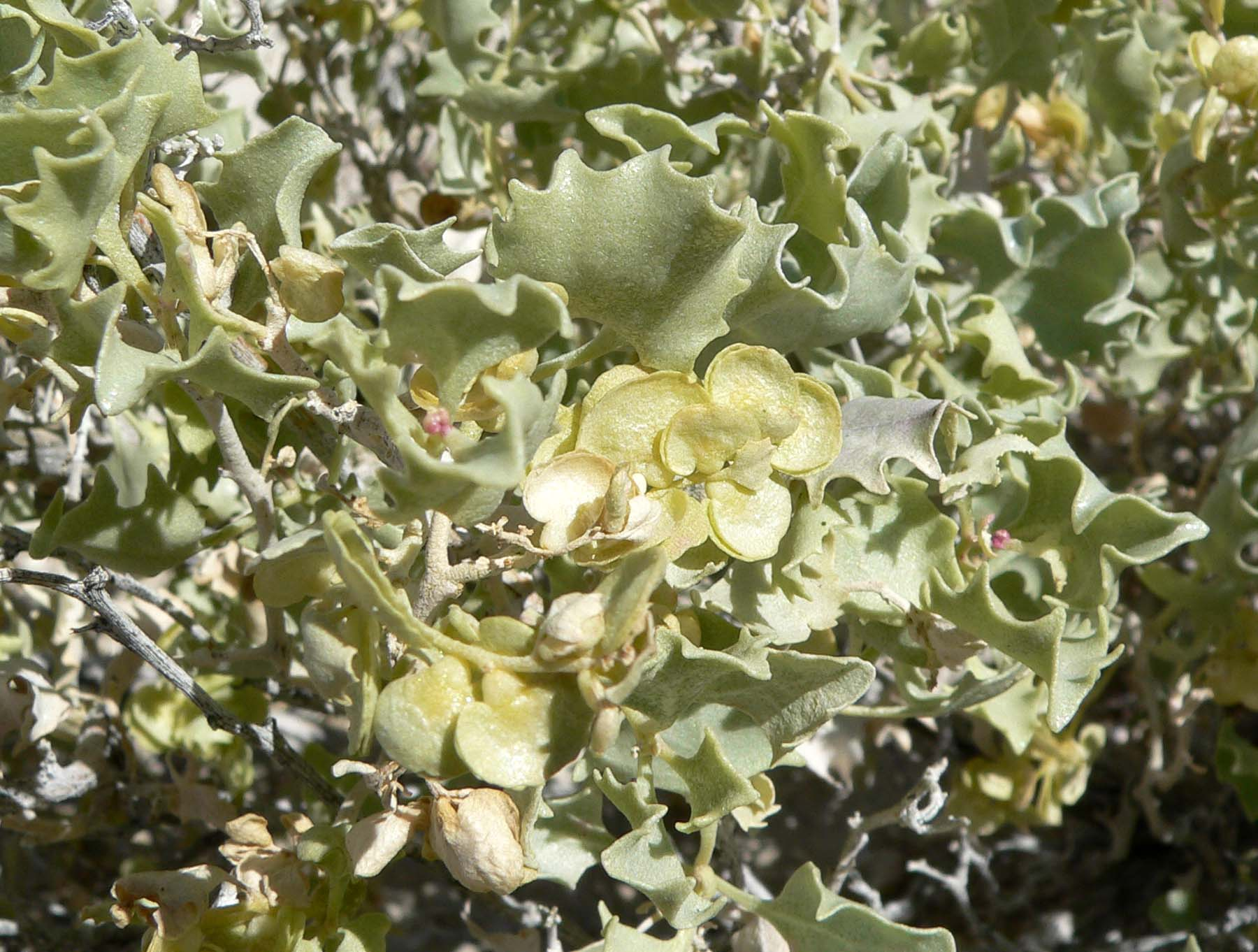
Atriplex hymenelytra

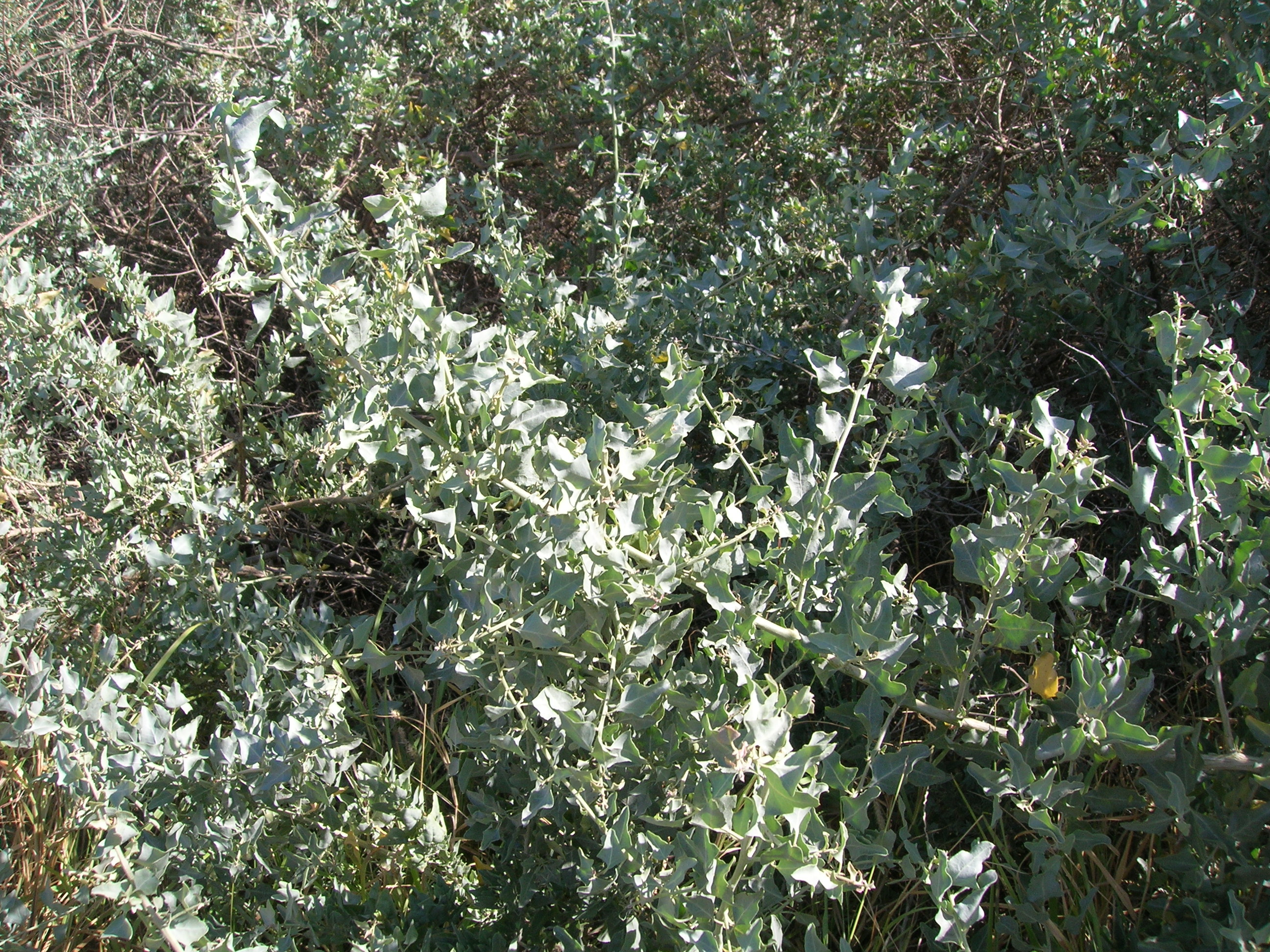
Atriplex lentiformis

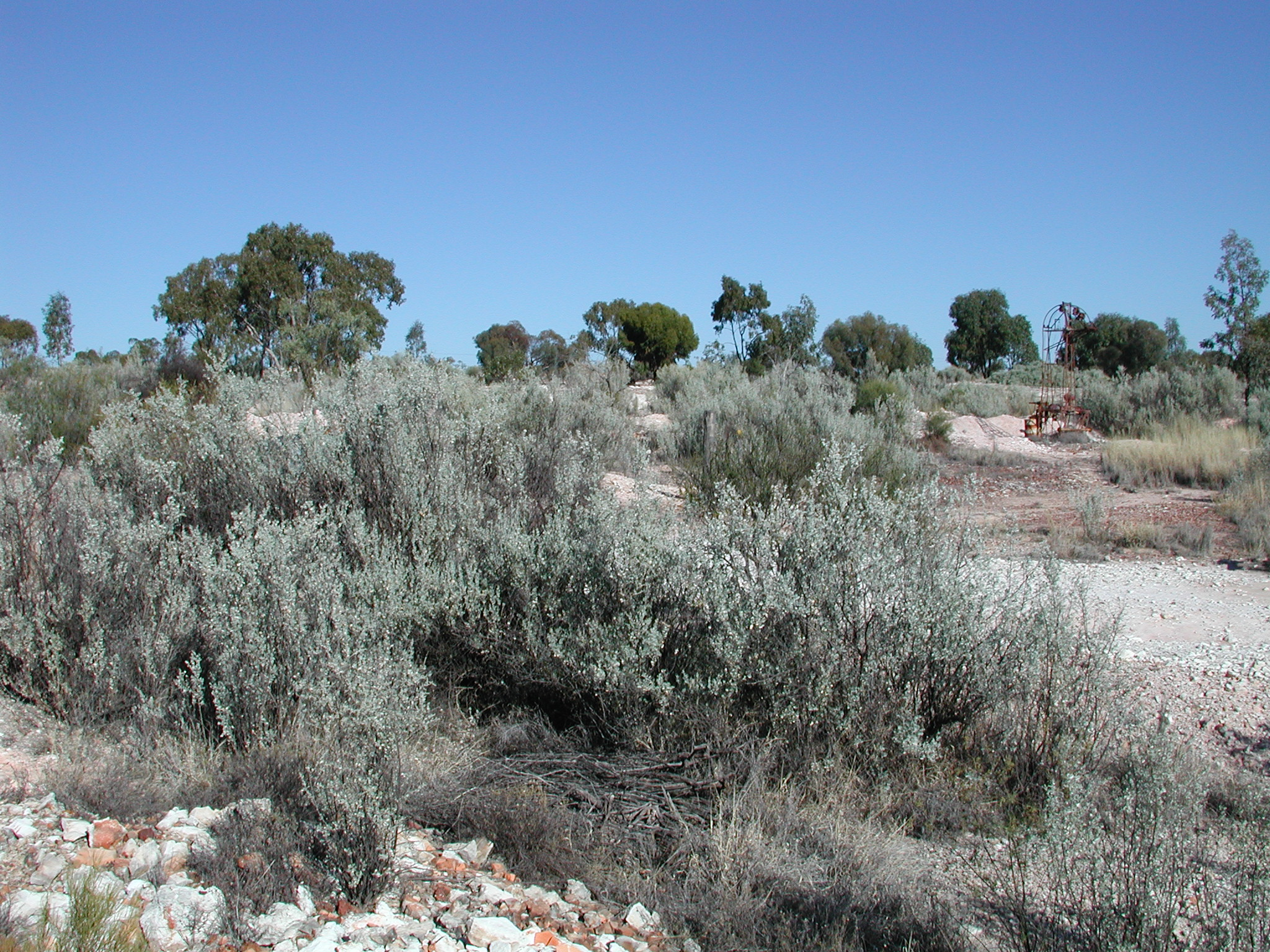
Atriplex nummularia

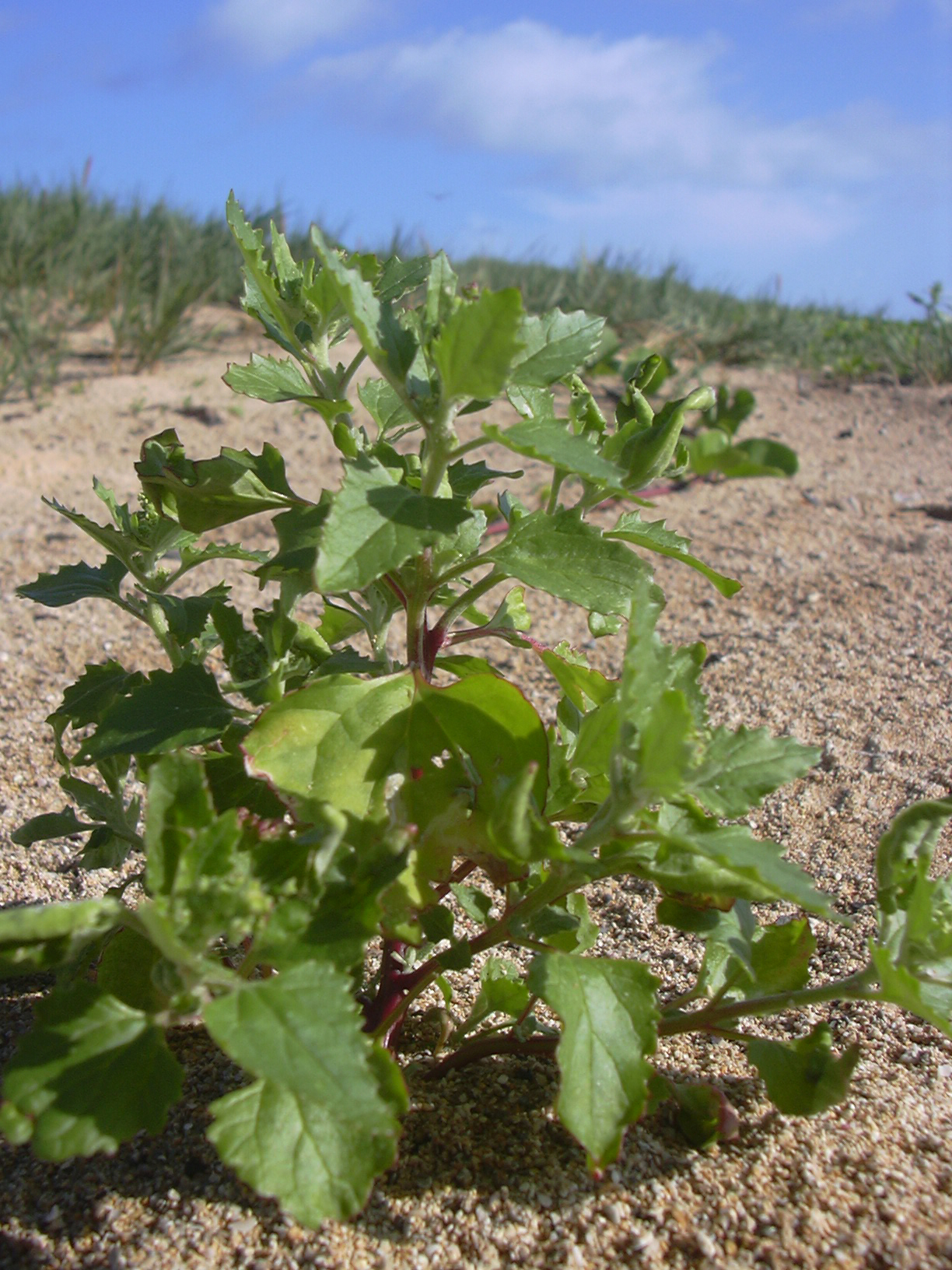
Atriplex suberecta

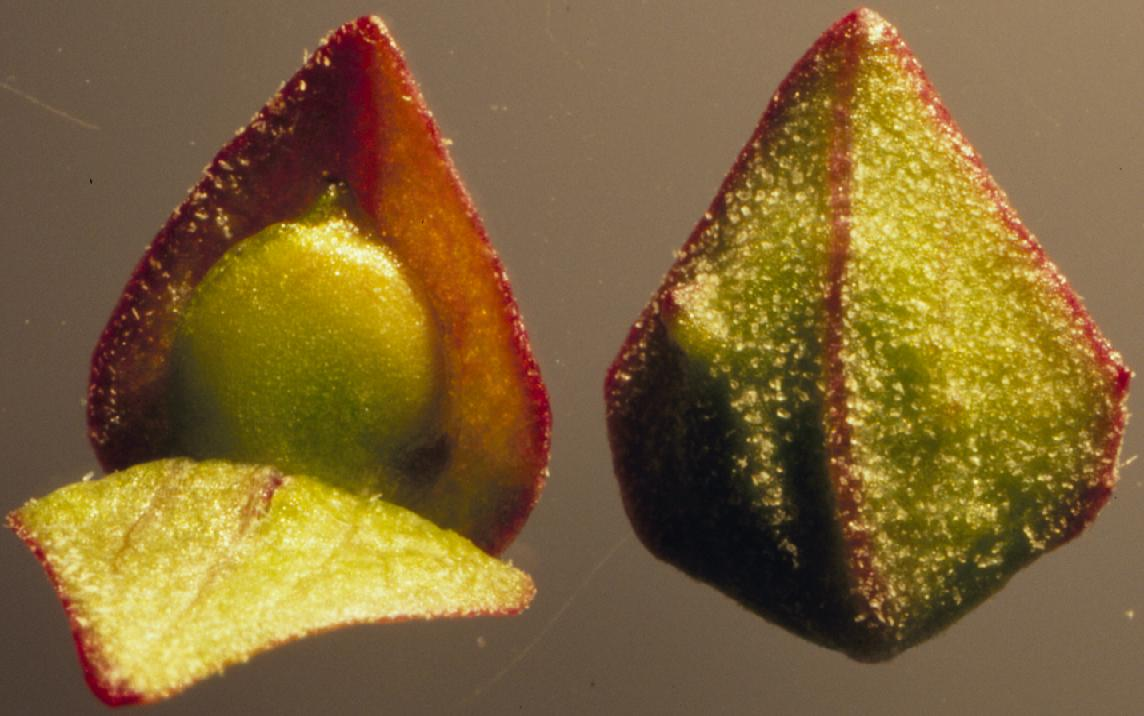
Atriplex patula, female flower with bracteoles and ovule

== Taxonomy ==
The genus Atriplex was first formally described in 1753 by Carl Linnaeus in Species Plantarum. The genus name was used by Pliny for orach, or mountain spinach (A. hortensis).

The genus evolved in Middle Miocene, the C_{4}-photosynthesis pathway developed about 14.1–10.9 million years ago (mya), when the climate became increasingly dry. The genus diversified rapidly and spread over the continents. The C_{4} Atriplex colonized North America probably from Eurasia during the Middle/Late Miocene, about 9.8–8.8 mya, and later spread to South America. Australia was colonized twice by two C_{4} lineages, one from Eurasia or America about 9.8–7.8 mya, and one from Central Asia about 6.3–4.8 mya. The last lineage diversified rapidly, and became the ancestor of most Australian Atriplex species.

The type species (lectotype) is Atriplex hortensis. The name is derived from Ancient Greek ἀτράφαξυς (atraphaxys), "orach", itself a Pre-Greek substrate loanword. Atriplex is an extremely species-rich genus and comprises about 250-300 species, with new species still being discovered. An example includes Atriplex yeelirrie, formally described in 2015.

Traditional taxonomy of Atripliceae based on morphological features has been controversial. Molecular studies have found that many genera are not true clades. One such study found that Atripliceae could be divided into two main clades, Archiatriplex, with a few, scattered species, and the larger Atriplex clade, which is highly diverse and found around the world. After phylogenetic research, Kadereit et al. (2010) excluded Halimione as a distinct sister genus. The remaining Atriplex species were grouped into several clades.

The following is a cladogram with estimated divergence times for the tribe Atripliceae. To infer the phylogeny, an ITS matrix composed of spacer ITS-1, the 5.8S subunit, and spacer ITS-2 were amplified and sequenced for each specimen. Not all species in the genus Atriplex are presented in the cladogram (based on page 7 of). This work suggested that the Americas were colonised by C4 Atriplex from Eurasia or Australia. Furthermore, that in the Americas Atriplex first appeared in South America, where two lineages underwent in situ diversification and evolved sympatrically. North America was then colonised by Atriplex from South America, then one lineage later moved back to South America.

Cladogram of estimated divergences within the genus Atriplex

Background colour in cladogram represents the region where a species is endemic. South America North America Australia Eurasia

Brignone et al. (2019) hypothesis for the evolution and movement of Atriplex species globally.

- Atripliceae
  - Atriplex
    - - - - - - - - - - - - - ⊞(15 more species, click to view)
                              ⊟
                              - - Atriplex pentandra
                                - - Atriplex hystrix
                                  - - Atriplex clivicola
                                    - - Atriplex taltalensis
                                      - - Atriplex vallenarensis
                                        - Atriplex peruviana
                              - - - Atriplex leuca
                                  - - Atriplex philippii
                                    - - Atriplex myriophylla
                                      - - Atriplex chapinii
                                        - - Atriplex chizae
                                          - - Atriplex frigida
                                            - Atriplex ameghinoi
                                - - Atriplex monevidensis
                                  - Atriplex pamparum
                            - Atriplex serenana
                          - - Atriplex leucophylla
                            - Atriplex watsonii
                        - - - Atriplex acanthocarpa
                            - Atriplex polycarpa
                          - - - Atriplex canescens
                              - Atriplex phyllostegia
                            - - Atriplex obovata
                              - Atriplex powellii
                      - Atriplex parishii
                    - - Atriplex hymenelytra
                      - Atriplex parryi
                  - Atriplex lentiformis
                - - - - - - - - Atriplex undulata
                              - - Atriplex patagonica
                                - - Atriplex lithophila
                                  - Atriplex atacamensis
                            - - - Atriplex braunii
                                - Atriplex oreophila
                              - - - Atriplex retusa
                                  - - Atriplex rusbyi
                                    - Atriplex quixadensis
                                - - Atriplex sagittifolia
                                  - Atriplex vulgatissima
                          - - Atriplex cordubensis
                            - Atriplex lampa
                        - Atriplex crenatifolia
                      - - - Atriplex coquimbana
                          - - Atriplex costellata
                            - Atriplex repanda
                        - - Atriplex sorianoi
                          - Atriplex spegazzinii
                    - - Atriplex boecheri
                      - Atriplex nitrophiloides
                  - - Atriplex rotundifolia
                    - Atriplex imbricata
            - - - Atriplex argentina
                - Atriplex oesteophora
              - Atriplex asplundii
          - - - Atriplex cinerea
              - Atriplex rhagodioides
            - - Atriplex isatidea
              - Atriplex nummularia
        - - Atriplex halimus
          - Atriplex leucoclada
      - - - - - - - - Atriplex billardierei
                    - - Atriplex holocarpa
                      - Atriplex vesicaria
                  - Atriplex spongiosa
                - - Atriplex semibaccata
                  - - Atriplex muelleri
                    - - Atriplex suberecta
                      - Atriplex eardleyae
              - - - Atriplex centralasiatica
                  - Atriplex siberirica
                - - Atriplex rosea
                  - Atriplex sphaeromorpha
            - - - Atriplex dimorphostegia
                - Atriplex laciniata
              - Atriplex tatarica
          - Atriplex moneta
        - C3 Atriplex clade
          - - sect. Teutliopsis
              - - - - Atriplex australasica
                    - Atriplex glabriuscula
                  - Atriplex micrantha
                - - Atriplex latifolia
                  - Atriplex oblongifolia
              - - - Atriplex calotheca
                  - Atriplex prostrata
                - - Atriplex patula
                  - Atriplex chilensis
            - sect. Atriplex
              - Atriplex aucherii
              - Atriplex hortensis
          - Atriplex crassifolia
    - - Atriplex lanfrancoi
      - Atriplex cana
  - Halimione
    - Halimione portulacoides
    - Halimione verrucifera
- Archiatriplex clade
  - Extriplex californica
  - (13 other taxa)

Clades of Atriplex
- Atriplex lanfrancoi/cana-Clade:
  - Atriplex lanfrancoi (Brullo & Pavone) G. Kadereit et Sukhor. (Syn.: Cremnophyton lanfrancoi Brullo & Pavone): endemic to Malta and Gozo.
  - Atriplex cana C.A. Mey.: from Eastern European Russia to western China.
- Atriplex section Atriplex: annual C_{3}-plants.
  - Atriplex aucheri Moq.: in Eastern Europe and West Asia.
  - Atriplex hortensis L. – Garden orache, red orach, mountain spinach, French spinach: in Asia, cultivated or naturalized in Europe.
  - Atriplex oblongifolia Waldst. & Kit. – Oblong-leaved orache: in Eurasia.
  - Atriplex sagittata Borkh. (Syn.: Atriplex nitens Schkuhr): in Eurasia
- Atriplex section Teutliopsis Dumort.: annual C_{3}-plants.
  - Atriplex australasica Moq.
  - Atriplex calotheca (Rafn) Fr.: in Northern Europe.
  - Atriplex davisii Aellen: from southern Europe to Egypt.
  - Atriplex glabriuscula Edmondston – Northeastern saltbush, Babington's orache, smooth orache, Scotland orache, glabrous orache: In central and northern Europe.
  - Atriplex gmelinii C.A. Mey. ex Bong. – Gmelin's saltbush: in Asia and North America.
  - Atriplex intracontinentalis Sukhor.: from Central Europe to Asia.
  - Atriplex laevis C.A. Mey.: in Asia, naturalized in eastern Europe.
  - Atriplex latifolia Wahlenb.: in Eurasia.
  - Atriplex littoralis L. – Grass-leaved orache: in Eurasia and North Africa.
  - Atriplex longipes Drejer – Long-stalked orache: in northern Europe.
  - Atriplex micrantha C.A. Mey.: in Asia, naturalized in Europe.
  - Atriplex nudicaulis Boguslaw – Baltic saltbush: in Eurasia.
  - Atriplex patula L. – Common orache, spreading orache: in Eurasia and North Africa.
  - Atriplex praecox Hülph. – Early orache: in northern Europe.
  - Atriplex prostrata Moq. – Spear-leaved orache, thin-leaved orache, triangle orache, fat hen: in Eurasia and North Africa.
- C_{4}-Atriplex-Clade: containing the majority of species. The traditional classification into sections (sect. Obione, sect. Pterochiton, sect. Psammophila, sect. Sclerocalymma, sect. Stylosa) did not reflect the phylogenetical relationships and was rejected by Kadereit et al. (2010).
  - Atriplex acanthocarpa (Torr.) S. Watson: in North America.
  - Atriplex acutibractea Anderson: in Australia.
  - Atriplex altaica Sukhor.: in Asia.
  - Atriplex angulata Benth.: in Australia.
  - Atriplex billardierei (Moq.) Hook. f.: in Australia.
  - Atriplex canescens (Pursh) Nutt. – Chamiso, chamiza, four-winged saltbush, grey sagebrush: in North America.
  - Atriplex centralasiatica Iljin: in Asia.
  - Atriplex cinerea Poir. – Grey saltbush, truganini: in Australia
  - Atriplex codonocarpa P.G. Wilson: in Australia.
  - Atriplex conduplicata F. Muell.: in Australia.
  - Atriplex confertifolia (Torr. & Frém.) S. Watson – Shadscale (saltbush): in North America.
  - Atriplex cordobensis Gand. & Stuck.: in South America.
  - Atriplex deserticola Phil.: in South America.
  - Atriplex dimorphostegia Kar. & Kir.: in North Africa.
  - Atriplex eardleyae Aellen: in Australia
  - Atriplex elachophylla F. Muell.: in Australia.
  - Atriplex fissivalvis F. Muell.: in Australia
  - Atriplex flabellum Bunge ex Boiss.: in Eurasia.
  - Atriplex gardneri (Moq.) D. Dietr. – Gardner's saltbush, moundscale: in North America
  - Atriplex glauca L.: in Portugal, Spain and in North Africa.
  - Atriplex halimus L. – Mediterranean saltbush, sea orache, shrubby orache: in south Europe, North Africa and southwest Asia.
  - Atriplex herzogii Standl.: in North America.
  - Atriplex holocarpa F. Muell.: in Australia.
  - Atriplex hymenelytra (Torr.) S. Watson – Desert holly: in North America.
  - Atriplex hymenotheca Moq.: in Australia.
  - Atriplex imbricata (Moq.) D. Dietr.: in South America.
  - Atriplex inamoena Aellen: in Eurasia.
  - Atriplex intermedia Anderson: in Australia.
  - Atriplex isatidea Moq.: in Australia.
  - Atriplex laciniata L. – Frosted orache: In western and northern Europe.
  - Atriplex lampa (Moq.) Gillies ex Small: in South America.
  - Atriplex lehmanniana Bunge: in Eurasia.
  - Atriplex lentiformis (Torr.) S. Watson – Quail bush: in North America.
  - Atriplex leptocarpa F. Muell.: in Australia.
  - Atriplex leucoclada Boiss.: in Eurasia.
  - Atriplex leucophylla (Moq.) D. Dietr.: in North America
  - Atriplex lindleyi Moq.: in Australia.
  - Atriplex moneta Bunge ex Boiss.: in Eurasia.
  - Atriplex muelleri Benth.: in Australia.
  - Atriplex nessorhina S.W.L. Jacobs: in Australia.
  - Atriplex nummularia Lindl. – Old man saltbush, giant saltbush: in Australia.
  - Atriplex obovata Moq.: in North America.
  - Atriplex pamirica Iljin: in Eurasia.
  - Atriplex parishii S. Watson: in North America
  - Atriplex parryi S. Watson: in North America
  - Atriplex parvifolia Kunth: in South America.
  - Atriplex patagonica (Moq.) D. Dietr.: in South America.
  - Atriplex phyllostegia (Torr. ex S. Watson) S. Watson: in North America.
  - Atriplex polycarpa (Torr.) S. Watson – Allscale (saltbush), desert saltbush, cattle saltbush, cattle spinach: in North America.
  - Atriplex powellii S. Watson – Powell's saltbush: in North America.
  - Atriplex pseudocampanulata Aellen: in Australia.
  - Atriplex quinii F. Muell.: in Australia.
  - Atriplex recurva d'Urv.: in Eurasia, endemic to areas around the Aegean.
  - Atriplex rhagodioides F. Muell.: in Australia.
  - Atriplex rosea L. – Tumbling orache: in Eurasia and North Africa.
  - Atriplex rusbyi Britton ex Rusby: in South America.
  - Atriplex schugnanica Iljin: in Asia.
  - Atriplex semibaccata R. Br. – Australian saltbush, berry saltbush, creeping saltbush: in Australia.
  - Atriplex semilunaris Aellen: in Australia.
  - Atriplex serenana A. Nelson ex Abrams: in North America
  - Atriplex sibirica L.; in Asia, naturalized in Europe.
  - Atriplex sphaeromorpha Iljin: in Russia, Ukraine and Caucasus.
  - Atriplex spinibractea Anderson: in Australia.
  - Atriplex spongiosa F. Muell.: in Australia.
  - Atriplex stipitata Benth.: in Australia.
  - Atriplex sturtii S.W.L. Jacobs: in Australia.
  - Atriplex suberecta I. Verd. – Sprawling saltbush, lagoon saltbush: in Australia.
  - Atriplex tatarica Aellen: in Europe, North Africa and Asia.
  - Atriplex turbinata (Anderson) Aellen: in Australia.
  - Atriplex undulata (Moq.) D. Dietr.: in South America.
  - Atriplex velutinella F. Muell.: in Australia.
  - Atriplex vesicaria Heward ex Benth. – Bladder saltbush: in Australia.

== Distribution and habitat ==
The genus Atriplex is distributed nearly worldwide from subtropical to temperate and to subarctic regions. Most species-rich are Australia, North America, South America and Eurasia. Many species are halophytes and are adapted to dry environments with salty soils.

== Ecology ==
Atriplex species are used as food plants by the larvae of some Lepidoptera species; see the list of Lepidoptera which feed on Atriplex. They are also sometimes consumed by camels. For spiders such as Phidippus californicus and other arthropods, saltbush plants offer opportunities to hide and hunt in habitat that is otherwise often quite barren. It has been proposed that genus Atriplex was a main food source in the diet of the extinct giant kangaroo Procoptodon goliah.

== Uses ==
The favored species for human consumption is now usually garden orache (A. hortensis), but many species are edible and the use of Atriplex as food is known since at least the late Epipaleolithic (Mesolithic).

Common orache (A. patula) is attested as an archaeophyte in northern Europe, and the Ertebølle culture is presumed to have used it as a food. Its seed has been found among apparent evidence of cereal preparation and cooking at Late Iron Age villages in Britain. Grey saltbush (A. cinerea) has been used as bushfood in Australia since prehistoric times. Chamiso (A. canescens) and shadscale (A. confertifolia) were eaten by Native Americans, and spearscale (A. hastata) was a food in rural Eurasia.

Studies on Atriplex species demonstrated their potential use in agriculture. Meat from sheep which have grazed on saltbush has surprisingly high levels of vitamin E, is leaner and more hydrated than regular lamb and has consumer appeal equal to grain-fed lamb. The vitamin E levels could have animal health benefits while extending the shelf-life and maintaining the fresh red colour of saltbush lamb. This effect has been demonstrated for old man saltbush (A. nummularia) and river saltbush (A. amnicola). For reasons unknown, sheep seem to prefer the more fibrous, less nutritious river saltbush.

A study on A. nummularia discovered the species have a nitrogen content of 2.5–3.5%, and could potentially be used as a protein supplement for grazing if palatable. A subsequent study allowed sheep and goats to voluntarily feed on Atriplex halimus and aimed to determine if the saltbush was palatable, and if so, did it provide enough nutrients to supplement the diet of these animals. In this study they determined when goats and sheep are given as much A. halimus as they like, they do obtain enough nutrients to supplement their diet – unless the animal requirements are higher during pregnancy and milk production.

Saltbushes are also used as an ornamental plant in landscaping and can be used to prevent soil erosion in coastal areas. Old man saltbush (Atriplex nummularia) has also been successfully used to rehabilitate old mining sites in Australia.

=== Safety ===
Sphaeraphides occur in the leaves, stem, pith and mesophloem.

== See also ==
- Barbara Hulme, producer of Atriplex hybrids

== Bibliography ==
- Davidson, Alan (1999): Orach. In: Oxford Companion to Food: 556. ISBN 0-19-211579-0
- Everitt, J.H.; Lonard, R.L.; Little, C.R. (2007). Weeds in South Texas and Northern Mexico. Lubbock: Texas Tech University Press. ISBN 0-89672-614-2
- Gulliver, George (1864). "Observations on Raphides and other Crystals". The Annals and Magazine of Natural History, Including Zoology, Botany, and Geology. Third Series. 14: 250–252.
