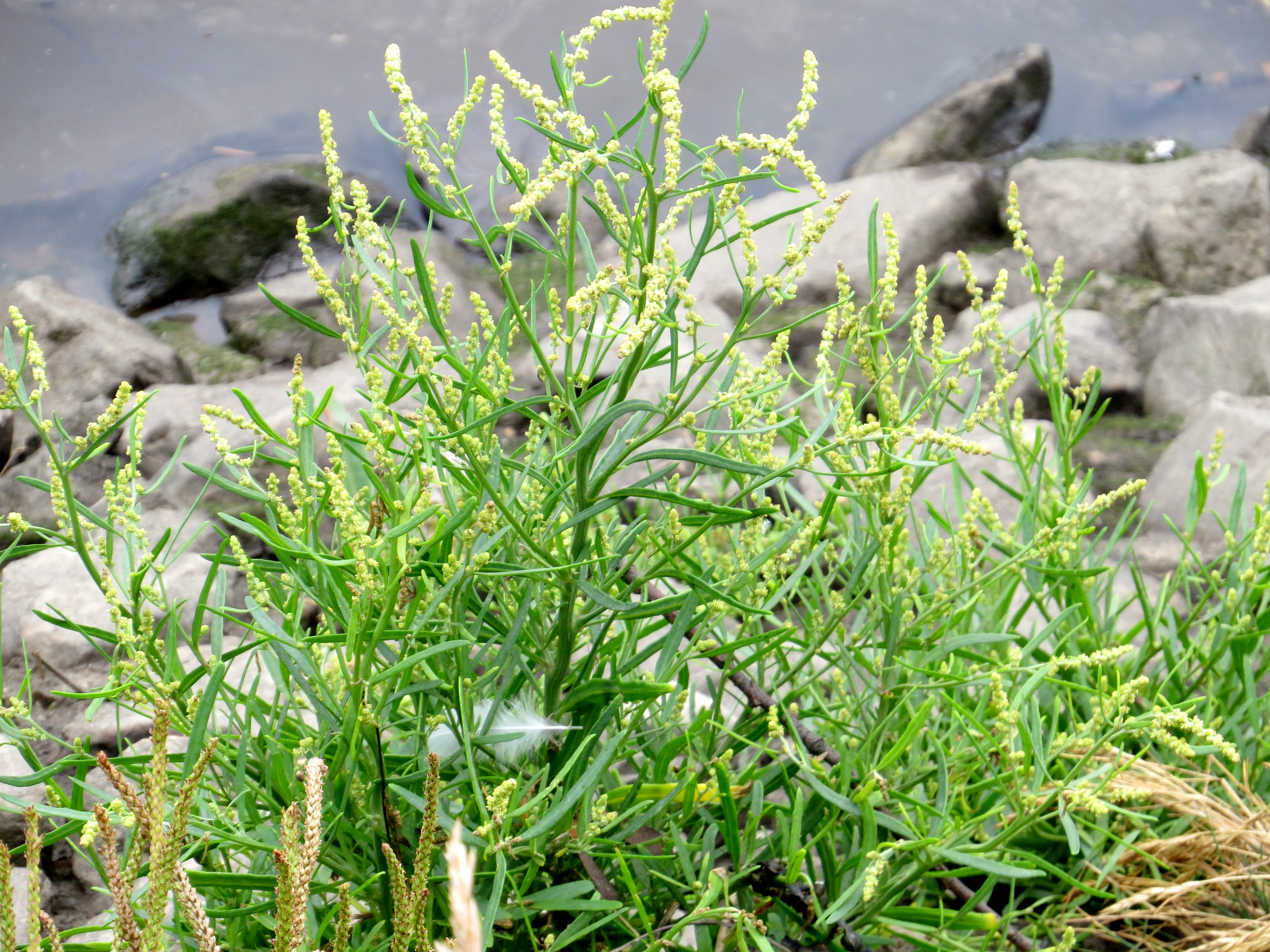
- Growing on the tidal banks of the River Tyne in Northumberland, England

Scientific classification
- Kingdom: Plantae
- Clade: Tracheophytes
- Clade: Angiosperms
- Clade: Eudicots
- Order: Caryophyllales
- Family: Amaranthaceae
- Genus: Atriplex
- Species: A. littoralis

Binomial name
- Atriplex littoralis L.

Synonyms
- Atriplex marina L.

= Atriplex littoralis =

Species of flowering plant

Atriplex littoralis, the grass-leaved orache (/ˈɒrətʃ/; also sometimes as "orach") is a species of plant in the family Amaranthaceae, subfamily Chenopodioideae. It is native to Europe, North Africa, and western and eastern Asia.

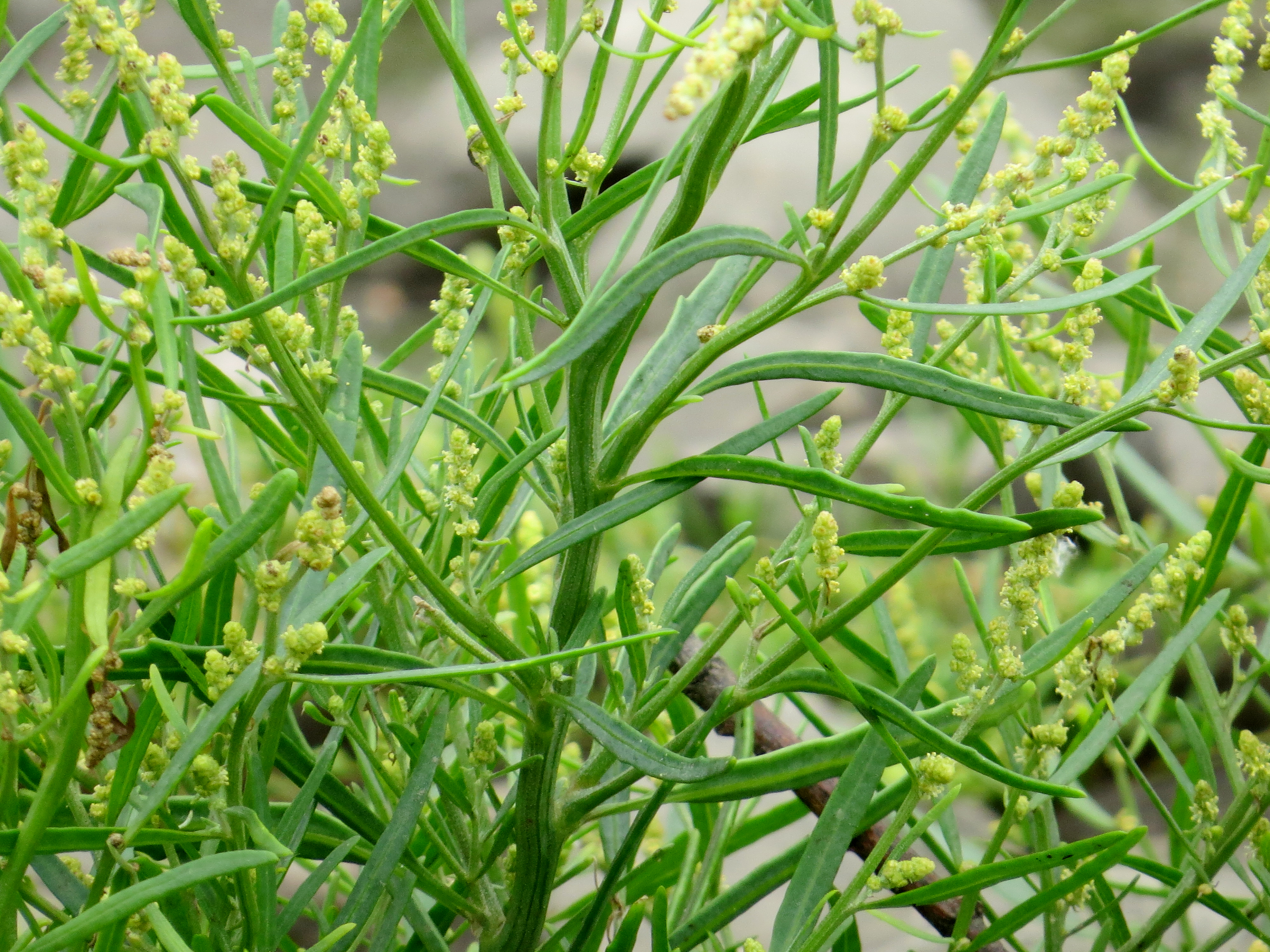
Close-up of leaves and flowers

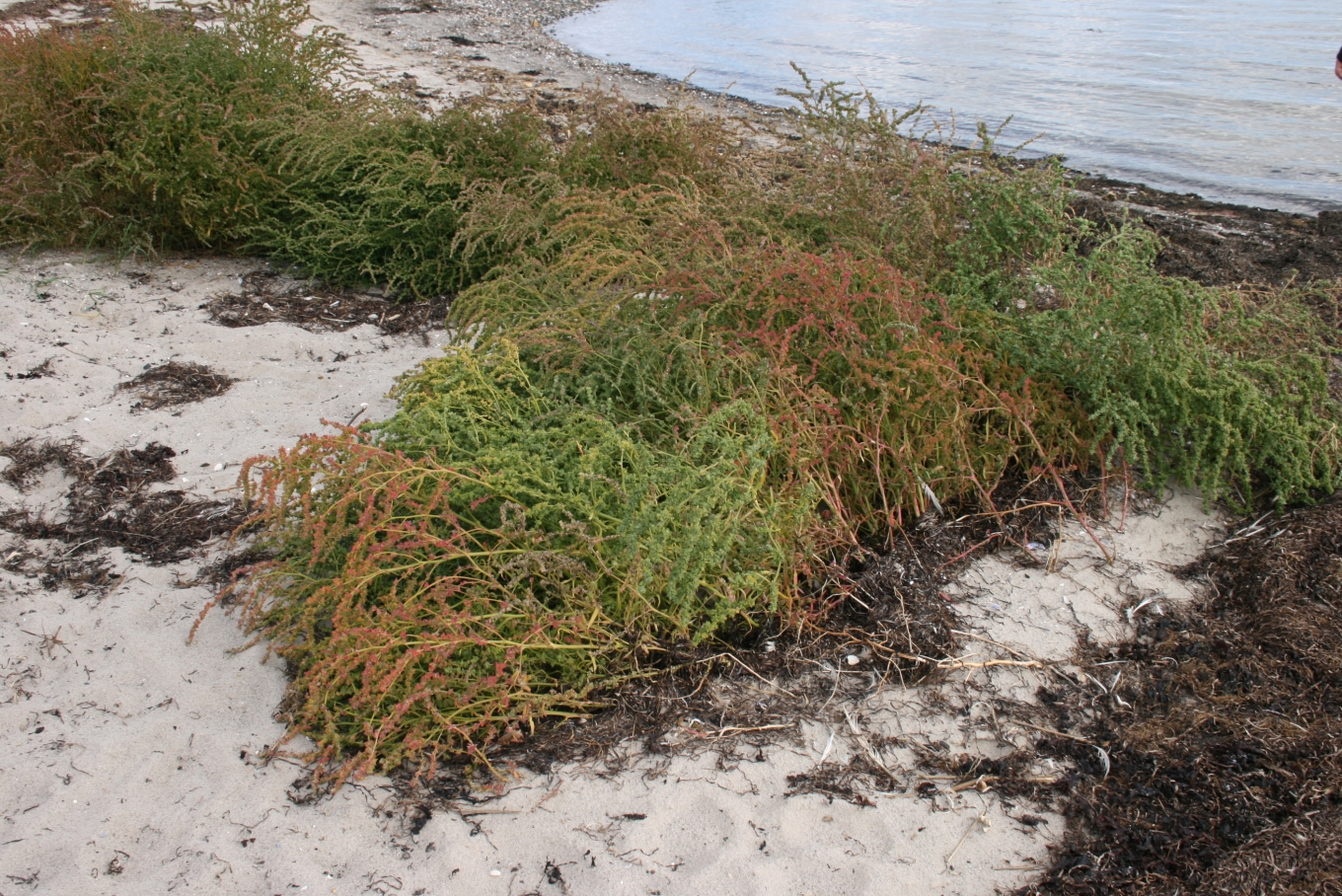
Habitat, on a beach in southeast Jylland, Denmark

== Description ==
It is a halophytic annual plant of shrubby appearance growing to 100 cm high, occurring along sandy, silty, or muddy beaches, saltmarshes, and tidal riverbanks, often in dense stands. All parts of the plant are sparsely hairy with short scurfy white hairs. It has ridged stems, green or red-tinged, and narrow bright green to grey-green leaves with entire or remotely-toothed margins. The flowers are in small clusters in spikes on the upper parts of the stems; they vary from yellow-green to reddish; in northern Europe it has flowers from July until August, occasionally to October.

In Great Britain, it is common and widespread, but scarcer in Ireland, where it is restricted to the east and south coasts and the Shannon Estuary; it is increasing in both countries. In recent decades (since the 1980s) it has taken advantage of road salt use on main roads in Britain to spread in and colonise new roadside areas well inland where it did not occur before.

It is naturalised locally in South Africa and the United States.

== Uses ==
The leaves are edible when cooked.
