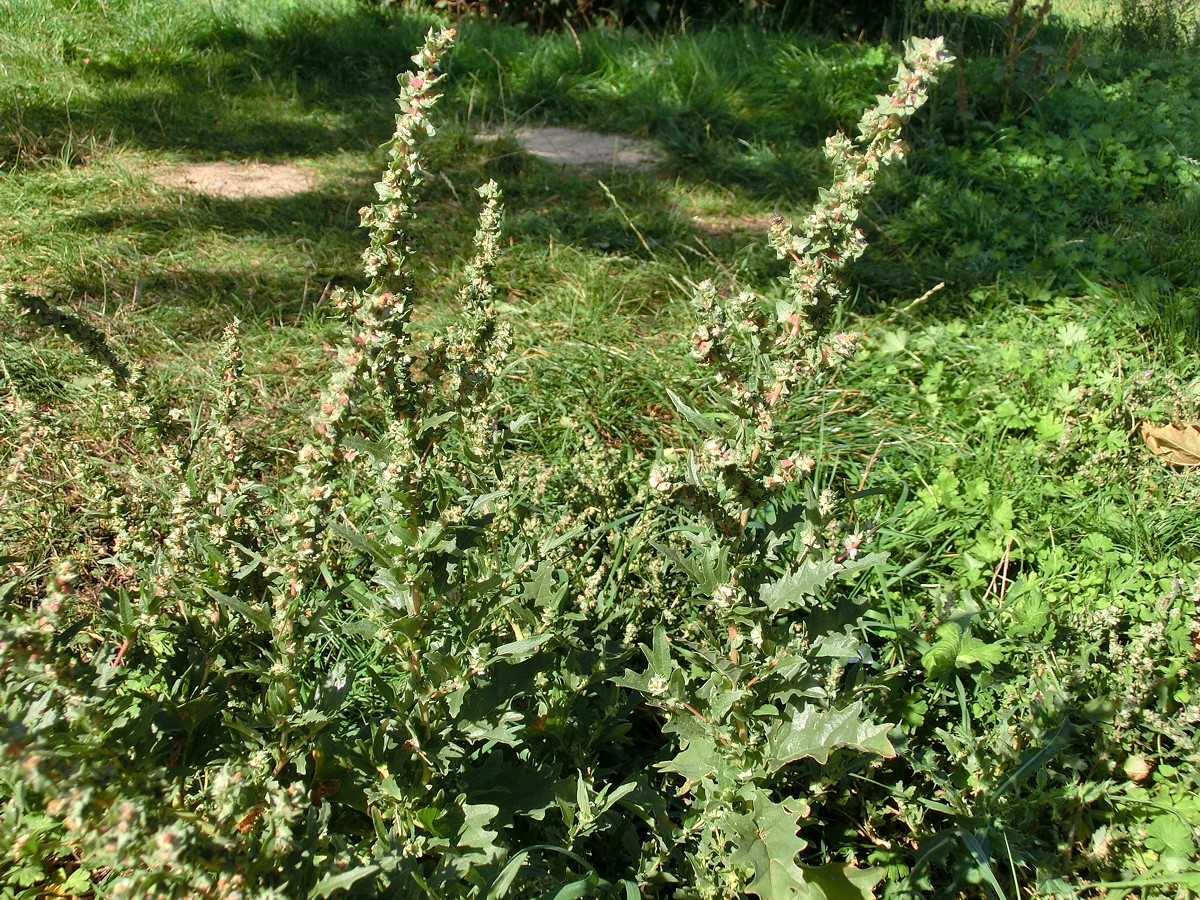

Scientific classification
- Kingdom: Plantae
- Clade: Tracheophytes
- Clade: Angiosperms
- Clade: Eudicots
- Order: Caryophyllales
- Family: Amaranthaceae
- Genus: Atriplex
- Species: A. tatarica

Binomial name
- Atriplex tatarica L.

= Atriplex tatarica =

Species of plant

Atriplex tatarica is a species of plant belonging to the family Amaranthaceae. Its native range spans a large area of Middle and western Central Asia, Asia Minor, North Africa, and Eastern Europe.

== Description ==
Atriplex tatarica is an annual plant that has a white branched taproot. The height of A. tatarica varies and can be anywhere from 10 centimeters (3.9 inches) to 1 meter (3.3 feet) in height. The pattern of leaf arrangement is alternate at all but the 2-4 lowermost nodes, which exhibit opposite leaf arrangement. Its leaves are petiolate, 2–5 centimeters (0.79–1.97 inches) long, 0.5–2 centimeters (0.20–0.79 inches) wide and are variously shaped. A. tatarica exhibits both female and male flora within a plant. Flowers are observed in clusters or solitary. As with other species in the genus Atriplex, A. tatarica is described to express heterocarpy as it produces two fruit types that vary in both size and color. Variation is also seen in chromosome number based on region. In Central Europe only diploid (2n = 18) plants have been observed, whereas in Russia both diploid (2n = 18) and tetraploid (2n = 36) plants have been found.

== Geographical distribution ==
A. tatarica has a widespread native distribution covering Middle Asia, Western Mongolia and Northwestern China as far north as Mongolian Altai. It spans Asia Minor as well as North Africa and South-East Europe. It has even spread to parts of the Eastern United States with A. tatarica being observed in Alabama, Connecticut, Florida, Massachusetts, New Jersey, Pennsylvania, and New Hampshire.

== Habitat ==
Inside its native distribution area of Middle and the western parts of Central Asia and Central Europe, A. tatarica is typically found in large populations in coastal solonchaks (areas with soil having high concentrations of soluble salts). It is reported as having strong tolerance to both nutrient and salinity gradients, and is also typically found in ruderal habitats. It is an early successional plant inhabiting urban areas, road margins, railways, dumps, and dung hills. The plant's propagation along roadways can be attributed to its bracteole covered seeds which readily adhere to rubber tires.
