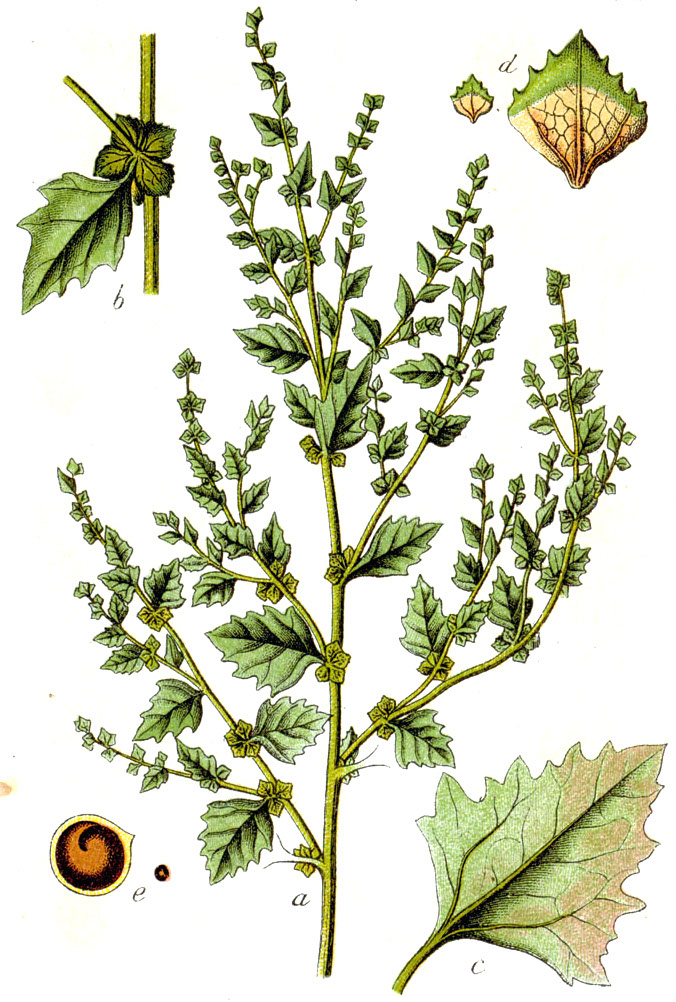

Scientific classification
- Kingdom: Plantae
- Clade: Tracheophytes
- Clade: Angiosperms
- Clade: Eudicots
- Order: Caryophyllales
- Family: Amaranthaceae
- Genus: Atriplex
- Species: A. rosea

Binomial name
- Atriplex rosea L.

= Atriplex rosea =

Species of flowering plant

Atriplex rosea is a species of saltbush known by the common names tumbling saltbush, red orach, redscale and tumbling orach (/ˈɒrətʃ/; also spelled orache). It is native to Eurasia but it is widespread elsewhere as an introduced species.

This is an annual herb with erect, hairless stems growing up to 1.5 meters, 4.5 feet, in height. The leaves are green to red in color, oval to triangular to lance-shaped, and with edges which are smooth to wavy. Each leaf has three prominent veins and is up to six centimeters long and three wide. The male and female flowers are borne in clusters or spikelike inflorescences.
