= David Nathaniel Friedrich Dietrich =

German botanist and gardener

David Nathaniel Friedrich Dietrich (3 October 1800 – 23 December 1888) was a German botanist and gardener.

Dietrich's birth year is listed as 1799 and 1800. He was born in Ziegenhain. In 1828 Dietrich worked as a botanical gardener in Jena. In 1836 he received his doctorate at the University of Jena, and later served as a curator at the botanical garden in Jena.

He was the nephew of the botanist Friedrich Gottlieb Dietrich (1765–1850).

Dietrich wrote pamphlets on poisonous plants, mosses, and forest flora and fauna of Germany as well as several botanical encyclopedias. His five-volume, 1839-1852 Synopsis Plantarum included about 80,000 species and 524 genera. The five-volume Flora of Germany published from 1833 to 1864 contains 1150 colored panels. The two-volume Forst Flora and the 476 booklets of the comprehensive Flora Universalis are his most famous work.

== Works ==
- Musci Thuringici, vivis exemplaribus exhibuerunt et illustraverunt, (1821–1825) exsiccata work (with Jonathan Carl Zenker, 1799–1837).
- Forst Flora, (two volumes 1828–1833)
- Flora Universalis, (476 booklets, 1828–1861)
- Flora Medica, (1831–1835)
- Lichenographia Germanica, (1832–1837)
- Deutschlands Flora, (5 volumes, 1833–1864)
- Synopsis Plantarum, (5 volumes, 1839–1852)
- Deutschlands ökonomische Flora, (1841–1844)
