= List of Atriplex species =

The following is a list of Atriplex species accepted by the Plants of the World Online as at June 2022:

- Atriplex abata I.M.Johnst.
- Atriplex acanthocarpa (Torr.) S.Watson
- Atriplex acutibractea R.H.Anderson
- Atriplex acutiloba R.H.Anderson
- Atriplex aellenii Sukhor.
- Atriplex alaschanica Y.Z.Zhao
- Atriplex alces Edginton & E.J.Thomps.
- Atriplex altaica Sukhor.
- Atriplex amboensis Schinz
- Atriplex ambrosioides (L.) Crantz
- Atriplex ameghinoi Speg.
- Atriplex amnicola Paul G.Wilson
- Atriplex angulata Benth.
- Atriplex arazdajanica Kopell
- Atriplex argentea Nutt.
- Atriplex argentina Speg.
- Atriplex asplundii Standl.
- Atriplex atacamensis Phil.
- Atriplex aucheri Moq.
- Atriplex australasica Moq.
- Atriplex barclayana (Benth.) D.Dietr.
- Atriplex belangeri (Moq.) Boiss.
- Atriplex billardierei (Moq.) Hook.f.
- Atriplex boecheri Aellen
- Atriplex braunii A.Soriano
- Atriplex brenanii Sukhor.
- Atriplex buchananii (Kirk) Kirk ex Cheeseman
- Atriplex bunburyana F.Muell.
- Atriplex cana Ledeb.
- Atriplex canescens (Pursh) Nutt.
- Atriplex centralasiatica Iljin
- Atriplex cephalantha Aellen
- Atriplex chapinii I.M.Johnst.
- Atriplex chenopodioides Batt.
- Atriplex chilensis Colla
- Atriplex chizae Rosas
- Atriplex cinerea Poir.
- Atriplex clivicola I.M.Johnst.
- Atriplex codonocarpa Paul G.Wilson
- Atriplex colerei Maire
- Atriplex confertifolia (Torr. & Frém.) S.Watson
- Atriplex congolensis Sukhor.
- Atriplex coquimbana Phil.
- Atriplex cordifolia J.M.Black
- Atriplex cordubensis Gand. & Stuck.
- Atriplex cordulata Jeps.
- Atriplex coriacea Forssk.
- Atriplex cornigera Domin
- Atriplex coronata S.Watson
- Atriplex corrugata S.Watson
- Atriplex costellata Phil.
- Atriplex coulteri (Moq.) D.Dietr.
- Atriplex crassifolia Ledeb.
- Atriplex crassipes J.M.Black
- Atriplex crenatifolia Chodat & Wilczek
- Atriplex crispa D.Dietr.
- Atriplex cristata Humb. & Bonpl. ex Willd.
- Atriplex cryptocarpa Aellen
- Atriplex cyclostegia Standl.
- Atriplex davisii Aellen
- Atriplex dimorphostegia Kar. & Kir.
- Atriplex dioica Raf.
- Atriplex drymarioides Standl.
- Atriplex eardleyae Aellen
- Atriplex eichleri Aellen
- Atriplex elachophylla F.Muell.
- Atriplex elegans (Moq.) D.Dietr.
- Atriplex eremitis Cranfield
- Atriplex erigavoensis Thulin
- Atriplex erosa A.E.Brueckner & I.Verd.
- Atriplex espostoi Speg.
- Atriplex exilifolia F.Muell.
- Atriplex eximia A.Soriano
- Atriplex farinosa Forssk.
- Atriplex fera (L.) Bunge
- Atriplex fissivalvis F.Muell.
- Atriplex flabelliformis Paul G.Wilson
- Atriplex flabellum Bunge ex Boiss.
- Atriplex flavida (S.C.Sand. & G.L.Chu) D.J.Keil & D.W.Taylor
- Atriplex fominii Iljin
- Atriplex frankenioides Moran
- Atriplex frigida Speg.
- Atriplex fruticulosa Jeps.
- Atriplex gardneri (Moq.) D.Dietr.
- Atriplex garrettii Rydb.
- Atriplex glabriuscula Edmondston
- Atriplex glauca L.
- Atriplex glaucescens Phil.
- Atriplex gmelinii C.A.Mey. ex Bong.
- Atriplex graciliflora M.E.Jones
- Atriplex griffithii Moq.
- Atriplex halimus L.
- Atriplex hollowayi de Lange & D.A.Norton
- Atriplex holocarpa F.Muell.
- Atriplex hortensis L.
- Atriplex humifusa Paul G.Wilson
- Atriplex humilis F.Muell.
- Atriplex hymenelytra (Torr.) S.Watson
- Atriplex hymenotheca Moq.
- Atriplex hypoleuca Nees
- Atriplex hystrix Phil.
- Atriplex iljinii Aellen
- Atriplex imbricata (Moq.) D.Dietr.
- Atriplex incrassata F.Muell.
- Atriplex infrequens Paul G.Wilson
- Atriplex intermedia R.H.Anderson
- Atriplex intracontinentalis Sukhor
- Atriplex isatidea Moq.
- Atriplex johnstonii C.B.Wolf
- Atriplex jubata S.Moore
- Atriplex julacea S.Watson
- Atriplex klebergorum M.C.Johnst.
- Atriplex kochiana Maiden
- Atriplex laciniata L.
- Atriplex laevis Ledeb.
- Atriplex lampa (Moq.) Gillies ex D.Dietr.
- Atriplex lanfrancoi (Brullo & Pavone) G.Kadereit & Sukhor.
- Atriplex lapponica Pojark.
- Atriplex lasiantha Boiss.
- Atriplex lentiformis (Torr.) S.Watson
- Atriplex leptocarpa F.Muell.
- Atriplex leuca Phil.
- Atriplex leucophylla (Moq.) D.Dietr.
- Atriplex limbata Benth.
- Atriplex lindleyi Moq.
- Atriplex linearis S.Watson
- Atriplex linifolia Humb. & Bonpl. ex Willd.
- Atriplex lithophila A.Soriano ex Múlgura
- Atriplex littoralis L.
- Atriplex lobativalvis F.Muell.
- Atriplex longipes Drejer
- Atriplex macropterocarpa (Aellen) H.Eichler
- Atriplex madariagae Phil.
- Atriplex malvana Aellen & Sauvage
- Atriplex matamorensis A.Nelson
- Atriplex maximowicziana Makino
- Atriplex mendozaensis Speg.
- Atriplex micrantha Ledeb.
- Atriplex mollis Desf.
- Atriplex moneta Bunge ex Boiss.
- Atriplex monilifera S.Watson
- Atriplex montevidensis Spreng.
- Atriplex morrisii R.H.Anderson
- Atriplex muelleri Benth.
- Atriplex muricata Humb. & Bonpl. ex Willd.
- Atriplex myriophylla Phil.
- Atriplex nana Parr-Sm.
- Atriplex nessorhina S.W.L.Jacobs
- Atriplex nilotica Sukhor.
- Atriplex nitrophiloides Múlgura
- Atriplex nogalensis Friis & M.G.Gilbert
- Atriplex nudicaulis Boguslaw
- Atriplex nummularia Lindl.
- Atriplex obconica Paul G.Wilson
- Atriplex oblongifolia Waldst. & Kit.
- Atriplex obovata Moq.
- Atriplex oestophora S.F.Blake
- Atriplex oreophila Phil.
- Atriplex ornata Iljin
- Atriplex pacifica A.Nelson
- Atriplex paludosa R.Br.
- Atriplex pamirica Iljin
- Atriplex pamparum Griseb.
- Atriplex papillata J.H.Willis
- Atriplex paradoxa Nikitina
- Atriplex parishii S.Watson
- Atriplex parryi S.Watson
- Atriplex patagonica (Moq.) D.Dietr.
- Atriplex patens (Litv.) Iljin
- Atriplex patula L.
- Atriplex pedunculata L.
- Atriplex perrieri Leandri
- Atriplex peruviana Moq.
- Atriplex philippica Weinm.
- Atriplex philippii R.E.Fr.
- Atriplex phyllostegia (Torr. ex S.Watson) S.Watson
- Atriplex plebeia Carmich.
- Atriplex polycarpa (Torr.) S.Watson
- Atriplex portulacoides L.
- Atriplex powellii S.Watson
- Atriplex pratovii Sukhor.
- Atriplex procumbens Less.
- Atriplex prosopidum I.M.Johnst.
- Atriplex prostrata Boucher ex DC.
- Atriplex pseudocampanulata Aellen
- Atriplex pueblensis Standl.
- Atriplex pumilio R.Br.
- Atriplex pungens Trautv.
- Atriplex pusilla (Torr. ex S.Watson) S.Watson
- Atriplex quadrivalvata Diels
- Atriplex quinii F.Muell.
- Atriplex quixadensis Del Vitto, Múlgura & Peten.
- Atriplex recurva d'Urv.
- Atriplex repanda Phil.
- Atriplex repens Roth
- Atriplex reptans I.M.Johnst.
- Atriplex retusa Gay
- Atriplex rhagodioides F.Muell.
- Atriplex robusta Stutz, M.R.Stutz & S.C.Sand.
- Atriplex rosea L.
- Atriplex rusbyi Britton
- Atriplex saccaria S.Watson
- Atriplex sagittata Borkh.
- Atriplex sagittifolia Speg.
- Atriplex schugnanica Iljin
- Atriplex semibaccata R.Br.
- Atriplex semilunaris Aellen
- Atriplex serenana A.Nelson ex Abrams
- Atriplex sibirica L.
- Atriplex sorianoi Múlgura
- Atriplex spegazzinii A.Soriano ex Múlgura
- Atriplex sphaeromorpha Iljin
- Atriplex spinibractea R.H.Anderson
- Atriplex spinifera J.F.Macbr.
- Atriplex spinulosa Paul G.Wilson
- Atriplex spongiosa F.Muell.
- Atriplex stipitata Benth.
- Atriplex stocksii (Wight) Boiss.
- Atriplex straminea Stutz & G.L.Chu
- Atriplex sturtii S.W.L.Jacobs
- Atriplex subcordata Kitag.
- Atriplex suberecta I.Verd.
- Atriplex sukhorukovii Başköse & Yaprak
- Atriplex taltalensis I.M.Johnst.
- Atriplex tampicensis Standl.
- Atriplex tatarica L.
- Atriplex tianschanica U.P.Pratov
- Atriplex tichomirovii Sukhor.
- Atriplex tornabenei Tineo ex Guss.
- Atriplex torreyi (S.Watson) S.Watson
- Atriplex truncata (Torr.) A.Gray
- Atriplex tularensis Coville
- Atriplex turbinata (R.H.Anderson) Aellen
- Atriplex turcica Başköse & Yaprak
- Atriplex turcomanica (Moq.) Boiss.
- Atriplex undulata (Moq.) D.Dietr.
- Atriplex valdesii Flores Olv.
- Atriplex vallenarensis M.Rosas
- Atriplex velutinella F.Muell.
- Atriplex verrucifera M.Bieb.
- Atriplex vesicaria Heward ex Benth.
- Atriplex vestita (Thunb.) Aellen
- Atriplex vulgatissima Speg.
- Atriplex watsonii A.Nelson ex Abrams
- Atriplex wolfii S.Watson
- Atriplex yeelirrie K.A.Sheph. & K.R.Thiele
- Atriplex zahlensis Mouterde
- Atriplex × aptera A.Nelson
- Atriplex × gustafssoniana Tascher.
- Atriplex × neomexicana Standl.
- Atriplex × northusanum Wein
- Atriplex × odontoptera Rydb.
- Atriplex × taschereaui Stace
