= Wedgescale =

Wedgescale is a common name for several plants and may refer to:

- Atriplex truncata, native to western North America
- Sphenopholis
