= Half Mile Lagoon =

- Location within Northland Region
- Location: Northland Region, North Island
- Coordinates: 34.7214°S 172.9970°E
- Type: dune lake
- Basin countries: New Zealand

Half Mile Lagoon is a (possibly former) lake in the Northland Region of New Zealand. It is located 5 km to the northwest of Ngataki, on the Aupouri Peninsula.

Half Mile Lagoon once covered an area of 36000 square metres, however the largest of the remaining pools was only approximately 100 square metres (when surveyed in 2005). This area is an example of decreasing water levels which have impacted on many of the smaller dune lakes on the Aupouri Peninsula.

Half Mile Lagoon lies directly adjacent to the Aupouri pine forest, and much of the catchment land use is pastoral.

== See also ==
- List of lakes in New Zealand
