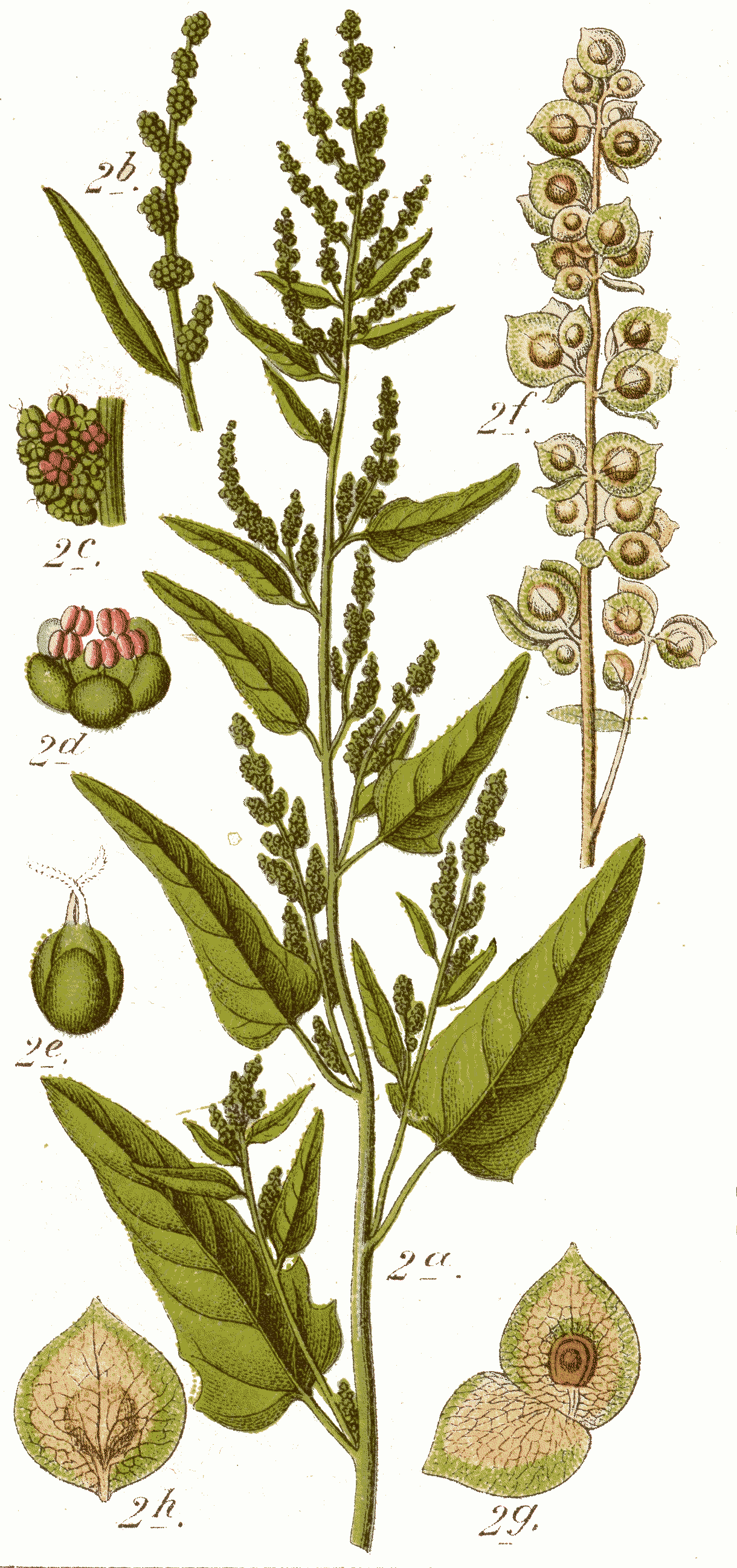
- 1796 painting of "Chenopodium hortense"

Scientific classification
- Kingdom: Plantae
- Clade: Tracheophytes
- Clade: Angiosperms
- Clade: Eudicots
- Order: Caryophyllales
- Family: Amaranthaceae
- Genus: Atriplex
- Species: A. hortensis

Binomial name
- Atriplex hortensis L.

Synonyms
- Synonymy: Atriplex acuminata M.Bieb.; Atriplex atrosanguinea Voss; Atriplex benghalensis Lam.; Atriplex heterantha Wight; Atriplex microtheca Moq.; Atriplex purpurea Voss; Atriplex ruberrima Moq.; Atriplex rubra (L.) Crantz; Atriplex spectabilis Ehrh. ex Moq.; Atriplex virgata Roth; Chenopodium benghalense Spielm. ex Steud.

= Atriplex hortensis =

Species of flowering plant

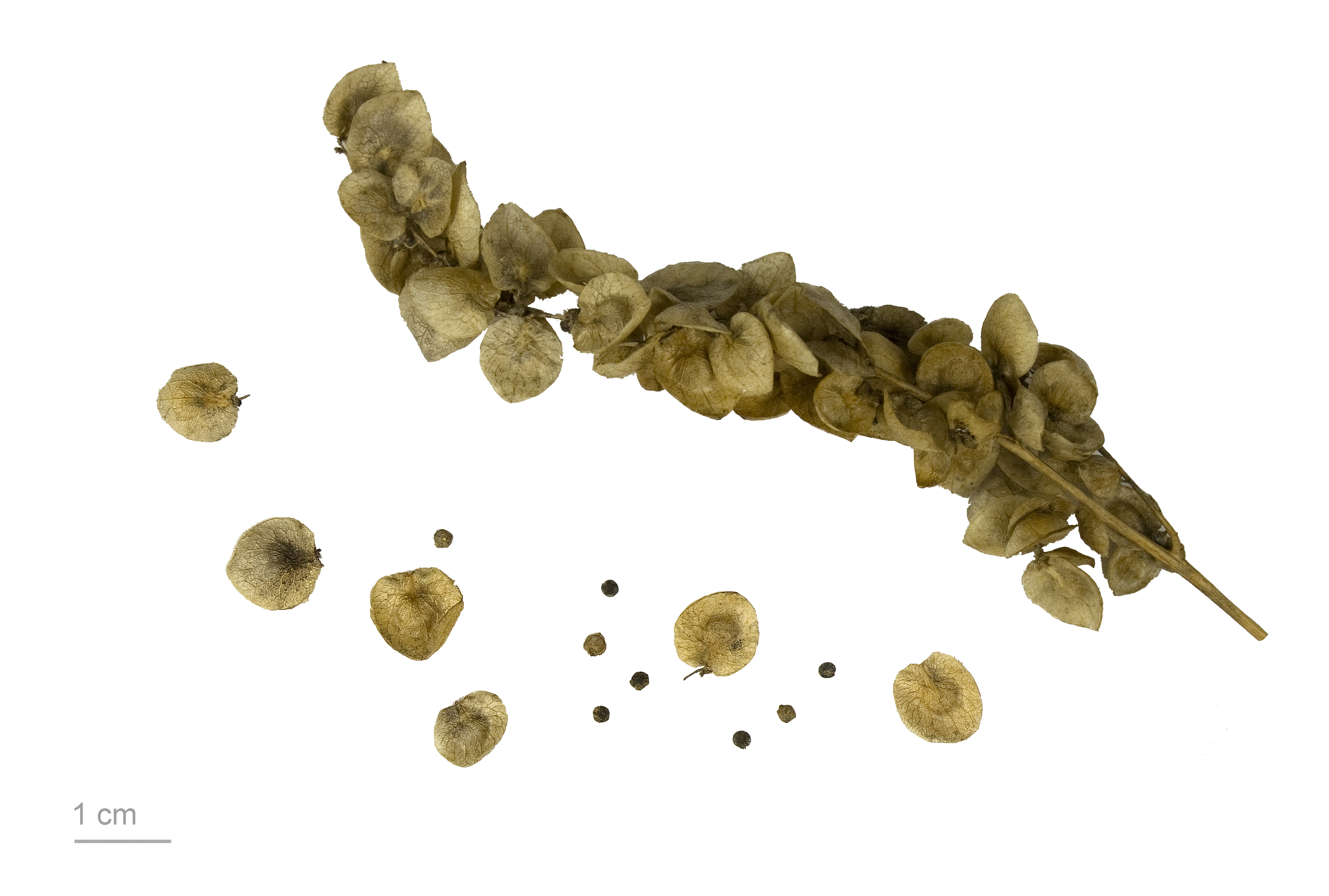
Atriplex hortensis fruit and seeds

Atriplex hortensis, known as garden orache, red orache or simply orache (/ˈɒrətʃ/; also spelled orach), mountain spinach, French spinach, or arrach, is a species of plant in the amaranth family used as a leaf vegetable that was common before spinach; it is still grown as a warm-weather alternative to spinach. For many years, it was classified in the goosefoot family (Chenopodiaceae), but it has now been absorbed into the Amaranthaceae. It is Eurasian, native to Asia and Europe, and widely naturalized in Canada, the United States, Australia, and New Zealand.

== Description ==
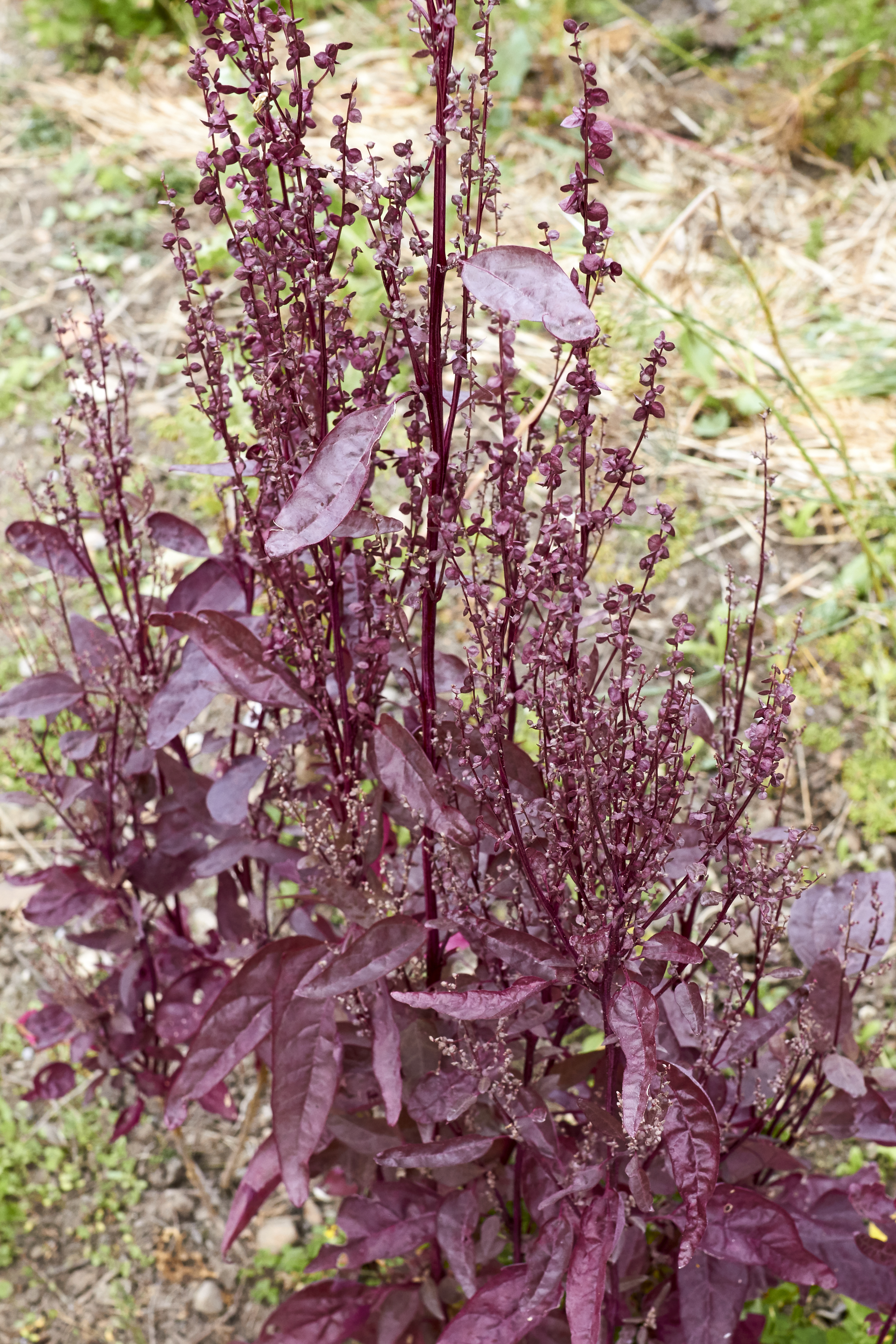
Red orache with unripe fruit

Atriplex hortensis is a hardy annual plant, with an erect, branching stem. It varies in height from two to six feet, according to the variety and soil. The leaves are variously shaped, but somewhat oblong, comparatively thin, and slightly acidic to the taste. There are varieties with red, white and green leaves. The flowers are small and obscure, greenish or reddish, corresponding to a degree with the color of the foliage of the plant. They can be male, female or hermaphrodite. The fruits are often overhanging because of their weight. The seeds retain their viability for three years. The yellow-brown seeds with a diameter of 3 to 4 millimeters and a more translucent seed shell are immediately germinable. The black seeds with a diameter of only 1.5 to 2 millimeters and smooth, thick, leathery seed shell germinate only after two years.

The pollination is carried out by self-pollination, wind pollination, or insects.

== Use and cultivation ==
Atriplex hortensis has a salty, spinach-like taste. The leaves are used cooked or raw in salads. The green leaves were once used to color pasta in Italy. A common use of the plant is to balance out the acidic flavor of sorrel.

It was commonly grown in Mediterranean regions from early times, until spinach became the more favored leaf vegetable. It is commonly grown as a warm-weather alternative to spinach because it is more tolerant of heat and slower to bolt in warm weather.

== Gallery ==
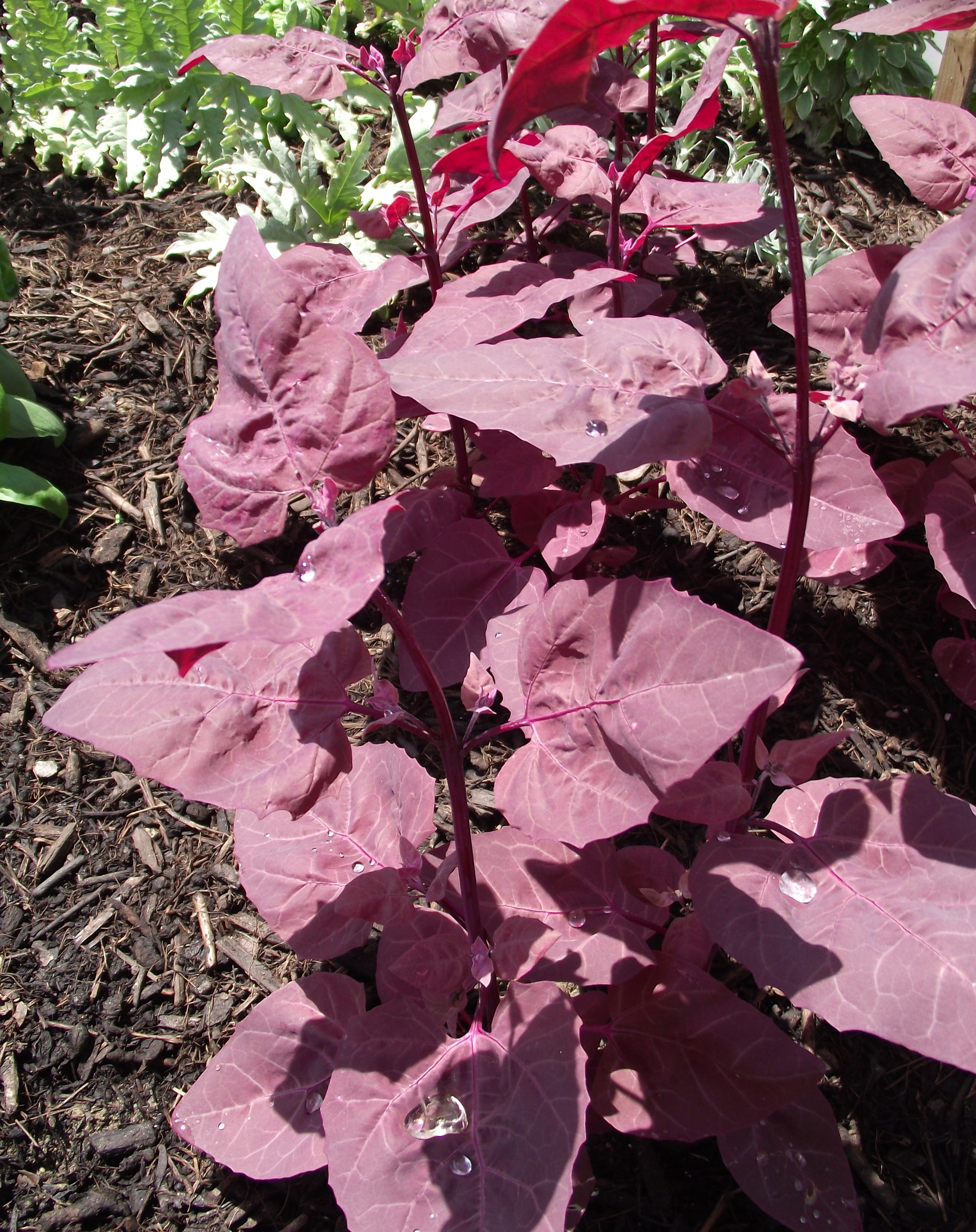
Atriplex hortensis var. rubra

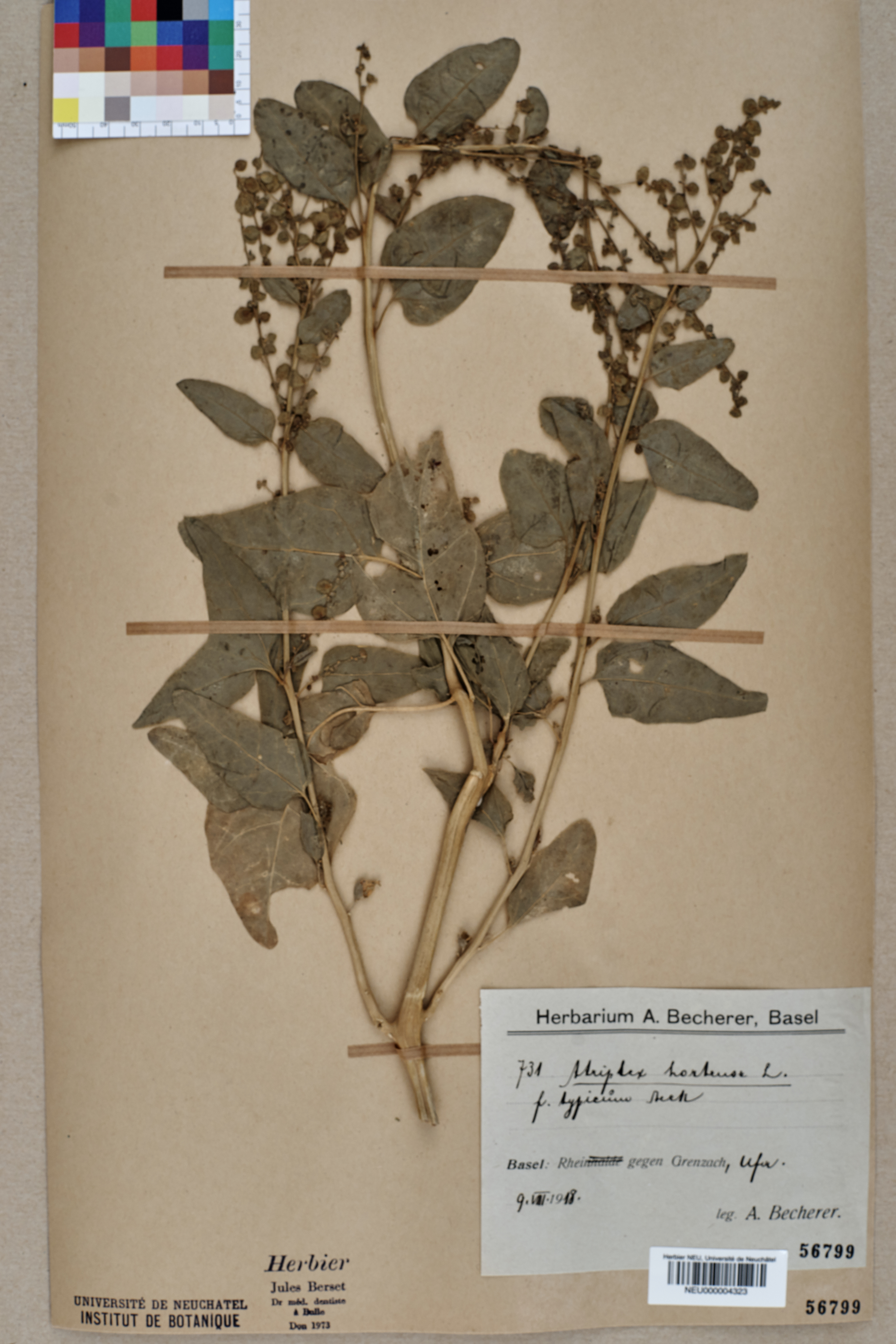
Dried, pressed specimen from the University of Neuchâtel

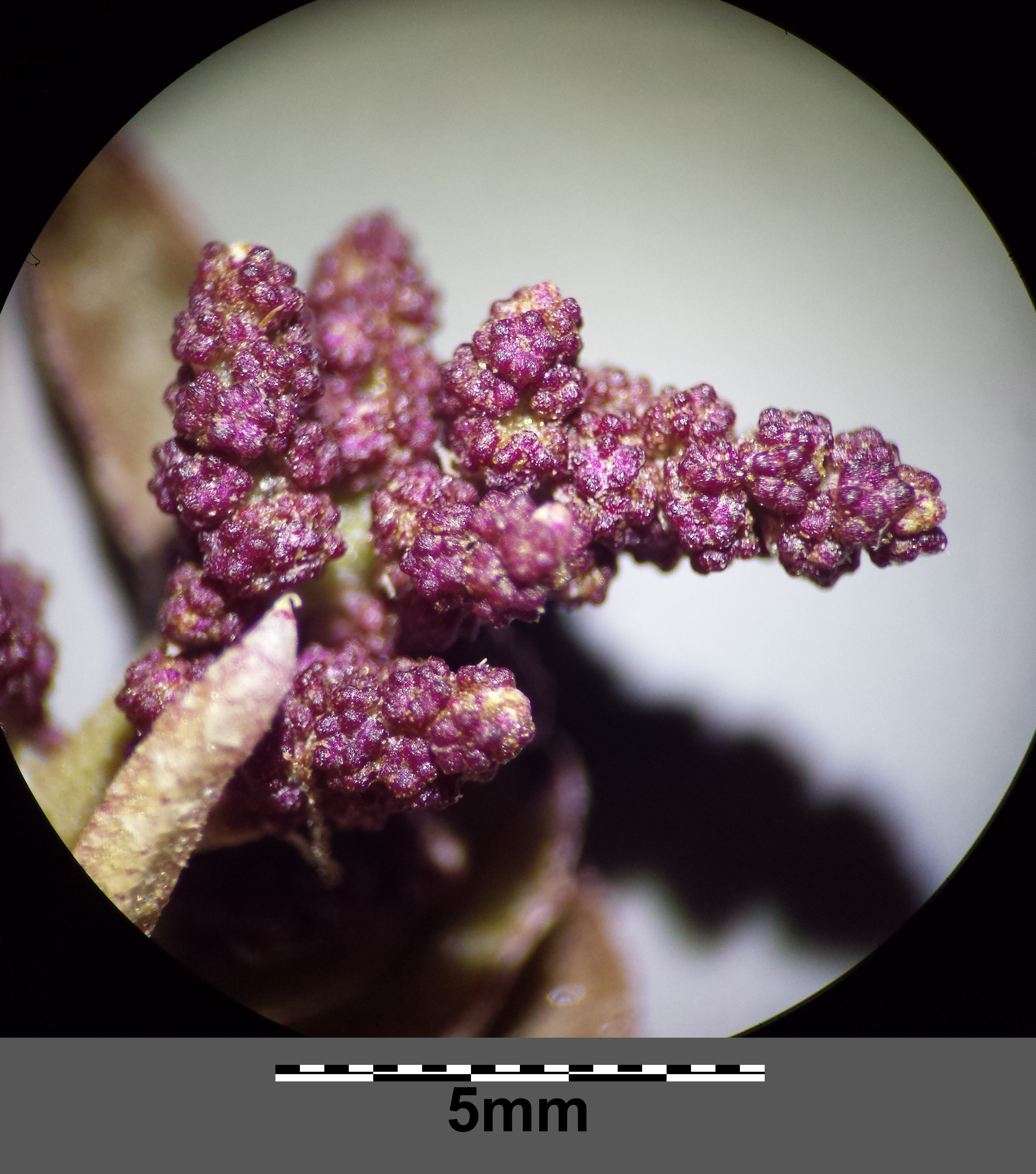
Inflorescence with predominantly male flowers
