= Atriplex sturtii =

Scientific classification
- Kingdom: Plantae
- Clade: Tracheophytes
- Clade: Angiosperms
- Clade: Eudicots
- Order: Caryophyllales
- Family: Amaranthaceae
- Genus: Atriplex
- Species: A. sturtii

Binomial name
- Atriplex sturtii S.W.L.Jacobs
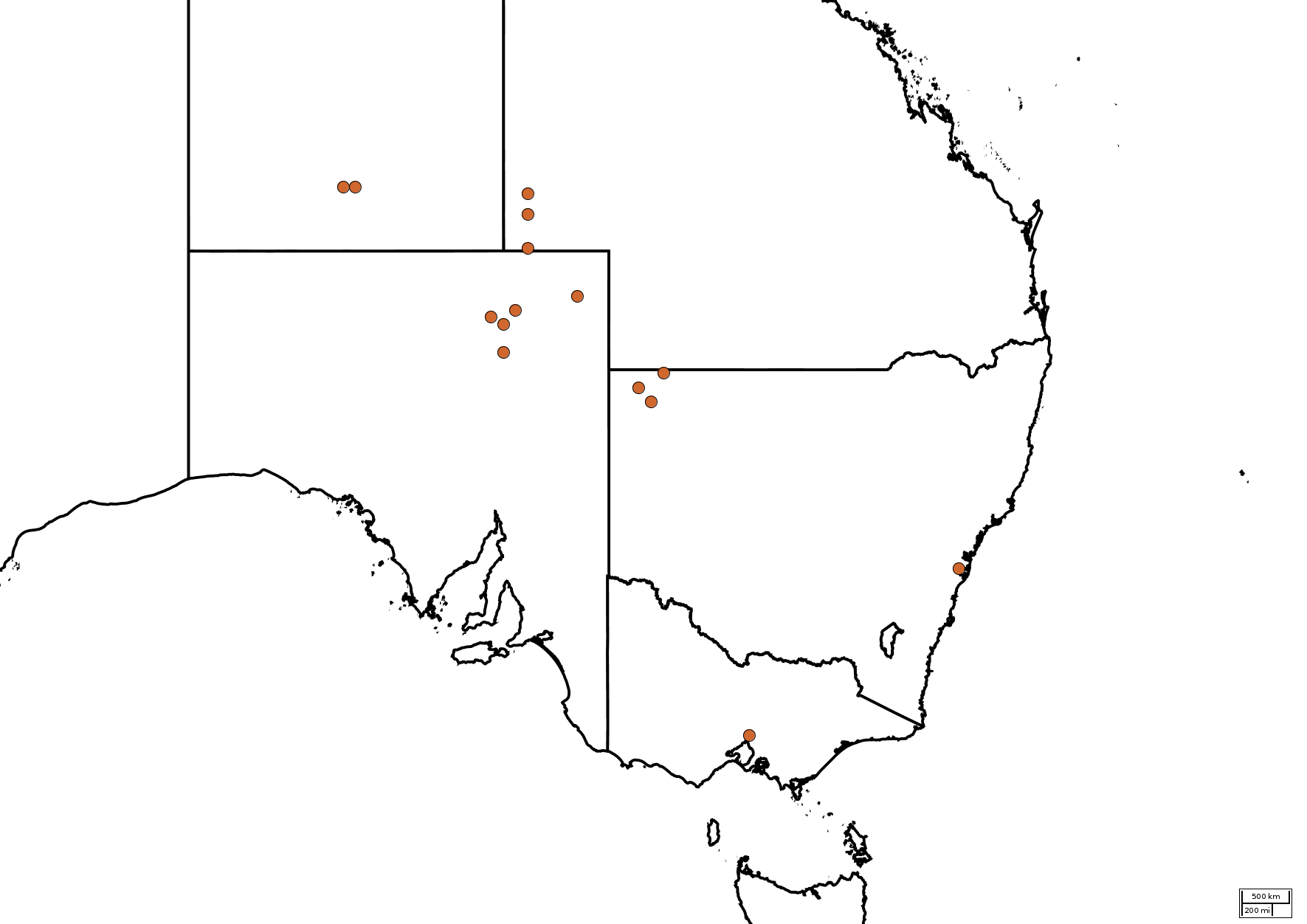
- Collections data for A. sturtii from the Australasian Virtual Herbarium

Synonyms
- Atriplex leptocarpa f. minor R.H.Anderson; Atriplex leptocarpa var. minor (R.H.Anderson) J.M.Black; Obione sturtii (S.W.L.Jacobs) G.L.Chu

Australian shrub

Atriplex sturtii, commonly known as saltbush, is an endangered species within the widespread genus Atriplex. A. sturtii is a native Australian shrub and grows in the Channel Country bioregion, also referred to as 'Corner Country'.

== Description ==
Atriplex sturtii is an annual or short-lived perennial shrub to 30 cm (12 in) high, with a monoecious reproductive system.

Branches slender, leaves thin and scaly, obovate to rhombic, growing to a length of 15 mm (0.59 in).

Flowering occurs from December to April, with male flowers located on the distal axis and female flowers growing abundantly in scattered clusters.

Fruiting bracteoles 2.4 mm (0.094 in) in length, lacking appendages. The lower portion is firm, cylindrical and straw-coloured, upper portion is thin-walled longitudinally and blends into a compressed green colour. Seeds obovate with hard exterior, radicle lateral and slightly protruded.

== Taxonomy ==
Atriplex sturtii is placed in the Amaranthaceae family. It is also a member of Caryophyllales, one of the largest orders of eudicots with approximately 12,500 species. Up to 70% of species in the Atriplex genera are considered endemic to Australia.

Atriplex sturtii closely resembles another species of saltbush, A. leptocarpa, correct identification involves critical observation of small differences in leaf shape and morphology.

The species is named after an early colonial explorer in the region, named Charles Sturt.

Taxonomic synonyms of A. sturtii include A. leptocarpa var. minor (R.H. Anderson), A. leptocarpa f. minor (R.H. Anderson and J.M. Black), and Obione sturtii (S.W.L Jacobs).

== Distribution and habitat ==
Atriplex sturtii occurs in arid zone ecosystems within the Channel Country bioregion, covering a geographic area of 28,885,384^{ha}. This bioregion spans across parts of the Northern Territory (NT), southwest Queensland, northeast South Australia and northwest New South Wales (NSW). The only known isolated population of the species in the Northern Territory occurs in the Rainbow Valley Claypan.

A. sturtii is known to be associated with the following vegetation communities:

- Arid shrublands (Acacia sub-formation)
- Sand Plain Mulga Shrublands
- Arid shrublands (Chenopod sub-formation)
- Freshwater wetlands
- Grasslands
- Saline wetlands
- Semi-arid woodlands (shrubby sub-formation)

== Ecology ==
Atriplex sturtii thrives in claypans and alluvial plains. Typically, associated species include Eragrostis australasica, Muehlenbeckia sp., and Atriplex lobativalvis.

The isolated Rainbow Valley Claypan population in the NT is neary to Tecticornis verrucosa, Eragrostis dielsii and Frankenia sp. The species has also been recorded growing in a clay loam riverbank in South Australia with Muehlenbeckia sp., Senecio lanibracteus and Atriplex crassipes. A. sturtii has been documented growing on top of a wombat burrow in open chenopod plain, with larger shrubs surrounding such as Acacia oswaldii.

Individuals of A. sturtii in extremely arid environments could be seasonally dependent on rainfall events.

The fleshy leaves are a staple food source for many herbivorous fauna species, particularly macropods, as well as a diversity of insects.

== Uses ==
Channel Country is located on the traditional lands of at least 25 diverse Indigenous nations, including the Malyangaba, Kullilla and Dhirari peoples.

Atriplex sturtii, as well as many other saltbushes within the genus Atriplex, have been used as a food source by Aboriginal and Torres Strait Islander communities for thousands of generations. The seeds of the plant were collected, roasted over a fire and ground into a powdered form. This was, and continues to be, used for a range of culinary purposes, such as seasoning wild meats or making damper bread. Medicinally, leaves of the plant were often added to water as a skin cleanser for burns or wounds.

From a colonial perspective, many species of saltbush were used as fodder by grazing sheep and cattle due to palatability. In 1871, a map of Western New South Wales was produced by A. Bruce which labelled the region as 'Saltbush Country'.

== Conservation actions ==
Atriplex sturtii is considered an endangered species in NSW and is part of the Saving our Species (SoS) program, under the Data-deficient species management stream. The lack of empirical knowledge about A. sturtii has resulted in the proposal of a range of conservation actions. As outlined in the SoS strategy, this includes:

Investigate life history dynamics; including seed set, seed viability, germination and seedling survival.

Undertake targeted surveys across entire predicted range to locate new populations and re-confirm status of known populations. Collect data on area of occupancy, population status, habitat and undertake threat assessment. Survey only after above-average spring rainfall.

Conduct experimental research into the relative impacts of grazing and fire on the species survival and recruitment.

Collect seed from several populations to cover genetic diversity and store seed at Royal Botanic Gardens SeedBank.

— NSW Government, SoS - Strategy Summary

== Gallery ==
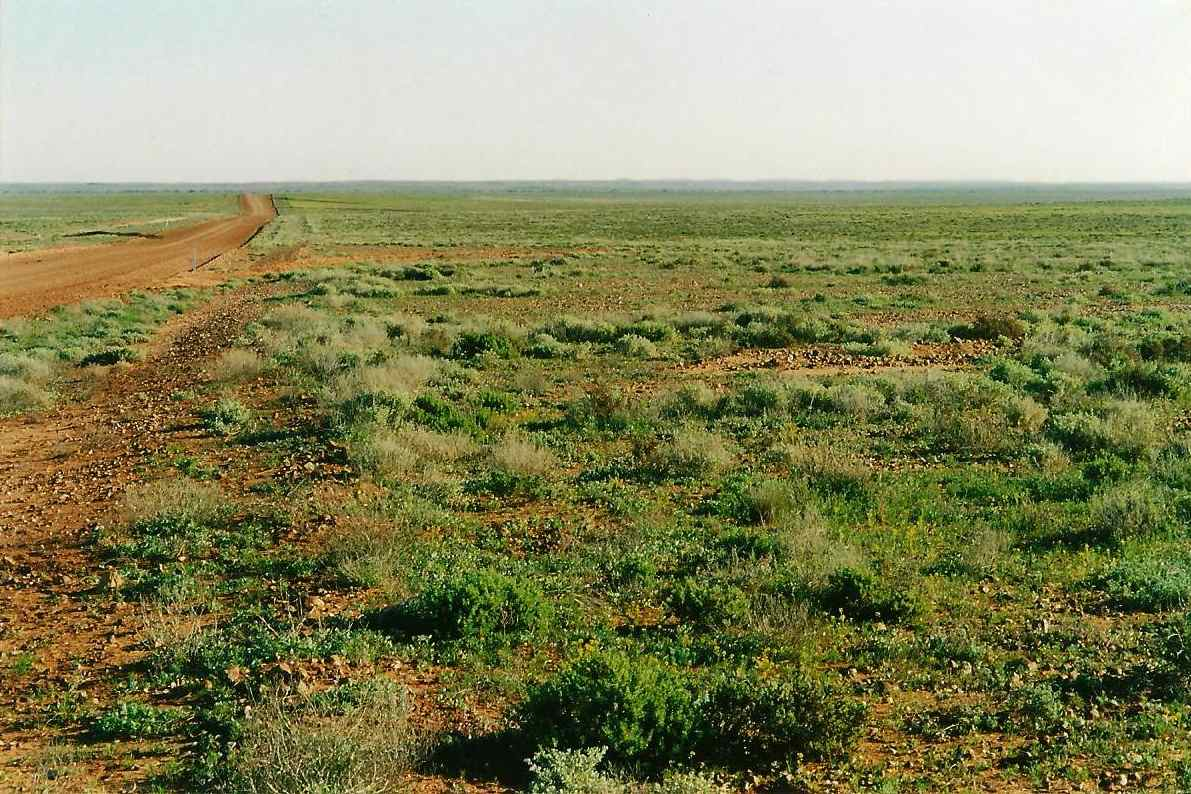
Southeastern corner of the Channel Country bioregion, Sturt National Park, NSW Australia
