= Spirits Bay =

Bay in Northland, New Zealand

Coordinates: 34.44°S 172.82°E

Spirits Bay Piwhane (Māori)
- bay
- Interactive map of Spirits Bay
- Location: Northland Region, New Zealand
- Water bodies: Tasman Sea

Spirits Bay, officially named Piwhane / Spirits Bay, is a remote bay at the northern end of the Aupōuri Peninsula, which forms the northern tip of New Zealand's North Island. It lies between Cape Reinga / Te Rerenga Wairua in the west and Ngataea / Hooper Point in the east. It is one of two bays in the short length of coast at the top of the North Island (the other being Takapaukura / Tom Bowling Bay, further to the east).

Kapowairua, a locality at the eastern end of Spirits Bay, has a campsite managed by the Department of Conservation. A walking path of about 8.5 kilometres (5.3 miles) runs along the bay.

== History and culture ==
The Māori tribe of the area is Ngāti Kurī.

The bay was given the official name of Piwhane / Spirits Bay in 2015.

The bay is considered a sacred place in Māori culture as according to local legend, it is the location where spirits of the dead gather to depart from this world to travel to their ancestral home (or afterlife) from a large old pōhutukawa tree above the bay.

The bay has two Māori names, Piwhane and Kapowairua, the latter meaning to "catch the spirit", derived from a Māori language saying that translates into English as: "I can shelter from the wind. But I cannot shelter from the longing for my daughter. I shall venture as far as Hokianga, and beyond. Your task (should I die) shall be to grasp my spirit." The words were spoken by Tōhē, a chief of the Ngāti Kahu people, who is considered one of Muriwhenua’s most important ancestors. Tōhē made his way south, naming more than one hundred places along the western coast, until dying at Whāngaiariki near Maunganui Bluff.

== Nature and wildlife ==
A variety of birds inhabit the bay area such as paradise ducks, New Zealand dotterel, oystercatchers, and Caspian terns. Mosquitos are very numerous. Plant life at the beach includes paraha vine.

In September 2010, it was reported that more than eighty pilot whales were beached over five kilometres at Spirits Bay. About forty of these were believed to have died, including some that drowned and others that were euthanized because of injuries from rocks. The rest of the whales were relocated to Rarawa Beach because the weather and sea conditions at Spirits Bay meant refloating the whales there was not possible. Most of the pilot whales that were refloated at Rarawa Beach survived. It was considered to be the largest whale transport ever attempted. This mass whale stranding occurred a month after a pod of fifty-eight pilot whales became stranded at Karikari Beach.

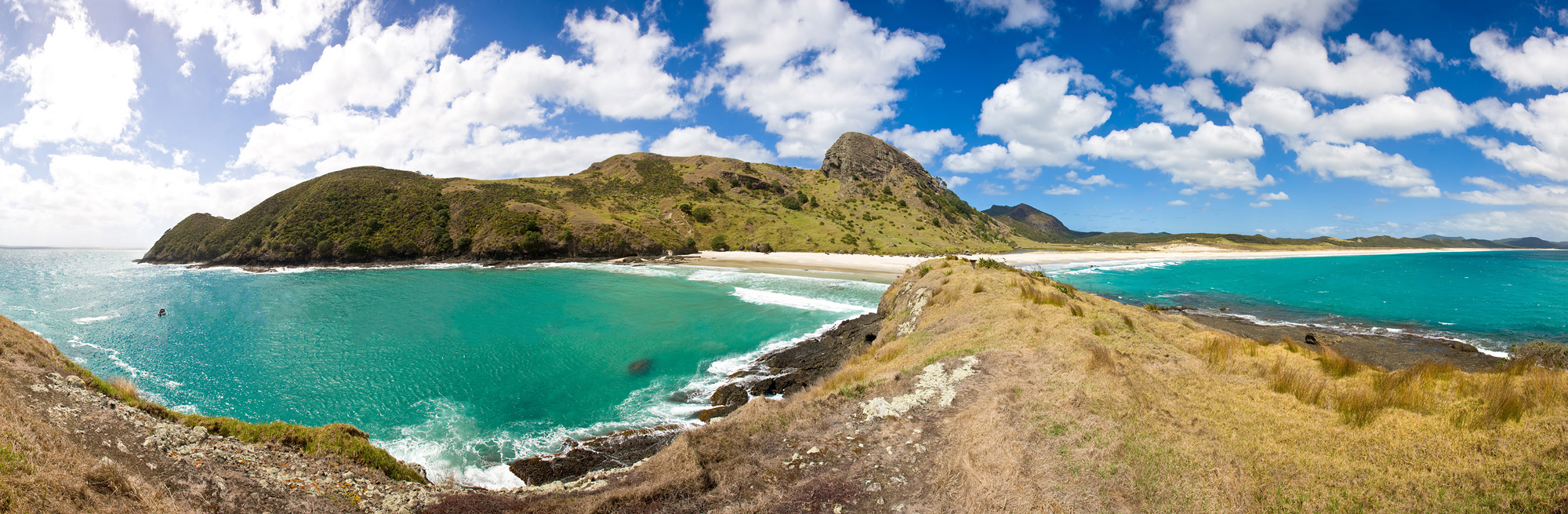
View from Pananehe Island at the eastern end of Spirits Bay, with Te Karaka Bay (left) and Ngataea / Hooper Point (far left) and the long beach of Spirits Bay stretching to the right
