= Ngataki =

- Interactive map of Ngataki
- Coordinates: 34°44′30″S 173°2′48″E
- Country: New Zealand
- Region: Northland Region
- District: Far North District
- Ward: Te Hiku
- Community: Te Hiku
- Subdivision: North Cape
- Electorates: Northland; Te Tai Tokerau

Government
  - Territorial Authority: Far North District Council
  - Regional council: Northland Regional Council
  - Mayor of Far North: Moko Tepania
  - Northland MP: Grant McCallum
  - Te Tai Tokerau MP: Mariameno Kapa-Kingi

Ngataki is a community on the Aupouri Peninsula in Northland, New Zealand. State Highway 1 runs through the area. To the north-east is Rarawa Beach, a mile-long strip of clean silver sand, gently shelving and backed by sand dunes. North of that is Great Exhibition Bay and to the south-west is the long Ninety Mile Beach coastline.

== Demographics ==
Ngataki is in two SA1 statistical areas which cover 219.98 km^{2} (84.93 sq mi) and include Rarawa Beach and the peninsula on the east side of Houhora Harbour and part of Ninety Mile Beach on the west side of Aupouri Peninsula. The SA1 area is part of the larger North Cape statistical area.

Historical population
| Year | Pop. | ±% p.a. |
|---|---|---|
| 2013 | 195 | — |
| 2018 | 243 | +4.50% |
| 2023 | 249 | +0.49% |

The SA1 areas had a population of 249 in the 2023 New Zealand census, an increase of 6 people (2.5%) since the 2018 census, and an increase of 54 people (27.7%) since the 2013 census. There were 138 males, and 117 females in 102 dwellings. 2.4% of people identified as LGBTIQ+. There were 39 people (15.7%) aged under 15 years, 33 (13.3%) aged 15 to 29, 120 (48.2%) aged 30 to 64, and 51 (20.5%) aged 65 or older.

People could identify as more than one ethnicity. The results were 56.6% European (Pākehā), 66.3% Māori, 4.8% Pasifika, and 4.8% other, which includes people giving their ethnicity as "New Zealander". English was spoken by 98.8%, Māori language by 21.7%, Samoan by 1.2% and other languages by 4.8%. The percentage of people born overseas was 7.2, compared with 28.8% nationally.

Religious affiliations were 28.9% Christian, and 18.1% Māori religious beliefs. People who answered that they had no religion were 43.4%, and 13.3% of people did not answer the census question.

Of those at least 15 years old, 24 (11.4%) people had a bachelor's or higher degree, 135 (64.3%) had a post-high school certificate or diploma, and 48 (22.9%) people exclusively held high school qualifications. 6 people (2.9%) earned over $100,000 compared to 12.1% nationally. The employment status of those at least 15 was that 99 (47.1%) people were employed full-time, 33 (15.7%) were part-time, and 12 (5.7%) were unemployed.

== Attractions ==
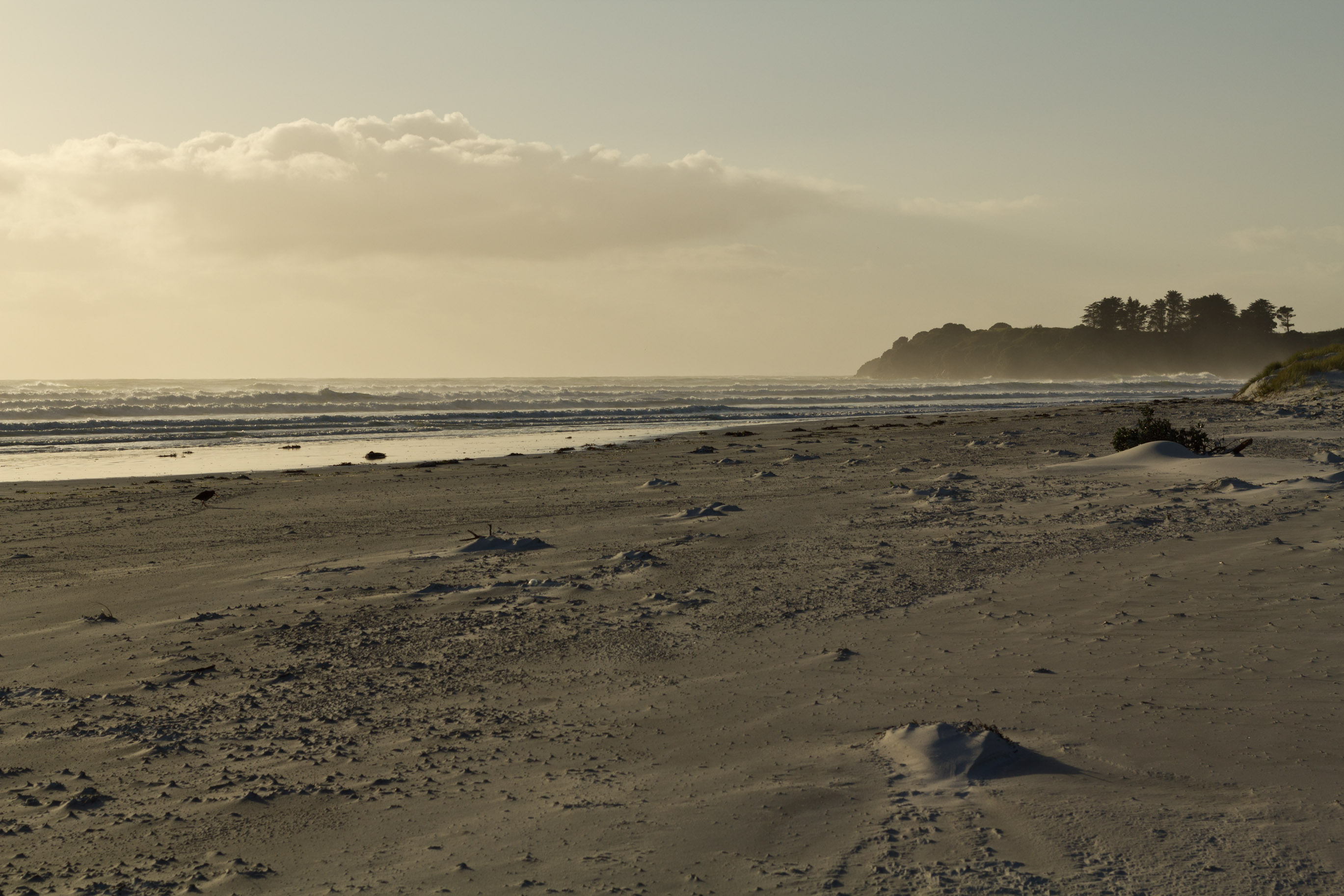
Rarawa Beach on an autumn morning

Ngataki is near Rarawa Beach on the eastern coast. In December 2008, Ngataki School students planted 120 rare Holloway's crystalwort (Atriplex hollowayi) plants, small native herbs that grow near high tide level on sandy beaches. The school and the New Zealand Department of Conservation worked together to help restore the beach, a home to dotterels and oystercatchers, because the ecosystem was under threat as a result of natural and man-made causes.

Twenty-four pilot whales that stranded at Spirits Bay in September 2010 were trucked to Rarawa Beach, with fourteen surviving and swimming strongly out to sea. The trucking of the whales to Rarawa Beach was thought to be the largest whale transport ever attempted.

In 2011, day four of the National Scholastic Surfing Championship was held at Rarawa Beach.

== Marae ==
The local Waiora Marae and meeting house are a traditional meeting place for Ngāti Kurī.

== Education ==
Ngataki School is a coeducational full primary (years 1–8) school with a roll of 59 students as of March 2026. The school was founded about 1911.
