= Atriplex codonocarpa =

Scientific classification
- Kingdom: Plantae
- Clade: Tracheophytes
- Clade: Angiosperms
- Clade: Eudicots
- Order: Caryophyllales
- Family: Amaranthaceae
- Genus: Atriplex
- Species: A. codonocarpa

Binomial name
- Atriplex codonocarpa Paul G.Wilson

Synonyms
- Atriplex halimoides var. deplanata F.Muell.; Obione codonocarpa (Paul G.Wilson) G.L.Chu

Species of plant in the amaranth family

Atriplex codonocarpa, the flat-topped saltbush, is a species of flowering plant in the family Amaranthaceae, native to Western Australia. It is often found growing on the outer edges of salt lakes.
