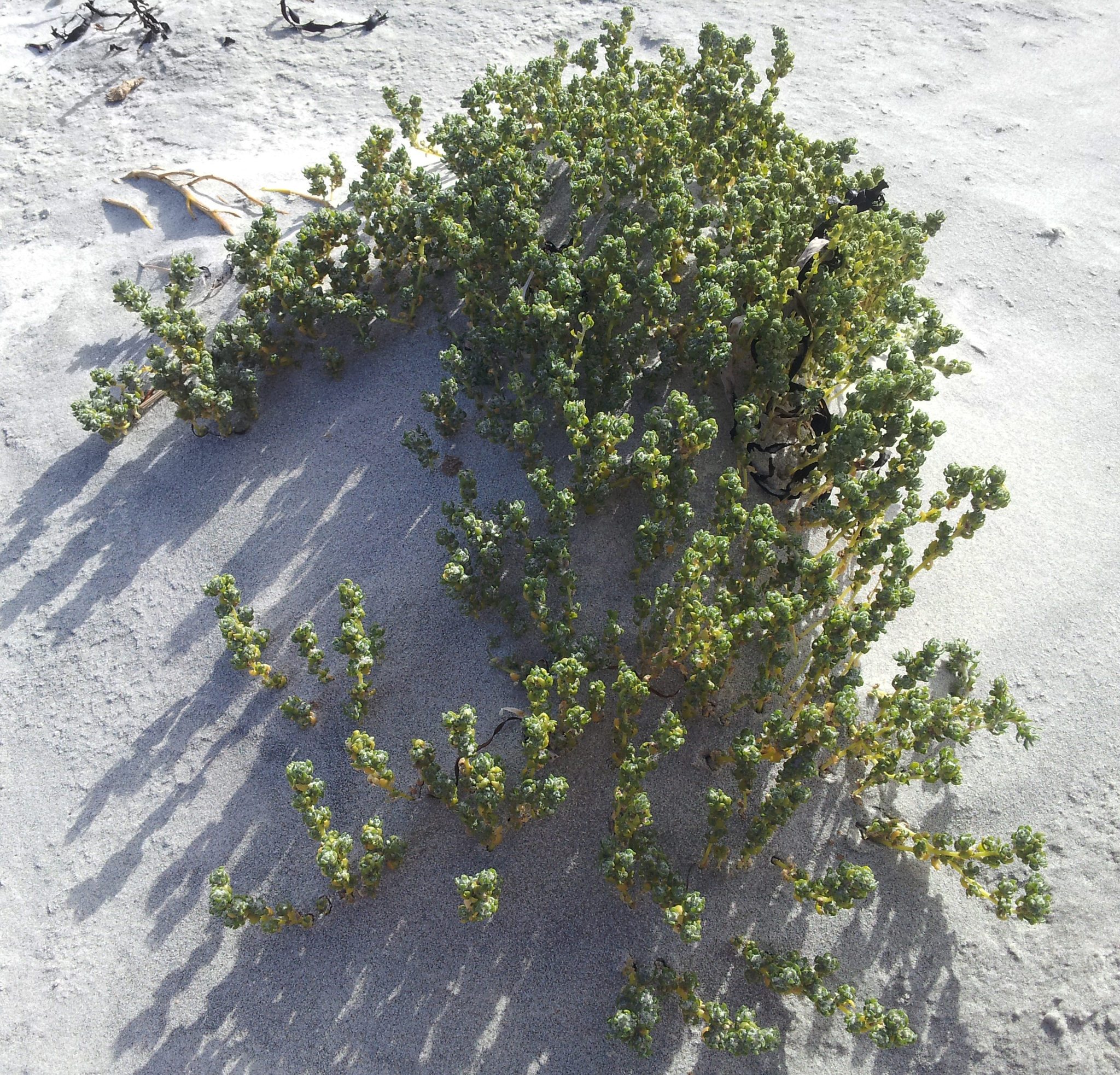

Conservation status
- Nationally Critical (NZ TCS)

Scientific classification
- Kingdom: Plantae
- Clade: Tracheophytes
- Clade: Angiosperms
- Clade: Eudicots
- Order: Caryophyllales
- Family: Amaranthaceae
- Genus: Atriplex
- Species: A. hollowayi

Binomial name
- Atriplex hollowayi de Lange & D.A.Norton

= Atriplex hollowayi =

Species of plant

Atriplex hollowayi, also known as Holloway's crystalwort, is a species of annual herbaceous plant in the genus Atriplex. This species is endemic to New Zealand. It has the "Nationally Critical" conservation status under the New Zealand Threat Classification System.

== Description ==
Atriplex hollowayi is a soft, succulent annual plant. The stem and leaves look like they are coated with sugar crystals. The plant is a many-branch shrub that grows in sand to a diameter of 80–120 cm (31–47 in), the yellow branches themselves 1–5 cm (0.4–2.0 in) long. The smooth, roughly oval leaves are 2–12 mm (0.08–0.47 in) long by 1–6 mm (0.04–0.24 in) wide with irregular dentate (toothed) margins.

== Taxonomy ==
Atriplex hollowayi was described in 2000 by New Zealand botanists Peter de Lange and David Norton, who distinguished it from the widespread Atriplex billardierei. On reviewing the herbarium specimens of the latter species, de Lange noted there were two distinct forms: one with larger leaves with entire margins, and larger bracteoles and seeds, and one with smaller leaves with irregular sinuate-dentate margins and smaller bracteoles and seeds. This latter form was restricted to the North Island, and following field work was described as a new species, its name honouring botanist and conservationist John Stevenson Holloway, who had died in 1999.

== Distribution ==
It inhabits the strand line, the unvegetated stable sand above the high tide line. It was once found on beaches from the Northland Region to Wellington. Now it is only found on one beach, with a population estimated at fewer than 50 plants. The reason for its decline is unknown.
