= Atriplex nessorhina =

Scientific classification
- Kingdom: Plantae
- Clade: Embryophytes
- Clade: Tracheophytes
- Clade: Spermatophytes
- Clade: Angiosperms
- Clade: Eudicots
- Order: Caryophyllales
- Family: Amaranthaceae
- Genus: Atriplex
- Species: A. nessorhina

Binomial name
- Atriplex nessorhina S.W.L.Jacobs

Synonyms
- Obione nessorhina (S.W.L.Jacobs) S.C.Sand. & G.L.Chu

Species of plant in the amaranth family

Atriplex nessorhina, the Donald Duck saltbush, is a species of flowering plant in the family Amaranthaceae, native to Australia, where it is found in central South Australia, New South Wales, and southwest Queensland. Its bracteoles have swollen bases and beak-like valves.
