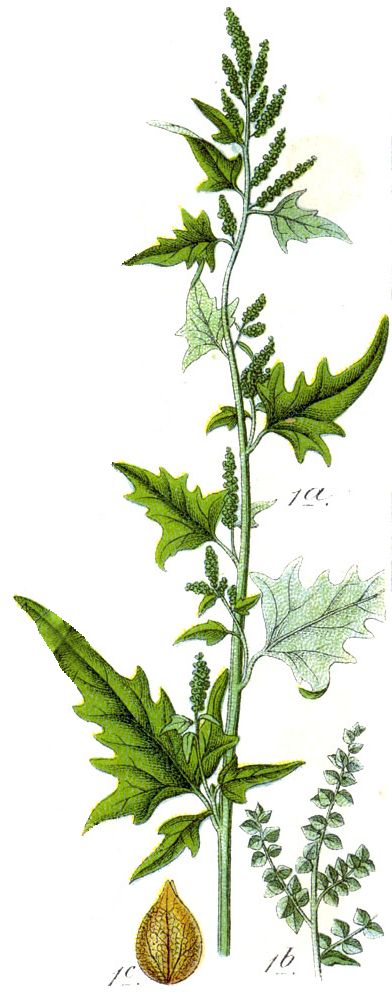

Scientific classification
- Kingdom: Plantae
- Clade: Tracheophytes
- Clade: Angiosperms
- Clade: Eudicots
- Order: Caryophyllales
- Family: Amaranthaceae
- Genus: Atriplex
- Species: A. sagittata

Binomial name
- Atriplex sagittata Borkh.

= Atriplex sagittata =

Species of flowering plant

Atriplex sagittata is a species of flowering plant belonging to the family Amaranthaceae.

Its native range is Central and Eastern Europe to Central Asia. It is an annual plant that grows mainly in the temprate biome
