= Atriplex dioica =

Scientific classification
- Kingdom: Plantae
- Clade: Tracheophytes
- Clade: Angiosperms
- Clade: Eudicots
- Order: Caryophyllales
- Family: Amaranthaceae
- Genus: Atriplex
- Species: A. dioica

Binomial name
- Atriplex dioica Raf.

Synonyms
- Atriplex lapathifolia Rydb.; Atriplex patula var. subspicata (Nutt.) S.Watson; Atriplex subspicata (Nutt.) Rydb.; Chenopodium subspicatum Nutt.

Species of flowering plant

Atriplex dioica is a species of saltbush known by the common names saline saltbush and halberdleaf orach. It is native to much of the United States and southern Canada, where it most often grows in saline and alkaline soils.

== Description ==
Atriplex dioica is an annual herb which varies in appearance, growing erect up to 150 cm (5 feet) tall, with a greenish striate stem. The greenish or reddish leaves are lance-shaped to arrowhead-shaped and may exceed 8 centimeters (3.2 inches) in length. The male and female flowers are borne in small, hard clusters.

== Taxonomy ==
Atriplex dioica was first described as a species by Constantine Samuel Rafinesque in 1818. It was subsequently described and named as Atriplex subspicata by Per Axel Rydberg in 1906 correcting an earlier description by Thomas Nuttall from 1818 where it was named Chenopodium subspicatum. As of 2023 Plants of the World Online and many prominent botanists including Jennifer Ackerfield and K.W. Allred consider the description by Rafinesque to have precedence and now classify it as Atriplex dioica.
