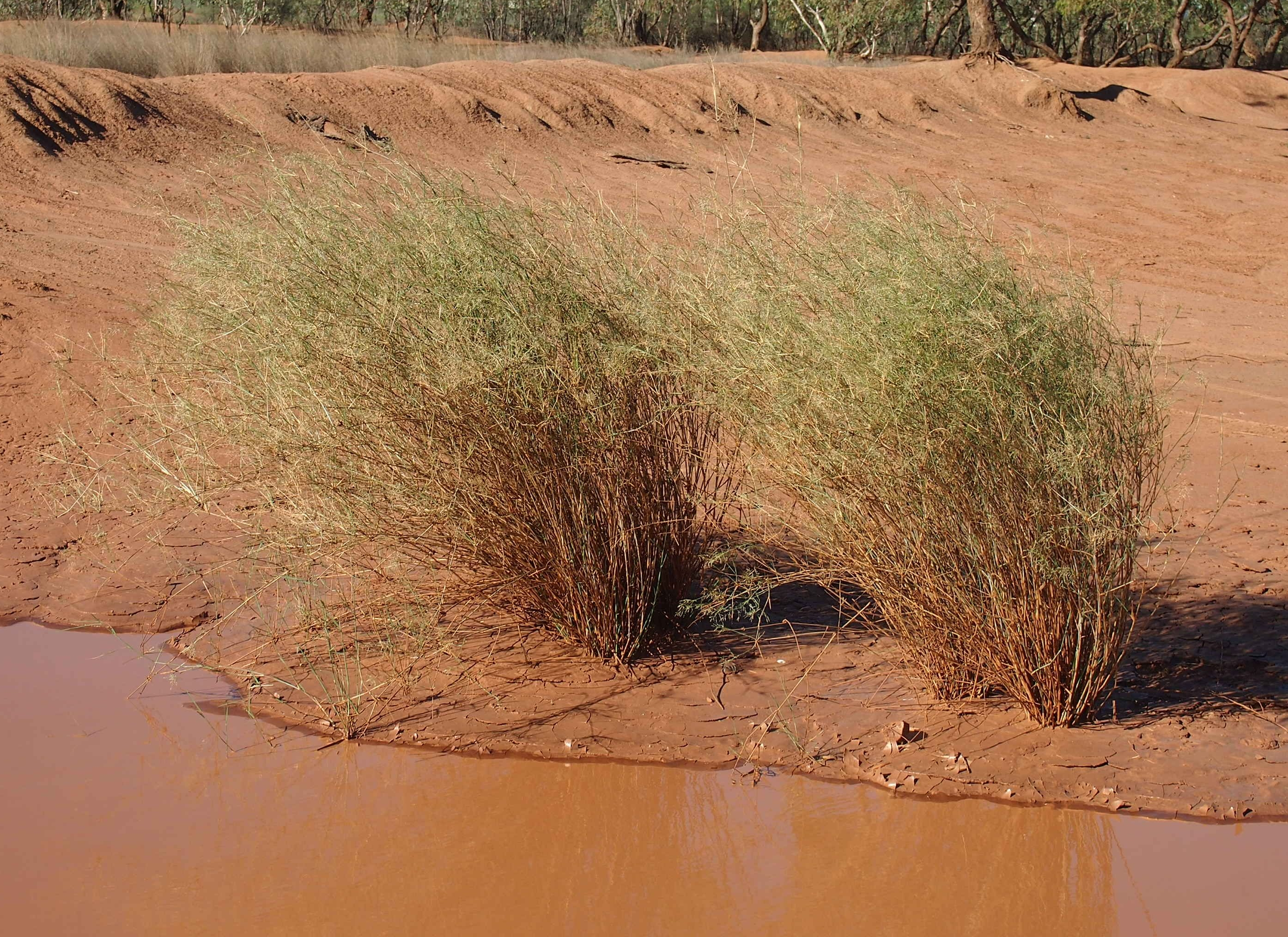

Scientific classification
- Kingdom: Plantae
- Clade: Tracheophytes
- Clade: Angiosperms
- Clade: Monocots
- Clade: Commelinids
- Order: Poales
- Family: Poaceae
- Subfamily: Chloridoideae
- Genus: Eragrostis
- Species: E. australasica

Binomial name
- Eragrostis australasica (Steud.) C.E.Hubb.
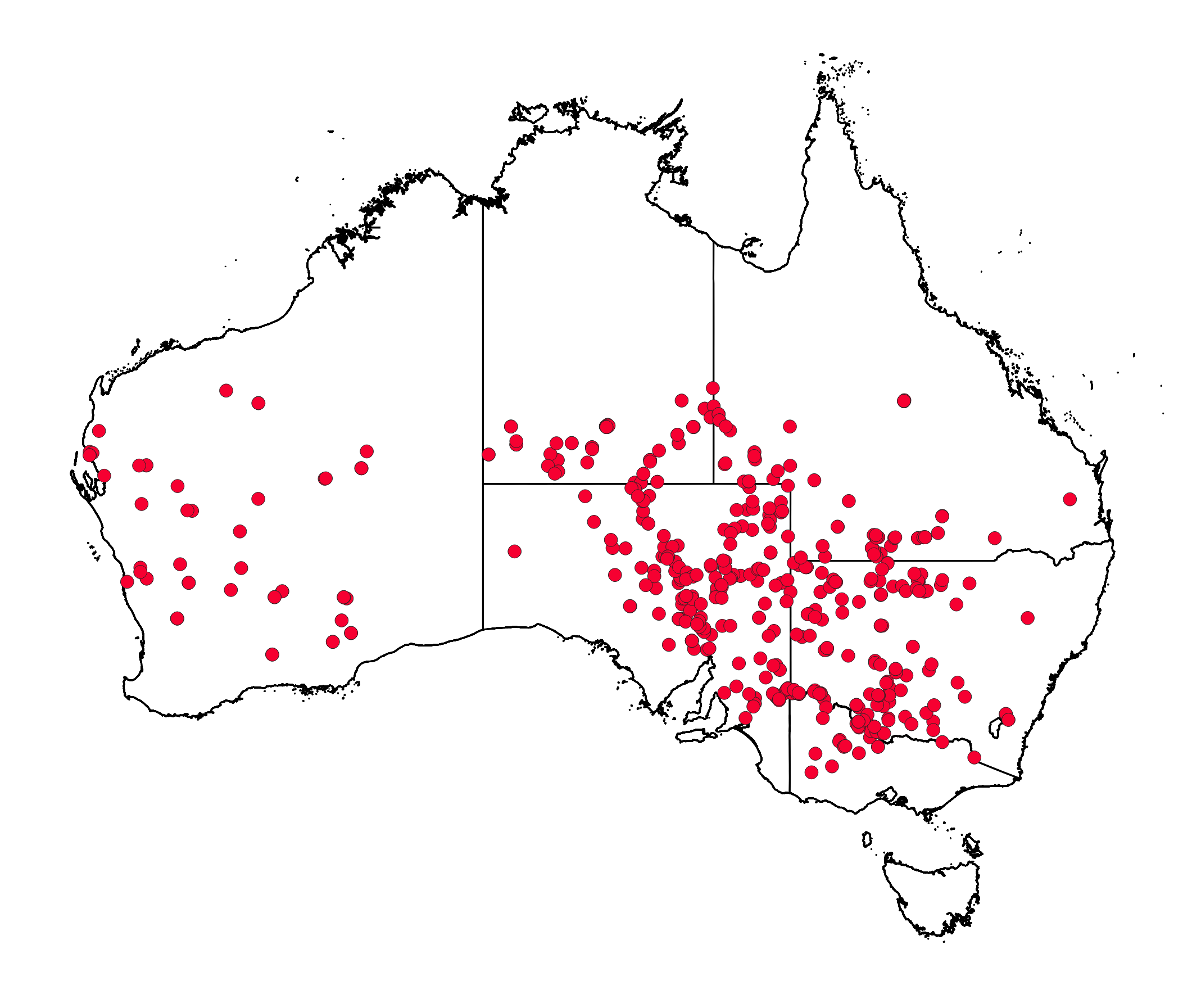
- Occurrence data from AVH

Synonyms
- Glyceria australasica Steud., 1854

= Eragrostis australasica =

Species of plant

Eragrostis australasica, commonly known as swamp canegrass, is a tussock grass, in the subfamily Chloridoideae of the family Poaceae, that is endemic to Australia. It is a tufted perennial with strongly branched, cane-like culms, that grows up to 2.4 m in height. It is typically found on periodically flooded land in arid and semi-arid regions.
