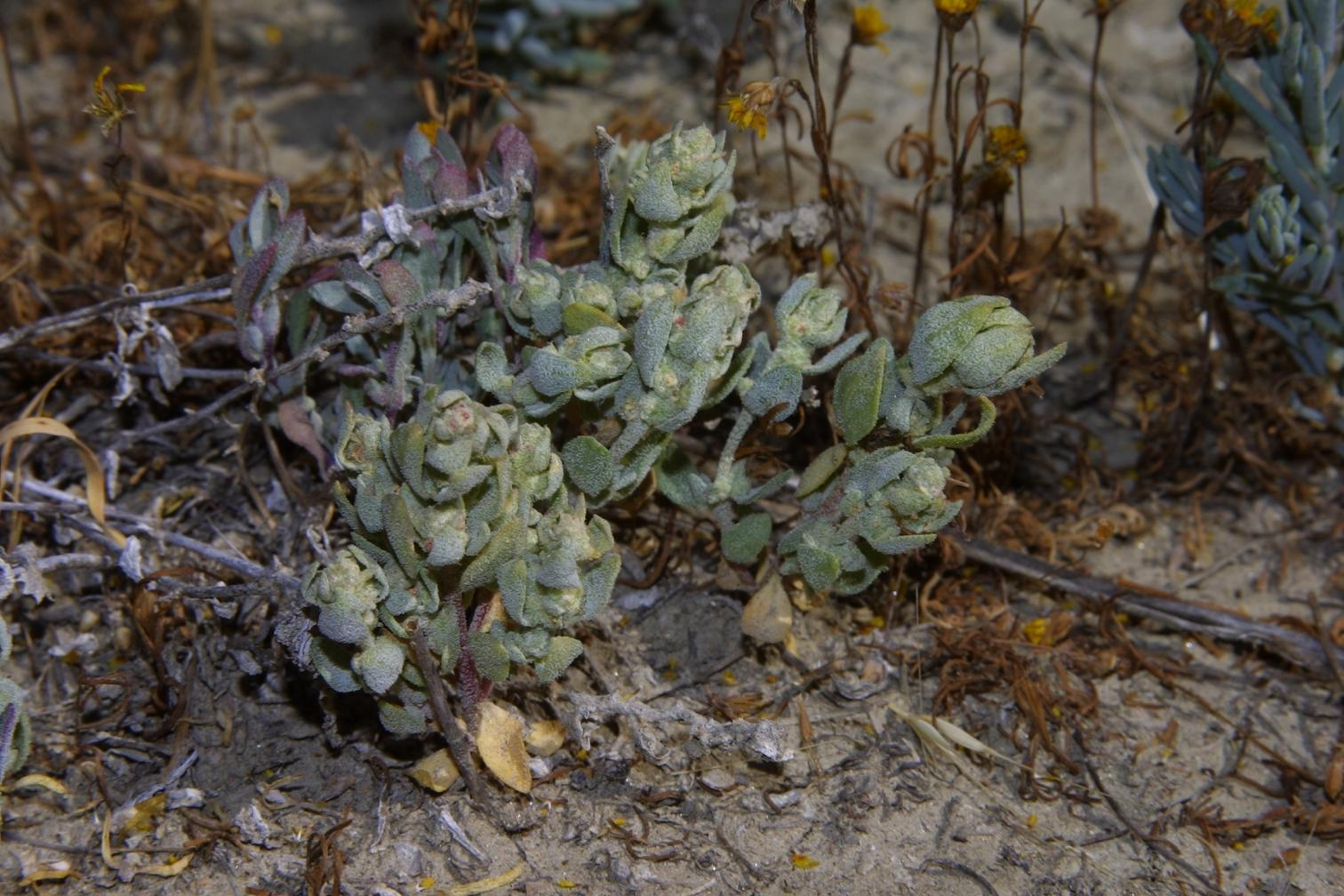
- Atriplex coronata var. notatior (San Jacinto Valley crownscale)

Scientific classification
- Kingdom: Plantae
- Clade: Embryophytes
- Clade: Tracheophytes
- Clade: Angiosperms
- Clade: Eudicots
- Order: Caryophyllales
- Family: Amaranthaceae
- Genus: Atriplex
- Species: A. coronata

Binomial name
- Atriplex coronata S.Wats.

= Atriplex coronata =

Species of flowering plant

Atriplex coronata is a species of saltbush known by the common name crownscale. It is endemic to California.

== Distribution ==
The halophyte plant grows in areas of saline and alkaline soils in the Central Valley and nearby slopes of the Inner California Coast Ranges in Central California; and the South Coast region of Southern California.

== Description ==
Atriplex coronata is an annual herb producing stiff erect or leaning straw-colored stems up to about 30 centimeters tall. The gray scaly leaves are one or two centimeters long.

The flowers are generally oval shaped. The seeds are just over a millimeter long.

=== Varieties ===
There are two or three varieties of this species. They include:

- Atriplex coronata var. notatior — San Jacinto Valley crownscale, limited to the San Jacinto River valley in western Riverside County. It is as an endangered species since being listed on the federal level in 1998.
