= Atriplex pusilla =

Scientific classification
- Kingdom: Plantae
- Clade: Tracheophytes
- Clade: Angiosperms
- Clade: Eudicots
- Order: Caryophyllales
- Family: Amaranthaceae
- Genus: Atriplex
- Species: A. pusilla

Binomial name
- Atriplex pusilla (Torr. ex S.Wats.) S.Wats.

Species of flowering plant

Atriplex pusilla is a species of saltbush known by the common names smooth saltbush and dwarf orach. It is native to the Northwestern United States from California to Idaho, where it grows in saline and alkaline soils, such as those near hot springs and ephemeral ponds.

== Description ==
This is a small annual herb producing a stiff, branching, reddish-green stem which approaches 30 centimeters in maximum height. The thick, fleshy leaves are rounded in shape and less than 2 centimeters long. The tiny flowers are borne in pairs or singly.
