= Atriplex valdesii =

Scientific classification
- Kingdom: Plantae
- Clade: Tracheophytes
- Clade: Angiosperms
- Clade: Eudicots
- Order: Caryophyllales
- Family: Amaranthaceae
- Genus: Atriplex
- Species: A. valdesii

Binomial name
- Atriplex valdesii Flores Olv.

Species of flowering plant

Atriplex valdesii is a plant species endemic to Mexico. It is known from the States of Zacatecas and San Luis Potosí. It grows is saline soils in desert areas and sometimes in disturbed habitats.

Atriplex valdesii is an annual, monoecious herb prostrate against the ground and forming mats. Stems are up to 50 long, reddish. Leaves are alternate, up to 14 mm long, sometimes with small teeth on the margins. Flowers occur in clumps at intervals along a long flowering stalk up to 10 cm long.
