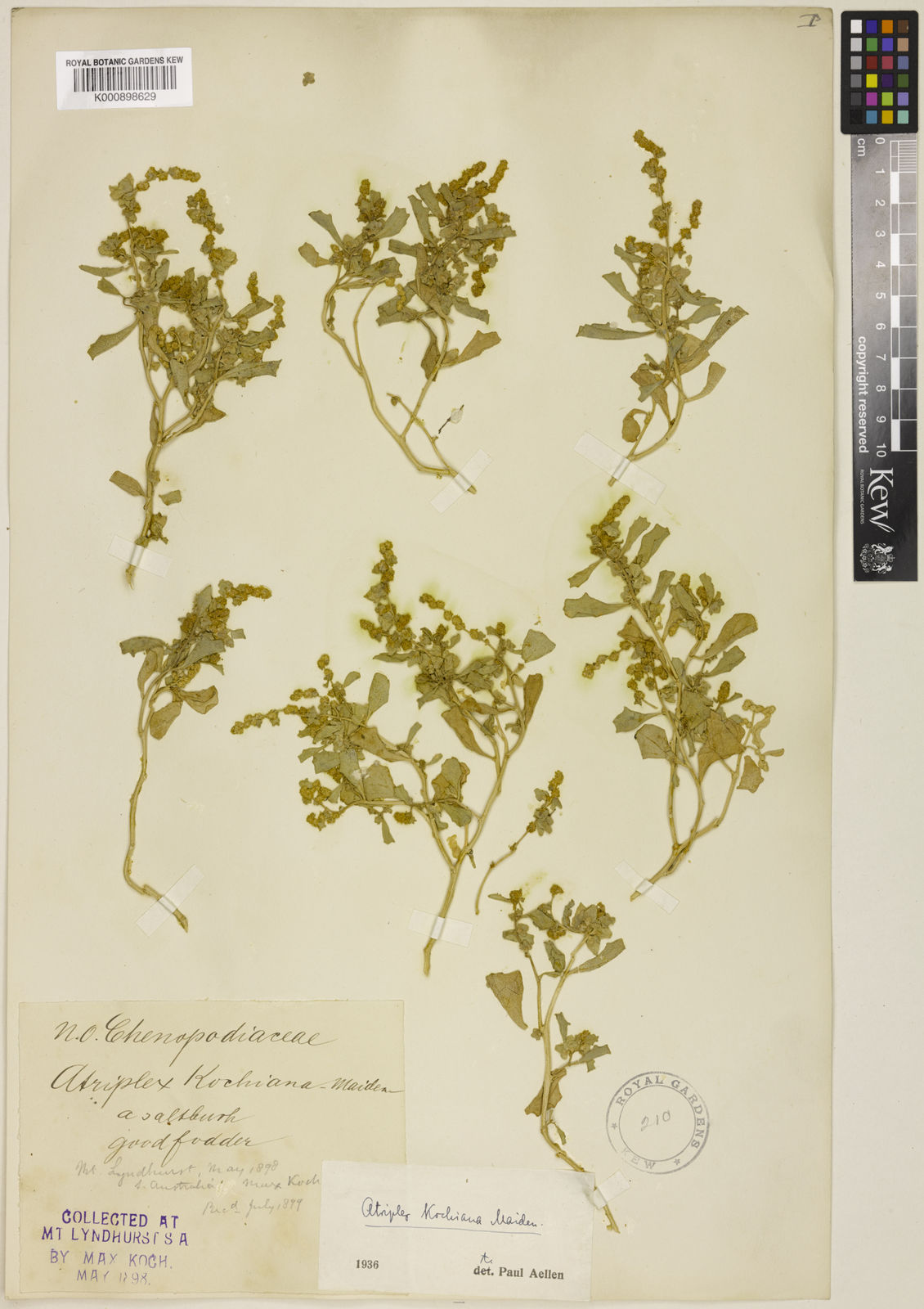
- Taxonomic record at the Royal Botanic Gardens in Kew

Scientific classification
- Kingdom: Plantae
- Clade: Embryophytes
- Clade: Tracheophytes
- Clade: Angiosperms
- Clade: Eudicots
- Order: Caryophyllales
- Family: Amaranthaceae
- Genus: Atriplex
- Species: A. kochiana

Binomial name
- Atriplex kochiana Maiden, 1897
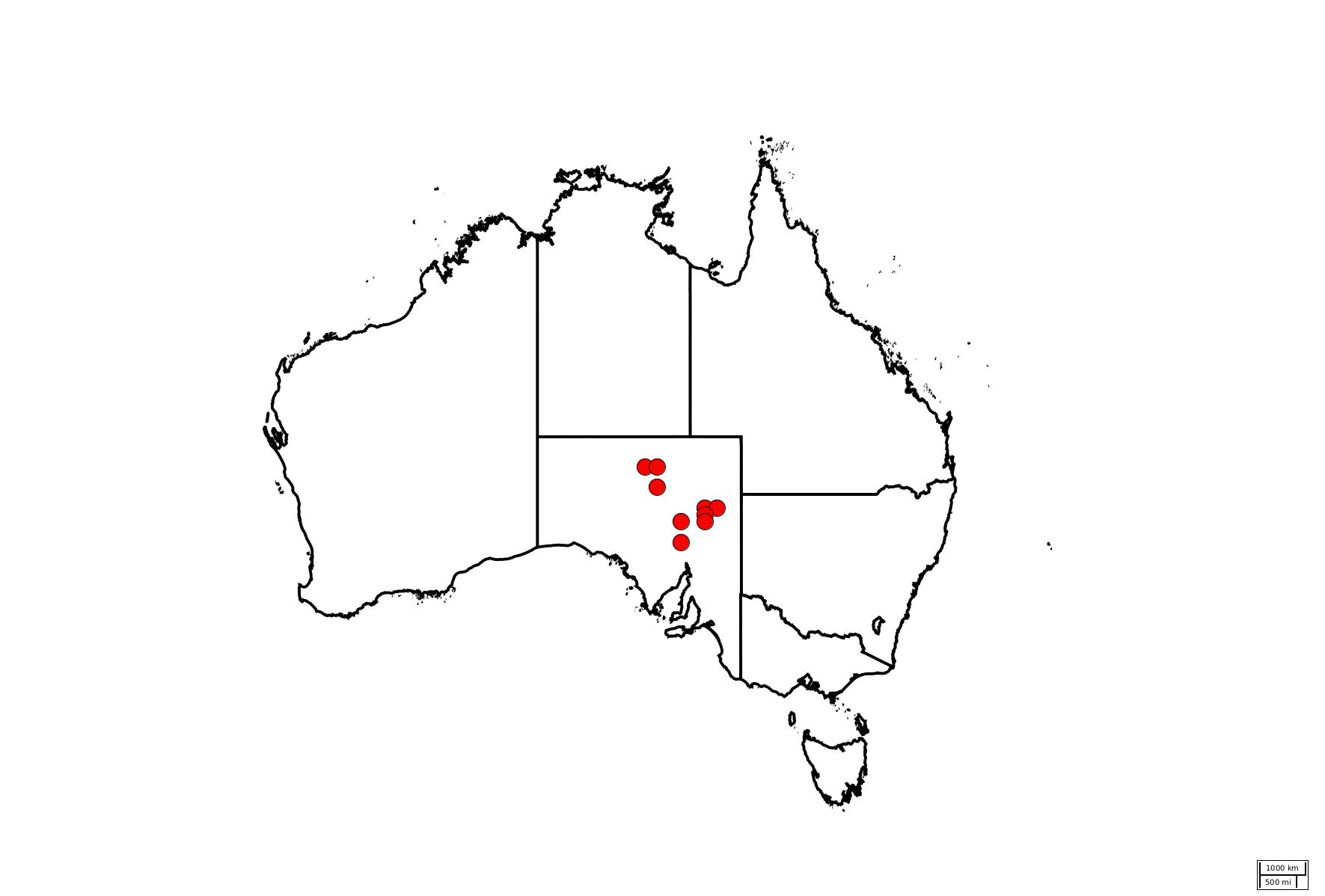
- Occurrence data for A. kochiana from the Australasian Virtual Herbarium

= Atriplex kochiana =

Species of flowering plant

Atriplex kochiana, commonly known as Koch's saltbush, is a native Australian desert shrub from the Amaranthaceae family. The species, which is part of the Atriplex genus, is endemic to South Australia's arid landscapes, and only occurs in a small number of places in the Lake Torrens and Oodnadatta regions. As such, it is considered 'very rare' in South Australia.

== Description ==
The species grows as either an annual or short-lived perennial shrub, with an erect rounded growth form up to 40 cm in height.

The thin silvery-grey-green leaves are distinguished by the presence of a scaly sheen on both the adaxial and abaxial surfaces. The leaf base is cuneate with a very broadly obovate lamina.

Both the male and female plants flower, with the male flowers taking on the form of either continuous or disjunct slender spikes, and the female flowers forming axillary clusters.

The papery fruit is pale-brown in colour, and is either minutely stipitate or sessile. The base of the fruits are united into a broadly turbinate and compressed tube, which then widens to form the valves. Each fruit has numerous fan-shaped valves with prominent venations, with each valve ranging from 5-8mm in width and 2.5mm in height. The valve form is compressed with an orbicular to ovate shape and a cordate base.

== Taxonomy ==
Atriplex kochiana is one of 61 native Atriplex species in Australia, which are all part of the Amaranthaceae family. The species was first described in 1897 by John. H. Maiden.

In his article, he described the plant as:

A dioecious, occasionally monoecious, erect perennial (or annual with a woody base?) about one to one and a-half feet high, with very angular branches; the whole plant grey with a scaly tomentum.

== Etymology ==
Atriplex originates from the word atriplexuma, the Latin name for plants in this genus. Many Atriplex species are halophytes.

The species epithet was chosen to honour Heinrich Ludwig Max Koch, who had collected the sample in the Mt Lyndhurst area, and who Maiden described as a "very intelligent collector". The suffix -iana in kochiana indicates that it is an eponym.
