= Atriplex billardierei =

Scientific classification
- Kingdom: Plantae
- Clade: Tracheophytes
- Clade: Angiosperms
- Clade: Eudicots
- Order: Caryophyllales
- Family: Amaranthaceae
- Genus: Atriplex
- Species: A. billardierei

Binomial name
- Atriplex billardierei (Moq.) Hook.f.

Synonyms
- Theleophyton billardierei Moq.; Obione billardieri Moq.; Atriplex chrystallina Hook.f.; Theleophyton chrystallina Hook.f.

Tasmanian plant species

Atriplex billardierei, commonly known as glistening saltbush or crystalwort, is a species of flowering plant in the family Amaranthaceae. This species is native to coastal Tasmania, Australia, and parts of New Zealand.

== Description ==
Atriplex billardierei is a low-growing, spreading shrub with lightly branched, yellow to cream stems 10-150mm long. The stems are succulent and root at the nodes, allowing the plant to spread across the substrate. Leaves are broadly elliptic to ovate, measuring 5-20mm long and 2-7mm wide, with a very short petiole (0.5-1mm). They are thick, fleshy and glaucous green in colour. Both leaves and stems are covered in deciduous, spherical papillae and watery bladder hairs, giving the plant a glistening or crystalline appearance, a characteristic reflected in the common name glistening saltbush and crystalwort. This feature distinguishes the species from the similar Atriplex prostrata, which occupies similar habitats but has characteristic arrowhead-shaped leaves and no bladder hairs.

The species is monoecious, bearing separate male and female flowers on the same plant. Male flowers occur in the upper leaf axils or in terminal clusters of 3-4 (rarely solitary), and have five green to cream perianth lobes (1-2mm long). The lobes are elliptic to oblong and hooded in shape, with an inflexed (cucullate) apex. Female flowers are axillary, occurring singly or in pairs, and are minute (1-2mm long). They lack a perianth and are enclosed by bracteoles fused for most of their length, which are covered in glistening papillae. Fruiting bracteoles become tough and leathery, turning light brown to tan. Seeds are circular, with a smooth, chestnut-brown testa. Another distinguishing feature of A. billardierei is the orientation of the seed, which is initially parallel to the bracts but twists during maturation to lie at approximately 90 degrees to them.

== Taxonomy ==
The genus Atriplex derives from the Latin atriplex, meaning “orache”, a name used for plants historically consumed as a substitute for spinach. The specific epithet billardierei honours the French botanist Jacques-Julien Houtou de Labillardière (1755–1834).

== Habitat and distribution ==
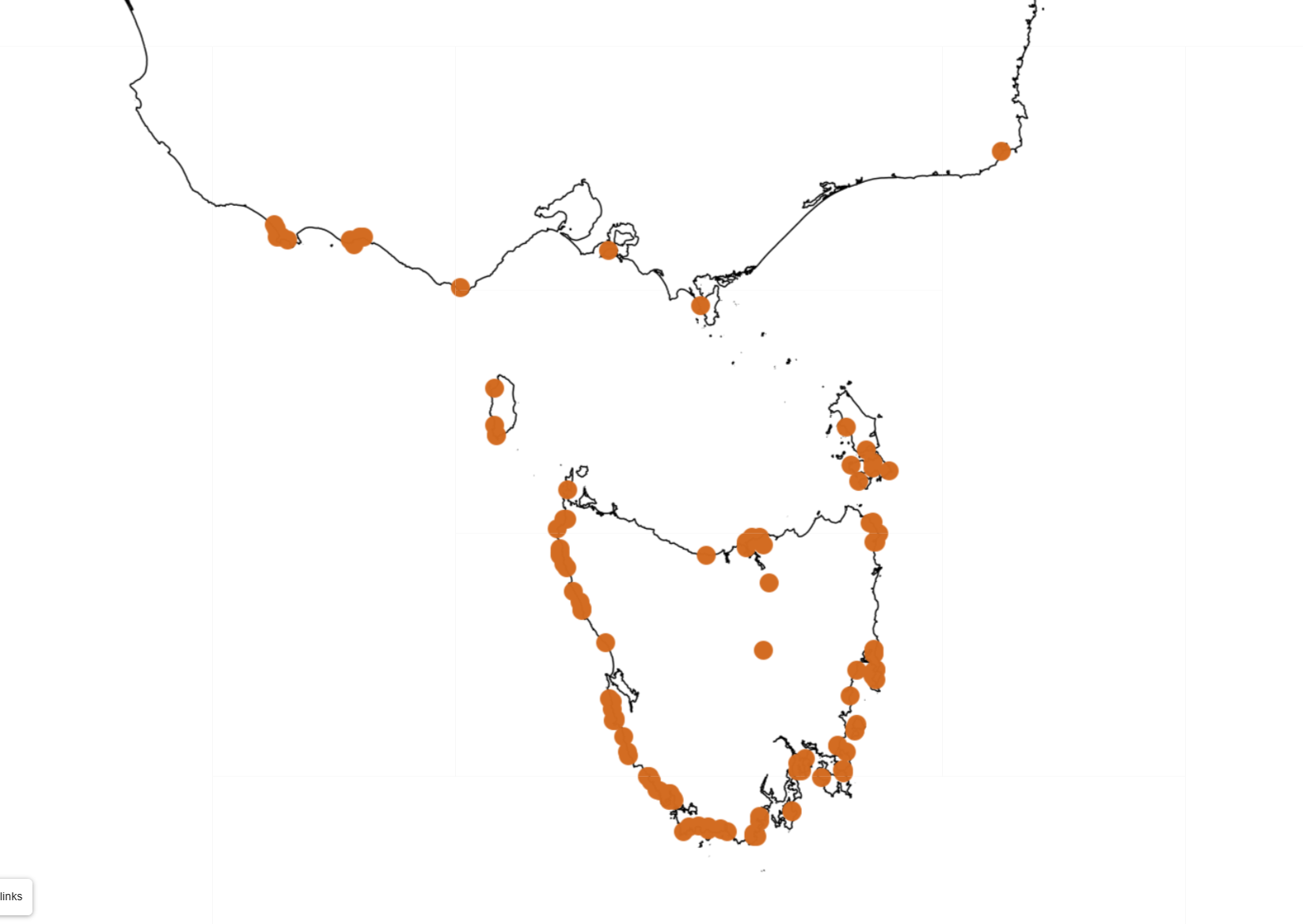
Distribution of Atriplex billardierei in Tasmania from Atlas of Living Australia.

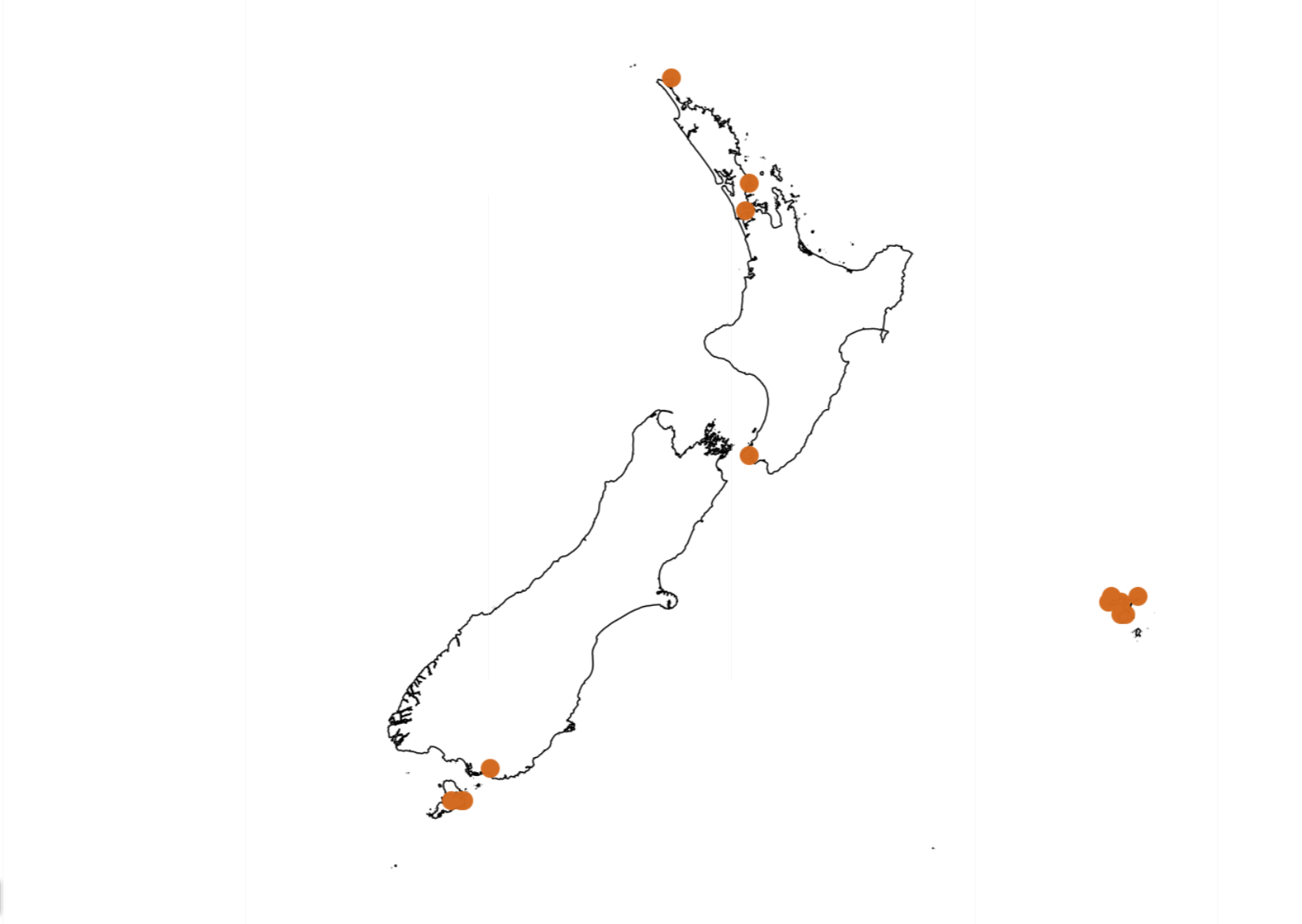
Distribution of Atriplex billardierei in New Zealand from Atlas of Living Australia.

Atriplex billardierei occurs along coastal regions of Tasmania and parts of New Zealand, including the South Island, Stewart Island/Rakiura, and the Chatham Islands. It grows primarily on sandy beaches in the strand zone, typically just above the high tide mark, where wind and wave action cause sand to accumulate in low mounds and banks. The species generally favours sheltered beaches where sand deposition occurs and is often associated with freshwater streams or seepage areas.

The species was formerly recorded from coastal south-eastern and south-western Victoria but is now considered extinct there.

== Ecology ==
As a member of the saltbush genus Atriplex, Atriplex billardierei is a halophyte adapted to saline environments. Like other species in the genus, it tolerates high salt concentrations by accumulating and storing salts within its leaf tissues, enabling it to survive in coastal soils affected by salt spray and salinisation.

Populations of A. billardierei are often small and spatially isolated along coastlines. These environments are highly dynamic, and population sizes can fluctuate considerably from year to year. Storm activity can alter beach structure and influence the burial or exposure of seeds, affecting opportunities for seedling establishment. The species is adapted for dispersal in coastal systems. Seeds may be dispersed by wind or granivory, but are primarily dispersed by water. Seeds are capable of surviving transport in seawater and may germinate more successfully following immersion in salt water. However, successful germination typically requires subsequent exposure to freshwater, which may act as an environmental cue indicating that the seed has reached a suitable site for establishment. This is consistent with the species’ frequent occurrence near freshwater seepages and stream outlets along beaches.

== Threats and conservation ==
In New Zealand, Atriplex billardierei is classified as Nationally Endangered under the New Zealand Threat Classification System (2023), reflecting a small population size and an ongoing decline in distribution. In Australia, the species is listed as extinct in Victoria under the Flora and Fauna Guarantee Act 1988 (2022), although it remains extant in coastal regions of Tasmania. Historical occurrence records from Victoria are retained in databases such as the Atlas of Living Australia, but no current populations are known.

Populations of A.billardierei are subject to a range of threats, including erosion, storm inundation, and human disturbance such as trampling. Competition with introduced strand species is also considered a potential threat. In Tasmania, species such as Cakile maritima and Atriplex prostrata have expanded in range and may be displacing A. billardierei, although further research is required to confirm this relationship.
