= Atriplex fruticulosa =

Conservation status
- Vulnerable (NatureServe)

Scientific classification
- Kingdom: Plantae
- Clade: Tracheophytes
- Clade: Angiosperms
- Clade: Eudicots
- Order: Caryophyllales
- Family: Amaranthaceae
- Genus: Atriplex
- Species: A. fruticulosa

Binomial name
- Atriplex fruticulosa Jeps.

Species of flowering plant

Atriplex fruticulosa is a species of saltbush known by the common names ball saltbush and little oak orach.

== Distribution ==
It is endemic to California, where it grows in several types of habitat, usually in areas of saline or alkaline soils.

== Description ==
This is a perennial herb producing an erect stem which branches in the upper half and reaches a maximum height near 50 centimeters. The gray scaly leaves are lance-shaped to narrowly oval and less than 2 centimeters in length. The plant produces spikelike inflorescences of male flowers and small clustered inflorescences of female flowers in the leaf axils.
