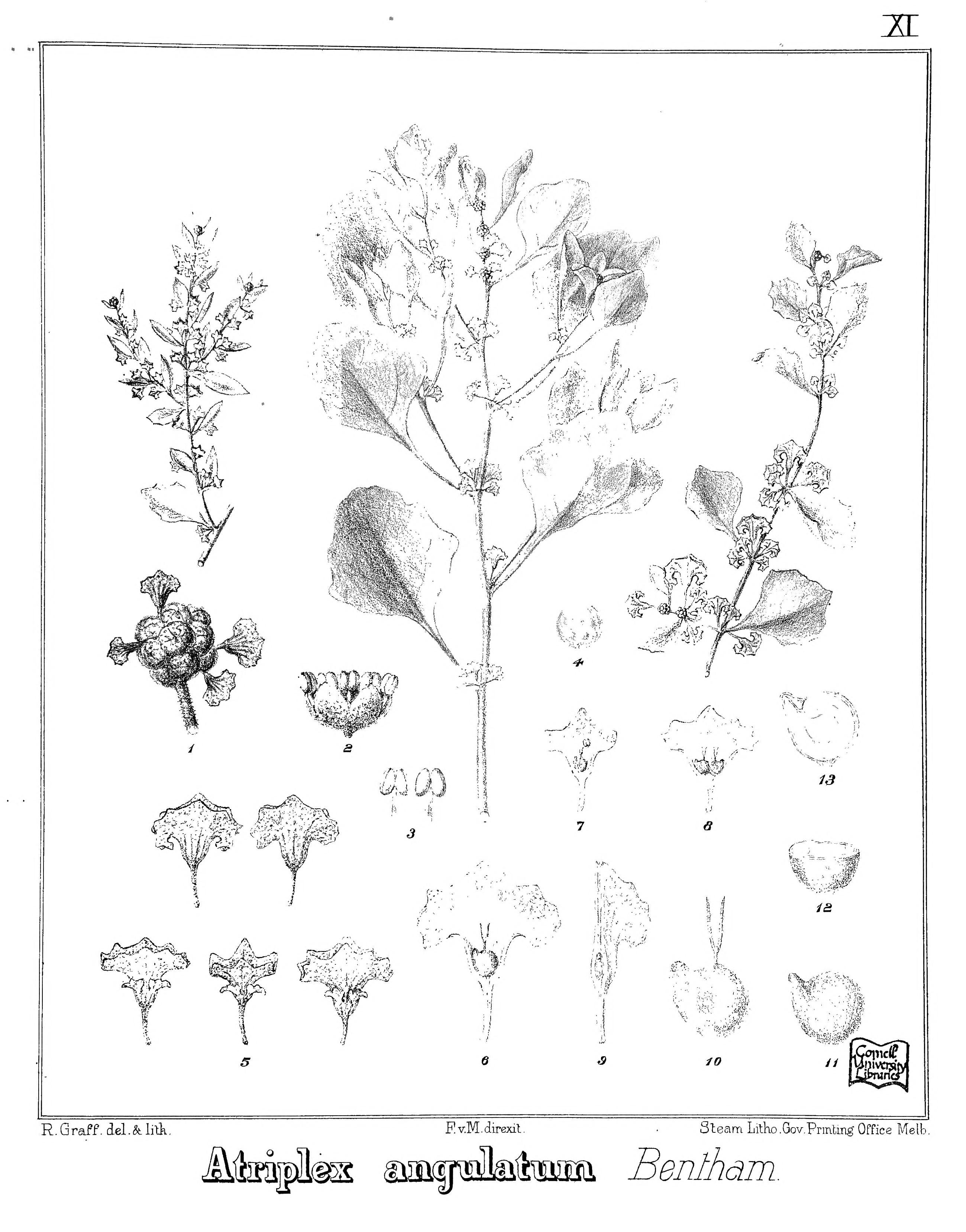

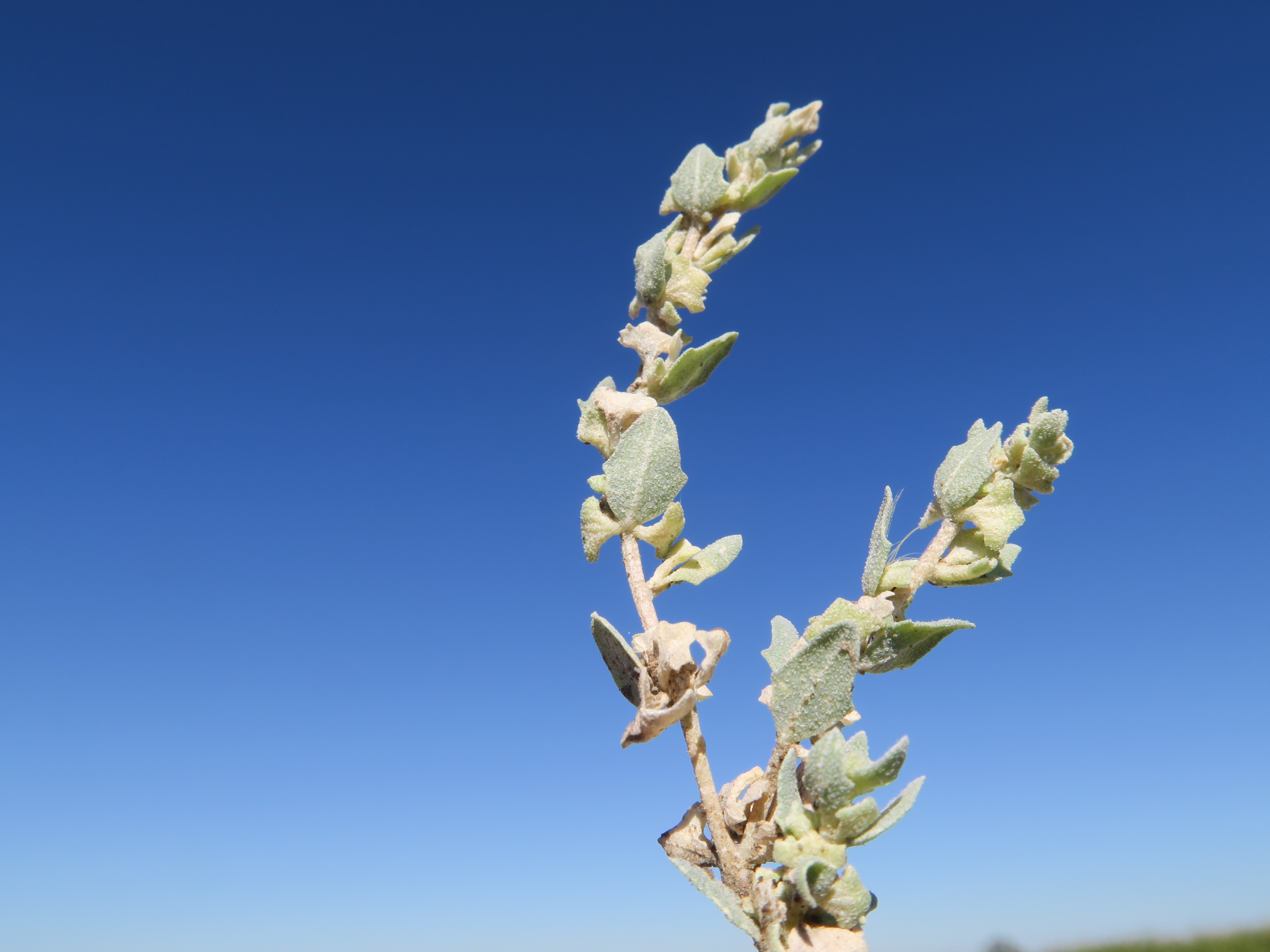

Scientific classification
- Kingdom: Plantae
- Clade: Embryophytes
- Clade: Tracheophytes
- Clade: Spermatophytes
- Clade: Angiosperms
- Clade: Eudicots
- Order: Caryophyllales
- Family: Amaranthaceae
- Genus: Atriplex
- Species: A. angulata

Binomial name
- Atriplex angulata Benth.
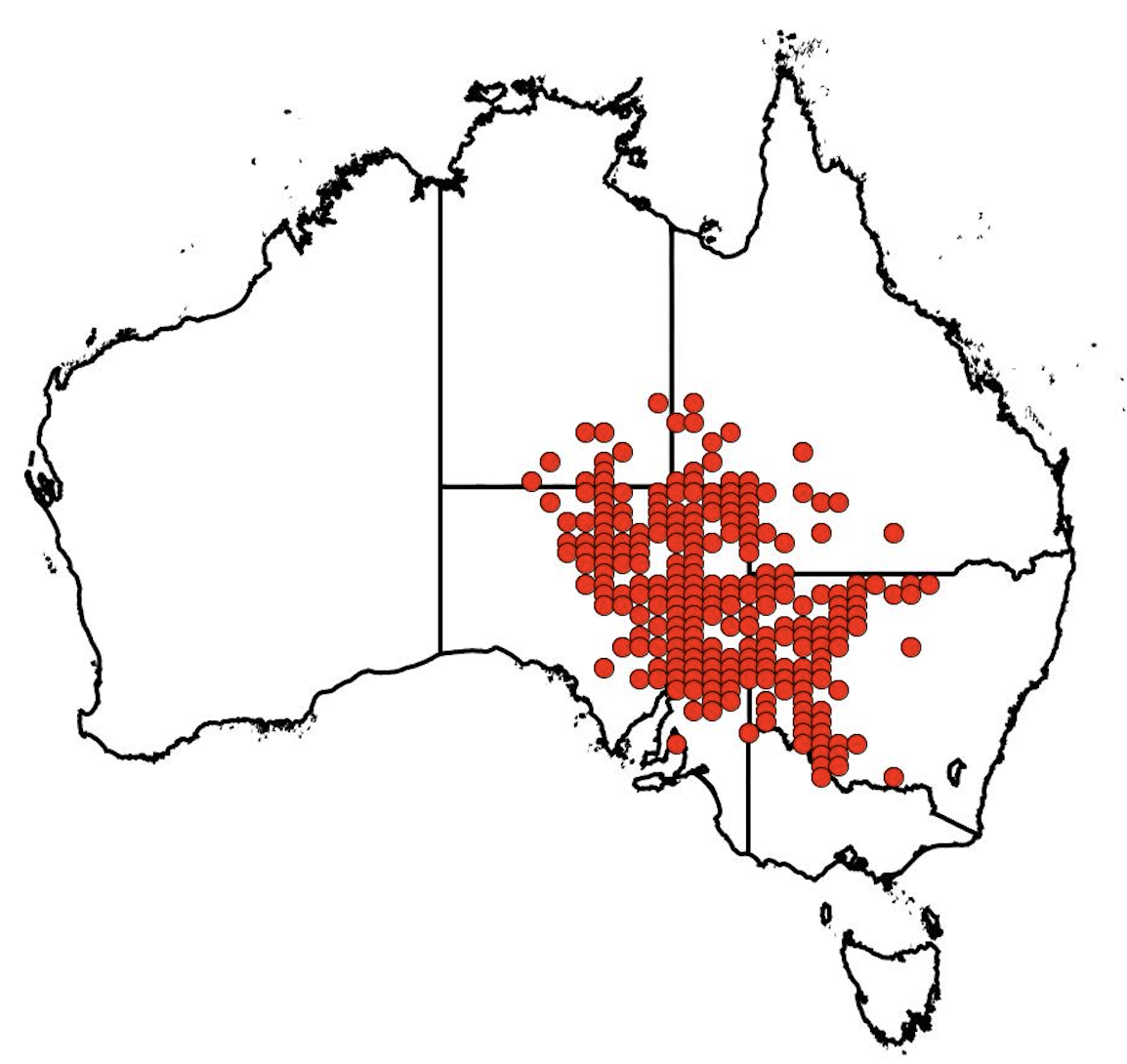
- Recorded occurrences of A. angulata from the Atlas of Living Australia

Synonyms
- Atriplex angulata var. campanulatiformis Aellen; Obione angulata (Benth.) G.L.Chu

= Atriplex angulata =

Species of plant in the amaranth family

Atriplex angulata, commonly known as fan saltbush or angular saltbush, is a species of flowering plant in the family Amaranthaceae. It is an annual to short-lived perennial subshrub, native to Australia, distributed throughout drier parts of the mainland.

== Description ==
Atriplex angulata generally appears as a spreading, rounded subshrub, mealy-grey in colour with woody stems and growing to approximately 30 to 40 cm (12 to 16 in) high. The leaves of this species, like many others of its genus, have been noted to vary in shape and texture. Leaf shapes from broad ovate to rhombic have been described, ranging from smooth, entire margins to dentate – or slightly toothed – margins, with a broad apex tip. Leaf length is generally 1.5 to 4 cm (0.6 to 1.6 in) long. Leaf texture also varies, generally occurring with a hairy, or scurfy, texture on both surfaces however, sometimes appearing shiny, and are usually thin and leathery to touch.

The bracteole, or leaf-like structure found between the bract and flower of the plant, is a distinguishing feature. While the shape and texture has also been noted to vary, the bracteole is generally 8 to 12 mm wide at the apex and 10 mm long, with a fused, cylindrical base and an upper, flattened fan-shape displaying shallowly-toothed margins and net veins.

Atriplex angulata is monoecious. Male flowers are found in compact clusters to form short, interrupted spikes on the upper tips of the stems, while female flowers are found scattered in axillary clusters, where the leaves meet the stem of the shrub. Typically, the female flowers display the distinguishing fan-shaped bracteoles, encasing the firm, spongy-bodied seed.

== Ecology ==
Atriplex angulata is distributed widely across the inner part of mainland Australia, with occurrences recorded in Queensland, New South Wales, Victoria, South Australia and the Northern Territory. It is not reported to be an abundant species, but can be locally common in patches. This native species is not strongly monitored for conservation status, however, is listed as critically endangered in the state of Victoria.

Flowering occurs mainly in Spring, beginning in July through to October, however has been noted to occur throughout the year. Wind is the major mode of seed and pollen dispersal.

Atriplex angulata is more commonly found in low shrubland landscapes with drier soil types, however can occur across a wide range of soil and vegetation types and as such, is difficult to classify to one habitat. Not a large part of native, or grazing animal diets, in times when grasses become sparse, dry or unpalatable, animals have been noted to graze on it more readily. Whilst not a major contributor to forage alternatives, as a low, spreading shrub, Atriplex angulata provides important ground cover in arid to semi-arid regions, providing shelter for small animals and insects and protecting against soil erosion, which in turn aids the healthy functioning of local nutrient and water cycling.

== Taxonomy ==
Atriplex angulata belongs to the Atriplex genus, one of the most diverse genera of the family Amaranthaceae. The genus was first recorded by Carl Linneus in 1753, with the first record of Atriplex angulata attributed to George Bentham in 1870. Molecular studies appear to support the development of the Atriplex genus in Eurasia, reaching Australia in the late Miocene epoch and diversifying from there. Flowering body morphology is generally considered the key classification factor, with genetic methods being increasingly used, however classification has been historically difficult as many species display convergent and discrete morphological and genetic characteristics.

A potential contributing factor to this variability is the tendency for Atriplex subspecies to intergrade, or breed, thus sharing genetic material with resulting lineages displaying a mixture of characteristics. Atriplex angulata has been recorded as intergrading with Atriplex pseudocampanulata, Atriplex intermedia, Atriplex turbinate and Atriplex crassipes.
