= Atriplex serenana =

Scientific classification
- Kingdom: Plantae
- Clade: Tracheophytes
- Clade: Angiosperms
- Clade: Eudicots
- Order: Caryophyllales
- Family: Amaranthaceae
- Genus: Atriplex
- Species: A. serenana

Binomial name
- Atriplex serenana A.Nels.

Species of flowering plant

Atriplex serenana is a species of saltbush known by the common names bractscale and stinking orach. It is native to California and Baja California, where it grows in saline and alkaline soils such as those on alkali flats and beach bluffs.

This is a mat-forming annual herb producing scaly stems up to a meter long. The toothed leaves are 1 to 4 centimeters long. The flowers are generally borne in hard clusters along the stem and there is sometimes a spikelike inflorescence of male flowers at the end of the stem.

There are two varieties of this species.

- The rarer of the two, Davidson's saltscale (var. davidsonii), is limited to the coastline of southern California and Baja California.
