= Atriplex cordulata =

Conservation status
- Imperiled (NatureServe)

Scientific classification
- Kingdom: Plantae
- Clade: Tracheophytes
- Clade: Angiosperms
- Clade: Eudicots
- Order: Caryophyllales
- Family: Amaranthaceae
- Genus: Atriplex
- Species: A. cordulata

Binomial name
- Atriplex cordulata Jeps.

Species of flowering plant

Atriplex cordulata is a species of saltbush known by the common names heartscale and heart-leaf orache. It is endemic to the Central Valley and its San Joaquin Valley of California, where it grows in areas of saline and alkaline soils.

== Description ==
Heart-leaf orache is an annual herb producing one or more erect stems to heights between 10 and 50 centimeters. The branches are scaly gray and have woolly fibers toward the ends. The gray scaly leaves are no bigger than 1.5 centimeters long and most have heart-shaped bases.

The plant has male and female inflorescences which are small hard clusters of flowers. The reddish brown seeds are about 2 millimeters wide. It can be found at elevations up to 375 meters above sea level and blooms between April and October.
