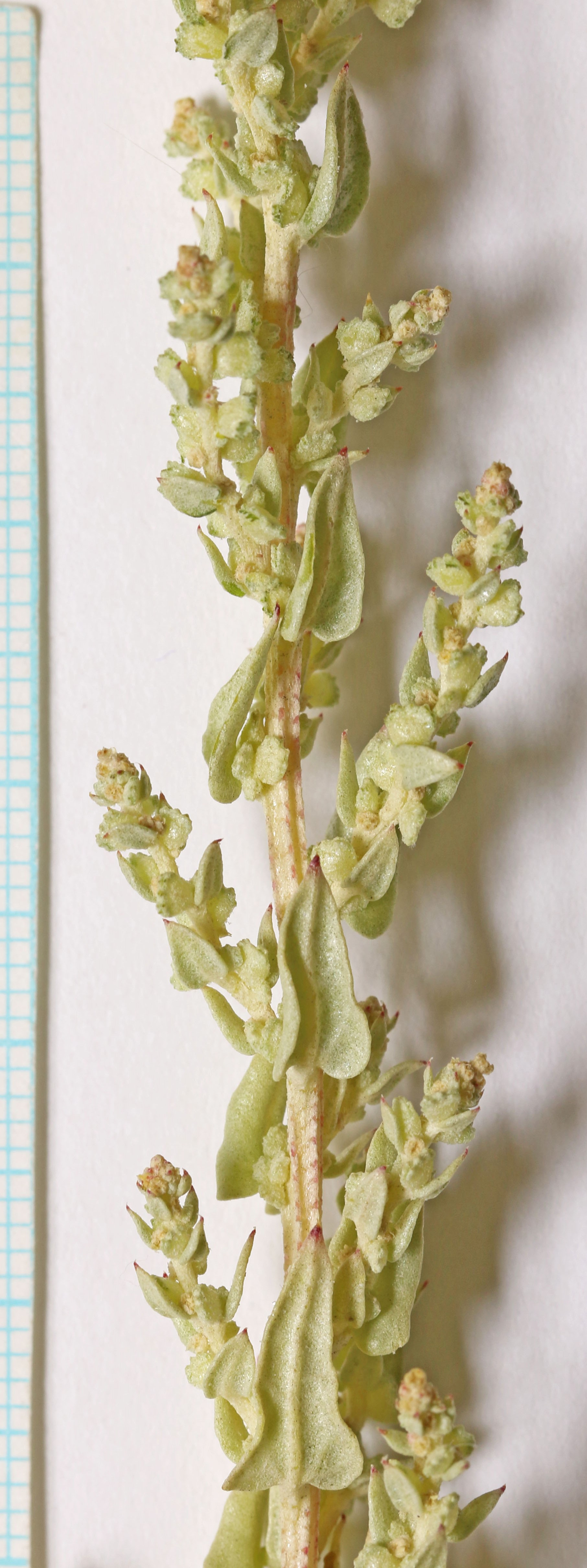

Conservation status
- Secure (NatureServe)

Scientific classification
- Kingdom: Plantae
- Clade: Tracheophytes
- Clade: Angiosperms
- Clade: Eudicots
- Order: Caryophyllales
- Family: Amaranthaceae
- Genus: Atriplex
- Species: A. truncata

Binomial name
- Atriplex truncata (Torr. ex. S.Wats.) A.Gray

= Atriplex truncata =

Species of flowering plant

Atriplex truncata is a species of saltbush known by the common names wedgeleaf saltbush, wedgescale, and wedge orach, native to western North America from British Columbia to California and to New Mexico. It grows in montane to desert habitats with saline soils, such as dry lake beds.

== Description ==
Atriplex truncata is an annual herb producing erect, angled stems which can be higher than 70 centimeters. Leaves are 1 to 4 centimeters long and wedge-shaped. The stems and herbage are generally very scaly and scurfy. Male and female flowers are produced in small clusters in the leaf axils.
