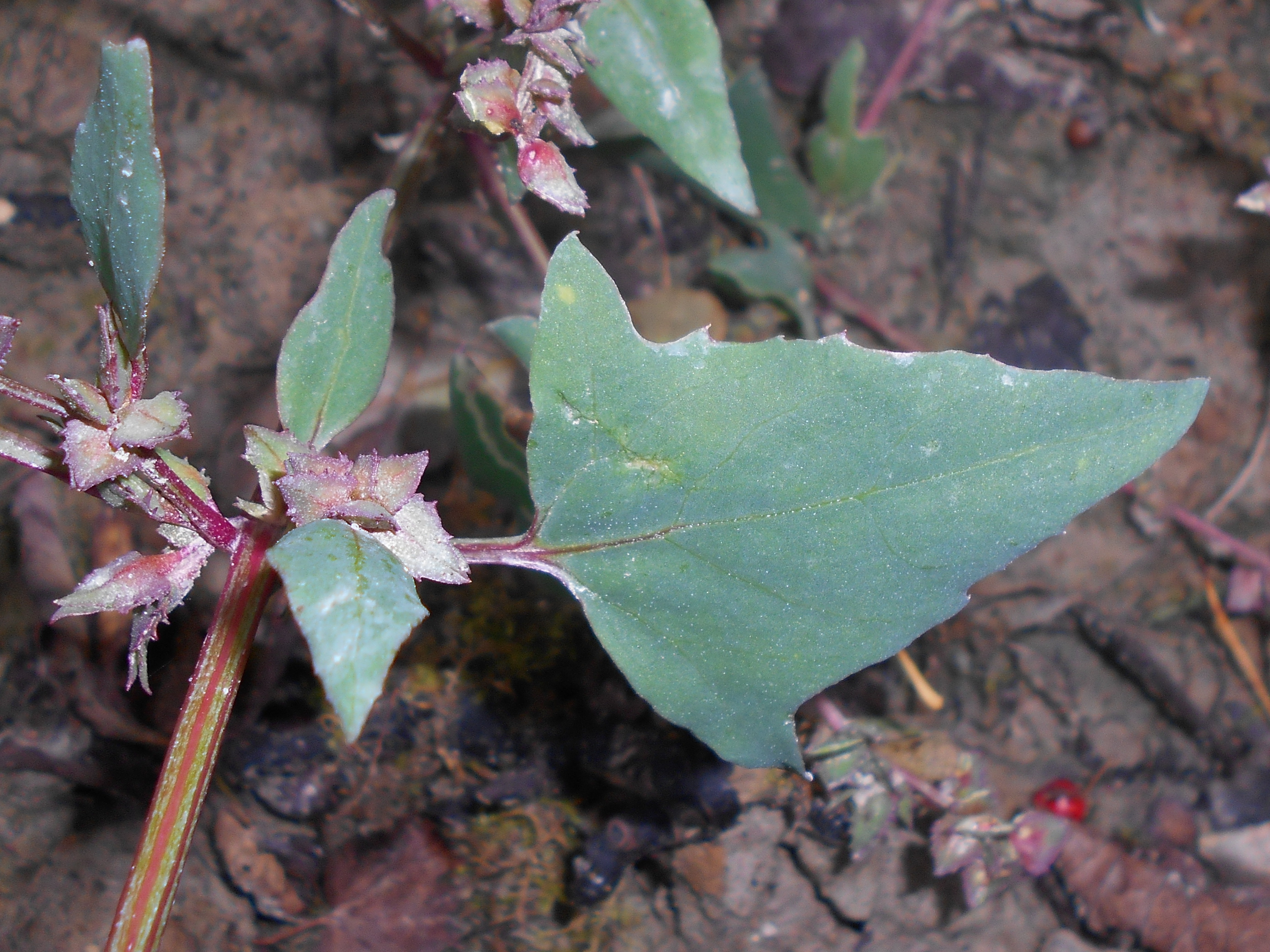
- Leaves
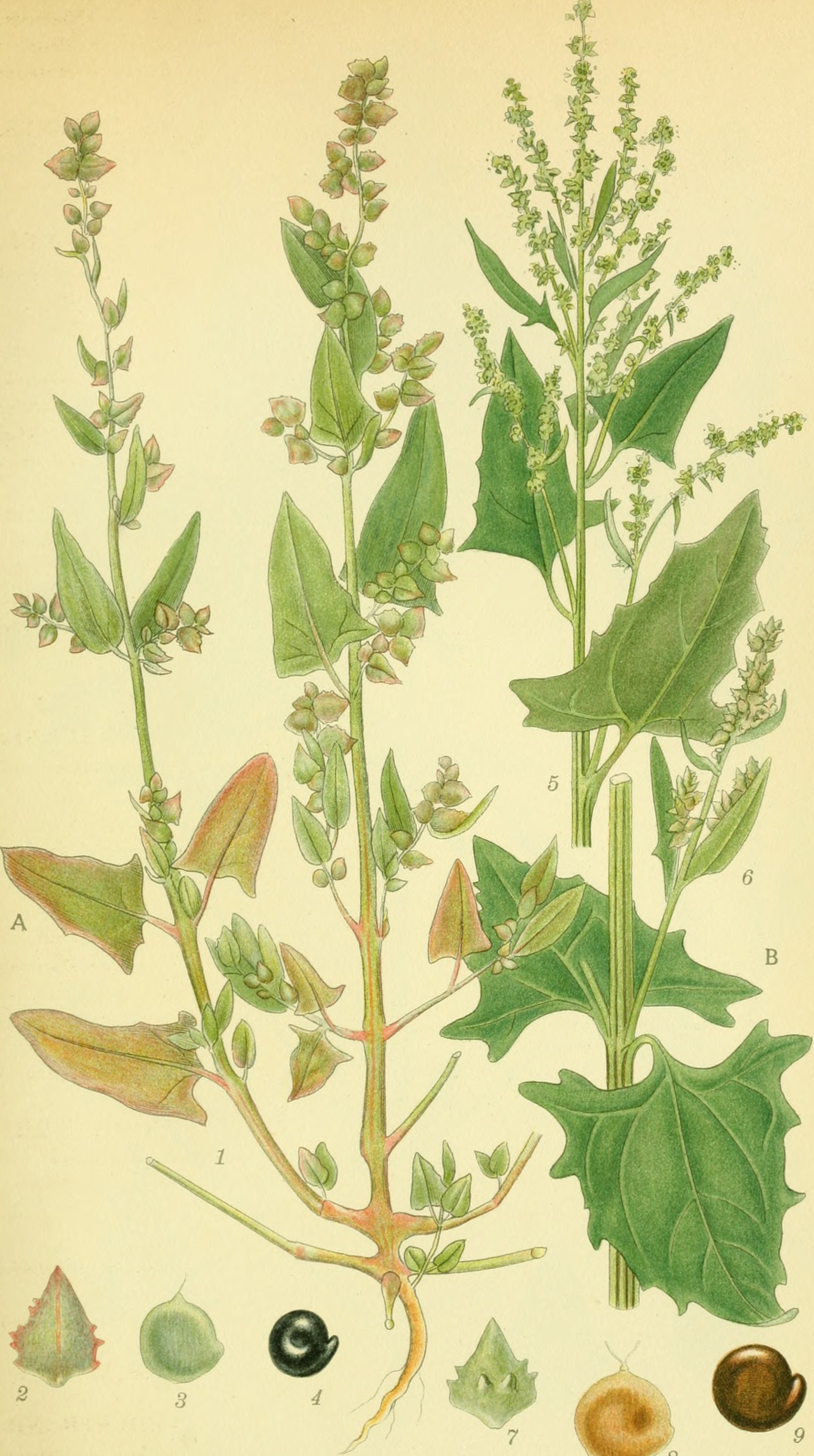
- Botanical illustration

Conservation status
- Secure (NatureServe)

Scientific classification
- Kingdom: Plantae
- Clade: Tracheophytes
- Clade: Angiosperms
- Clade: Eudicots
- Order: Caryophyllales
- Family: Amaranthaceae
- Genus: Atriplex
- Species: A. prostrata

Binomial name
- Atriplex prostrata Boucher ex DC.

Synonyms
- List: Atriplex calotheca (Rafn) Fr.; Atriplex decumbens Schult.; Atriplex deltoidea Bab.; Atriplex flavescens Dumort.; Atriplex gigantea Poir. ex Moq.; Atriplex gracilis Nutt. ex Moq.; Atriplex halimoides Raf.; Atriplex hastata L.; Atriplex hastata subsp. smithii Syme; Atriplex hastata var. calotheca Rafn; Atriplex hastata var. prostrata (Boucher ex DC.) Lange; Atriplex hastata var. salina Wallr. ex Gren.; Atriplex hastata var. triangularis (Willd.) Moq.; Atriplex hastifolia Salisb.; Atriplex integrifolia Krock. ex Steud.; Atriplex lacera Desf.; Atriplex laciniata var. americana Torr.; Atriplex latifolia subsp. prostrata (Boucher ex DC.) Hiitonen; Atriplex latifolia subsp. triangularis (Willd.) Hiitonen; Atriplex latifolia Wahlenb.; Atriplex macrotheca Moq.; Atriplex microcarpa Waldst. & Kit.; Atriplex microsperma Bab.; Atriplex microsperma Waldst. & Kit.; Atriplex microtheca Fr.; Atriplex multifida Desf.; Atriplex novae-zelandiae Aellen; Atriplex oblongifolia Host; Atriplex oppositifolia DC.; Atriplex patula subsp. hastata (L.) H.M.Hall & Clem.; Atriplex patula var. hastata (L.) A.Gray; Atriplex patula var. prostrata (Boucher ex DC.) Mert. & W.D.J.Koch; Atriplex patula var. triangularis (Willd.) Thorne & S.L.Welsh; Atriplex pharaonis Moq.; Atriplex platensis Speg.; Atriplex platysepala Guss.; Atriplex polonica Zapal.; Atriplex prostrata subsp. deltoidea (Bab.) Rauschert; Atriplex prostrata subsp. triangularis (Willd.) Rauschert; Atriplex prostrata var. salina (Wallr.) O.Bolòs & Vigo; Atriplex prostrata var. smithii (Syme) P.D.Sell; Atriplex pugae Phil.; Atriplex ramosissima Nutt. ex Moq.; Atriplex ruderalis Wallr.; Atriplex sackii Rostk. & Schmidt; Atriplex smithii Syme; Atriplex spinacifolia Stokes; Atriplex transsilvanica Schur; Atriplex triangularis Willd.; Atriplex veneta Moq.; Chenopodium hastatum Dumort.; Chenopodium latifolium (Wahlenb.) E.H.L.Krause; Obione corsica Rouy; Obione novae-zelandiae (Aellen) G.L.Chu; Obione platensis (Speg.) G.L.Chu; Schizotheca hastata (L.) Fourr.

= Atriplex prostrata =

Species of flowering plant

Atriplex prostrata, called the spear-leaved orache, hastate orache, thin-leaf orache, triangle orache, and fat hen, is a widespread species of flowering plant in the saltbush genus Atriplex, native to Europe, Macaronesia, northern Africa, Ethiopia, the Middle East, western Siberia, and Central Asia, and introduced to temperate North America, South America, Australia, New Zealand, Korea, Japan, and Primorsky Krai in far eastern Russia. It is a facultative halophyte.

== Subspecies ==
The following subspecies are currently accepted:

- Atriplex prostrata subsp. calotheca (Rafn) M.A.Gust.
- Atriplex prostrata subsp. latifolia (Wahlenb.) Rauschert
- Atriplex prostrata subsp. polonica (Zapal.) Uotila
- Atriplex prostrata subsp. prostrata
