= Annet, Isles of Scilly =

Island in the Isles of Scilly, United Kingdom

Annet
Anet (Cornish)
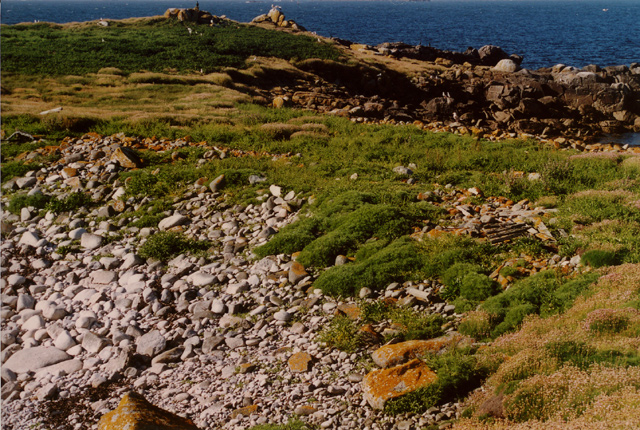
- Central Annet

- Location within Isles of Scilly

Geography
- Coordinates: 49.89626°N 06.37266°W
- OS grid reference: SV864087
- Archipelago: Isles of Scilly

Administration
- United Kingdom
- Civil parish: St Agnes

Demographics
- Population: 0

Annet (Cornish: Anet, lit. 'kittiwake') is the second-largest of the approximately 50 uninhabited Isles of Scilly, one kilometre (1/2 nautical mile) west of St Agnes with a length of one kilometre (5/8 mi) and approximately 22 hectares (54 acres) in area. The low-lying island is almost divided in two by a narrow neck of land at West Porth which can, at times, be covered by waves. At the northern end of the island are the two granite carns of Annet Head and Carn Irish and three smaller carns known as the Haycocks. The rocky outcrops on the southern side of the island, such as South Carn, are smaller. Annet is a bird sanctuary and the main seabird breeding site in Scilly.

The island is closed to the public all year round to limit the disturbance to the breeding seabirds during the summer months and breeding Atlantic Grey Seals during the winter months, for which it has been designated a Site of Special Scientific Interest (SSSI). It is also within part of the Isles of Scilly Area of Outstanding Natural Beauty (AONB), Isles of Scilly Heritage Coast and part of Plantlife's, Isles of Scilly Important Plant Area The island is managed by the Isles of Scilly Wildlife Trust who lease it from the Duchy of Cornwall.

== History ==
Little has been found on Annet in the way of human remains apart from a prehistoric hut circle, a fragmentary field system and several limpet middens. Bones of cattle and sheep were found indicating that they were eaten here and probably grazed the island. It is proposed to designate the whole of Annet as a Scheduled Ancient Monument. The name of the island is first recorded in 1302 as Anet. Also recorded as Anete in 1305, Anet in 1339, Agnet in 1570 and Agnet iland alias Annett in 1650.

In the 19th century Annet was ″used for pasturage by the inhabitants of other islands″ although with only one freshwater seepage there could not have been many animals grazing on the island.

The SS Castleford struck the Crebawethans in June 1877 and led to some of her cargo of 250 to 450 cattle being landed on the island and staying there for up to 10 days. Gurney (1889) reported that "... the animals trampled everything and would have caused an immense amount of damage at the peak of the shearwater and storm petrel nesting season". It seems unlikely that many stayed for 10 days because of the need for fresh water. Cattle were washed up on the Cornish coast as far as Mount's Bay and St Ives. Another ship wrecked nearby, the world's only seven-masted schooner, Thomas W Lawson spilled her cargo of oil on 14 December 1907 causing the loss of many birds. In 1971 Rex Cowan found the wreck of VOC Hollandia together with a large quantity of coins, bronze cannons and mortars. The ship hit Gunner Rock on 13 July 1743 with the loss of 276 lives.

== Natural history ==
The geology of Annet is of Hercynian granite overlain with raised beach deposits. On the southern end there is a "thick bed of soil, part sand and part soil". The island is low-lying with a top height of 18 m and the coast consists of boulder storm beaches. The effects of wind exposure, salt spray and lack of topography, restricts diversity and only 53 species of vascular plants have been recorded. The north of the island is dominated by a well developed, thick, thrift (Armeria maritima) turf whilst the southern part is dominated by dense stands of bracken (Pteridium aquilinum), bramble (Rubus fruticosus) and bluebells (Hyacinthoides non-scripta), with some sand sedge (Carex arenaria) and Yorkshire fog (Holcus lanatus). Thickets of tree mallow (Lavatera arborea) have developed at the back of some of the boulder beaches. There were scattered colonies of shore dock (Rumex rupestris) until a storm in 1982 swept away some of the boulder beaches. One colony remains in the corner of a relatively sheltered beach in the south of the island at a freshwater seepage. Shore dock is one of the primary reasons for the selection of the Isles of Scilly as a Special Area of Conservation (SAC). Annet is the ″British stronghold″ for the lichen Roccella fuciformis. A description of the island by Hilda Quick, a former resident of St Agnes published in 1964 is still relevant today:

Many people are disappointed at being unable to visit the famous bird sanctuary, but in fact, there is very little to see there by day. There will be shearwater corpses lying about, (victims of the gulls) several large colonies of gulls, some oystercatchers, rock pipits, and wrens. The walking on the island is horrid, much of it over loose stones hidden in long grass, some bramble and bracken, and awkward great clumps of thrift. What Annet is famous for is its colonies of Manx shearwaters and storm petrels; but since they nest underground, and only come and go in the dark, there is nothing to be seen of them by day. One has to camp out for the night, which is often a chilly process, and requires special permission. The puffins that use [sic] to breed there in such numbers that their bodies were used for paying rent are now few, and can best be seen from a boat as they swim on the water.

=== Fauna ===
Annet is considered to be of outstanding importance as a seabird colony. Twelve species nest here, of which two, European storm–petrel (Hydrobates pelagicus) and lesser black-backed gull (Larus fuscus) have nationally important breeding populations. The storm–petrel breeds amongst the boulders of the more stable storm beaches. The largest population of Manx shearwater (Puffinus puffinus) in the islands breed here and the other annual breeding species are puffin (Fratercula arctica), greater black-backed gull (Larus marinus), razorbill (Alca torda), kittiwake (Rissa tridactyla), fulmar (Fulmarus glacialis), herring gull (L. argentatus) and shag (G. aristotelis). Common tern (Sterna hirundo) breed on the island most years as do cormorant (Phalacrocorax carbo) and very rarely Arctic tern (S. paradisaea).

==== Breeding birds ====
Annet has long had a reputation for being the best island for breeding birds and Jessie Mothersole visiting in 1910 described the island thus:

Annet is known by the name of "Bird Island" from the immense numbers that breed there. In the early summer the sea all round is black with puffins and razor-bills, their white breasts being hardly noticeable as they sit on the surface of the water; and the air above is dark with clouds of gulls, and full of their ceaseless cry. Puffins (also called sea-parrots) have bred on the islands from time immemorial.

Numbers of breeding birds have fallen over the years and in the last 150 years some of the threats have been recorded.

The Reverend Smart recorded his visit in 1885,

To land on Annet, when thousands of young birds are fledged and making their first essays at flight, is one of the best bits of fun imaginable, especially within a couple of hundred yards of the usual place of debarcation. The sandy, peat-coated soil is honeycombed by the birds. The young one has come out of the nest and with two or three steps you will get him. Do you though? In an instant one or both legs have suddenly sunk in the burrowed ground and birdie has escaped you. So the sport goes on, and it is a genuine romp for bird and follower. If you capture young ones you release them again. No gun has killed or lacerated; no stick has harmed; there is but a moment's scare for the palpitating, pecking fledgling, and he is off again, to join his parents, who hover near, and by their plaintive cries cheer up his beating heart and tell him they are at hand.

J. H. Gurney visited the island in May 1887 and estimated the population of Manx shearwater to be 200 pairs. He reported:

There had been a terrible robbery on Annet, a few days before our visit, of Shearwaters or their eggs, or both, and the south end of the island was dug over in all directions. Notwithstanding this, we had no difficulty in finding the objects of our search; indeed the ground was so honeycombed, that it was impossible in some places to avoid stepping on, and breaking into, their domiciles.

The raid on the colony had been carried out by men from Tresco and they were brought before the Lord Proprietor Thomas Smith-Dorrien-Smith; Gurney did not report on their punishment if any. He also reported that Annet was the only island without rats. A few weeks later cattle from the SS Castleford were landed on Annet after she hit the nearby Crebawethans and was said to have "trampled everything to pieces, broke in all the Shearwaters' holes, probably destroying many birds, and made a ruin of everything". Another wreck, the Thomas W Lawson on 14 December 1907, spilled her cargo of oil and many of the rabbits and birds on Annet "were seen to lie upon the shore". The smell of oil could still be smelt on nearby St Agnes 18 months later.

At the time of Jessie Mothersole's visit in 1910, visitors were only allowed one hour on the island and shooting and egg collecting was forbidden. Despite this, Annet figured highly on the list of places to visit for egg collecting. An examination of the egg collection at the Natural History Museum (NHM) shows forty-five eggs taken between 1880 and 1936 by fourteen individuals from Holloway College; doubtless there are many more eggs in private collections. Names on the data cards include well known wildlife experts such as Charles Rothschild and Frederick William Frohawk. An indication of how common and acceptable egg collecting was at the time, is the issue of day permits to visit uninhabited islands by the warden Arthur Dorrien-Smith of Tresco. A NHM data card for three eggs in the collection, has a permit for landing on Annet on 24 May 1931 attached, and allowed the Souter brothers to land on any island, except tern islands, for up to one hour.

European storm–petrel The only breeding sites for European storm-petrel in England are on the Isles of Scilly with 11 colonies and an estimated 1,475 occupied sites (i.e. breeding pairs). Annet had the majority of breeding pairs with 938 occupied sites during the Seabird 2000 survey declining to 788 occupied sites in a repeat survey in 2006.

Other species The most recent count of seabirds on the Isles of Scilly was the Seabird 2000 count and on Annet 209 nests were found to be occupied by shag out of a total of 1,109 for the islands. On Scilly, they breed almost exclusively beneath boulder beaches or holes in low cliffs. Manx shearwater was estimated to occupy 123 burrows out of a total of 201 for the islands’ – a 74% decrease from a previous survey in 1974.

On 22 September 2002 the first lanceolated warbler (Locustella lanceolata) recorded on the Isles of Scilly was found during a search for migrant birds. Also seen was two sedge warbler (Acrocephalus schoenobaenus) and four willow warbler (Phylloscopus trochilus).

==== Mammals ====
In 1996 the Isles of Scilly was designated a European Marine Site and the Marine Management Organisation is required to monitor the site at least every six years. The grey seal (Halichoerus grypus) is a named species and surveys were carried out in 2005 and 2010. Annet is one of the top four sites within the islands for numbers of seals and, during August to December 2010, over half of the observed pups seen were on Annet (46 out of 85). Records of some of the rarer cetaceans are from strandings and the British Museum was the first organisation to publish such reports for Britain. Strandings are often the only indication that rare species live, or pass through, an area and in 1917 an endangered species, a 13.6 m (44 ft 7 in) male fin whale (Balaenoptera physalus) was washed up.

Natural England (previously English Nature) began a rat extermination programme in the 1990s with systematic baiting now being carried out by the Wildlife Trust. Brown rats (Rattus norvegicus) were eradicated from Annet and a feasibility study found that the eradication of rats from St Agnes and Gugh would benefit the breeding birds on Annet by removing the most likely source of invasion. The study also found that small mammals also benefit from the eradication programme which should help the Annet population of Scilly shrew (Crocidura suaveolens). A rat eradication programme started on St Agnes and Gugh on 8 November 2013. This programme was successful, with St Agnes and Gugh being declared rat-free in early 2017.

Rabbit (Oryctolagus cuniculus) has also been recorded. A gull pellet found in 2002 contained the skull of a small mammal and when examined was found to be a water vole (Arvicola terrestris) which has never been found on the Isles of Scilly. Water vole is extinct at the nearest possible mainland source, Cornwall, and the original location of the skull is unknown.

==== Invertebrates ====
The lepidopterist Austin Richardson made annual visits to the Isles of Scilly from 1956 to 1962 recording the moths and butterflies. On 14 September 1958, during a visit to Annet, he saw a crimson speckled (Utetheisa pulchella); a migrant moth whose larvae have never been found in Britain. He did not see any larva of the grass eggar (Lasiocampa trifolii) but the imago was found there the following August. K Smith visited Annet in June 1961 to record the diptera and also found a moth, the garden tiger (Arctia caja).

Odonata

- Red-veined darter (Sympetrum fonscolombii) photographed on 23 September 2002

Dictyoptera

- Lesser cockroach (Ectobius panzeri) found at Smith's Carn on 20 June 2002 by Rosemary Parslow

Lepidoptera

- Aristotelia brizella larva (recorded in 1903)
- Lobesia littoralis (1934, 1994, 1995 and 1996)
- Grass eggar (Lasiocampa trifolii) (1959) and empty pupal cases, September 1993
- Crimson speckled (Utetheisa pulchella) (1958 and 1995)
- Garden tiger (Arctia caja) (1961)
- Knot grass larva (Acronicta rumicis) (2011)

Diptera

- Medetera saxatilis (recorded in 1961)
- Fucellia maritima (1961)
- Mydaea setifemur (1961)
- Minettia rivosa (1961)
- Sphaerophoria scripta (1961)
- Phryxe nemea (1961)
- Pherbellia cinerella (1961)
- Limonia unicolor (1961)

Hymenoptera

- Bombus lapidarius (recorded in 1961)
- B. terrestris (1961)
- B. hortorum (1961)
- B. muscorum (1961)

=== Flora ===
At the time of publication of Lousley's flora in 1971, 53 species of ferns, flowering plants and grasses had been recorded on Annet. They are as follows:-

- Bracken (Pteridium aquilinum)
- Sea spleenwort (Asplenium marinum)
- Lesser celandine (Ranunculus ficaria)
- Common scurvy-grass (Cochlearia officinalis)
- Danish scurvy-grass (C. danica)
- Common dog-violet (Viola riviniana)
- Pale wood-violet (V. reichenbachiana)
- Sea mouse-ear (Cerastium diffusum)
- Common chickweed (Stellaria media)
- Sea pearlwort (Sagina maritima)
- Cliff sea-spurry (Spergularia rupicola)
- Sea beet (Beta vulgaris subsp. maritima)
- Hastate orache (Atriplex prostrata)
- Babington's orache (A. glabriuscula)
- Frosted orache (A. laciniata)
- Prickly saltwort (Salsola kali)
- Tree mallow (Lavatera arborea)
- Dove's–foot crane's–bill (Geranium molle)
- Sea stork's–bill (Erodium maritimum)
- Common bird's–foot trefoil (Lotus corniculatus)
- Bird's–foot (Ornithopus perpusillus)
- Bramble (Rubus fruticosa)
- English stonecrop (Sedum anglicum)
- Navelwort (Umbilicus rupestris)
- Rock samphire (Crithmum maritimum)
- Sheep's sorrel (Rumex acetosella)
- Curled dock (R. crispus)
- Shore dock (R. rupestris) RDB, six plants found in 1994 and 51 in 1996.
- Nettle (Urtica dioica)
- Thrift (Armeria maritima)
- Early forgot-me-not (Myosotis ramosissima)
- Bittersweet (Solanum dulcamara)
- Black nightshade (Solanum nigrum)
- Buckshorn plantain (Plantago coronopus)
- Cleavers (Galium aparine)
- Ragwort (Senecio jacobaea)
- Heath groundsel (Senecio sylvaticus)
- Common groundsel (Senecio vulgaris)
- Sea mayweed (Tripleurospermum maritimum) including some plants with double flowers (fl. pleno)
- Slender thistle (Carduus tenuiflorus)
- Spear thistle (Cirsium vulgare)
- Prickly sow-thistle (Sonchus asper)
- Bluebell (Hyacinthoides non-scripta)
- Sand sedge (Carex arenaria)
- Heath-grass (Sieglingia decumbens)
- Red fescue (Festuca rubra)
- Darnel fescue (Catapodium marinum)
- Annual meadow-grass (Poa annua)
- Cocksfoot (Dactylis glomerata)
- Sand couch (Elytrigia juncea subsp. boreoatlantica)
- Yorkshire fog (Holcus lanatus)
- Creeping bent (Agrostis stolonifera)
