= Hollandia (1742 ship) =

Coordinates: 49.895°N 6.362°W

History

Dutch Republic
- Name: Hollandia
- Owner: Dutch East India Company
- Builder: Amsterdam Dockyard
- Launched: 1742
- Fate: Wrecked, 13 July 1743

General characteristics
- Type: Fluyt
- Tons burthen: 700 tons
- Length: 42 m (137 ft 10 in)
- Sail plan: Full-rigged ship
- Armament: 32 guns

Hollandia was a ship of the Dutch East India Company (Dutch: Vereenigde Oost-Indische Compagnie; VOC) which, on her maiden voyage, was wrecked on Gunner Rock, west of Annet, Isles of Scilly on 13 July 1743 causing 306 fatalities (276 sailors and soldiers and 30 passengers). The wreck was discovered in 1971 by Rex Cowan, a London attorney.

== History ==
Hollandia was built by the Dutch East India Company in 1742 in Amsterdam to a new design, as a 32-gun, 700-ton ship with a length of 42 metres (138 ft). On 3 July 1743 she left Texel as part of a Batavia bound fleet carrying a large amount of trade coin and several important passengers. On 13 July 1743 she became separated from the fleet and struck Gunner Rock near Annet, Isles of Scilly in the early hours of the morning, sinking nearby with the loss of all hands.

== Salvage ==
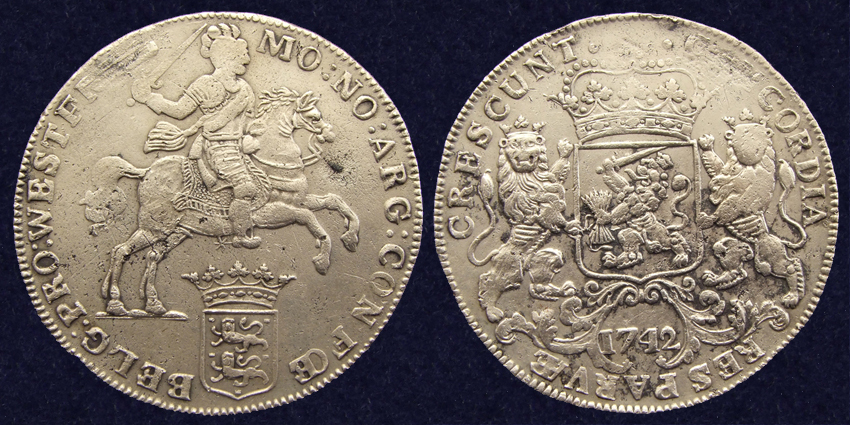
West-Friesland Rijder 1742 - recovered from the Hollandia shipwreck

Rex Cowan began his search for Hollandia in 1968, starting with Dutch and English archives and using advanced (for the time) equipment such as a proton magnetometer, finally locating the wreck on 16 September 1971. A large quantity of coins was recovered, as well as bronze cannons and mortars.
