= Fucellia costalis =

Scientific classification
- Kingdom: Animalia
- Phylum: Arthropoda
- Class: Insecta
- Order: Diptera
- Family: Anthomyiidae
- Subfamily: Anthomyiinae
- Tribe: Anthomyini
- Genus: Fucellia
- Species: F. costalis

Binomial name
- Fucellia costalis Stein, 1910

Species of fly

Fucellia costalis is a species of root-maggot fly in the family Anthomyiidae.
