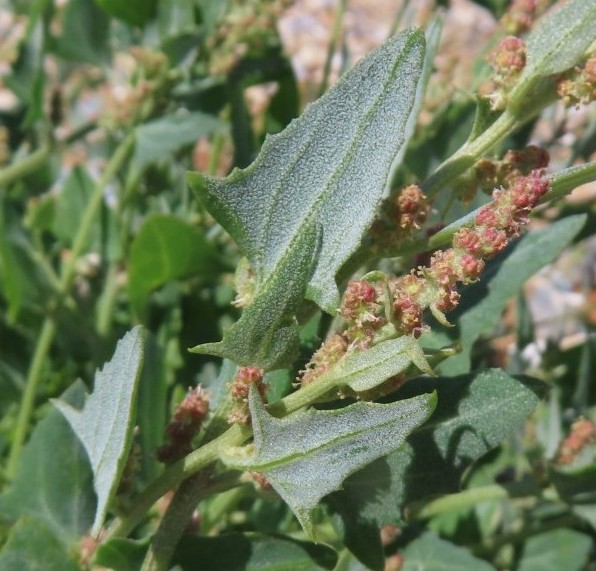

Scientific classification
- Kingdom: Plantae
- Clade: Embryophytes
- Clade: Tracheophytes
- Clade: Spermatophytes
- Clade: Angiosperms
- Clade: Eudicots
- Order: Caryophyllales
- Family: Amaranthaceae
- Genus: Atriplex
- Species: A. glabriuscula

Binomial name
- Atriplex glabriuscula Edmondston

= Atriplex glabriuscula =

Species of flowering plant

Atriplex glabriuscula, usually known in English as Babington's orache, is a prostrate to ascending plant that occurs on shingle beaches in NW Europe, and (as an introduction) in NE North America. It is a characteristic annual of strandline vegetation at the top of sand and shingle beaches.

== Description ==
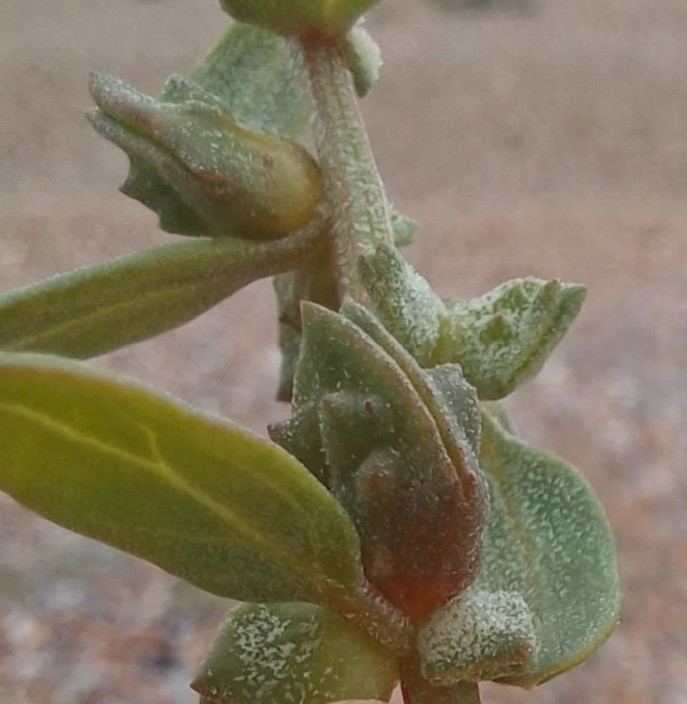
Unripe fruits of Babington's orache, showing the distinctive bracteoles

Babington's orache is a monoecious annual herb that is largely prostrate, with stems up to about 80 cm (2'6") long, although it often also produces at least one ascending or upright stem about 30 cm tall. It has a short taproot, some 5-10 cm long, and many fibrous lateral roots that spread out horizontally at a shallow depth. The tough, spirally grooved stems are green, striped with red, often branched, and entirely glabrous.

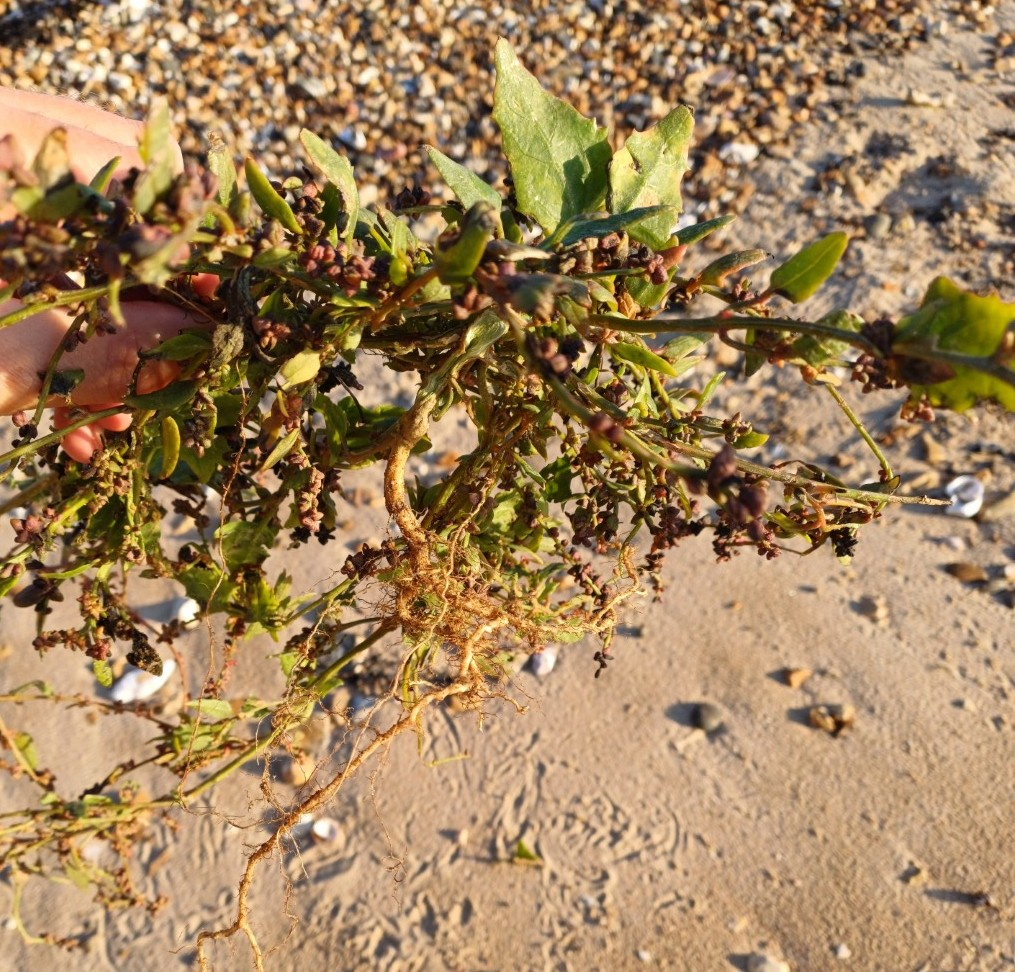
The roots spread out horizontally just above the saltwater boundary within the shingle.

The slightly succulent leaves alternate along the stem. The basal ones are triangular to hastate (spear-shaped), about 4-10 cm long, often with forward-pointing basal lobes, and sometimes with several teeth or shallow lobes around the margin. The uppermost leaves may be reduced to sessile, narrow ovals. The lower leaves have a petiole about 1 cm long, but no stipules. They are typically green, sometimes flushed red, and usually rather mealy when young.

Flowering occurs in late summer. The inflorescence is a panicle of short spikes made up of dense glomerules, or clusters, of 4-6 tiny, petal-less sessile flowers. The flowers are unisexual, with the male ones being about 1-2 mm across, with 4 or 5 tiny tepals and 4 or 5 stamens. The females consist of an ovary with a short style and two stigmas, situated between two broadly rhombic (kite-shaped) bracteoles that generally enlarge at maturity to about 12 mm, but can be as small as 4 mm long. The bracteoles are green or red and are often studded with wart-like projections and are fused from the base to the halfway point.

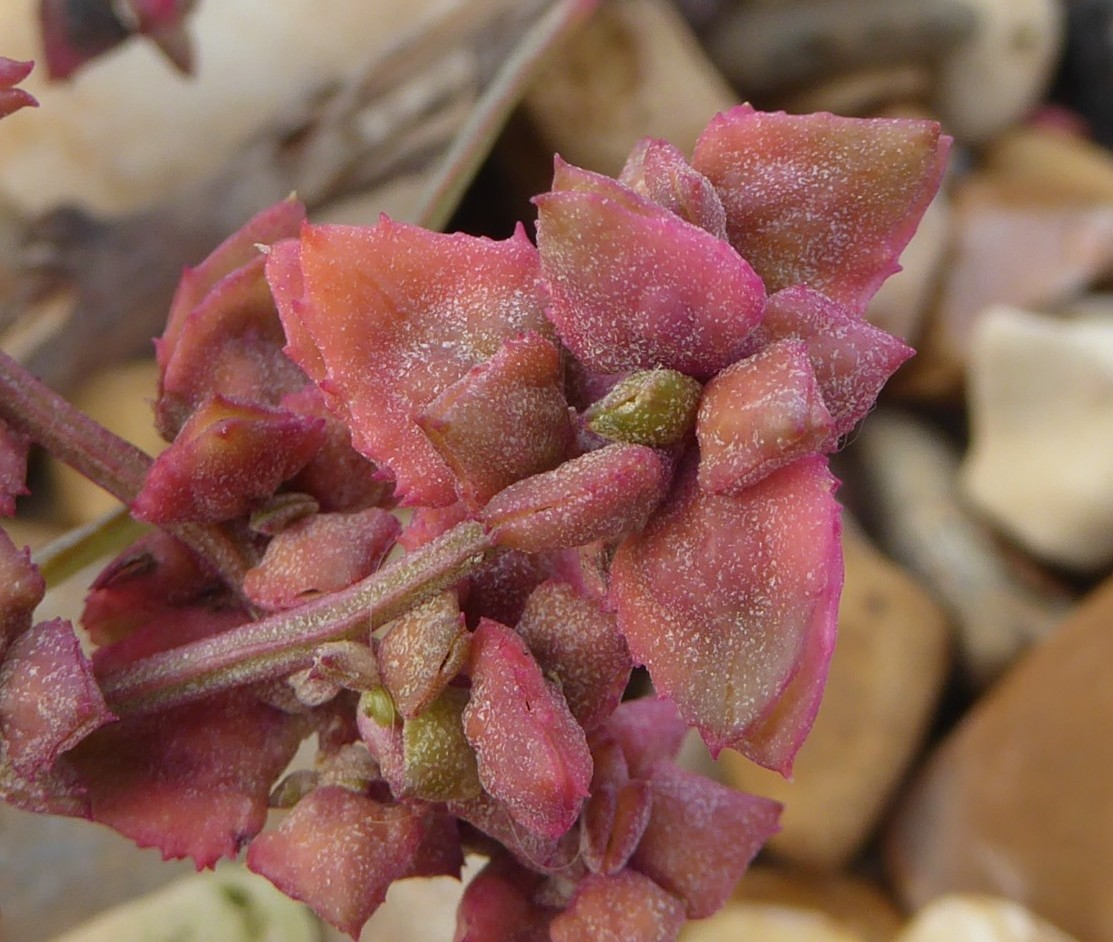
Fruits

The fruit ripens to a brown or black round seed (achene) 4 mm in diameter and slightly flattened into a disc shape. The radicle (incipient root) arises on the side and points upwards within the bracteoles.

== Taxonomy ==
The identification of some Atriplex species is very difficult. In the 19th century there were several competing views about how many species could be recognised: Charles Cardale Babington, who was a notorious splitter, thought in 1841 that there were as many as nine species in sect. Teutliopsis (which includes spear-leaved and Babington's), whereas George Bentham recognised only one. In 1851, a clear description of Babington's orache was included in the third edition of Babington's Manual of British Botany as Atriplex Babingtonii Woods, hence the common name "Babington's" orache. However, a reasonable description, under the name A. glabriuscula had already been given by the young botanist Thomas Edmondston in his Flora of Shetland in 1845, so that name takes preference.

The genus name Atriplex is derived from ἀδράφαξυς (adráphaxus), which was a name used by Pliny. Dioscorides, in De materia medica also mentions an Atraphaxis as a well-known vegetable, which may have been garden orache. The specific epithet glabriuscula is from the Latin word glaber, and means almost ("a little bit") smooth or hairless. This gives rise to a common name that is frequently used in America, smooth orache. Other common names it has been given include Scotland orache and seaside orach.

Its chromosome number is 2n = 18.

Babington's orache is highly variable, morphologically, and several subspecies have been described, but only three are recognised at present. The American plants are considered to be genetically distinct and are named A. glabriuscula var. acadiensis (Tascher.) S.L. Welsh and var. franktonii (Tascher.) S.L. Welsh, whereas the European plants are all (by default) var. glabriuscula. Small-fruited plants have been named var. babingtonii (Woods) Moss & Wilmott, but this taxon is not widely accepted.

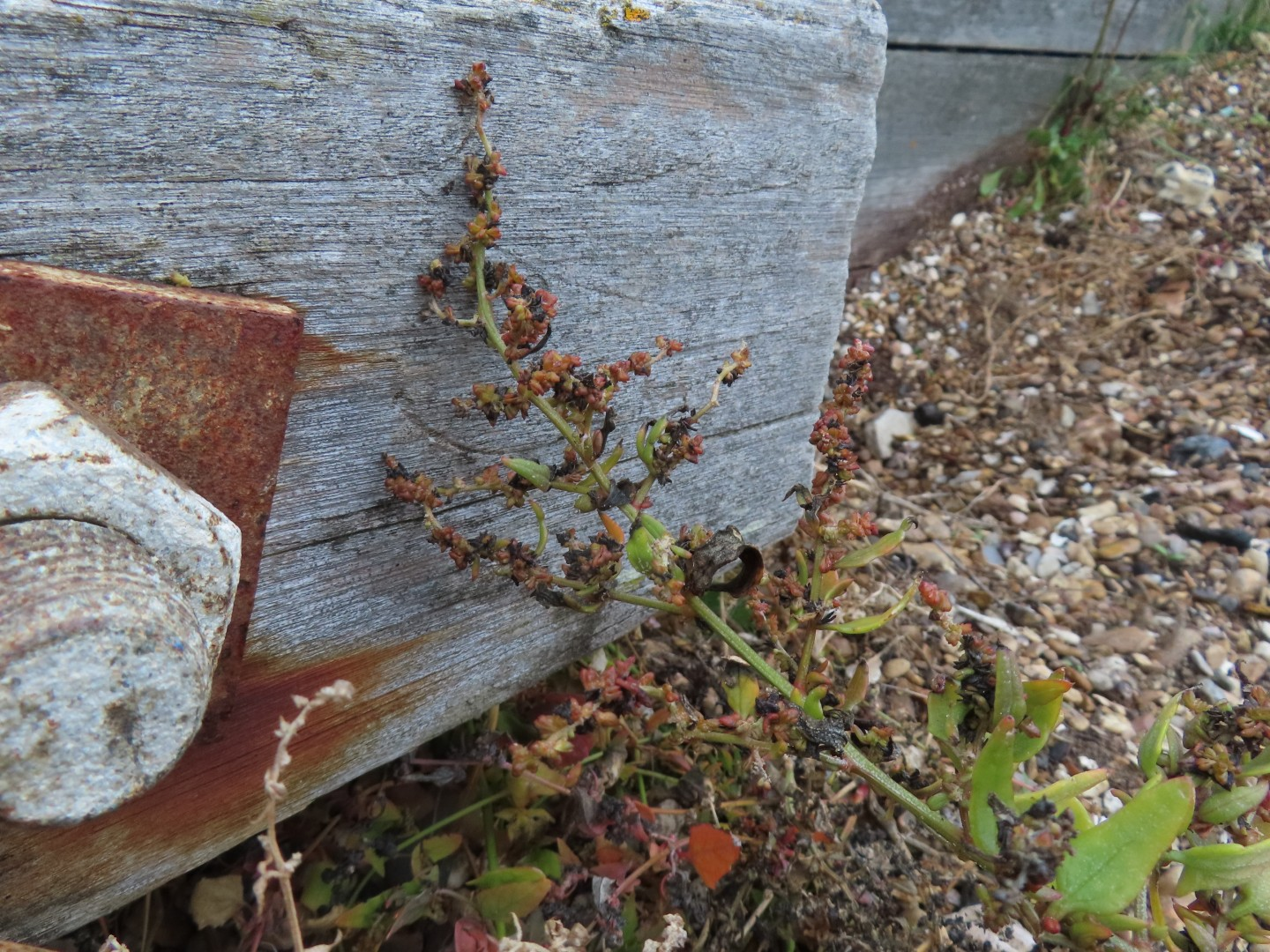
Atriplex prostrata x glabriuscula has crowded seedheads with a high proportion of barren fruits

It hybridises freely with several other species in the genus, and (partly because the chromosome numbers are all 2n = 18) the hybrids can be fertile, and are found in the absence of one or both parents:

- Atriplex prostrata x glabriuscula is only partly fertile and can be found on beaches in Europe and North America where the parents meet. It is recognised by the intermediate bracteoles and the crowded seedhead with abortive fruits.
- A. glabriuscula x Atriplex praecox is a much rarer hybrid which is found on beaches in Scotland, Shetland and Scandinavia.
- A. glabriuscula x Atriplex longipes (A. ^{x}taschereaui) has recently been shown to be very widespread around the coast of Britain, even in the absence of the latter parent. Taschereau's orache is similar to Babington's except for the large (15-20 mm) bracteoles which can be on pedicels up to about 10 mm long.

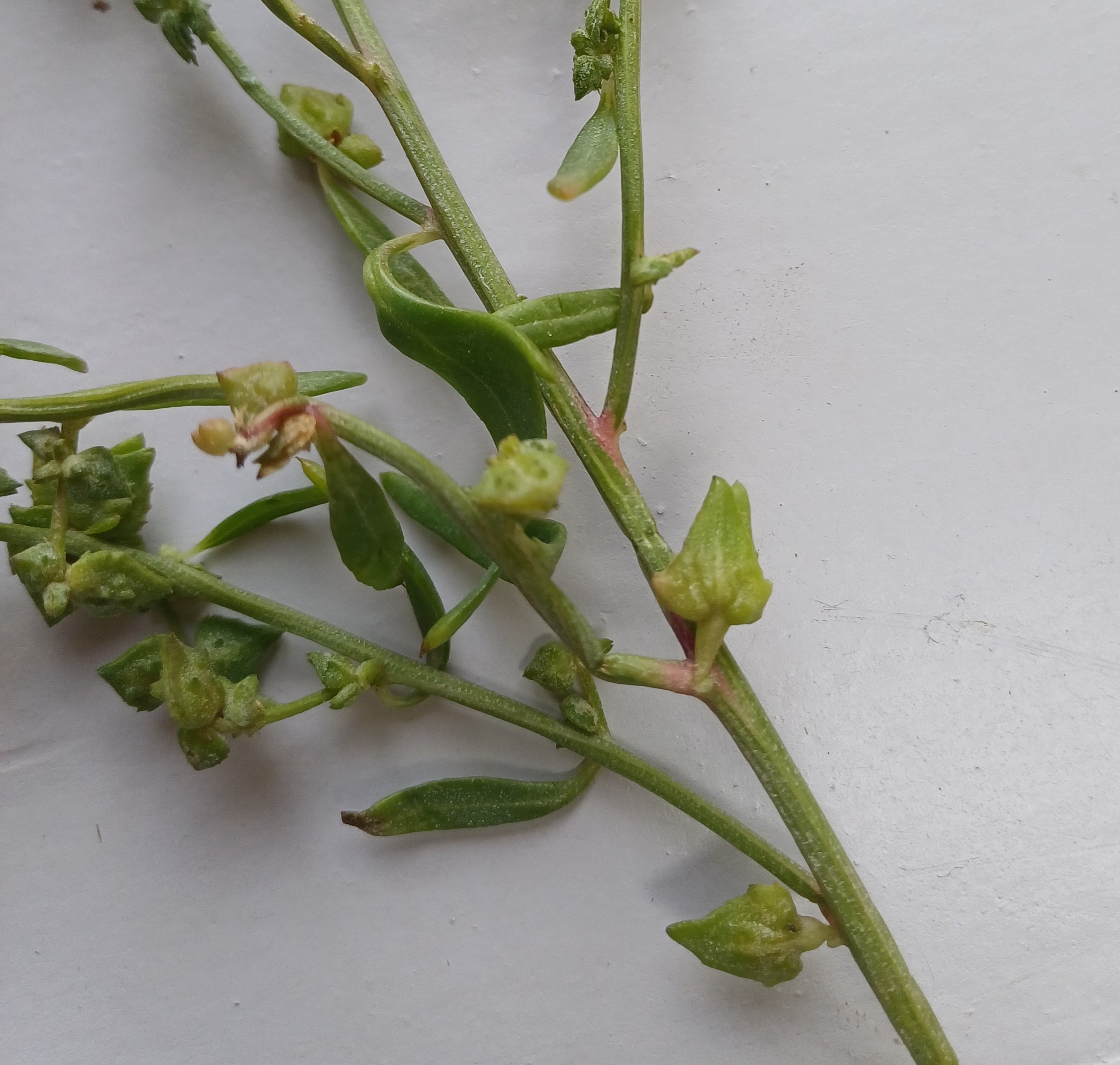
Taschereau's orache has elongated bracteoles and fruits on short stalks

== Distribution and status ==
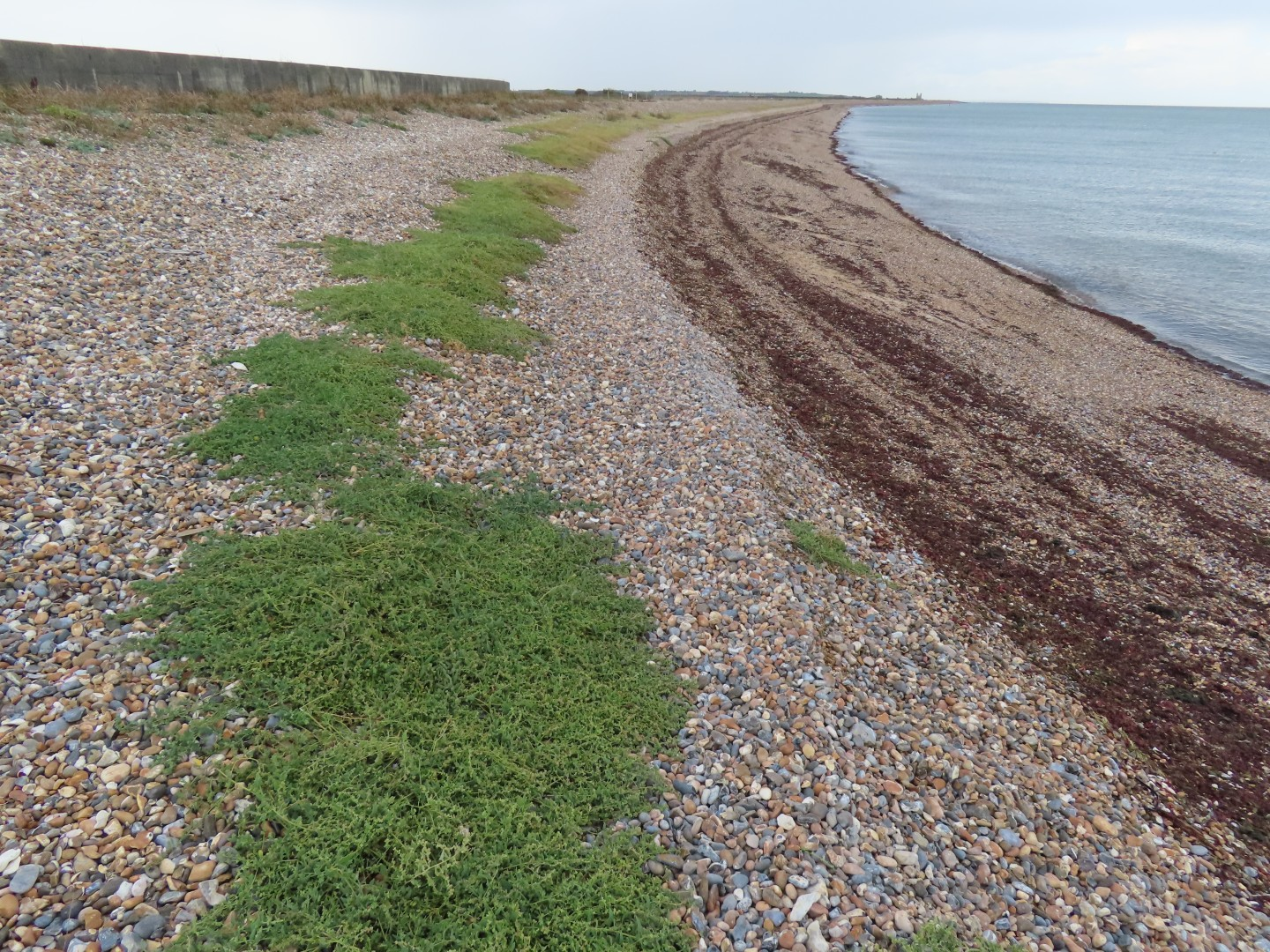
Atriplex glabriuscula and A. x taschereaui on the tideline at Reculver, Kent

Babington's orache is native only along the Atlantic shores of northern Europe (including Iceland), where it is frequent from Brittany to Finland, with the largest populations around Scotland and Denmark. In America it is an introduction on the beaches of Nova Scotia and New Brunswick, with some outlying populations in Hudson Bay.

It is present around the entire coastline of Britain and Ireland, including Shetland and Orkney, and the Channel Isles, and has seemingly been increasing in recent decades, especially around Ireland. There is little evidence of it spreading successfully onto salt-treated inland roadsides, although many other coastal species do so.

Although it has not been assessed for threat status globally, in Britain and France, where it is quite abundant, it is classified as LC (Least Concern) and it is not considered to be at any risk of extinction.

In Britain and Ireland it is considered an axiophyte in all counties with a coastline. This means it should be taken into account in designating sites for conservation, such as nature reserves, and can be used in monitoring.

== Habitat and ecology ==
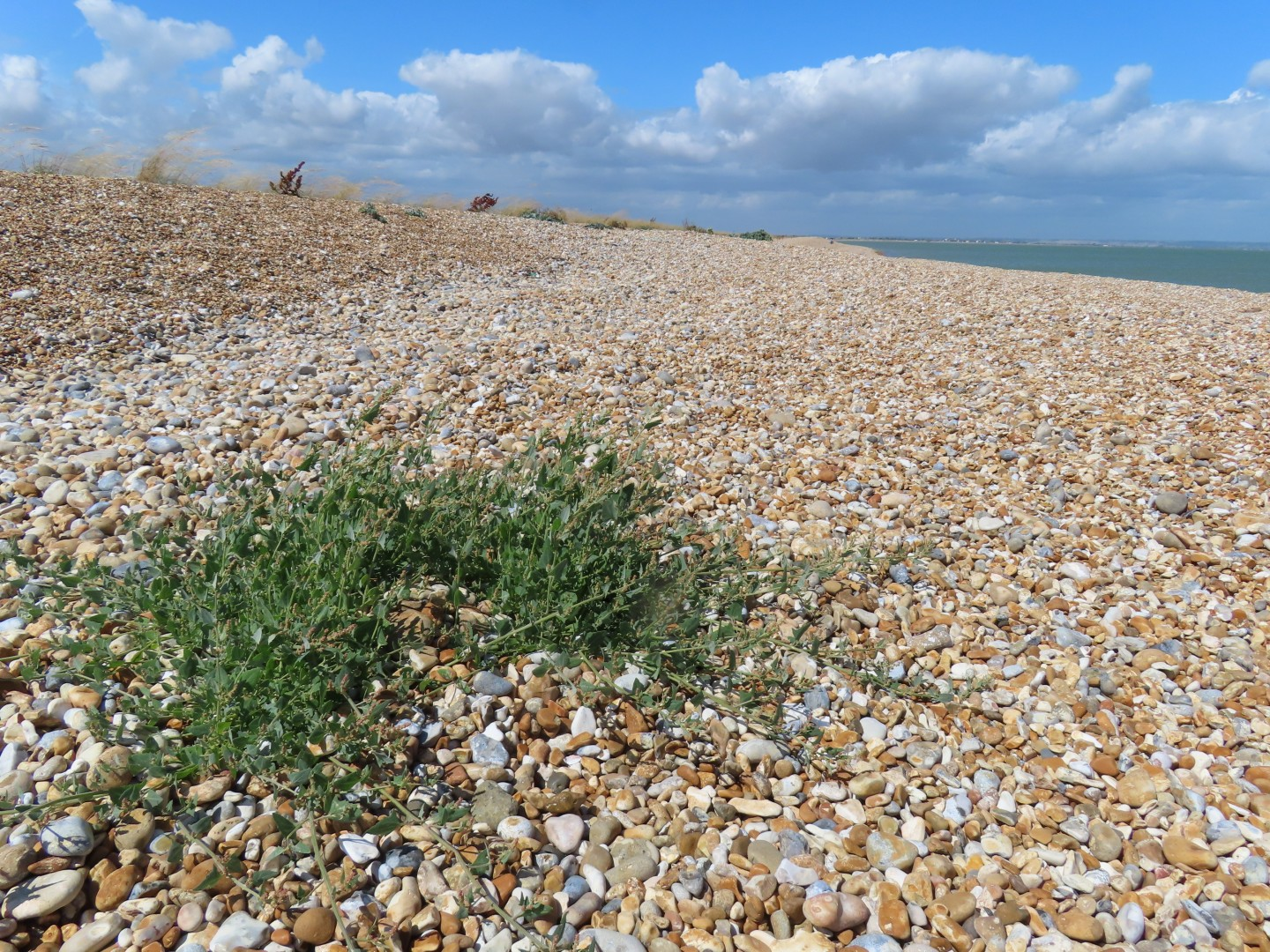
Babington's orache grows at the tidal limit on shingle beaches

The habitat of this species is on shingle or sand-and-shingle beaches, generally between the mean spring high tide line and the equinoctial high tide line. Each year this strandline vegetation, which is classified as habitat 1210 in the EUNIS habitat classification system, is destroyed by exceptional tides with a coefficient of 100–120. In England, this is usually SD1 Rumex crispus-Glaucium flavum vegetation, whereas in Scotland it is more likely to be SD3 Matricaria maritima - Galium aparine strandline community. In some places it is practically the only species that grows close to the tidal limit, but in others it is interspersed with other shingle plants such as sea kale and other species of orache.

It is adapted to complete its life cycle during the summer months and to tolerate salty water at a shallow depth. Some accounts used to suggest that the fertility of shingle beaches is particularly high, due to rotting seaweed mixed into the shingle, but more recent studies show that while this might be true in some circumstances, a beach is usually very nutrient poor.

It has been assigned Ellenberg-type indicator values of L = 9, F = 6, R = 7, N = 8, S = 4 and T = 5, which reflect the understanding that it grows in full sunlight in places with moderate freshwater availability, neutral pH, high fertility, high salinity and low temperatures.

It is primarily wind-pollinated but can be self-pollinating.

There are five parasitic species known to live on Babington's orache in Europe:

- Coleophora saxicolella is a moth whose larvae feed on the fruits
- Hayhurstia atriplicis aphids produce galls in the leaves
- Pegomya hyoscyami larvae mine the leaves
- Peronospora minor is a downy mildew that infests the leaves
- Scrobipalpa obsoletella is a moth whose larvae produce galls in the stems.

None of these is specific to (i.e. monophagous on) Babington's orache.

== Uses ==
All Oraches are edible, and some people do collect the young leaves of Babington's orache for cooking. Livestock will also graze on oraches, for example in machair grassland.
