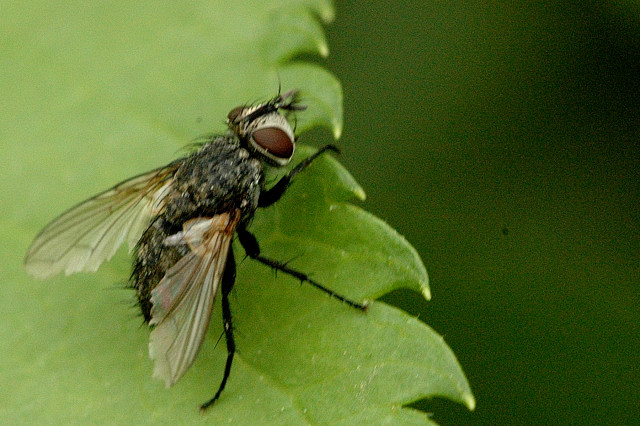
- Phryxe vulgaris

Scientific classification
- Kingdom: Animalia
- Phylum: Arthropoda
- Clade: Pancrustacea
- Class: Insecta
- Order: Diptera
- Family: Tachinidae
- Subfamily: Exoristinae
- Tribe: Eryciini
- Genus: Phryxe; Robineau-Desvoidy, 1830

Type species
- Phryxe athaliae(=Tachina vulgaris Fallén, 1810) Robineau-Desvoidy, 1830

Synonyms
- Anoxycampta Bigot, 1880; Blepharidea Rondani, 1856; Blepharidopsis Brauer & von Berganstamm, 1891; Blepharidopsis Brauer, 1893; Blumia Robineau-Desvoidy, 1863; Catachaeta Brauer & von Berganstamm, 1891; Ceratochaeta Brauer & von Berganstamm, 1889; Erinia Robineau-Desvoidy, 1863; Eurigastrina Lioy, 1864; Frixe Rondani, 1873; Hemithaea Robineau-Desvoidy, 1863; Pholoe Robineau-Desvoidy, 1863; Phrixe Rondani, 1862; Plagiophryxe Townsend, 1926

= Phryxe =

Genus of flies

Phryxe is a genus of flies in the family Tachinidae.

== Species ==
- Phryxe caudata (Rondani, 1859)
- Phryxe erythrostoma (Hartig, 1838)
- Phryxe heraclei (Meigen, 1824)
- Phryxe hirta (Bigot, 1880)
- Phryxe magnicornis (Zetterstedt, 1838)
- Phryxe nemea (Meigen, 1824)
- Phryxe patruelis Mesnil, 1953
- Phryxe pecosensis (Townsend, 1926)
- Phryxe prima (Brauer & von Berganstamm, 1889)
- Phryxe semicaudata Herting, 1959
- Phryxe setifacies (Villeneuve, 1910)
- Phryxe tenebrata Herting, 1977
- Phryxe tolucana Reinhard, 1956
- Phryxe unicolor (Villeneuve, 1908)
- Phryxe vulgaris (Fallén, 1810)
