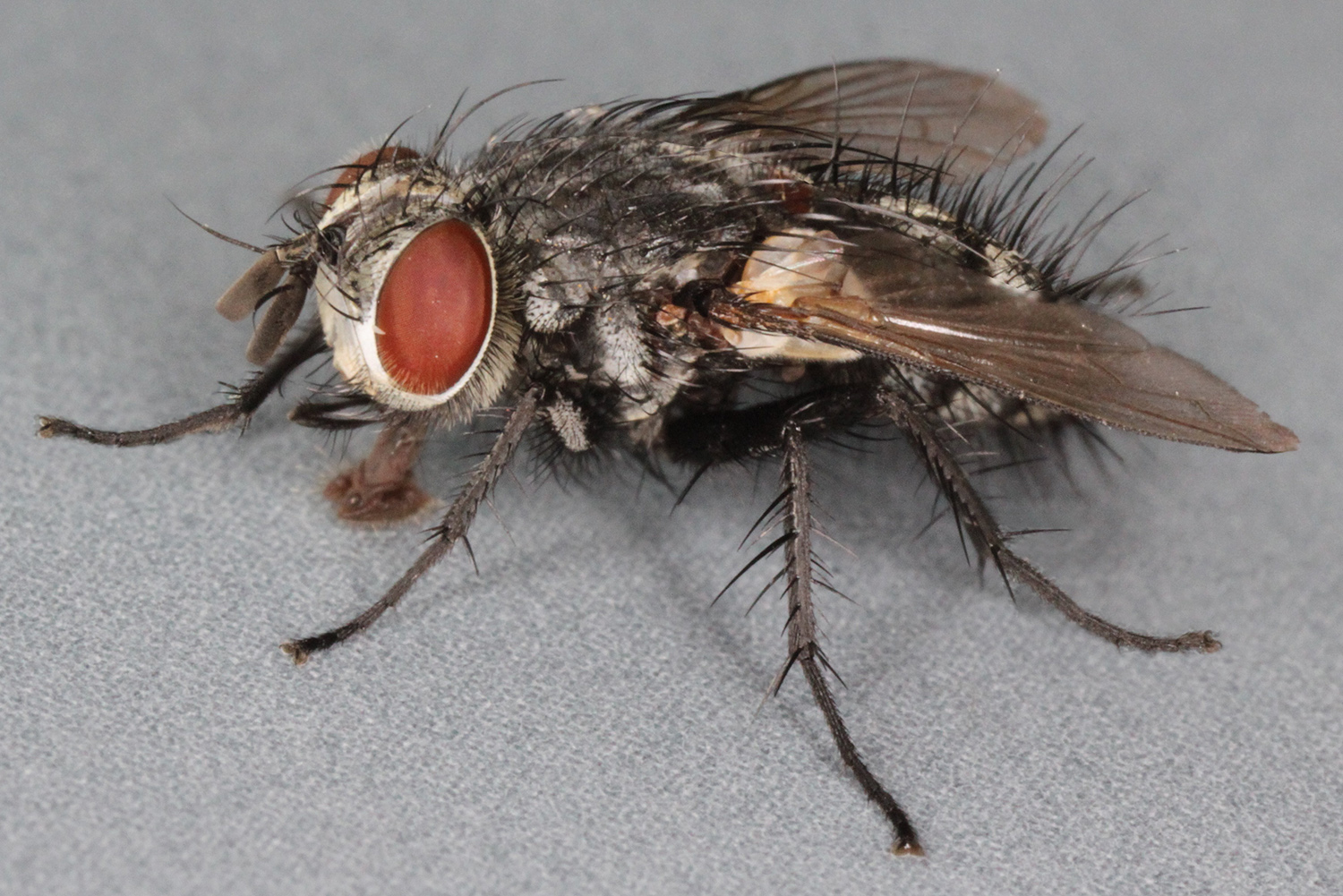
- Phryxe vulgaris North Wales

Scientific classification
- Kingdom: Animalia
- Phylum: Arthropoda
- Class: Insecta
- Order: Diptera
- Family: Tachinidae
- Subfamily: Exoristinae
- Tribe: Eryciini
- Genus: Phryxe
- Species: P. vulgaris

Binomial name
- Phryxe vulgaris (Fallén, 1810)

Synonyms
- Exorista audax Macquart, 1850; Exorista brevis Macquart, 1850; Exorista cita Macquart, 1850; Exorista crassistylum Macquart, 1850; Exorista diffusa Macquart, 1850; Exorista elliptica Macquart, 1850; Exorista florida Macquart, 1850; Exorista griseifrons Macquart, 1850; Exorista habilis Macquart, 1850; Exorista inclinata Macquart, 1850; Exorista insinuans Macquart, 1850; Exorista prominens Meigen, 1838; Exorista singularis Macquart, 1850; Exorista vivida Macquart, 1850; Lydella scutellaris Robineau-Desvoidy, 1830; Phryxe appellata Robineau-Desvoidy, 1863; Phryxe athaliae Robineau-Desvoidy, 1830; Phryxe cauta Robineau-Desvoidy, 1863; Phryxe ciliata Robineau-Desvoidy, 1830; Phryxe cinerea Robineau-Desvoidy, 1863; Phryxe cita Robineau-Desvoidy, 1863; Phryxe cognata Robineau-Desvoidy, 1863; Phryxe compos Robineau-Desvoidy, 1863; Phryxe conducta Robineau-Desvoidy, 1863; Phryxe consentanea Robineau-Desvoidy, 1863; Phryxe depressa Robineau-Desvoidy, 1830; Phryxe fugitiva Robineau-Desvoidy, 1863; Phryxe grata Robineau-Desvoidy, 1863; Phryxe innoxia Robineau-Desvoidy, 1863; Phryxe integra Robineau-Desvoidy, 1863; Phryxe judicata Robineau-Desvoidy, 1863; Phryxe jussa Robineau-Desvoidy, 1863; Phryxe lavata Robineau-Desvoidy, 1863; Phryxe lusoria Robineau-Desvoidy, 1863; Phryxe miniata Robineau-Desvoidy, 1863; Phryxe misera Robineau-Desvoidy, 1863; Phryxe morosa Robineau-Desvoidy, 1863; Phryxe muscidea Robineau-Desvoidy, 1863; Phryxe neglecta Robineau-Desvoidy, 1863; Phryxe obsequens Robineau-Desvoidy, 1863; Phryxe obtenta Robineau-Desvoidy, 1863; Phryxe pieridis Robineau-Desvoidy, 1850; Phryxe praefixa Robineau-Desvoidy, 1863; Phryxe provida Robineau-Desvoidy, 1863; Phryxe proxima Robineau-Desvoidy, 1863; Phryxe quadriguttata Robineau-Desvoidy, 1863; Phryxe rubrella Robineau-Desvoidy, 1863; Phryxe serena Robineau-Desvoidy, 1863; Phryxe serva Robineau-Desvoidy, 1863; Phryxe sororella Robineau-Desvoidy, 1863; Phryxe stimulata Robineau-Desvoidy, 1863; Phryxe subrotundata Robineau-Desvoidy, 1830; Phryxe timida Robineau-Desvoidy, 1863; Phryxe tranquilla Robineau-Desvoidy, 1863; Phryxe tristis Robineau-Desvoidy, 1863; Phryxe vafra Robineau-Desvoidy, 1863; Phryxe valida Robineau-Desvoidy, 1863; Phryxe vanessae Robineau-Desvoidy, 1850; Phryxe vernalis Robineau-Desvoidy, 1863; Phryxe vesana Robineau-Desvoidy, 1863; Phryxe volatilis Robineau-Desvoidy, 1863; Pseudophorocera setigera Brauer & von Berganstamm, 1889; Tachina aratoria Meigen, 1824; Tachina collecta Walker, 1853; Tachina constans Walker, 1853; Tachina distermina Walker, 1853; Tachina familiaris Meigen, 1824; Tachina hirsuta Osten Sacken, 1887; Tachina mobilis Zetterstedt, 1844; Tachina neglecta Walker, 1853; Tachina praetervisa Zetterstedt, 1844; Tachina rotundaticornis Zetterstedt, 1844; Tachina temera Meigen, 1824; Tachina tyche Walker, 1849; Tachina vulgaris Fallén, 1810

= Phryxe vulgaris =

Species of fly

Phryxe vulgaris is a species of fly in the family Tachinidae.

== Distribution ==
Canada, United States, Turkmenistan, Uzbekistan, China, British Isles, Czech Republic, Estonia, Hungary, Latvia, Lithuania, Moldova, Poland, Romania, Slovakia, Ukraine, Denmark, Finland, Norway, Sweden, Albania, Andorra, Bosnia and Herzegovina, Bulgaria, Croatia, Greece, Italy, Malta, Portugal, Serbia, Slovenia, Spain, Turkey, Austria, Belgium, France, Germany, Netherlands, Switzerland, Japan, Iran, Israel, Mongolia, Russia, India.
