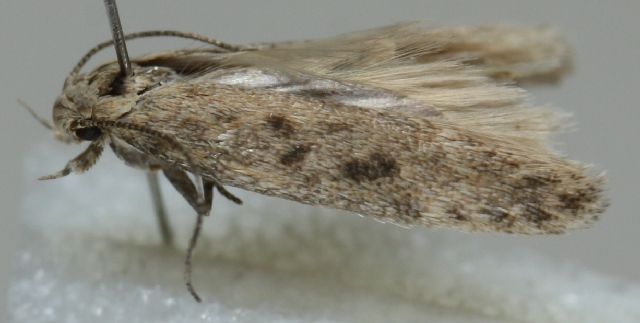

Scientific classification
- Domain: Eukaryota
- Kingdom: Animalia
- Phylum: Arthropoda
- Class: Insecta
- Order: Lepidoptera
- Family: Gelechiidae
- Genus: Scrobipalpa
- Species: S. obsoletella

Binomial name
- Scrobipalpa obsoletella (Fischer von Röslerstamm, 1841)

Synonyms
- Lita obsoletella Fischer v. Röslerstamm, 1841; Gnorimoschema obsoletellum; Gnorimoschema miscitatella Clarke, 1932; Phthorimaea bipunctella Hartig, 1941; Phthorimaea calaritanella Amsel, 1952; Scrobipalpa obsoletella hospes Povolný, 1964

= Scrobipalpa obsoletella =

Species of moth

Scrobipalpa obsoletella, the summer groundling, is a moth of the family Gelechiidae. It is found in most of Europe, Turkey, the Caucasus, from Iran to Asian Russia (Transbaikal) and Mongolia. It has also been recorded from New Zealand, South Africa and North America, where it is probably an introduced species. The habitat consists of coastal salt marshes and sandy beaches.

The wingspan is 12–14 mm (0.47–0.55 in). Terminal joint of palpi as long as second. Forewings pale greyish-ochreous, sprinkled with dark fuscous and ochreous-whitish; stigmata dark fuscous, first discal rather beyond plical; a dark fuscous spot close beyond and slightly beneath second discal, sometimes confluent with it; an indistinct fine pale angulated fascia at 3/4, sometimes obsolete. Hindwings 1, whitish-grey, terminally darker. The larva is pale yellowish-green; dorsal line reddish; sides sometimes rosy-tinged; dots blackish-grey; head pale brownish-ochreous; plate of 2 blackish-brown.

Adults have been recorded on wing from May to August.

The larvae feed on Atriplex glabriuscula, Atriplex halimus, Atriplex litoralis, Atriplex tatarica and Chenopodium species. The larvae can be found from June to July and again in September.
