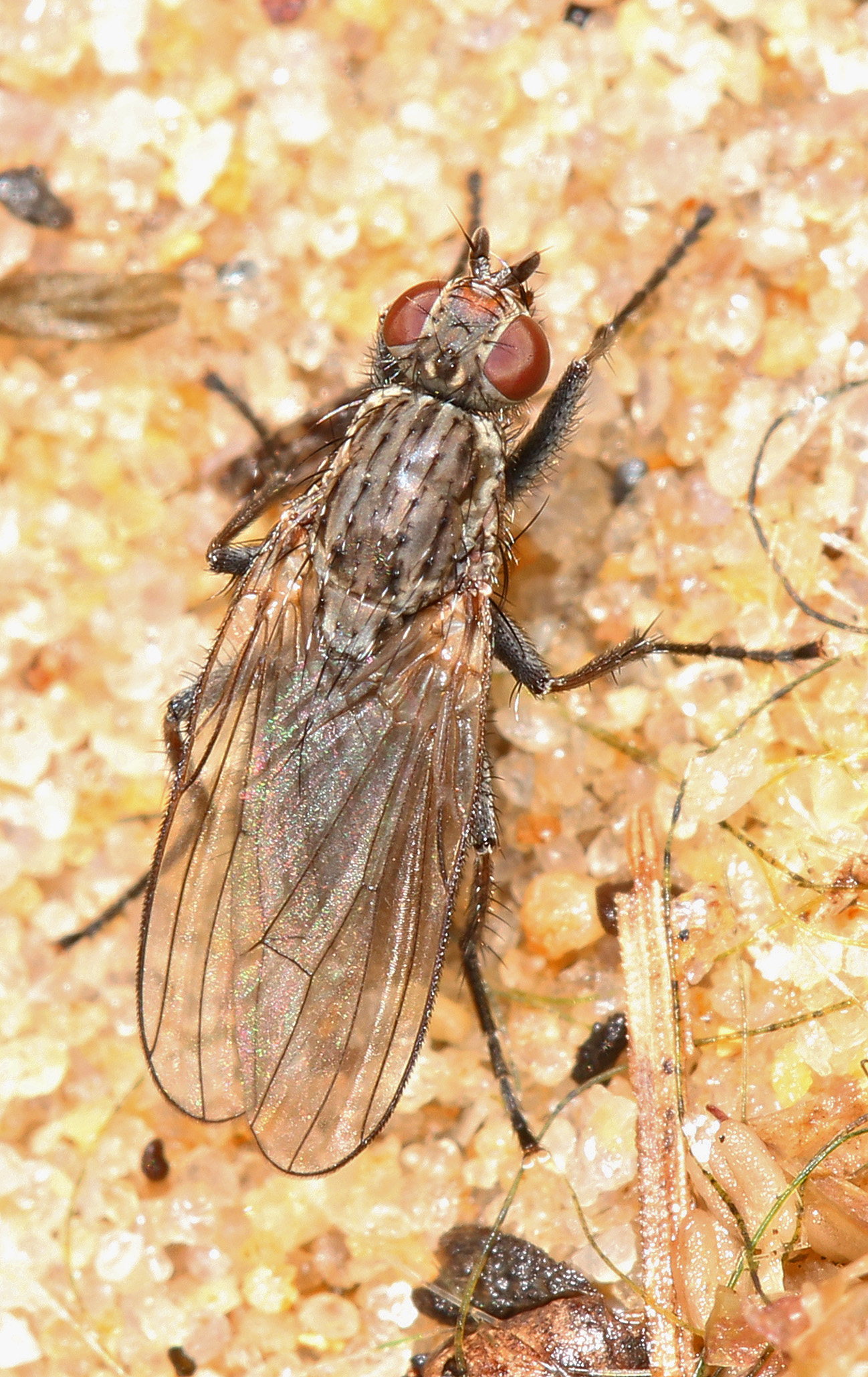

Scientific classification
- Domain: Eukaryota
- Kingdom: Animalia
- Phylum: Arthropoda
- Class: Insecta
- Order: Diptera
- Family: Anthomyiidae
- Subfamily: Anthomyiinae
- Tribe: Anthomyini
- Genus: Fucellia; Robineau-Desvoidy, 1842

= Fucellia =

Genus of flies

Fucellia is a genus of seaweed flies in the family Anthomyiidae. There are at least 20 described species in the genus Fucellia.

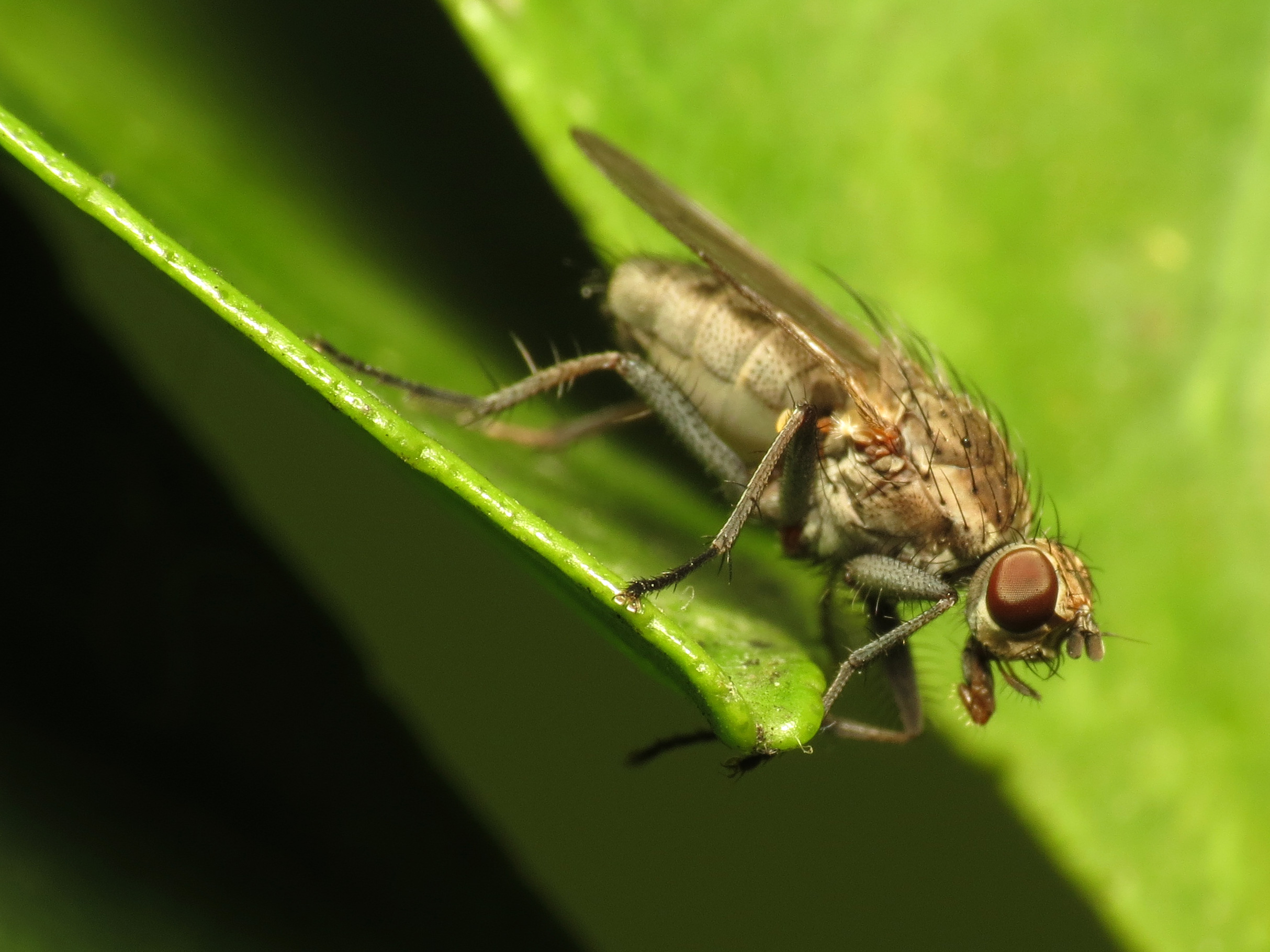
Seaweed flies, Fucellia

== Species ==
These 28 species belong to the genus Fucellia:

- F. aestuum Aldrich, 1918^{i c g}
- F. albeola Huckett, 1927^{i c g}
- F. antennata Stein, 1910^{i c g}
- F. apicalis Kertész, 1908^{c g}
- F. ariciiformis (Holmgren, 1872)^{i c g}
- F. assimilis Malloch, 1918^{i c g}
- F. biseriata Huckett, 1966^{i c g}
- F. boninensis Snyder, 1965^{c g}
- F. calcoerata (Macquart, 1851)^{c g}
- F. capensis (Schiner, 1868)^{c g}
- F. chinensis Kertész, 1908^{i c g b}
- F. costalis Stein, 1910^{i c g b}
- F. fucorum (Fallén, 1819)^{i c g}
- F. griseola (Fallén, 1819)^{c g}
- F. hypopygialis Ringdahl, 1930^{c g}
- F. intermedia (Zetterstedt, 1845)^{c g}
- F. kamtchatica Ringdahl, 1930^{i c g}
- Fucellia maritima (Haliday, 1838)
- F. pictipennis Becker, 1907^{i c g}
- F. pluralis Huckett, 1965^{i c g}
- F. rejecta Aldrich, 1918^{i c g}
- F. rufitibia Stein, 1910^{i c g}
- F. separata Stein, 1910^{i c g}
- F. signata (Zetterstedt, 1845)^{c g}
- F. syuitimorii (Séguy, 1936)^{c g}
- F. tergina (Zetterstedt, 1845)^{i c g}
- F. thinobia (Thomson, 1869)^{i c g}
- F. vibei Collin, 1951^{i c g}

Data sources: i = ITIS, c = Catalogue of Life, g = GBIF, b = Bugguide.net
