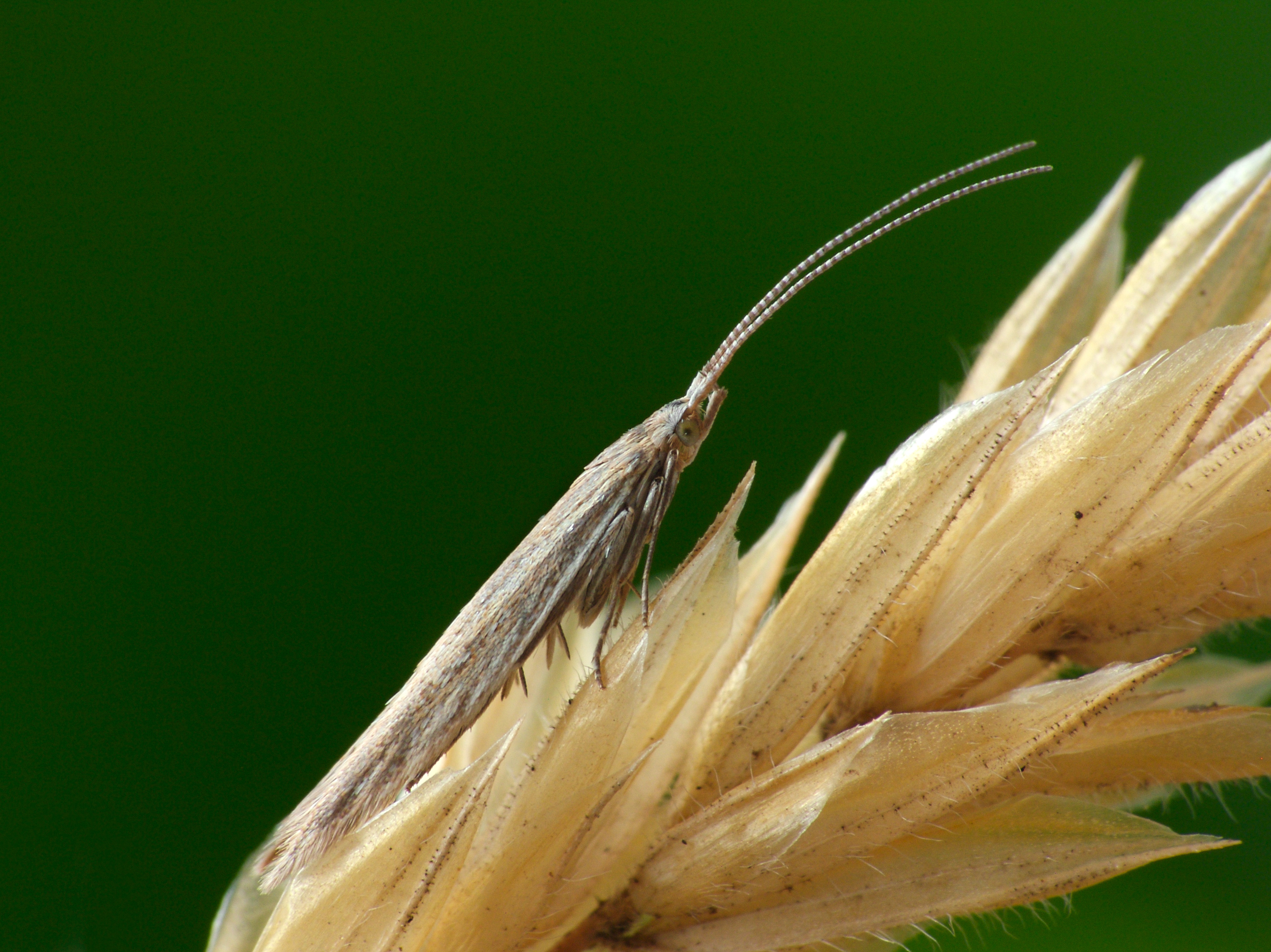
- Coleophora saxicolella male Worcestershire, England
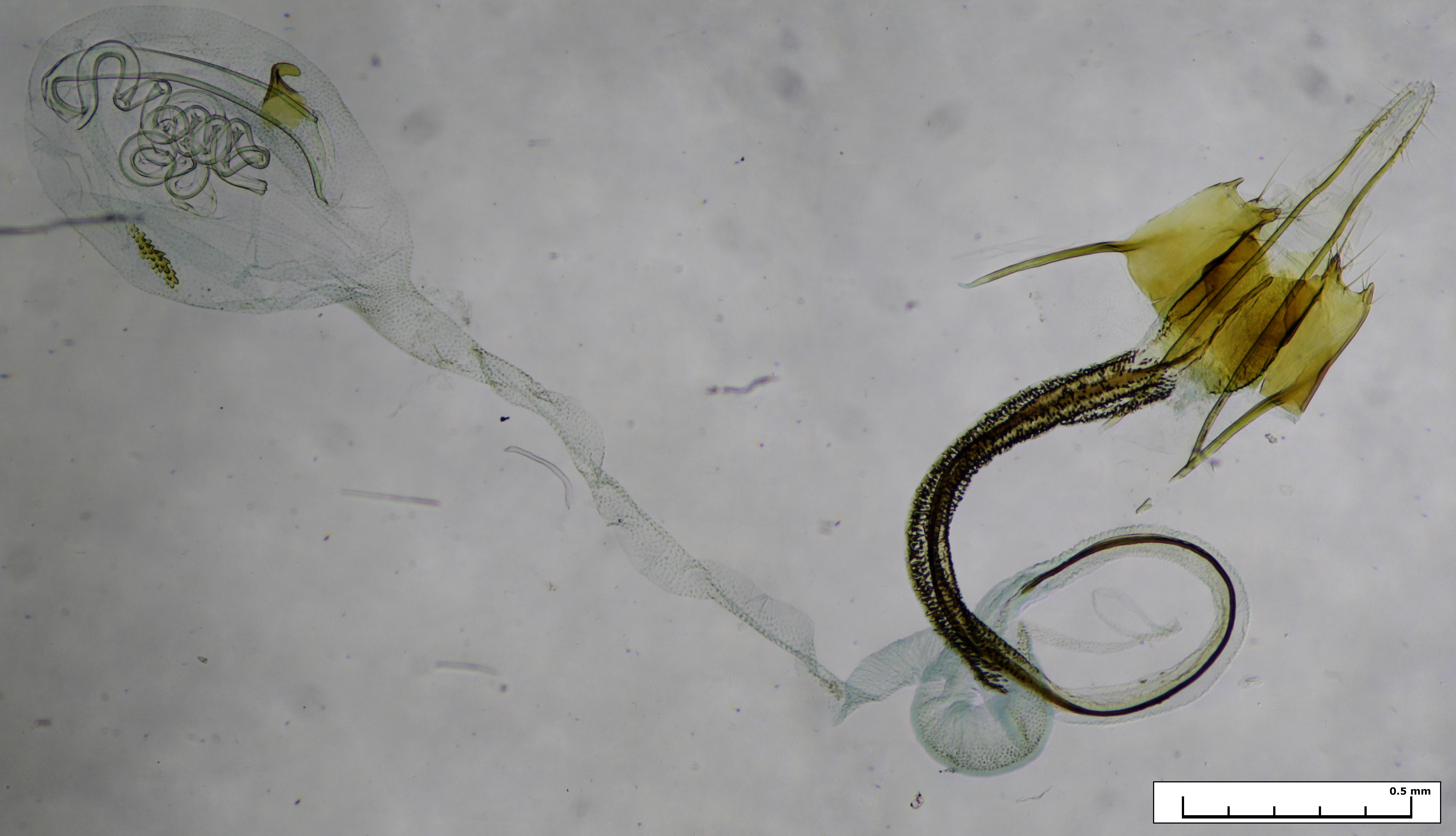
- Genitalia preparation

Scientific classification
- Kingdom: Animalia
- Phylum: Arthropoda
- Class: Insecta
- Order: Lepidoptera
- Family: Coleophoridae
- Genus: Coleophora
- Species: C. saxicolella

Binomial name
- Coleophora saxicolella Duponchel, 1843

Synonyms
- Ecebalia saxicolella; Coleophora benanderi Kanerva, 1941; Aureliania bucovinensis Nemes, 2004

= Coleophora saxicolella =

Species of moth

Coleophora saxicolella is a moth of the family Coleophoridae found in Asia and Europe.

== Description ==
The wingspan is 13–16 mm. Adults are on wing in July and August. Coleophora species have narrow blunt to pointed forewings and a weakly defined tornus. The hindwings are narrow-elongate and very long-fringed. The upper surfaces have neither a discal spot nor transverse lines. Each abdomen segment of the abdomen has paired patches of tiny spines which show through the scales. The resting position is horizontal with the front end raised and the cilia give the hind tip a frayed and upturned look if the wings are rolled around the body. C. saxicolella characteristics include forewing obscurely streaked, with pale costa. Streaks overlaid with scattered fuscous scales. Only reliably identified by dissection and microscopic examination of the genitalia.

The larvae feed on Chenopodium and Atriplex species. They feed on the generative organs of their host plant and make a silken case of 6–7 mm. Pupation occurs in the case on the ground.

== Distribution ==
It is found in most of the Palearctic – Europe to central Asia.
