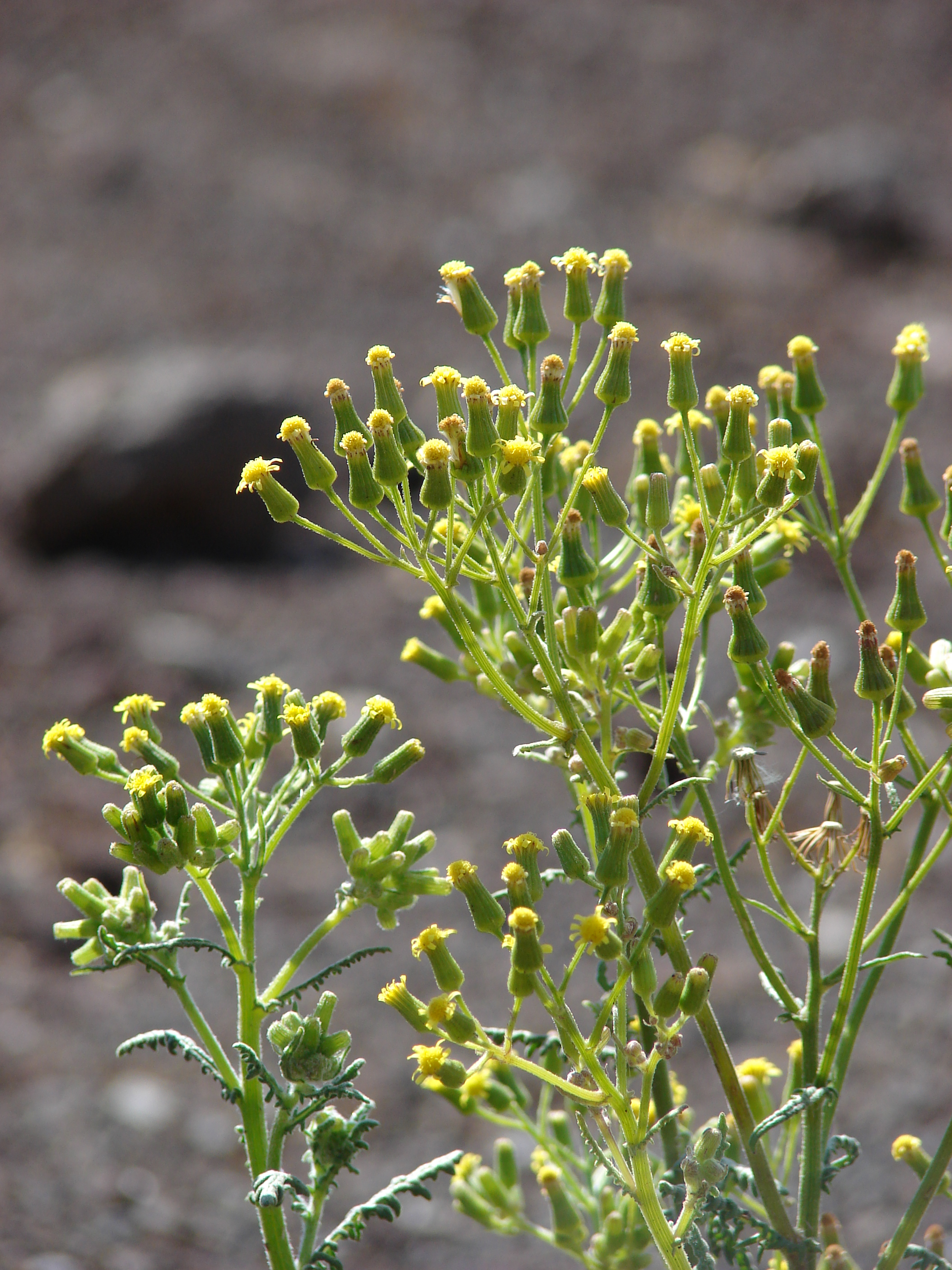

Scientific classification
- Kingdom: Plantae
- Clade: Tracheophytes
- Clade: Angiosperms
- Clade: Eudicots
- Clade: Asterids
- Order: Asterales
- Family: Asteraceae
- Genus: Senecio
- Species: S. sylvaticus

Binomial name
- Senecio sylvaticus L.

= Senecio sylvaticus =

Species of flowering plant

Senecio sylvaticus is a species of flowering plant in the aster family. It is variously known as the woodland ragwort, heath groundsel, or mountain common groundsel. It is native to Eurasia, and it can be found in other places, including western and eastern sections of North America, as an introduced species and an occasional roadside weed. It grows best in cool, wet areas. It is an annual herb producing a single erect stem up to 80 centimeters tall from a taproot. It is coated in short, curly hairs. The toothed, deeply lobed leaves are up to 12 centimeters long and borne on petioles. They are evenly distributed along the stem. The inflorescence is a wide, spreading array of many flower heads, each lined with green- or black-tipped phyllaries. The heads contain yellow disc florets and most have very tiny yellow ray florets as well.
