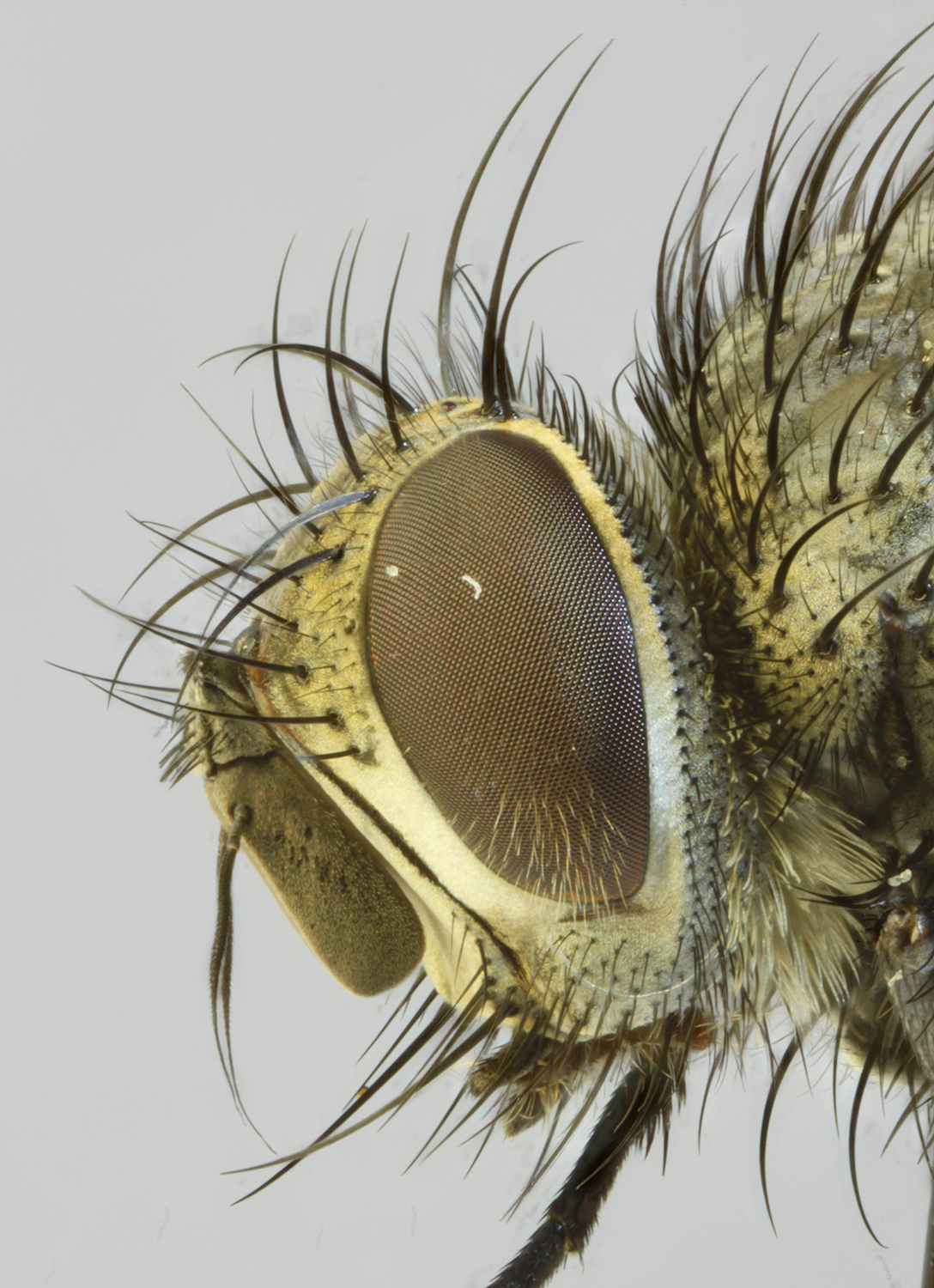
- Phryxe nemea North Wales

Scientific classification
- Kingdom: Animalia
- Phylum: Arthropoda
- Class: Insecta
- Order: Diptera
- Family: Tachinidae
- Subfamily: Exoristinae
- Tribe: Eryciini
- Genus: Phryxe
- Species: P. nemea

Binomial name
- Phryxe nemea (Meigen, 1824)

Synonyms
- Tachina nemea Meigen, 1824; Blepharidopsis hartigii Mik & Wachtl, 1895; Catachaeta depressariae Brauer & von Berganstamm, 1891; Exorista acris Macquart, 1850; Exorista parvula Macquart, 1850; Exorista vivax Rondani, 1868; Masicera montana Macquart, 1851; Phryxe aurea Robineau-Desvoidy, 1863; Phryxe aurifrons Robineau-Desvoidy, 1863; Phryxe aurocincta Robineau-Desvoidy, 1863; Phryxe binotata Robineau-Desvoidy, 1863; Phryxe pupivora Robineau-Desvoidy, 1863; Phryxe socia Robineau-Desvoidy, 1863; Phryxe spreta Robineau-Desvoidy, 1863; Tachina popularis Meigen, 1824; Tachina quadricincta Walker, 1853; Tachina straminifrons Zetterstedt, 1844; Tachina urbana Meigen, 1838

= Phryxe nemea =

Species of fly

Phryxe nemea is a species of fly in the family Tachinidae.

== Distribution ==
British Isles, Czech Republic, Hungary, Lithuania, Poland, Romania, Slovakia, Ukraine, Denmark, Finland, Norway, Sweden, Andorra, Bulgaria, Croatia, Greece, Italy, Serbia, Spain, Austria, Belgium, France, Germany, Netherlands, Switzerland, Japan, Iran, Russia, Transcaucasia, China.

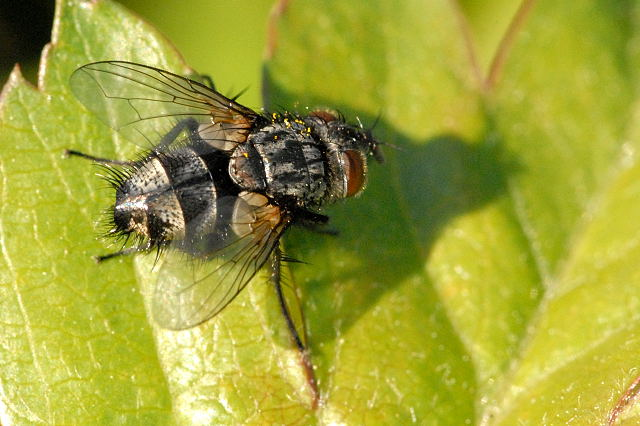
Phryxe nemea Belgium
