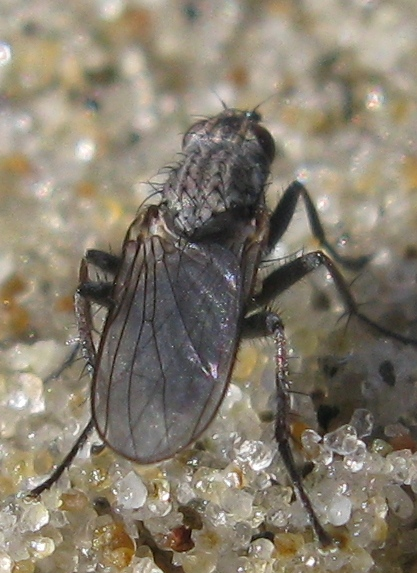

Scientific classification
- Kingdom: Animalia
- Phylum: Arthropoda
- Class: Insecta
- Order: Diptera
- Family: Anthomyiidae
- Subfamily: Anthomyiinae
- Tribe: Anthomyini
- Genus: Fucellia
- Species: F. maritima

Binomial name
- Fucellia maritima (Haliday, 1838)

= Fucellia maritima =

Species of fly

Fucellia maritima is a Palearctic and Nearctic species of kelp fly in the family Anthomyiidae. Adults are found in large numbers from March to September on the British Isles coast. The species is particularly attracted to Fucus sp. and Laminaria sp. seaweed.
