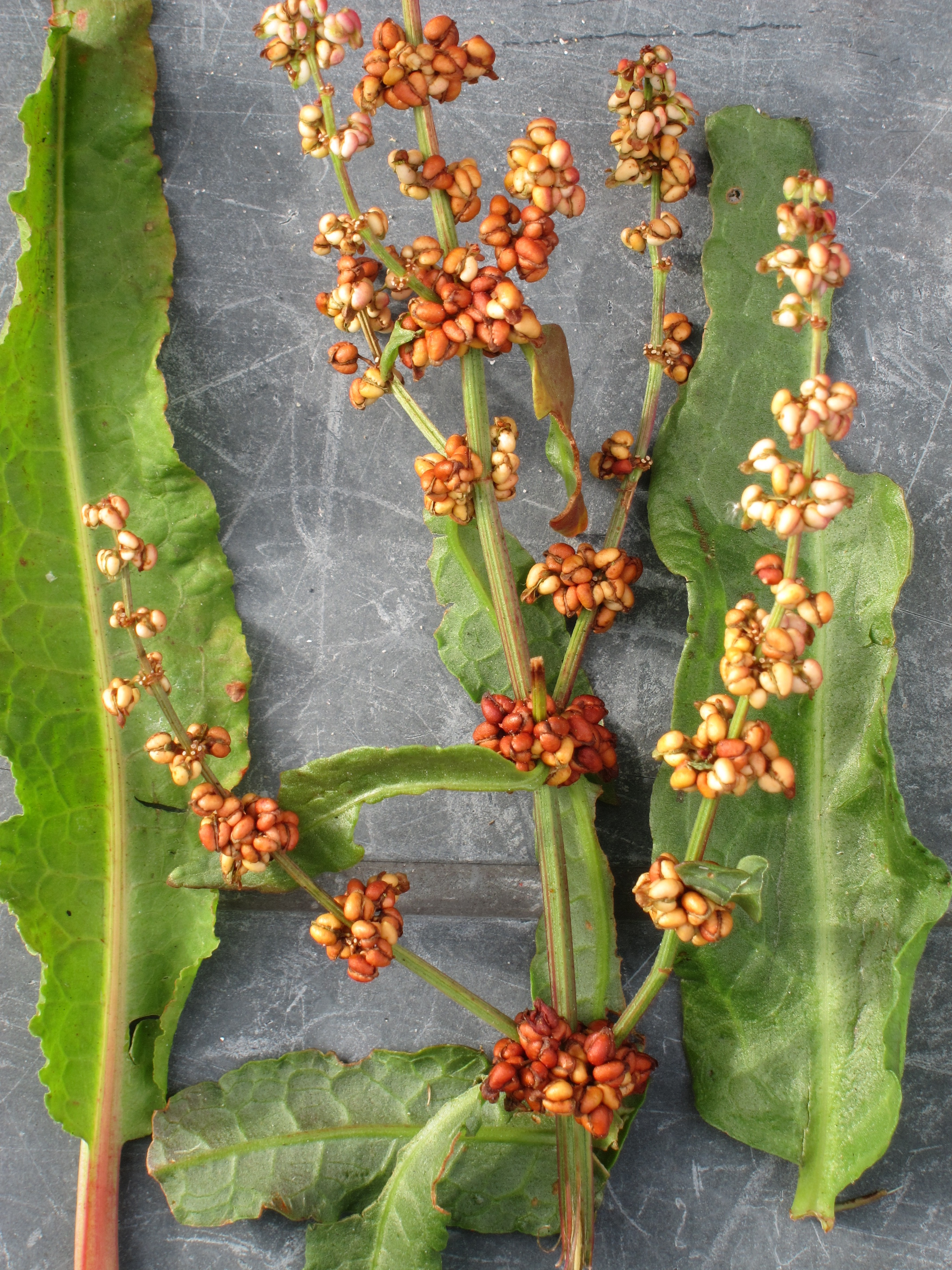

Conservation status
- Vulnerable (IUCN 3.1)

Scientific classification
- Kingdom: Plantae
- Clade: Tracheophytes
- Clade: Angiosperms
- Clade: Eudicots
- Order: Caryophyllales
- Family: Polygonaceae
- Genus: Rumex
- Species: R. rupestris

Binomial name
- Rumex rupestris Le Gall

= Rumex rupestris =

Species of flowering plant

Rumex rupestris, commonly known as shore dock, is a species of flowering plant belonging to the family Polygonaceae. Its native range is Western Europe and is one of the world's rarest dock species.

== Description ==
Rumex rupestris is a coarse stout woody perennial 30–50 cm (12–20 in) (sometimes up to 70 cm (28 in)) tall, with one or two shoots arising from the stock. The thick, dull bluish green leathery basal leaves are 10–30 cm (3.9–11.8 in) long with entire, wavy leaf margins. They are elliptic or broadly ovate-lanceolate shaped, tapering rather abruptly to a truncate or subcordate base. The petiole is less than a third the length of the leaf blade. Stem leaves are oblong-lanceolate, tapering gradually towards the base, with an acute tip at the leaf end. The leaf margins are wavy, crenate and subsessile.

The inflorescence comprises a dense panicle with ascending branches, usually making an angle of about 45 degrees with the main stem. The branches have numerous short crowded branchlets and 5–20 whorls of densely packed flowers.

The valves or tepals are blunt and entire, each measuring 3–4 mm (0.12–0.16 in) x 2–2.5 mm (0.079–0.098 in). Each valve bears a very swollen smooth elongated tubercle that occupies over 2/3 of the valve length, and almost the entire width. These swollen tubercles are the critical feature that distinguishes the species from similar species such as Rumex conglomeratus with considerably smaller tubercles. Vegetative identification of R. rupestris is difficult and can only be confirmed when the plant is in fruit (PlantLife).

The nut is reddish brown and trigonal, measuring about 2 mm × 1.5 mm (0.079 in × 0.059 in) and with acute angles. It is widest near the rounded base and sharply pointed at the tip.

== Distribution and habitat ==
Rumex rupestris is a European endemic restricted to small, scattered populations along the Atlantic coasts of western Europe. Its known distribution covers coastal areas of Anglesey, south Wales, south-western England, the Channel Islands, through France to Galicia and northern Spain. It was reported to be locally common on the Isles of Scilly, but more recently it is thought it may be extinct there.

Shore dock grows at or just above the mean high water mark in low-lying (up to 60 metres (200 ft)) coastal habitats, always with a constant supply a freshwater and in the presence of bare ground created by coastal erosion. Habitats typically include damp cliff edges or bases, seepage zones and wave-cut platforms. Less commonly, the plant grows in dune slacks and on sand or shingle beaches, as well as bedrock crevices with a submerged supply of freshwater from springs. It does not appear to have any specific soil requirements and can grow in soil-free crevices in sedimentary or metamorphic rocks, as well as fine blown sand and shingle.

== Ecology ==
R.rupestris occurs in very small localized populations often comprising fewer than 10 individuals per site, growing either separately or in small clumps. Populations occupy small areas of suitable habitat usually covering less than 1m^{2} and rarely extending beyond a few square meters. Although this plant occurs only in very small, scattered colonies, these could be functioning as components of larger metapopulations in the wider landscape. The floating fruits are dispersed by sea wave action, which potentially enables the plant to colonize new areas along the coast (PlantLife). However, due to the dynamic nature of the coastal environment where it grows, R. rupestris individuals that do become newly established in a small area of suitable habitat may survive for only one or a few years before being eradicated. Nevertheless, individuals occasionally reappear in sites from which they previously disappeared.

Rumex rupestris is a poorly competitive pioneer species favouring bare ground. It is susceptible to outcompetition by vigorous perennials such as Phragmites australis and Rubus fruticosus and therefore relies on regular coastal erosion and physical habitat disturbance to suppress stronger competitors, thereby allowing sufficient recruitment to seedlings. The plant can also withstand grazing by cattle, sheep, and horses, and this may provide an ecological benefit by preventing succession from open to closed vegetation.

== Threats and human impacts ==
The plant appears to be vulnerable to human impacts throughout its entire range. Threats include tourism pressures, cliff consolidation, construction of coastal defense works such as seawalls, marine pollution from oil spillage, sewage or fertilizer run-off, and possibly increased storminess through climate change. Coastal protection measures can reduce population both through direct loss of plant colonies and reduced erosion of sites. Nevertheless, shore dock is also vulnerable to population loss through the natural instability of its habitat and relatively small population size as well as habitat encroachment of more vigorous perennials, especially through agrochemical run-offs.

== Rarity and protection status ==
R. rupestris has been included on the Red List and is listed as endangered in the British Red Data Book. It is also protected under Schedule 8 of the Wildlife and Countryside Act 1981, as well as appearing in Annexes II and IV of the European Community Directive on the Conservation of Natural Habitats & Wild Fauna & Flora 1992 and in Annex I of the Bern Convention 1982.

This plant is listed as a priority species within the UK Biodiversity Action Plan and the Cornwall Local Biodiversity Plan. The first full species action plan for shore dock was prepared in 1999, most of which has since been executed by Plantlife, Natural England, the Centre for Ecology and Hydrology, the Countryside Council for Wales, and the National Trust. The ongoing activities ensure that localities with existing populations are monitored, new populations searched for, and the plant's ecological requirements accounted for during land management, developmental control and coastal defense works.

Although it is a rare species, shore dock has a range of life history traits that make it highly adapted to a physically disturbed habitat and harsh environmental conditions. For example, it can easily withstand effects of salt from sea spray. However, the physical disturbance of the dynamic environment that allows the plant to persist through exclusion of stronger competitors also prevents significant recruitment from seedlings. This irony may explain the plant's natural rarity.
