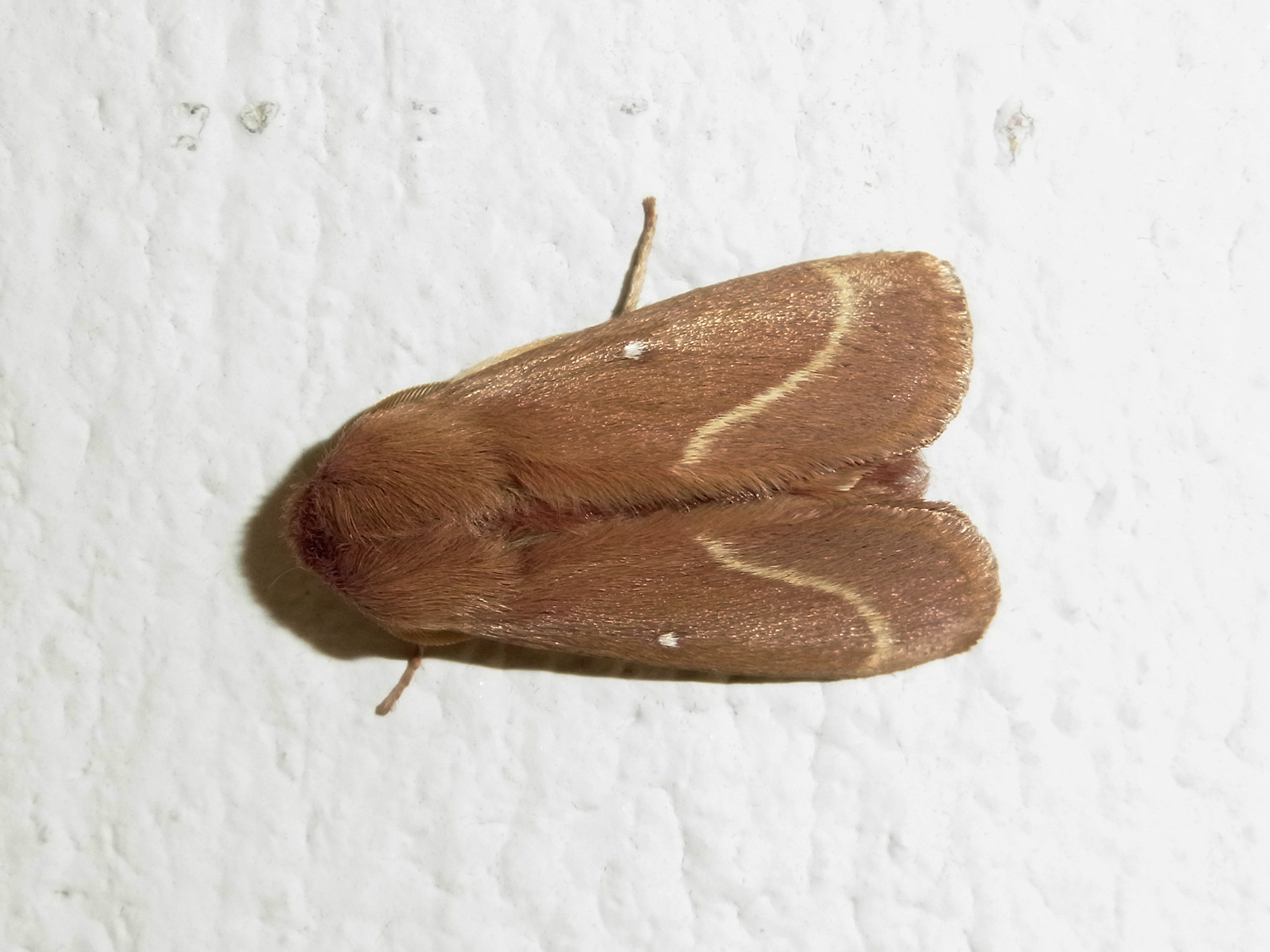
- Adult
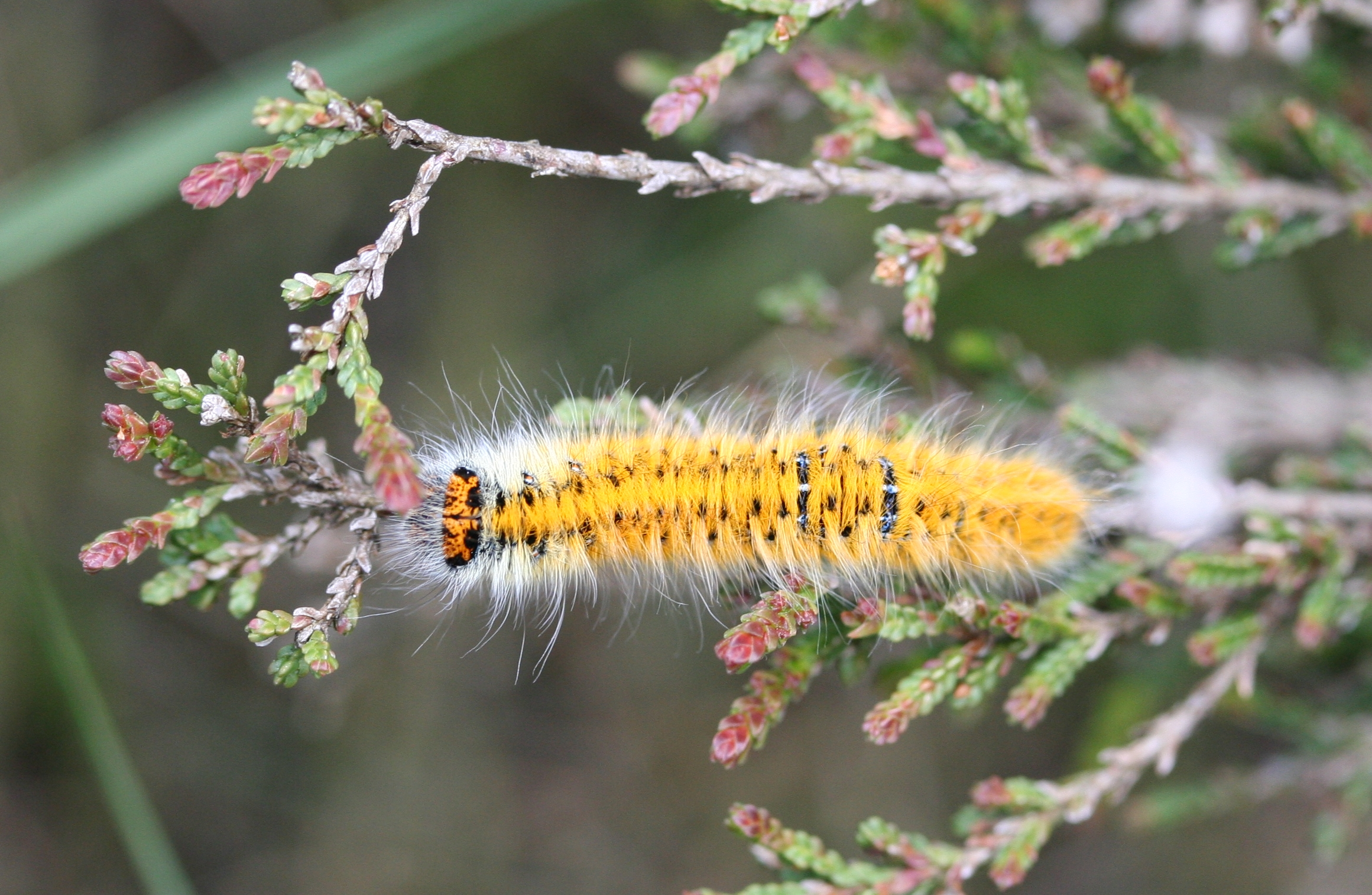
- Caterpillar from above

Scientific classification
- Domain: Eukaryota
- Kingdom: Animalia
- Phylum: Arthropoda
- Class: Insecta
- Order: Lepidoptera
- Family: Lasiocampidae
- Genus: Lasiocampa
- Species: L. trifolii

Binomial name
- Lasiocampa trifolii (Denis & Schiffermüller, 1775)

= Lasiocampa trifolii =

Grass eggar

Species of moth

Lasiocampa trifolii, the grass eggar, is a moth of the family Lasiocampidae first described by Michael Denis and Ignaz Schiffermüller in 1775 and found in Europe.

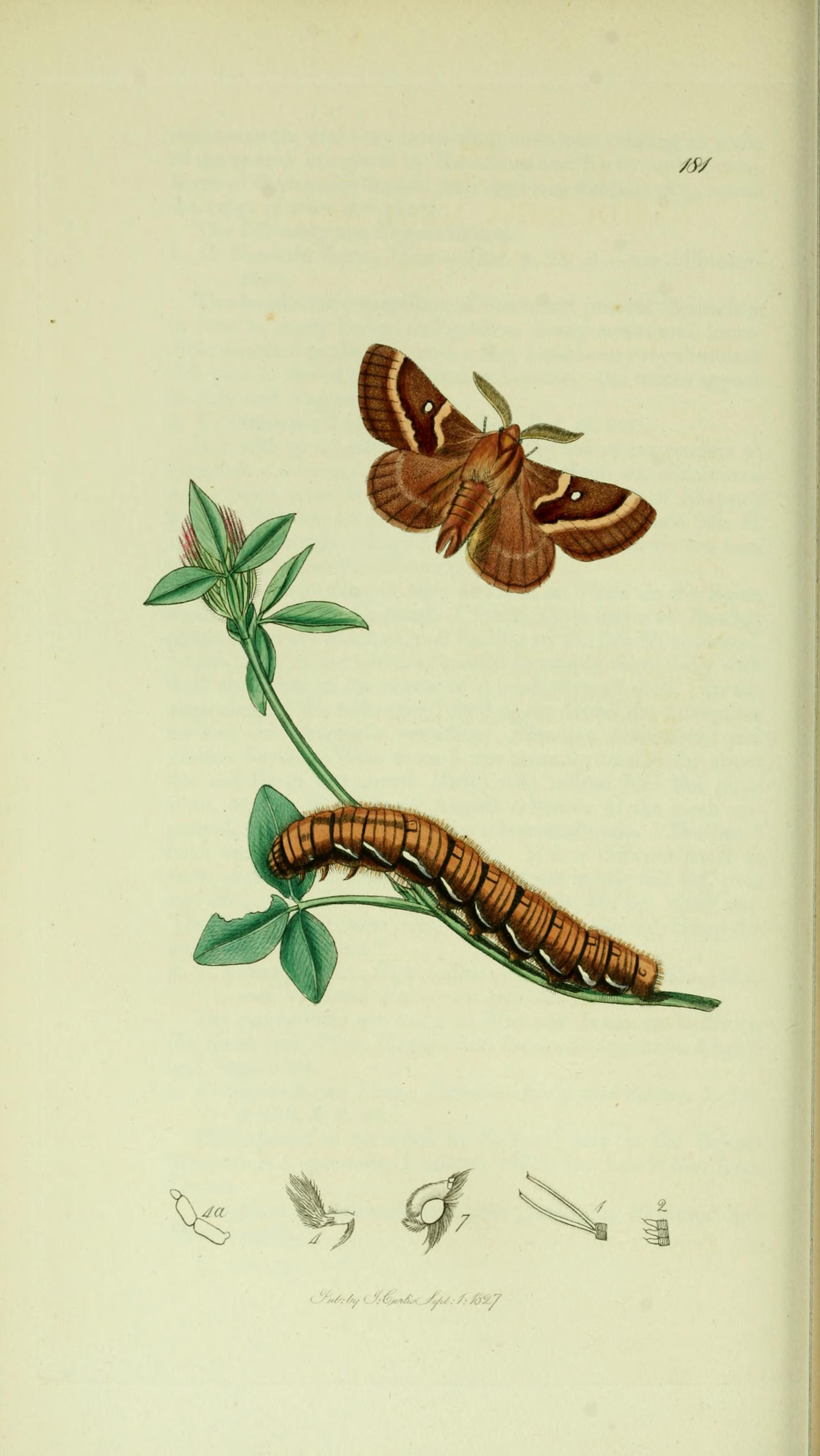
Illustration from John Curtis's British Entomology Volume 5

== Distribution and habitat ==
It is found in Europe in coastal dunes.

== Life cycle and behaviour ==
Eggs are laid on leaves close to the ground, hatch in the autumn, and the young larvae hibernate. The larvae feed on grasses, various shrubs and deciduous trees, such as oak, European beech, poplar and Calluna. The cocoon is formed on the ground.

Adults' wingspan is 40–55 mm and it flies from June to September depending on the location (in Britain it is on the wing in August). They fly during the day, but also at night, and will come to a light. The female is larger than the male.

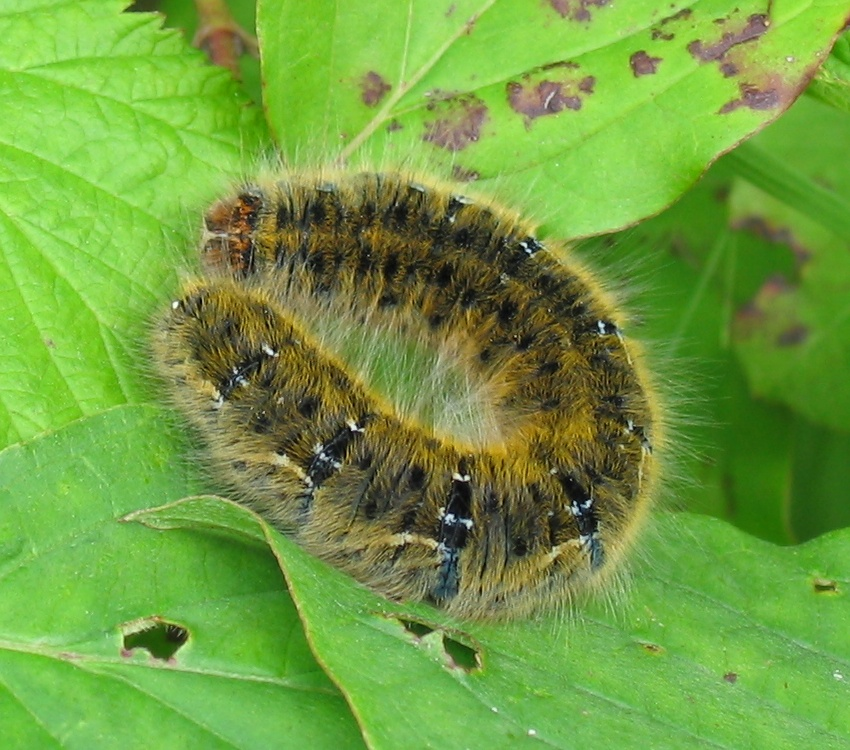
Caterpillar

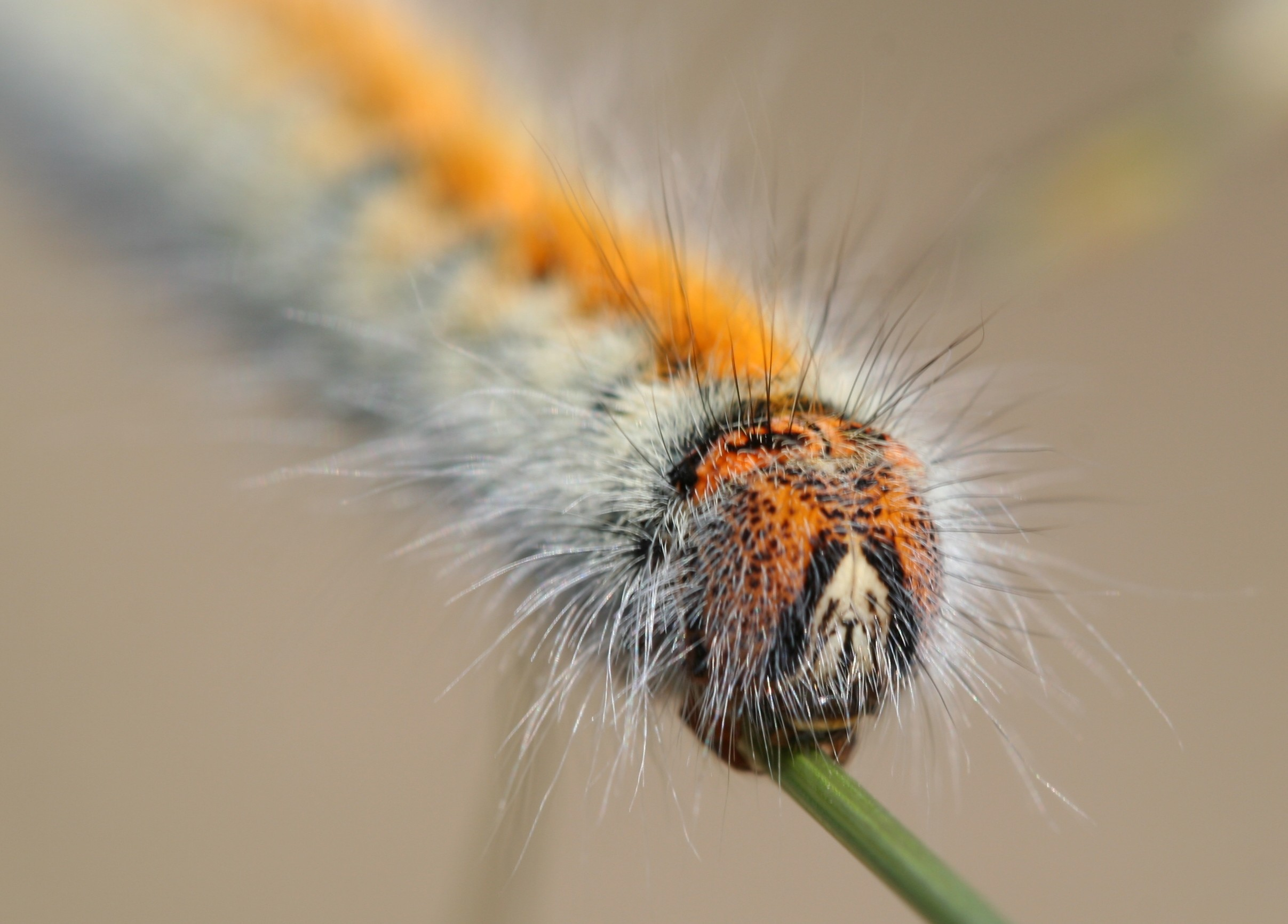
Caterpillar

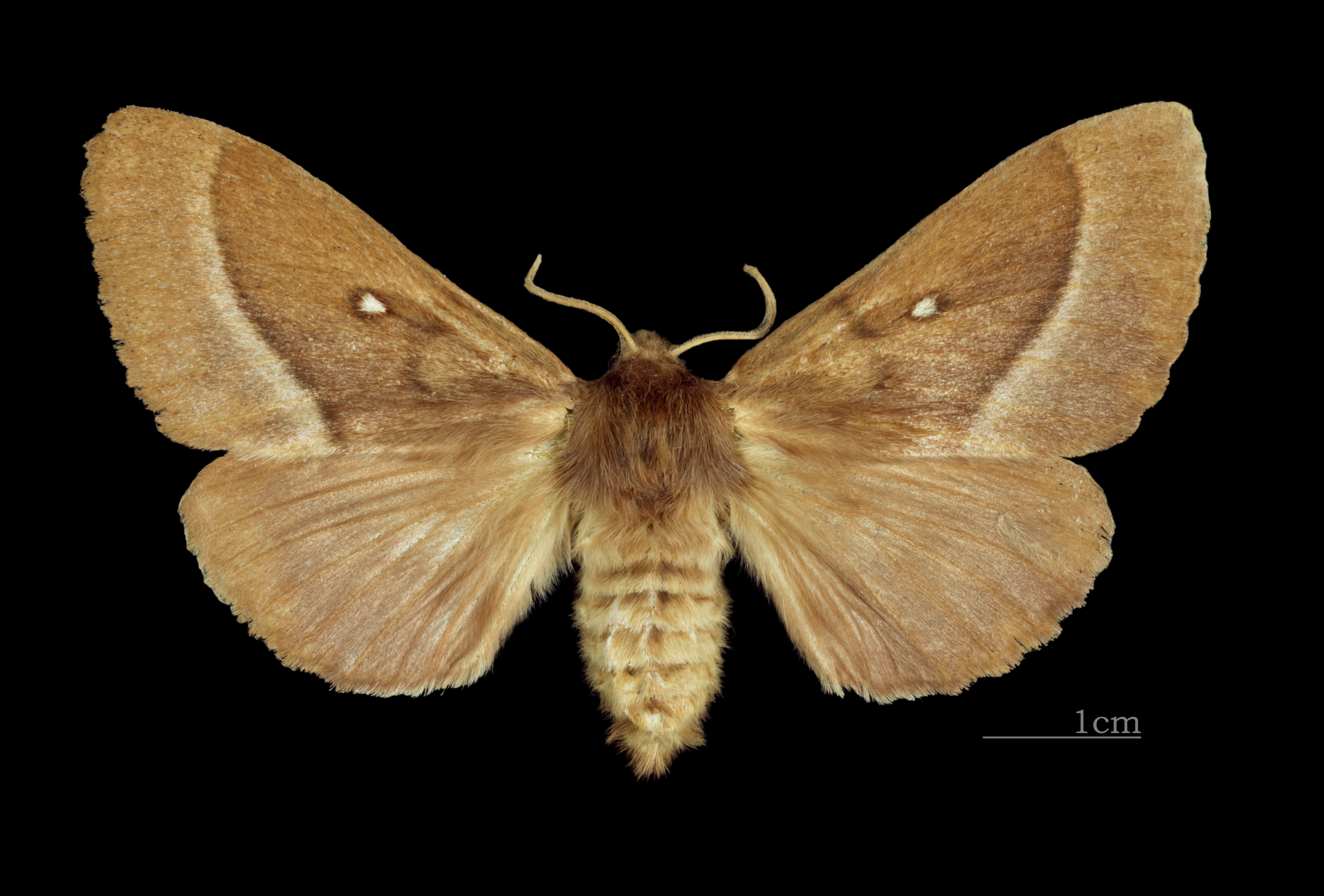
Female

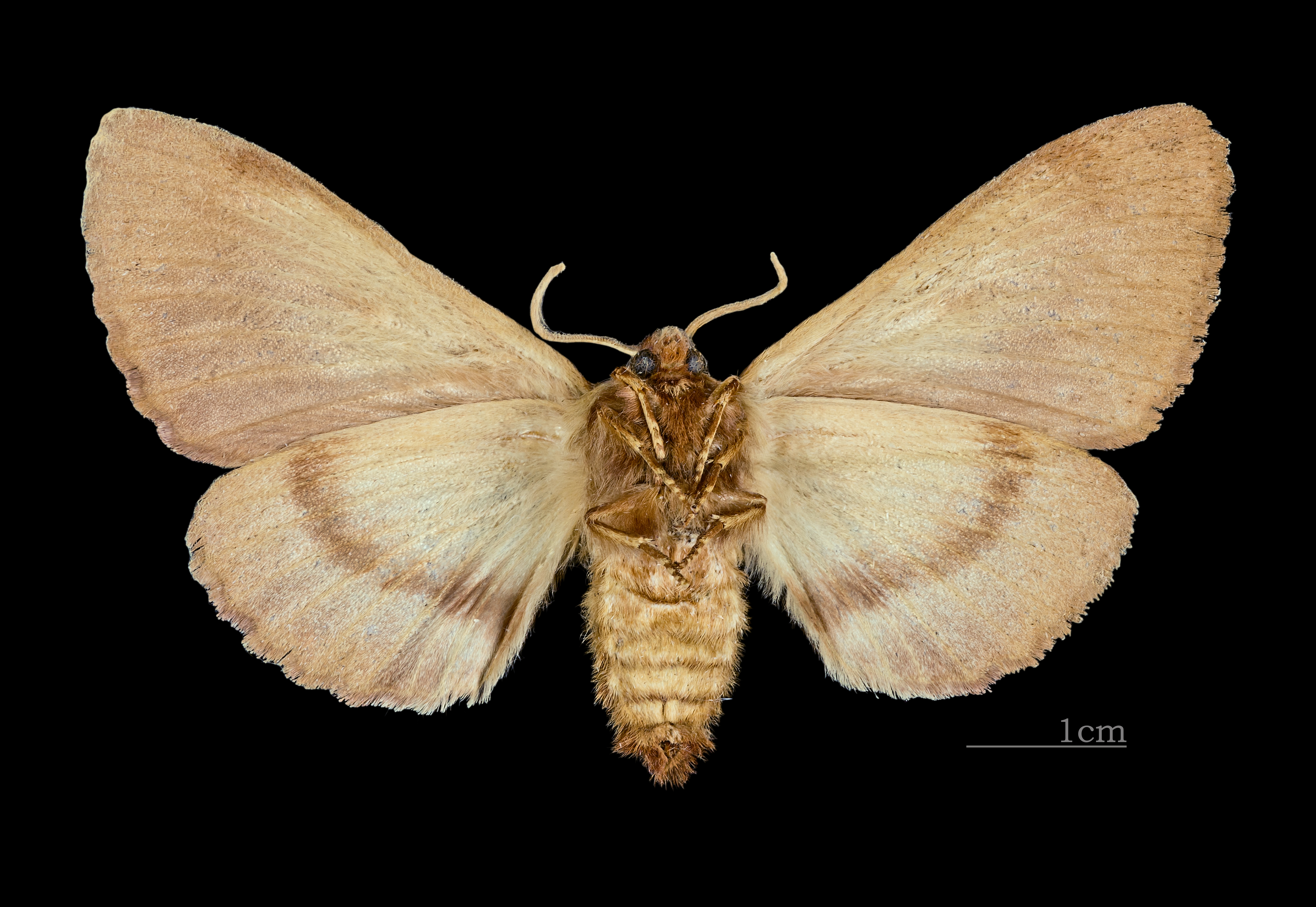
Female underside

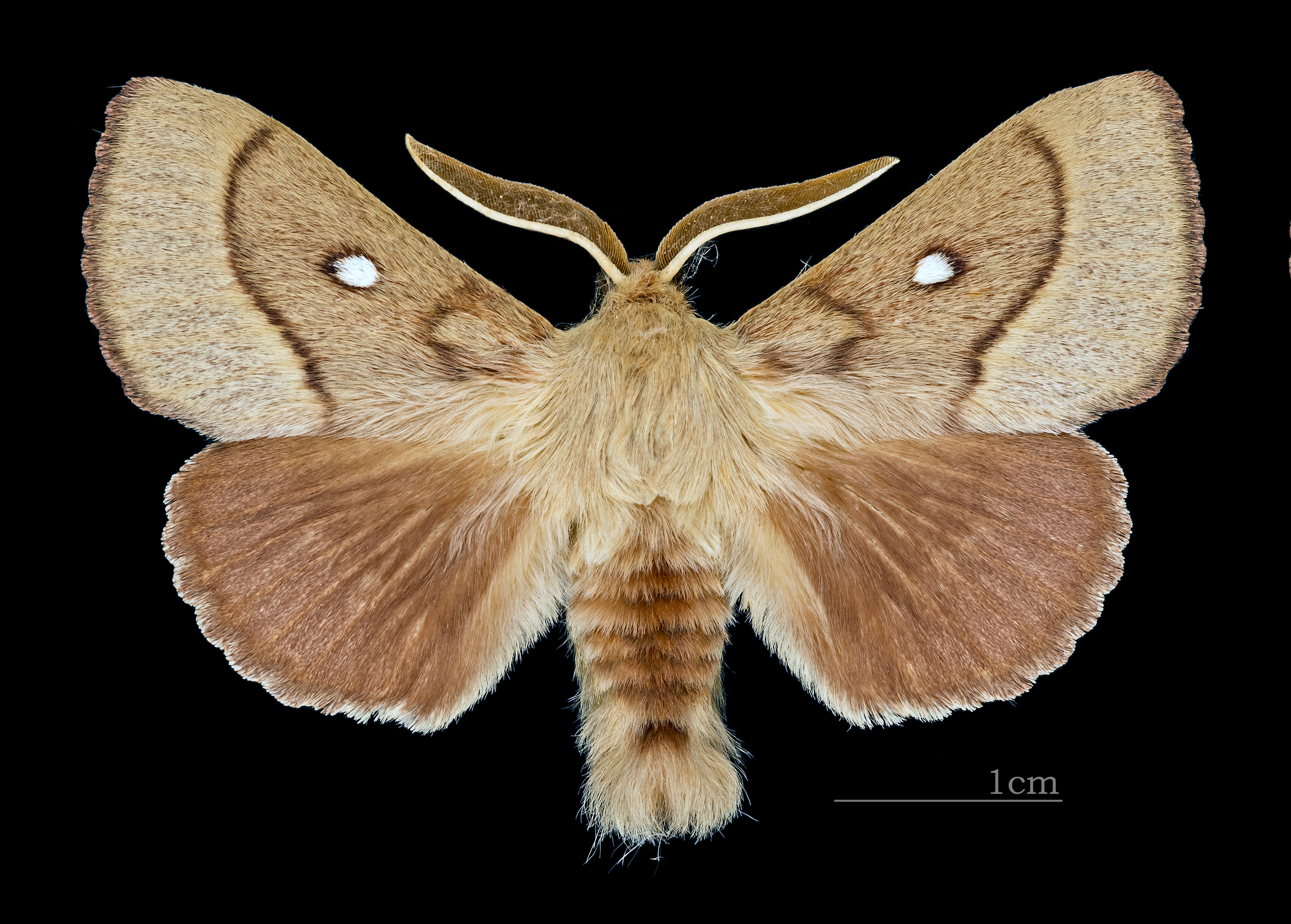
Male

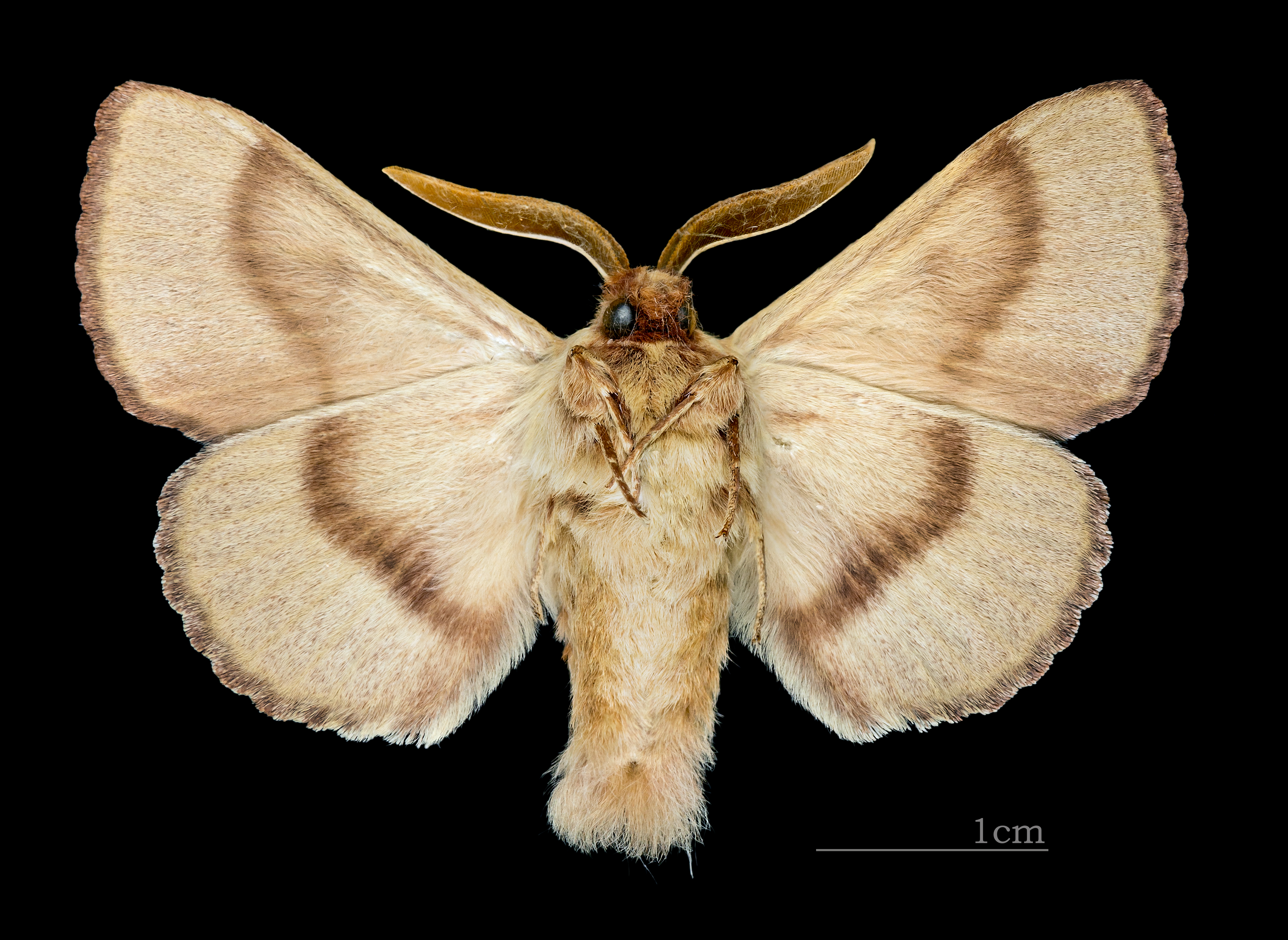
Male underside
