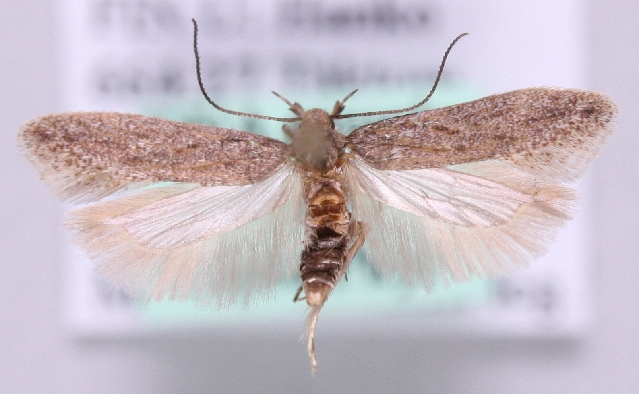

Scientific classification
- Domain: Eukaryota
- Kingdom: Animalia
- Phylum: Arthropoda
- Class: Insecta
- Order: Lepidoptera
- Family: Gelechiidae
- Genus: Scrobipalpa
- Species: S. nitentella

Binomial name
- Scrobipalpa nitentella (Fuchs, 1902)

Synonyms
- Lita nitentella Fuchs, 1902; Gnorimoschema nitentellum; Phthorimaea seminella Pierce & Metcalfe, 1935; Phthorimaea seminella f. spinosa Gaede, 1937

= Scrobipalpa nitentella =

Species of moth

Scrobipalpa nitentella, the common sea groundling, is a moth of the family Gelechiidae. It is found in most of Europe, North Africa (Tunisia), Turkey, Afghanistan, Kazakhstan, China (Qinghai, Xinjiang), Mongolia and Siberia (Transbaikalia).

The wingspan is 12–15 mm (0.47–0.59 in). A pale species difficult to very difficult to differentiate from other Scorobipalpa either from wing pattern or dissected genitalia.

Adults are on wing from July to August in one generation per year.

The larvae feed on Atriplex hastata, Atriplex hortensis, Atriplex littoralis, Atriplex praecox, Atriplex prostrate, Beta maritima, Chenopodium album, Halimione pedunculata, Halimione portulacoides, Salicornia europaea, Suaeda altissima and Suaeda maritima. Young larvae mine the leaves of their host plant. Full-grown larvae can be found from mid-August to the end of September.
