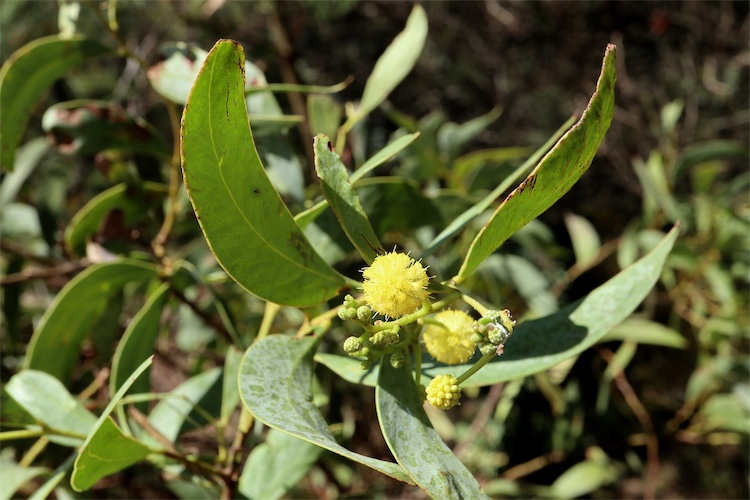
- In the Australian National Botanic Gardens

Conservation status
- Least Concern (IUCN 3.1)

Scientific classification
- Kingdom: Plantae
- Clade: Tracheophytes
- Clade: Angiosperms
- Clade: Eudicots
- Clade: Rosids
- Order: Fabales
- Family: Fabaceae
- Subfamily: Caesalpinioideae
- Clade: Mimosoid clade
- Genus: Acacia
- Species: A. confluens

Binomial name
- Acacia confluens Maiden & Blakely
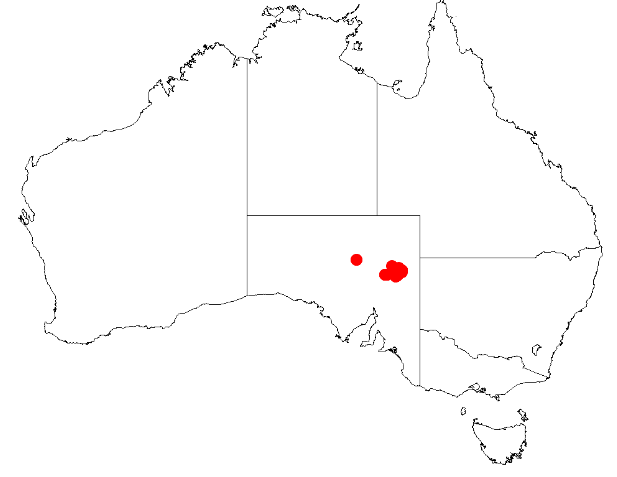
- Occurrence data from AVH

Synonyms
- Racosperma confluens (Maiden & Blakely) Pedley

= Acacia confluens =

Wyrilda

Species of plant

Acacia confluens, commonly known as wyrilda, is a species of flowering plant in the family Fabaceae and is endemic to South Australia. It is a shrub with a spreading, umbrella-like crown and glabrous branchlets, narrowly elliptic phyllodes, spherical heads of pale yellow to yellow flowers and glabrous, thickly leathery to more or less woody pods, rounded over the seeds.

== Description ==
Acacia confluens is a shrub with a spreading, umbrella-like crown, and that typically grows to a height of 2 to 3 m (6 ft 7 in to 9 ft 10 in) and has glabrous branchlets. Its phyllodes are glabrous, narrowly elliptic and curved, 60–140 mm (2.4–5.5 in) long and 5–25 mm (0.20–0.98 in) wide, but up to 25 mm (0.98 in) wide at the base of the branches. There are one or two glands usually 2–6 mm (0.079–0.236 in) above the base of the phyllodes. The flowers are borne is spherical heads in racemes mostly 20–40 mm (0.79–1.57 in) long on peduncles usually 6–15 mm (0.24–0.59 in) long. The heads are about 8 mm (0.31 in) in diameter with 40 to 60 pale yellow to yellow flowers. Flowering occurs roughly from June to September and the pods are rounded on opposite sides over alternate seeds, up to 250 mm (9.8 in) long and 12–17 mm (0.47–0.67 in) wide and thickly leathery to more or less woody and glabrous. The seeds are broadly elliptic, reddish brown to black and 6.5–7.5 mm (0.26–0.30 in) long with a club-shaped aril.

== Taxonomy ==
Acacia confluens was first formally described in 1927 by Joseph Maiden and William Blakely in the Journal and Proceedings of the Royal Society of New South Wales from specimens collected by Max Koch on Mount Lyndhurst. The specific epithet is taken from the Latin word confluens meaning 'flowing into' in reference to the way the main vein merges with the margin. Aboriginal people call the plant wyrilda, and used the seeds of the plant as food.

== Distribution and habitat ==
Wyrilda is endemic in South Australia, where it is found at the northern end of the Flinders Ranges, from Mount Lyndhurst east as far as Arkaroola in the Tirari Desert and Sturt Stony Desert regions where it grows in gullies and on stony hillsides in skeletal, calcareous loamy soils in tall shrubland.

== See also ==
- List of Acacia species
