= Swainsona leeana =

Scientific classification
- Kingdom: Plantae
- Clade: Tracheophytes
- Clade: Angiosperms
- Clade: Eudicots
- Clade: Rosids
- Order: Fabales
- Family: Fabaceae
- Subfamily: Faboideae
- Genus: Swainsona
- Species: S. leeana

Binomial name
- Swainsona leeana J.Z.Weber

Species of legume

Swainsona leeana is a species of flowering plant in the family Fabaceae and is endemic to the south-west of Australia. It is a small prostrate perennial, possible perennial with imparipinnate leaves with 5 to 7 broadly egg-shaped or elliptic leaflets, and racemes of up to 3 purple or yellow flowers.

== Description ==
Swainsona laciniata is a prostrate annual, or possibly perennial herb, that typically grows to a height of up to 10 cm (3.9 in) with many stems. Its leaves are imparipinnate, mostly 10–30 mm (0.39–1.18 in) long with up to 3 broadly elliptic to elliptic leaflets mostly 5–10 mm (0.20–0.39 in) long and 1–3 mm (0.039–0.118 in) wide. There are stipules 3–5 mm (0.12–0.20 in) long at the base of the petiole. The flowers are arranged in racemes mostly 10–60 mm (0.39–2.36 in) long with up to 3 flowers on a peduncle less than 0.5 mm (0.020 in) wide, each flower 3–5 mm (0.12–0.20 in) long on a hairy pedicel about 1 mm (0.039 in) long. The sepals are joined at the base, forming a tube less than 1 mm (0.039 in) long, the sepal lobes about twice as long as the tube. The petals are purple or yellow, the standard petal about 4 mm (0.16 in) long and 5 mm (0.20 in) wide, the wings about 4 mm (0.16 in) long, and the keel about 5 mm (0.20 in) long and 1.5 mm (0.059 in) deep. Flowering occurs in September and October, and the fruit is a pod broadly elliptic pod mostly 8–10 mm (0.31–0.39 in) long and 5–7 mm (0.20–0.28 in) wide.

== Taxonomy and naming ==
Swainsona leeana was first formally described in 1985 by Joseph Zvonko Weber in the Journal of the Adelaide Botanic Gardens, from specimens collected on Mount Lyndhurst in 1973. The specific epithet (leeana) honours Alma Theodora Lee.

== Distribution and habitat ==
This species of pea grows in stony soil or clay-loam in dry watercourses in scattered locations in the Carnarvon, Coolgardie, Gascoyne, Gibson Desert, Great Victoria Desert, Murchison, Pilbara and Yalgoo bioregions of northern Western Australia and in the Flinders Ranges and Kati Thanda–Lake Eyre regions of South Australia.
