= Coleophora serinipennella =

Scientific classification
- Kingdom: Animalia
- Phylum: Arthropoda
- Class: Insecta
- Order: Lepidoptera
- Family: Coleophoridae
- Genus: Coleophora
- Species: C. serinipennella

Binomial name
- Coleophora serinipennella Christoph, 1872

Synonyms
- Plutella ochroneura Lower, 1897; Coleophora ochroneura (Lower, 1897); Coleophora stefanii de Joannis, 1899; Coleophora pudica Lower, 1905; Coleophora novella Chrétien, 1926; Coleophora caliacraella Caradja, 1931; Coleophora jerichoella Amsel, 1935; Coleophora jordanella Amsel, 1935; Coleophora sosisperma Meyrick, 1936; Coleophora deserticola Toll, 1944; Coleophora soffneri Toll, 1944

Species of moth

Coleophora serinipennella is a moth of the family Coleophoridae. It is found in southern Europe, North Africa, the Near East, the eastern Palearctic realm (including Japan), as well as in Australia in south-western Queensland, South Australia and arid areas of Western Australia south of Carnarvon.

The wingspan is 14–17 millimetres (0.55–0.67 in). Adults are on wing from June to August.

The larvae feed on Atriplex, Halimione and Chenopodium species. They make galls in the stems of their host plant.
