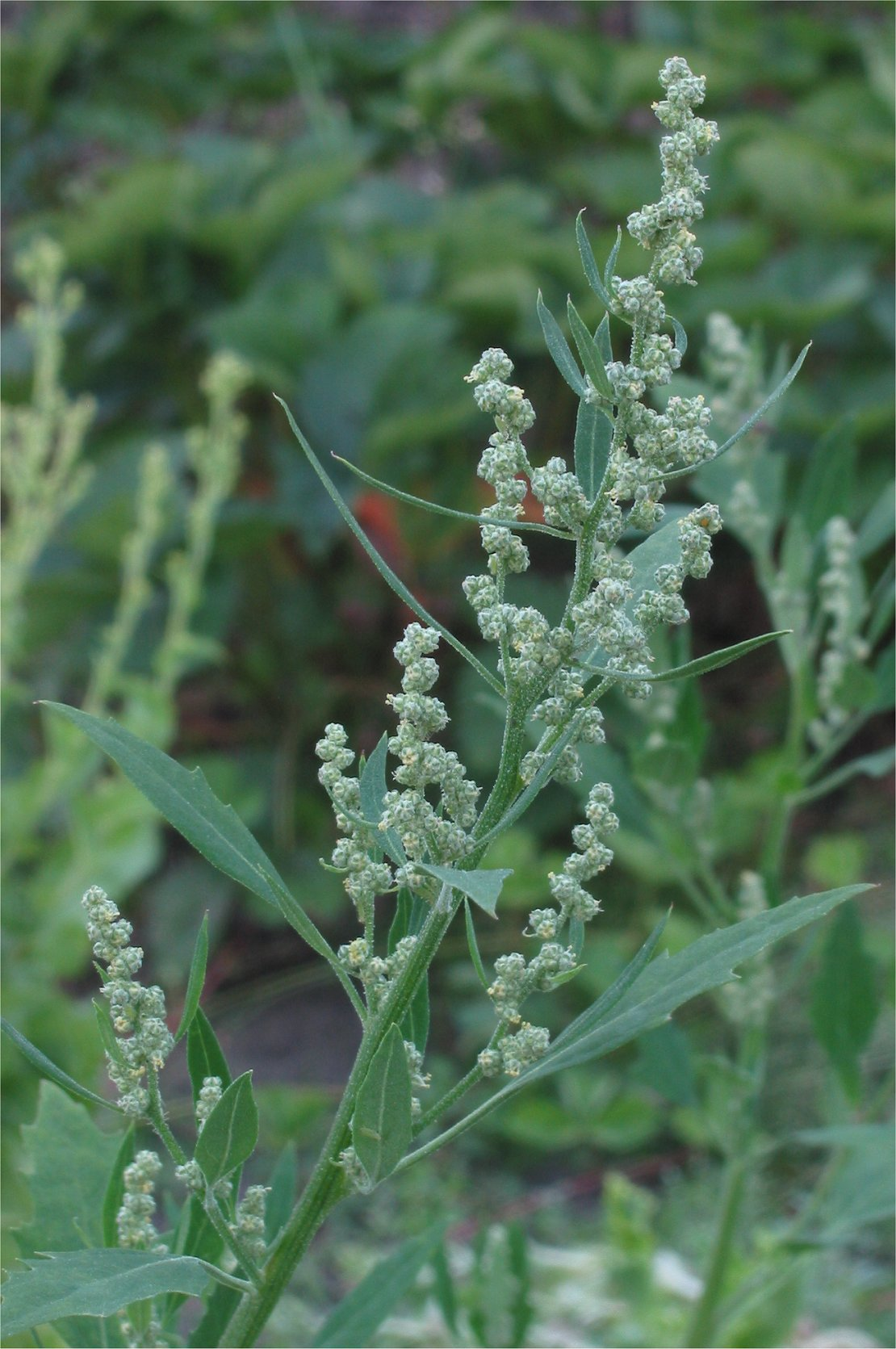

Conservation status
- Secure (NatureServe)

Scientific classification
- Kingdom: Plantae
- Clade: Embryophytes
- Clade: Tracheophytes
- Clade: Angiosperms
- Clade: Eudicots
- Order: Caryophyllales
- Family: Amaranthaceae
- Genus: Chenopodium
- Species: C. album

Binomial name
- Chenopodium album L.
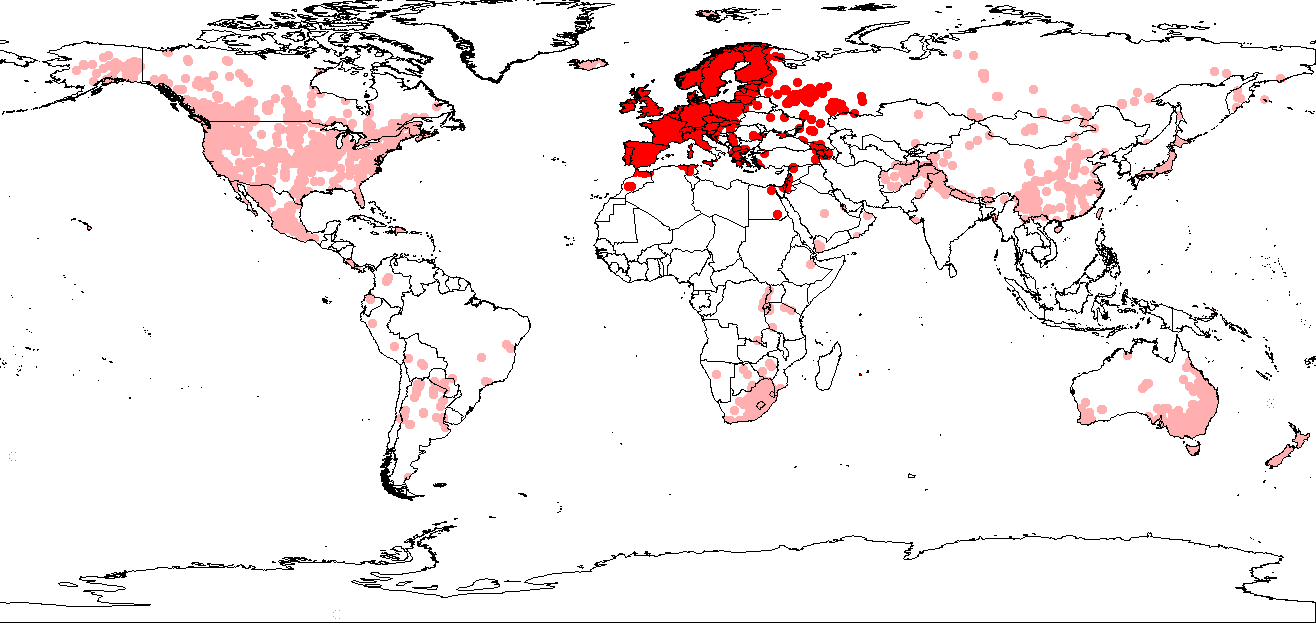
- Distribution, from GBIF

Synonyms
- Atriplex alba (L.) Crantz (1766); Botrys albus (L.) Nieuwl. (1914); Chenopodium album var. commune Moq. (1849), not validly publ.; Chenopodium viride var. album (L.) Hartm. (1820)

= Chenopodium album =

Species of flowering plant in the goosefoot family

Chenopodium album is a fast-growing annual plant in the flowering plant family Amaranthaceae. Though cultivated in some regions, the plant is elsewhere considered a weed. Common names include lamb's quarters, melde, goosefoot, wild spinach and fat-hen, though several are also applied to other species of the genus Chenopodium, for which reason it is often distinguished as white goosefoot.

== Description ==
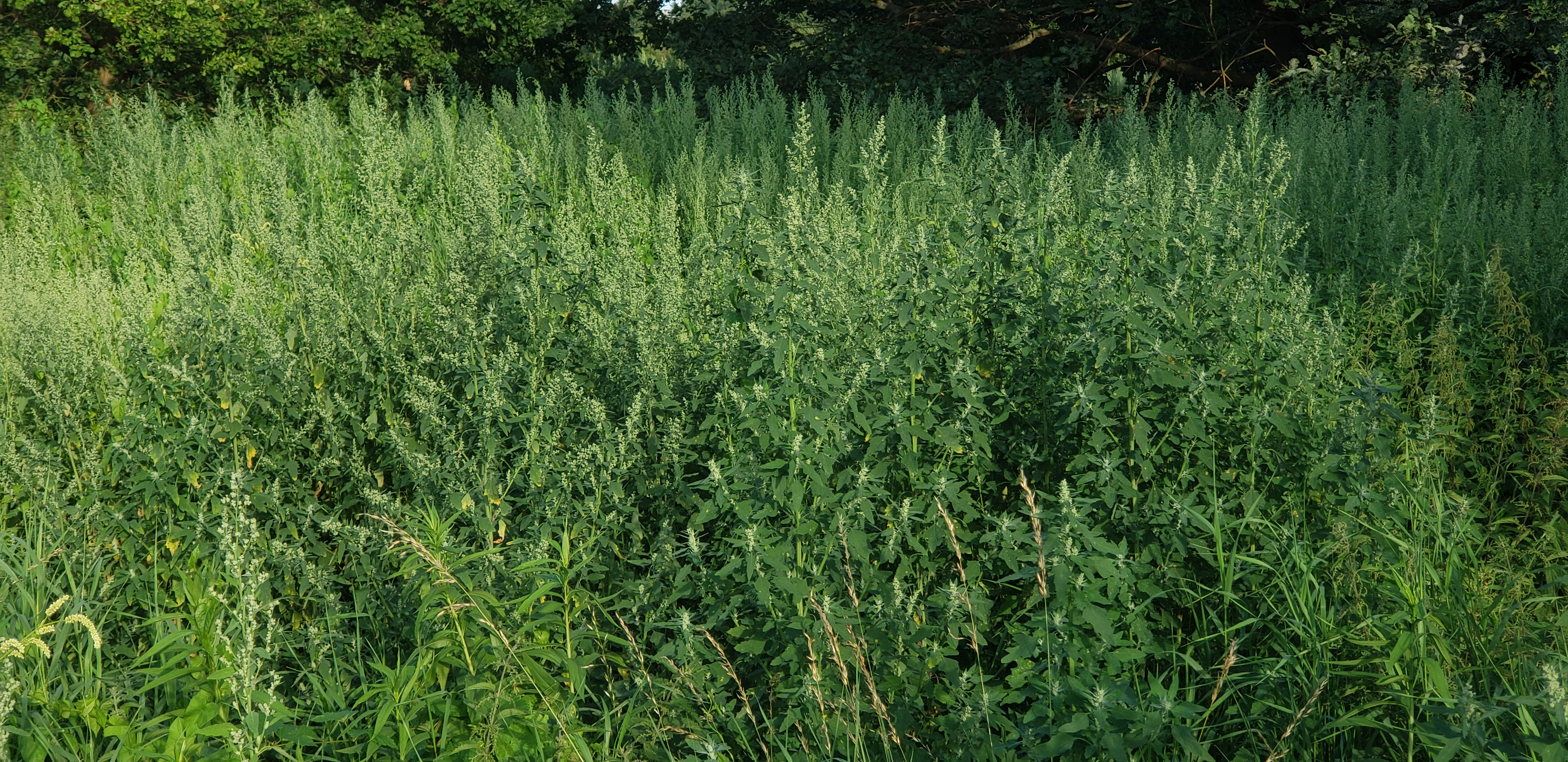
Wild spinach

It tends to grow upright at first, reaching heights of 10–150 centimetres (4–59 in), rarely to 3 m; it then typically becomes recumbent after flowering (due to the weight of the foliage and seeds) unless supported by other plants. The leaves are alternate and varied in appearance. The first leaves, near the base of the plant, are toothed and roughly diamond-shaped, 3–7 cm long and 3–6 cm broad. The leaves on the upper part of the flowering stems are entire and lanceolate-rhomboid, 1–5 cm long and 0.4–2 cm broad; they are waxy-coated, unwettable and mealy in appearance, with a whitish coat on the underside. The small flowers are radially symmetrical and grow in small cymes on a dense branched inflorescence 10–40 cm long. Further, the flowers are bisexual and female, with five tepals which are mealy on outer surface, and shortly united at the base. There are five stamens.

=== Similar species ===
Poisonous black nightshade looks similar to this species when young, but the leaves of C. album have a white mealy texture and its axils have a red streak.

== Taxonomy ==
Chenopodium album has a complex taxonomy and has been divided into numerous microspecies, subspecies and varieties, but it is difficult to differentiate between them. The following varieties are accepted by Plants of the World Online:

- Chenopodium album var. album – temperate Eurasia and Indian subcontinent, North Africa, and Ethiopia
- Chenopodium album var. missouriense (Aellen) Bassett & Crompton (synonym Chenopodium missouriense Aellen) – eastern and central United States
- Chenopodium album var. reticulatum (Aellen) Uotila (synonym Chenopodium reticulatum Aellen) – France and Great Britain

== Distribution and habitat ==
Its native range is obscure due to extensive cultivation, but includes most of Europe, from where Carl Linnaeus described the species in 1753. Plants native to eastern Asia are included under C. album, but often differ from European specimens. According to Plants of the World Online, the species' natural distribution includes temperate Eurasia from western Europe to China and the Russian Far East, the Indian subcontinent, North Africa, Ethiopia, and the eastern and central United States.

It is widely naturalized elsewhere, such as in Africa, Australasia, North America, and Oceania, and now occurs almost everywhere (except Antarctica) in soils rich in nitrogen, especially on wasteland.

== Cultivation ==
=== Regions ===
The species are cultivated as a grain or vegetable crop (such as in lieu of spinach), as well as animal feed in Asia and Africa, whereas in Europe and North America, it is commonly regarded as a weed in places such as potato fields, while in Australia it is naturalised in all states and regarded as an environmental weed in New South Wales, Victoria, Western Australia and the Northern Territory. While var. album is considered invasive in some regions of the U.S., var. missouriense is native.

=== Potential impact on conventional crops ===
It is one of the more robust and competitive weeds, exceptionally capable of colonizing new areas. It may produce up to 50 million seeds per hectare, its seeds remain viable 30 to 40 years in the soil, and it exhibits high phenotype plasticity, modifying its growth form for the conditions it is in. It may be controlled by dark tillage, rotary hoeing, or flaming when the plants are small. Crop rotation of small grains will suppress an infestation. It is easily controlled with a number of pre-emergence herbicides. Its pollen may contribute to hay fever-like allergies.

=== Pest control ===
Chenopodium album is vulnerable to leaf miners, making it a useful trap crop as a companion plant. Growing near other plants, it attracts leaf miners which might otherwise have attacked the crop to be protected. It is a host plant for the beet leafhopper, an insect which transmits curly top virus to beet crops.

== Uses ==
Lambsquarters, raw
Nutritional value per 100 g (3.5 oz)
- Energy: 180 kJ (43 kcal)
- Carbohydrates: 7.3 g
- Dietary fiber: 4 g
- Fat: 0.8 g
- Protein: 4.2 g
Vitamins and minerals
Vitamins	Quantity %DV^{†}
Vitamin A equiv.	64% 580 μg
Thiamine (B1)	13% 0.16 mg
Riboflavin (B2)	34% 0.44 mg
Niacin (B3)	8% 1.2 mg
Pantothenic acid (B5)	2% 0.092 mg
Vitamin B6	16% 0.274 mg
Folate (B9)	8% 30 μg
Vitamin C	89% 80 mg
Minerals	Quantity %DV^{†}
Calcium	24% 309 mg
Iron	7% 1.2 mg
Magnesium	8% 34 mg
Manganese	34% 0.782 mg
Phosphorus	6% 72 mg
Potassium	15% 452 mg
Sodium	2% 43 mg
Zinc	4% 0.44 mg
- Other constituents: Quantity
- Water: 84 g
- Link to USDA Database entry
- ^{†}Percentages estimated using US recommendations for adults, except for potassium, which is estimated based on expert recommendation from the National Academies.

=== Nutrition ===
Raw lamb's quarters are 84% water, 7% carbohydrates, 4% protein, and 1% fat. In a 100 gram reference amount, lamb's quarters provide 43 kilocalories, and are a rich source (20% or more of the Daily Value, DV) of vitamin C (96% DV), vitamin A (73% DV), riboflavin (37% DV), vitamin B6 (21% DV), manganese (37% DV), and calcium (31% DV), with several other dietary minerals in lesser amounts.

=== Culinary uses ===
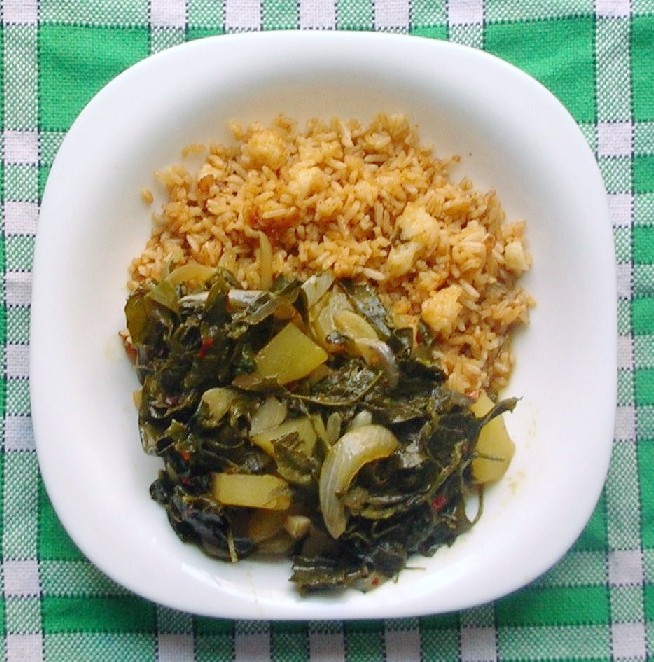
Rice and C. album leaf curry with onions and potatoes

The young shoots may be eaten raw or cooked. The leaves are preferably cooked.

The flower buds and flowers can also be eaten cooked. Each plant produces tens of thousands of black seeds. Quinoa, a closely related species, is grown specifically for its seeds. The Zuni people cook the young plants' greens.

Archaeologists analysing carbonized plant remains found in storage pits and ovens at Iron Age, Viking Age, and Roman sites in Europe have found its seeds mixed with conventional grains and even inside the stomachs of Danish bog bodies.

In India, the plant is called bathua and is found abundantly in the winter season. The leaves and young shoots of this plant are used in dishes such as soups, curries, and paratha – stuffed breads, common in North India. The seeds or grains are used in phambra, gruel-type dishes in Himachal Pradesh, and in mildly alcoholic fermented beverages such as soora and ghanti. In Haryana state, the "bathue ka raita" i.e. the raita (yogurt accompaniment) made with bathua, is commonly eaten in winters.

In Nepal, it is known as bethe or bethu. It is used to make a dish known as saag. The leaves are stir-fried with spices, chilli and diced garlic. A fermented dish known as masaura is also made by dipping the leaves in a lentil batter with spices and then drying them in sun for some days. The fermented masaura can be made into a curry and served with rice.

=== Animal feed ===
As some of the common names suggest, it is also used as feed (both the leaves and the seeds) for chickens and other poultry.

=== Construction ===
The juice of this plant is a potent ingredient for a mixture of wall plaster, according to the Samarāṅgaṇa Sūtradhāra, which is a Sanskrit treatise dealing with Śilpaśāstra (Hindu science of art and construction).

=== Ayurveda ===
In Ayurveda traditional medicine, bathua is thought to be useful for treating various diseases, although there is no clinical evidence such uses are safe or effective.

== Gallery ==
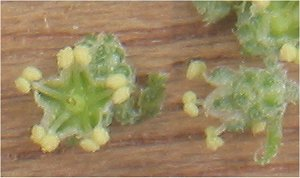
Close-up of flower and flower bud
