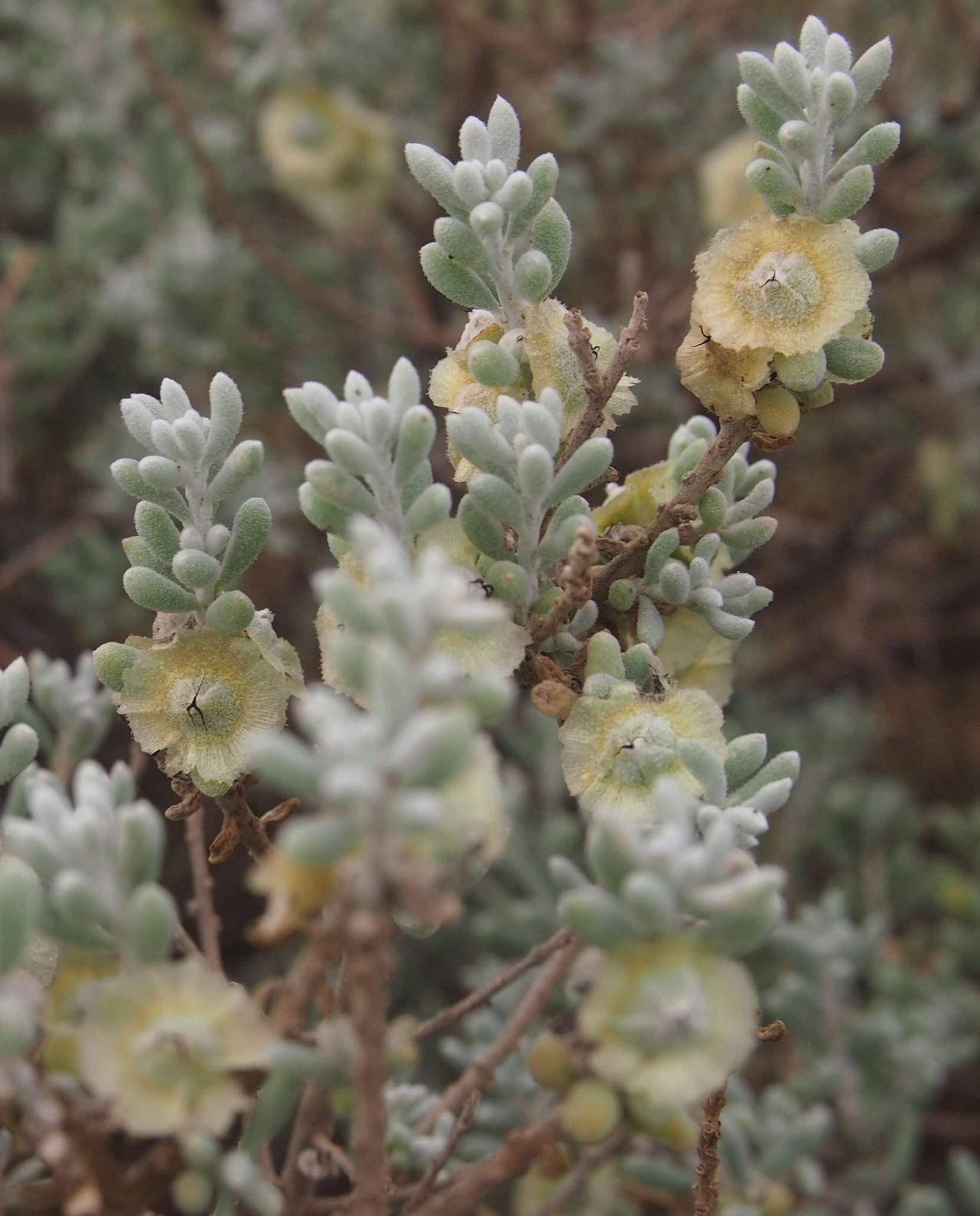
- Foliage and fruit
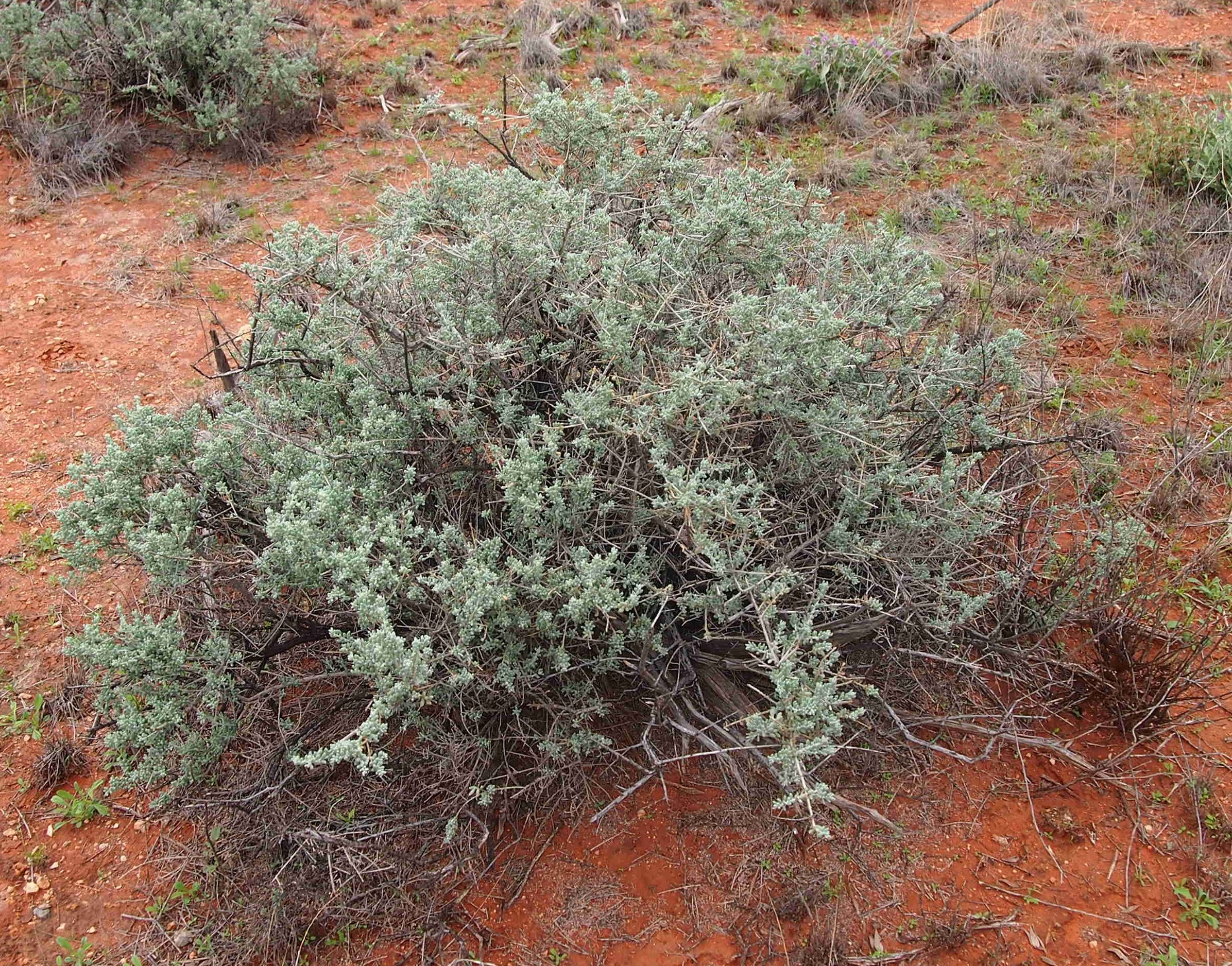
- Habit

Scientific classification
- Kingdom: Plantae
- Clade: Tracheophytes
- Clade: Angiosperms
- Clade: Eudicots
- Order: Caryophyllales
- Family: Amaranthaceae
- Genus: Maireana
- Species: M. astrotricha

Binomial name
- Maireana astrotricha (L.A.S.Johnson) Paul G.Wilson
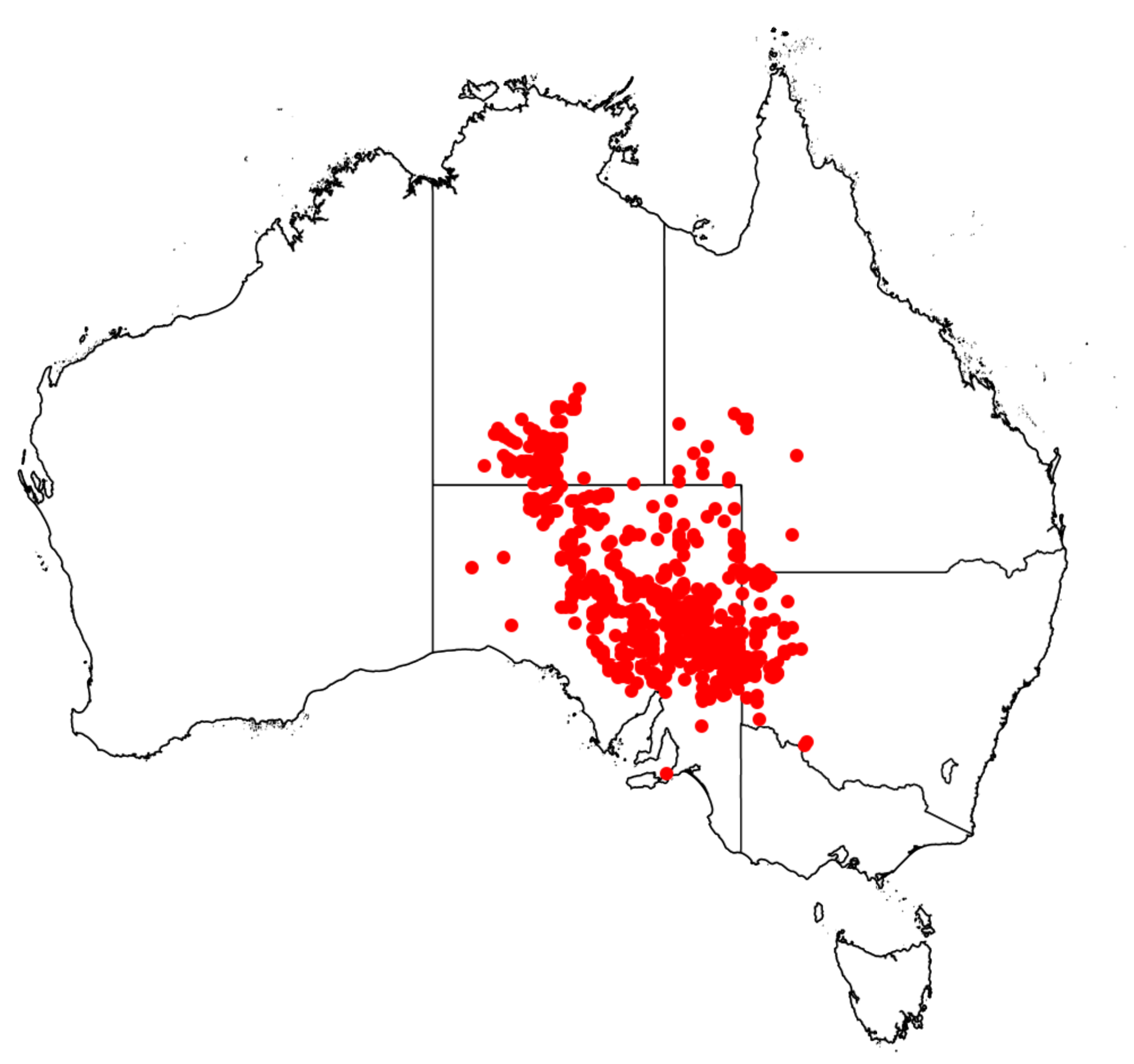
- Occurrence data from AVH

Synonyms
- Kochia astrotricha L.A.S.Johnson; Kochia sedifolia var. stellulata J.M.Black

= Maireana astrotricha =

Species of plant

Maireana astrotricha, commonly known as low bluebush, southern bluebush, or grey bluebush, is a widely branched, perennial plant with fleshy leaves, male, female or bisexual flowers and a winged fruiting perianth, and is usually found growing in open habitats, typically in gravelly, well-drained soils, in New South Wales, Queensland and the Northern Territory.

== Description ==
Maireana astrotricha is a rounded, widely branched perennial plant up to 1m high, with its branches and leaves covered with matted hairs. The leaves are arranged alternately, fleshy, narrowly to broadly egg-shaped with the narrower end towards the base, 5–10 mm (0.20–0.39 in) long with a base tapered to a short petiole.

The flowers are arranged singly in leaf axils, densely hairy, polygamodioecious, male or female, the male flowers hemispherical and the female spherical, with tiny bracts at the base. The fruiting perianth is densely hairy on the outside apart from the glabrous wing and the tube is about 3 mm (0.12 in) long and top-shaped with a papery wing 15–20 mm (0.59–0.79 in) in diameter with a radial slit.

This species of Maireana resembles, and has been mistaken for pearl bluebush ( M. sedifolia) which can be distinguished by its simple hairs, stalkless leaves and paired flowers.

== Taxonomy and naming ==
This species was first formally described in 1951 by Laurie Johnson who gave it the name Kochia astrotricha in Contributions from the New South Wales National Herbarium from specimens collected near Silverton in 1939. In 1975, Paul Wilson transferred the species to Maireana as M. astrotricha in the journal Nuytsia. The specific epithet (astrotricha) refers to the branched hairs on the leaves and stems.

In 1855, Ferdinand von Mueller described Kochia sedifolia in Definitions of rare or hitherto undescribed Australian plants and in 1915 John McConnell Black described Kochia sedifolia var. stellulata in Transactions and Proceedings of the Royal Society of South Australia, but var. stellulata is listed as a synonym of Maireana astrotricha by Plants of the World Online and by the Australian Plant Census.

== Distribution and habitat ==
Maireana astrotricha usually grows in well-drained gravelly or stony soil in open situations. It is found in western New South Wales, central and northern South Australia, south of Alice Springs in the Northern Territory and the south western corner of Queensland. Within western NSW from the Murray to the Queensland border it gradually replaces pearl bluebush (M. sedifolia), becoming more frequent in the north. In South Australia it is found from the Northern Eyre Peninsula across to the eastern and northern borders, but not recorded on the south east or Yorke and Fleurieu peninsula.

Bluebush communities can occur in a terrain from level to gently undulating plains or dunes. M. astrotricha forms communities of one or more species, typically with M. pyramidata. Some contain bladder saltbush (Atriplex vesicaria) and can mix with adjacent A. vesicaria or mulga (Acacia aneura) communities. Bluebush communities are usually found where limestone is present in the soil.

== Ecology ==
Bluebush (Maireana) are slow growing with deep tap roots and extremely drought tolerant. They play an important role in stabilising the landscape as they are long-lived resistant structures. Bluebush retain their leaves during drought, but can survive longer periods of drought through defoliation without killing the plant.

The central netted dragon and Leonhardi's ctenotus use M. astrotricha as a perch and shelter, but do not feed on it. The sleepy lizard uses the closely related pearl bluebush (M. sedifolia) selectively as a daytime refuge from high temperatures, suggesting that bluebush are used in the thermal ecology of some reptiles.

The chestnut-breasted whiteface relies on M. astrotricha for cover and to nest. The cinnamon quail-thrush often associates with the chestnut-breasted whiteface and also uses bluebush for nest sites and cover. The southern whiteface and banded whiteface are also found in bluebush habitat within the range of M. astrotricha. The Flinders Ranges thick-billed grasswren (Amytornis modestus raglessi) is found in M. astrotricha although it is more frequently found in black bluebush (M. pyramidata).

== Reproduction and dispersal ==
M. astrotricha is described as flowering in late spring to summer. However bluebush (Maireana) flowering is sparing, irregular and has been observed throughout the year, usually following rainfall events.

Bluebush dispersal is not well understood. The papery wing of M. astrotricha and pearl bluebush (M. sedifolia) may facilitate wind dispersal, although one study on the similar M. sedifolia found that fruits only dispersed a few metres from the plant. Ants have been observed collecting bluebush fruit, but this may be for food and may not facilitate dispersal.

== Uses ==
Saltbush and bluebush (Maireana) are highly regarded as reserve forage for stock as they offer more protein and digestability than dry herbaceous species. M. astrotricha is more acceptable to stock than pearl bluebush (M. sedifolia).

== Gallery ==
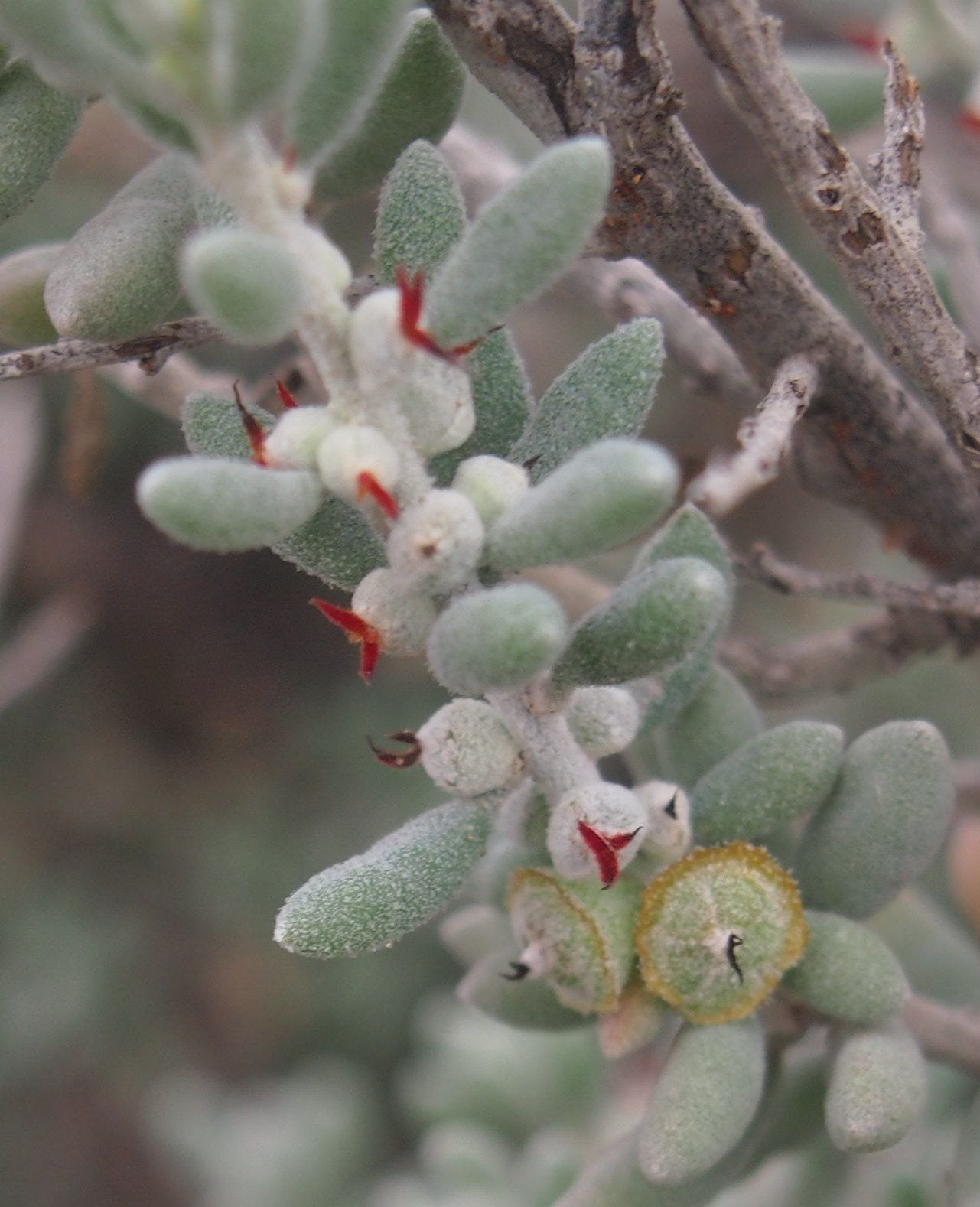
Close-up of flowers

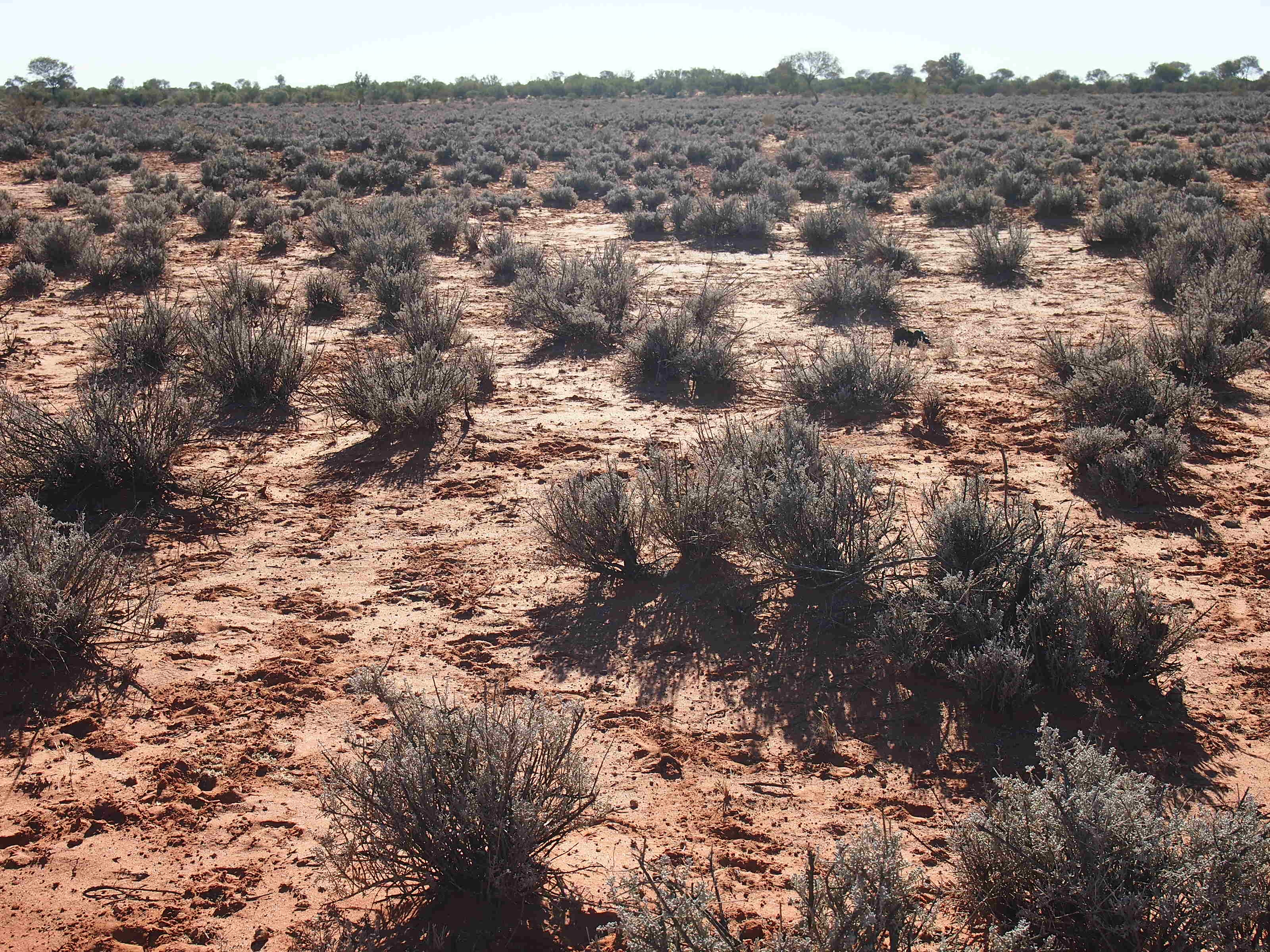
Maireana astrotricha shrubland
