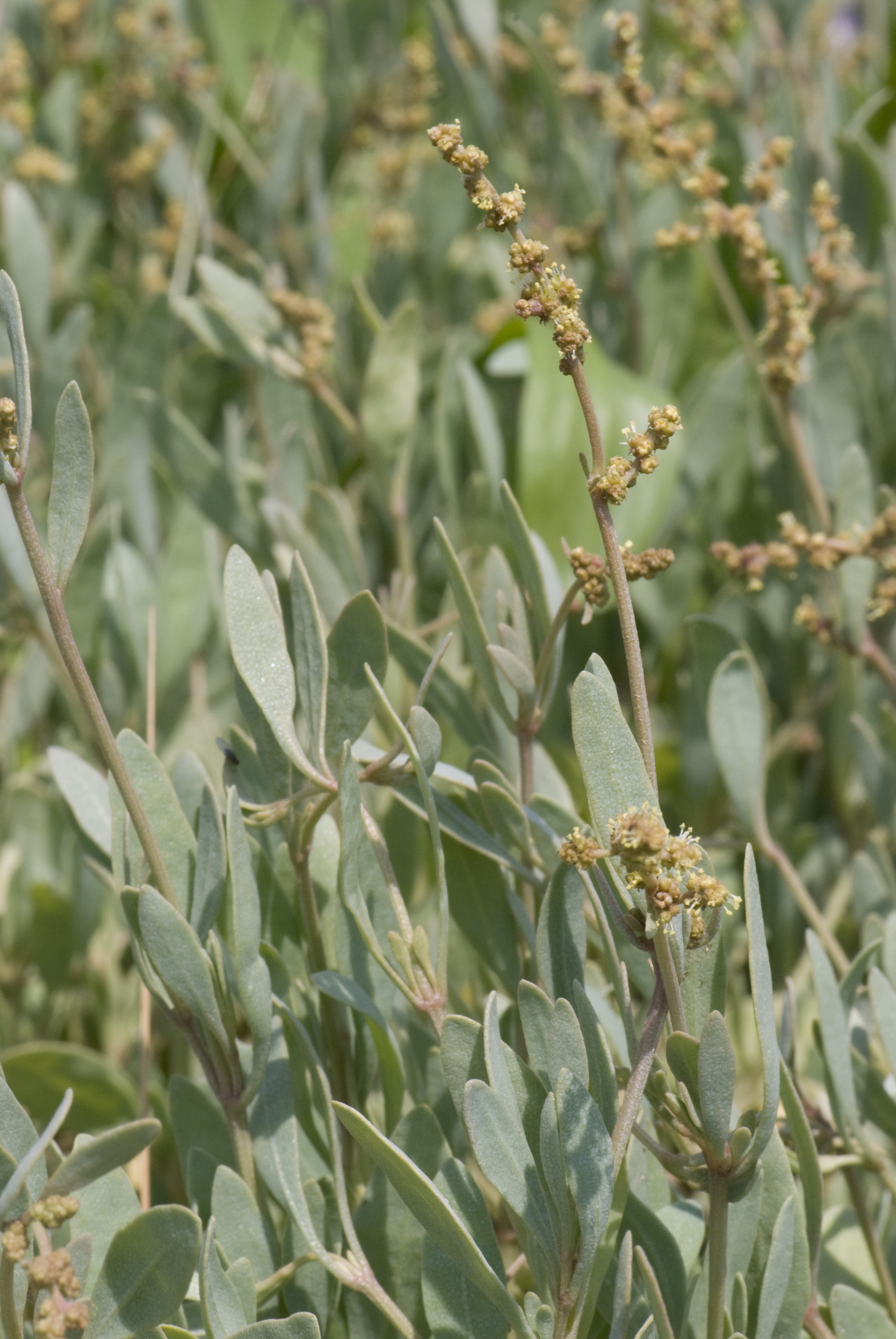
- sea purslane (Halimione portulacoides)

Scientific classification
- Kingdom: Plantae
- Clade: Tracheophytes
- Clade: Angiosperms
- Clade: Eudicots
- Order: Caryophyllales
- Family: Amaranthaceae
- Subfamily: Chenopodioideae
- Tribe: Atripliceae
- Genus: Halimione; Aellen

Synonyms
- Halimus Wallr. (nom. illeg.)

= Halimione =

Genus of flowering plants

Halimione is a plant genus from the subfamily Chenopodioideae of the family Amaranthaceae. It is a sister genus of Atriplex and is included in that genus by Plants of the World Online.

== Description ==
The species in genus Halimione are annual or perennial herbs with silvery grey stems and leaves. Their stems grow prostrate, ascending or erect. The leaves are opposite in lower part and alternate in upper part of the plants. The leaf blade is oblong with entire margins.

Plants are monoecious. The spicate inflorescences consist of inconspicuous flowers. Male flowers comprise 4-5 perianth segments and 4-5 stamens. Female flowers have 2 totally concrescent, three-lobed bracteoles which enclose the ovary, a perianth is missing.

The pericarp is tightly adherent to the inner side of the bracteoles, and also tightly adherent to the seed. The seed is vertically orientated, with a thin, membraneous seed coat. It is anatomically different from Atriplex (which has a brownish, thick and hard seed coat).

Halimione pedunculata and Halimione verrucifera have a chromosome number of 2n = 18, Halimione portulacoides 2n = 36.

== Systematics ==
The genus has been first described in 1822 as Halimus by Karl Friedrich Wallroth (in Schedulae Criticae, p. 117). But this name was illegitimate, as there existed already Halimus Patrick Browne (1756) in family Portulacaceae. Paul Aellen replaced this illegitimate name by the valid name Halimione in 1938 (in: Verhandlungen der Naturforschenden Gesellschaft in Basel, 49, p. 121). Type species is Halimione pedunculata (L.) Aellen.

During the following years, Halimione has sometimes been included in Atriplex. Molecular phylogenetic research by Kadereit et al. (2010) revealed that Halimione is a sister genus of Atriplex. A 2019 study reached the same conclusion.

Halimione comprises 3 species in 2 sections:

- Halimione section Halimione, with one species:
  - Halimione pedunculata (L.) Aellen (Syn.: Atriplex pedunculata L.): A halophyte from western Europe to western Asia and the Black Sea.
- Halimione section Halimus (S.F.Gray) Sukhor., with 2 species:
  - Halimione portulacoides (L.) Aellen (Syn.: Atriplex portulacoides L.), sea purslane: at the sea shores of western and southern Europe, the mediterranean shores of North Africa to western Asia.
  - Halimione verrucifera (M.Bieb.) Aellen (Syn.: Atriplex verrucifera M.Bieb.): From eastern and southeast Europe (Romania, Ukraine) to Southwest Asia and Central Asia to China (Xinjiang)

== Distribution ==
Halimione is distributed in Europe, North Africa, and Asia, ranging from Southwest Asia, and Central Asia to China (Xinjiang).
