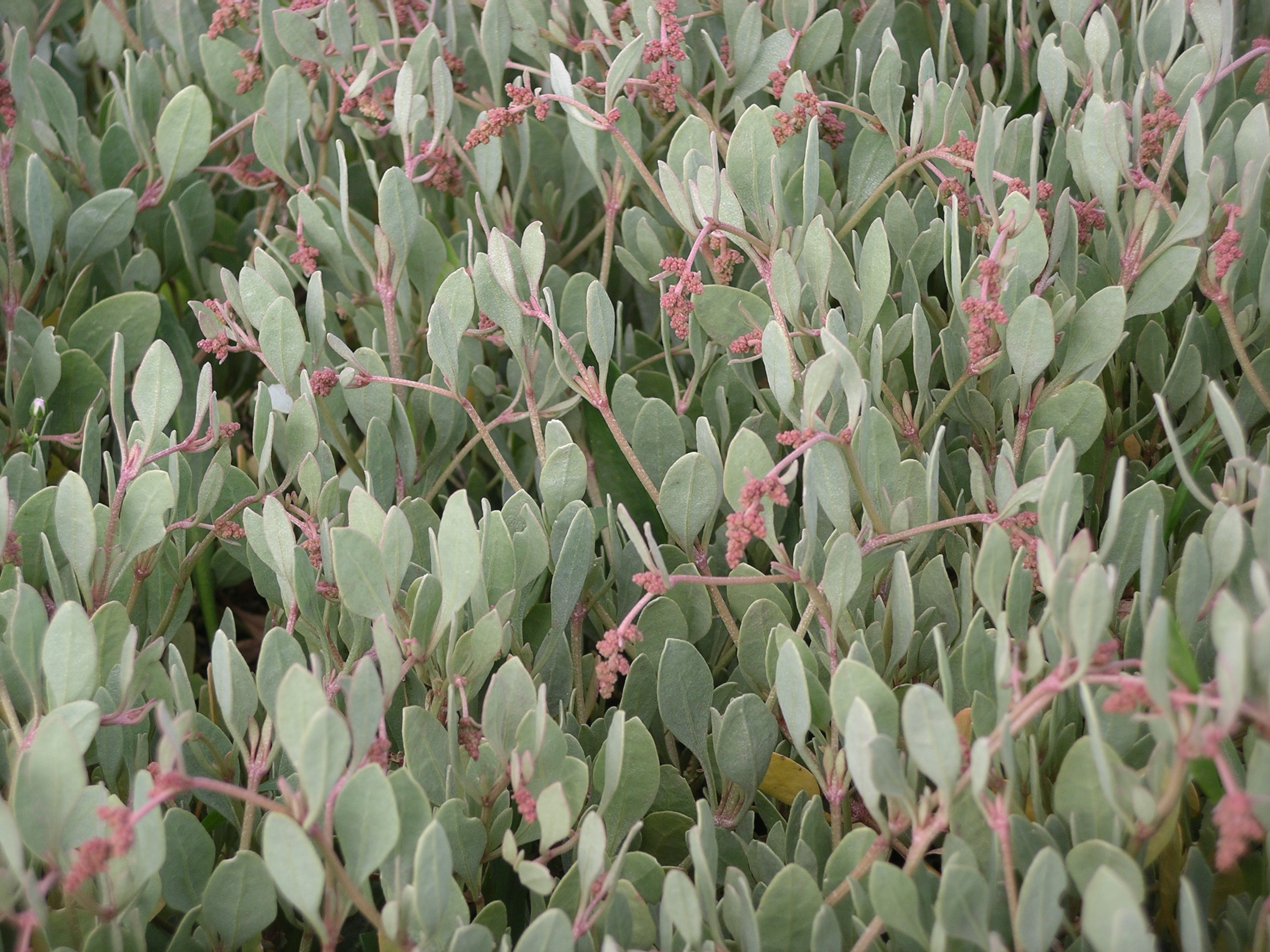

Scientific classification
- Kingdom: Plantae
- Clade: Embryophytes
- Clade: Tracheophytes
- Clade: Spermatophytes
- Clade: Angiosperms
- Clade: Eudicots
- Order: Caryophyllales
- Family: Amaranthaceae
- Genus: Halimione
- Species: H. portulacoides

Binomial name
- Halimione portulacoides (L.) Aellen

= Halimione portulacoides =

Species of flowering plant

Halimione portulacoides, commonly known as sea purslane, is a shrub found in Eurasia.

== Description ==
The perennial plant grows to 1 metre (3 1/2 feet) in height. The leaves are thick and oval-shaped, with a powdery surface. In northern temperate climates it flowers from July to September. The flowers are small, borne in short clusters, monoecious, and pollinated by wind.

== Taxonomy ==
Botanical synonyms include Atriplex portulacoides L. and Obione portulacoides (L.) Moq. Recent phylogenetic research revealed that Halimione is a distinct genus and cannot be included in Atriplex.

== Distribution and habitat ==
Halimione portulacoides occurs at the sea shores of western and southern Europe, and from the Mediterranean Sea to western Asia. A halophyte, it is found in salt marshes and coastal dunes, and is usually flooded at high tide.

== Uses ==
The edible leaves can be eaten raw in salads or cooked as a potherb. They are thick and succulent with a crunchy texture and a natural saltiness. The leaves are good for human and animal health as they contain important micronutrients like zinc, iron, copper, and cobalt.
