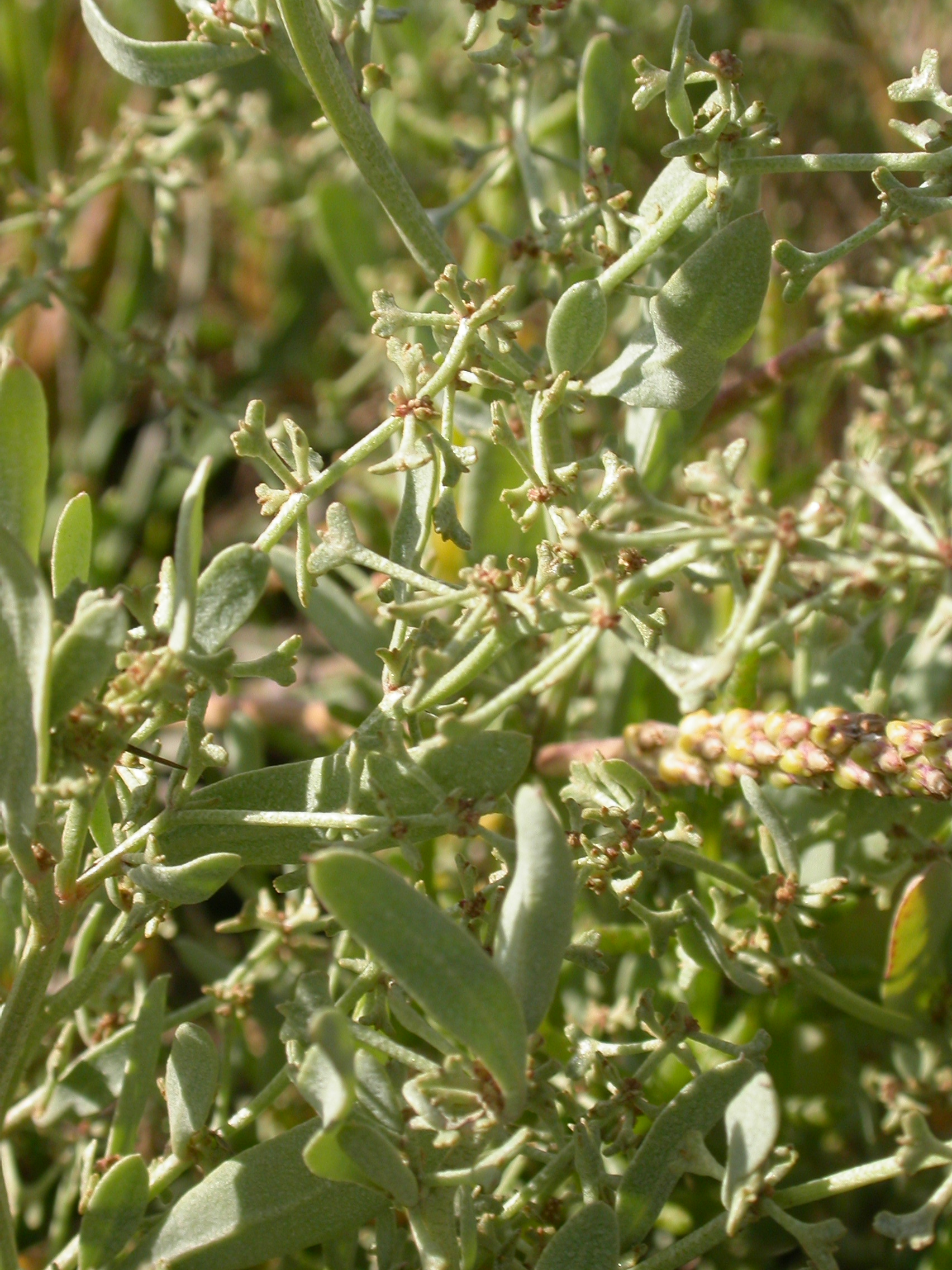

Scientific classification
- Kingdom: Plantae
- Clade: Tracheophytes
- Clade: Angiosperms
- Clade: Eudicots
- Order: Caryophyllales
- Family: Amaranthaceae
- Genus: Halimione
- Species: H. pedunculata

Binomial name
- Halimione pedunculata (L.) Aellen

Synonyms
- Atriplex pedunculata L.; Halimus pedunculatus (L.) Wallr.; Obione pendunculata (L.) Moq.

= Halimione pedunculata =

Species of flowering plant

Halimione pedunculata, the pedunculate sea-purslane, is an annual plant occurring on salty sandy grounds along the seashore. It grows with a standing herbaceous stem up to 30 cm high. The leaves are long and spade shaped. The stipules are triangle shaped to oppositely heart shaped, without spikes, with long petioles.
