= Atriplex vesicaria subsp. variabilis =

Scientific classification
- Kingdom: Plantae
- Clade: Tracheophytes
- Clade: Angiosperms
- Clade: Eudicots
- Order: Caryophyllales
- Family: Amaranthaceae
- Genus: Atriplex
- Species: A. vesicaria
- Subspecies: A. v. subsp. variabilis

Trinomial name
- Atriplex vesicaria subsp. variabilis Parr-Sm.

Subspecies of plant

Atriplex vesicaria subsp. variabilis is subspecies of bladder saltbush endemic to Australia.

== Description ==
It grows as an erect shrub up to a metre high. Leaves are oval in shape, with entire margins, ten to 15 millimetres long, and 4 to 6 millimetres wide.

== Taxonomy ==
The species was first published by Geoffrey Parr-Smith in Paul G. Wilson's 1984 treatment of the genus for the Flora of Australia series.

== Distribution and habitat ==
It grows in loam and clay, on coastal dunes and salt lakes; it has a fairly wide distribution, occurring in South Australia, the Northern Territory and Western Australia.
