= Mount Lyndhurst Important Bird Area =

Important Bird Area in South Australia

Coordinates: 30°11′31″S 138°38′05″E

Location of the Mount Lyndhurst Important Bird Area in South Australia

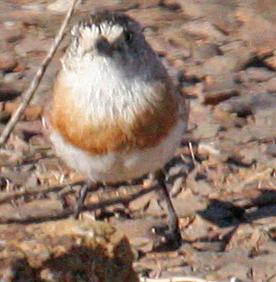
The IBA is an important site for chestnut-breasted whitefaces

Mount Lyndhurst Important Bird Area comprises a 93 km^{2} part of Mount Lyndhurst Station, a pastoral lease lying on the north-west margin of the Flinders Ranges, about 30 km east of the town of Lyndhurst, South Australia. It is accessible via the Strzelecki Track.

== Description ==
The extent of the Important Bird Area (IBA) is defined as all habitat suitable for chestnut-breasted whitefaces on Mount Lyndhurst Station. The habitat consists of low hills covered by gibber and shingle rock, forming a bare, stony surface dissected by numerous drainage lines. It also supports patches of low, open shrubland, mainly of low bluebush, bladder saltbush and other chenopods, with a sparse scattering of larger emu bushes and wattles. The climate is arid with hot summers and mild, dry winters. Mean maximum temperatures range from 35.5 °C in January to 17.3 °C in July. Mean minimum temperatures range from 20 °C in February to 4.1 °C in July. Mean annual rainfall is 165.6 mm.

== Criteria for nomination as an IBA ==
The site has been identified by BirdLife International as an IBA because it contains the largest known population of the chestnut-breasted whitefaces within the eastern part of its range. It also supports populations of inland dotterels, thick-billed grasswrens, banded whitefaces, black and pied honeyeaters, gibberbirds, chirruping wedgebills and cinnamon quail-thrushes.

== See also ==
- List of birds of South Australia
