= Phambra =

- Village
- Location in Punjab, India Phambra (India)
- Coordinates: 31.0356895°N 75.996015°E
- Country: India
- State: Punjab
- District: Shaheed Bhagat Singh Nagar

Government
  - Type: Panchayat raj
  - Body: Gram panchayat
- Elevation: 254 m (833 ft)

Population (2011)
  - Total: 824
- Sex ratio 424/400 ♂/♀

Languages
  - Official: Punjabi
- Time zone: UTC+5:30 (IST)
- PIN: 144417
- Telephone code: 01823
- ISO 3166 code: IN-PB
- Post office: Aur (S.O)
- Website: nawanshahr.nic.in

Phambra is a village in Shaheed Bhagat Singh Nagar district of the Indian state of Punjab, 4 kilometres (2.5 mi) from sub post office Aur, 9.4 kilometres (5.8 mi) from district headquarters Shaheed Bhagat Singh Nagar and 106 kilometres (66 mi) from state capital Chandigarh. The village is administrated by an elected sarpanch.

== Demography ==
As of 2011, Phambra has a total number of 156 houses and population of 824 of which 424 include are males while 400 are females according to the report published by Census India in 2011. The literacy rate of Phambra is 76.87% higher than the state average of 75.84%. The population of children under the age of 6 years is 102 which is 12.38% of total population of Phambra, and child sex ratio is approximately 855 as compared to Punjab state average of 846.

Most of the people are from Schedule Caste which constitutes 47.82% of total population in Phambra. The town does not have any Schedule Tribe population so far.

As per the report published by Census India in 2011, 264 people were engaged in work activities out of the total population of Phambra which includes 233 males and 31 females. According to census survey report 2011, 93.94% workers describe their work as main work and 6.06% workers are involved in Marginal activity providing livelihood for less than 6 months.

== Education ==
The village has a Punjabi language co-ed primary school established in 1975.

== See also ==
- List of villages in India
