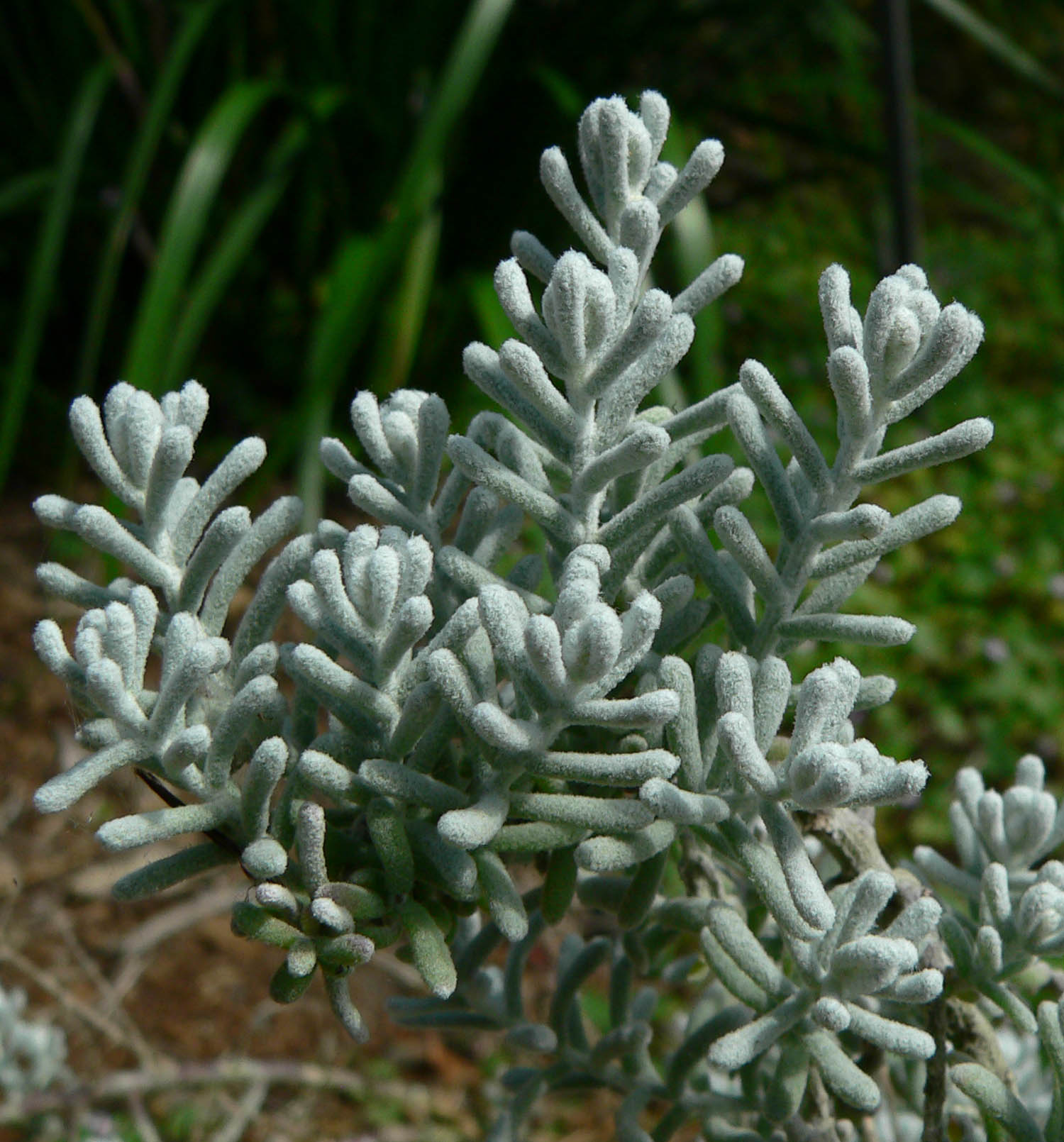

Scientific classification
- Kingdom: Plantae
- Clade: Tracheophytes
- Clade: Angiosperms
- Clade: Eudicots
- Order: Caryophyllales
- Family: Amaranthaceae
- Genus: Maireana
- Species: M. sedifolia

Binomial name
- Maireana sedifolia (F.Muell.) Paul G.Wilson

Synonyms
- Kochia sedifolia F.Muell. nom. inval., nom. nud.; Kochia sedifolia F.Muell.; Kochia sedifolia F.Muell. isonym; Kochia sedifolia F.Muell. var. sedifolia

= Maireana sedifolia =

Species of plant

Maireana sedifolia, also known as pearl bluebush, pearl saltbush, hoary bluebush, is a species of flowering plant in the family Amaranthaceae and is endemic to arid parts of inland Australia. It is a compact, widely branching shrub with fleshy, narrowly egg-shaped leaves, pairs of densely woolly bisexual flowers, and a firm, thin-walled fruiting perianth with a papery, horizontal wing.

== Description ==
Maireana sedifolia is a compact, widely-branched, dioecious shrub that typically grows to a height of about 1 m (3 ft 3 in) and is covered with bluish grey, woolly hairs. Its leaves are arranged alternately, narrowly egg-shaped with the narrower end towards the base, 4–8 mm (0.16–0.31 in) long with a rounded tip. The flowers are arranged in pairs, closely woolly, with usually only one maturing, the male flower hemispherical and the female spherical. The fruiting perianth is straw coloured or pale brown when dry, and the tube is hemispherical to top-shaped, about 2 mm (0.079 in) high and 2–3 mm (0.079–0.118 in) wide at the top, firm but thin-walled except for a thick base. The wing is horizontal, papery and glabrous with a single slit.

== Taxonomy ==
This species was first described in 1855 by Ferdinand von Mueller who gave it the name Kochia sedifolia in his book Definitions of rare or hitherto undescribed Australian plants. In 1975, Paul Graham Wilson reassigned the species to Maireana as M. sedifolia in the journal Nuytsia. The specific epithet (sedifolia) means 'Sedum-leaved'.

== Distribution and habitat ==
Maireana sedifolia often grows in calcareous soil and is found in south-western New South Wales, north-western Victoria, South Australia, southern Northern Territory and south-eastern Western Australia.
