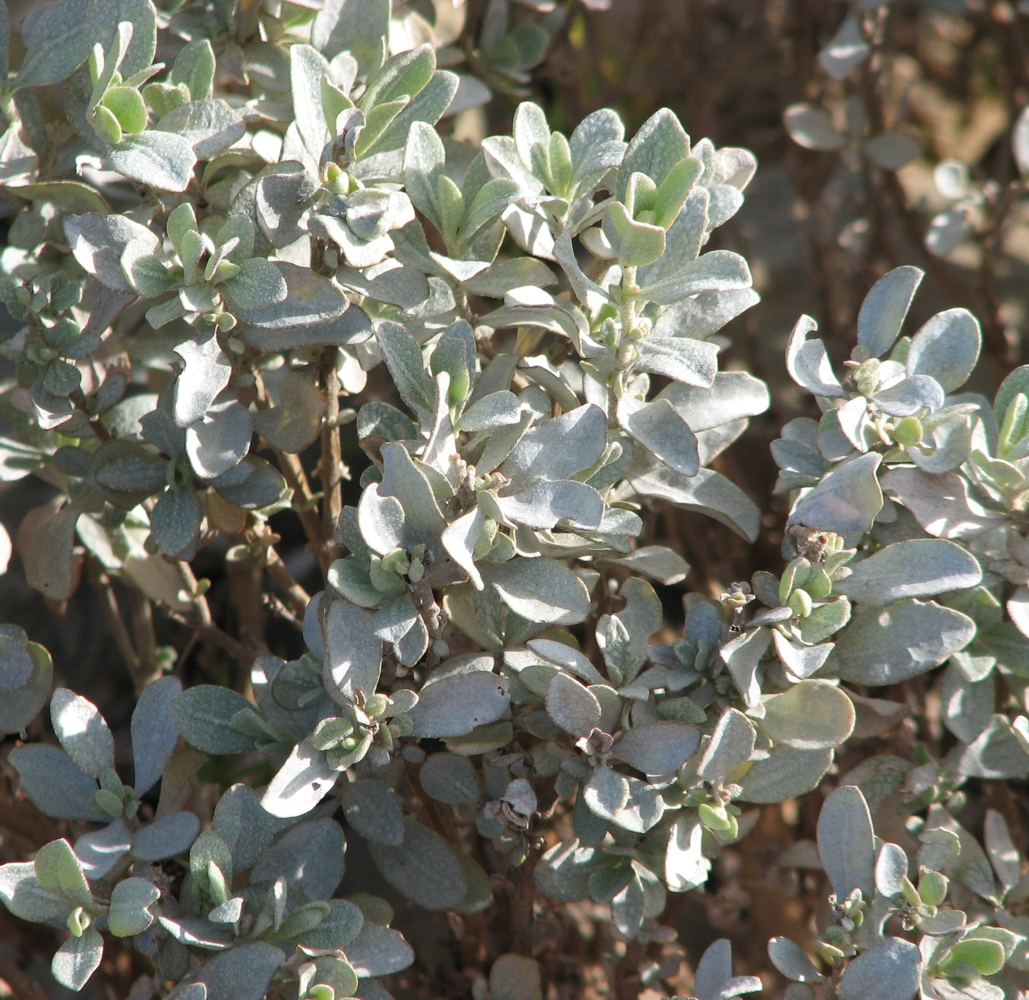

Scientific classification
- Kingdom: Plantae
- Clade: Embryophytes
- Clade: Tracheophytes
- Clade: Spermatophytes
- Clade: Angiosperms
- Clade: Eudicots
- Order: Caryophyllales
- Family: Amaranthaceae
- Genus: Atriplex
- Species: A. vesicaria

Binomial name
- Atriplex vesicaria Heward ex Benth.
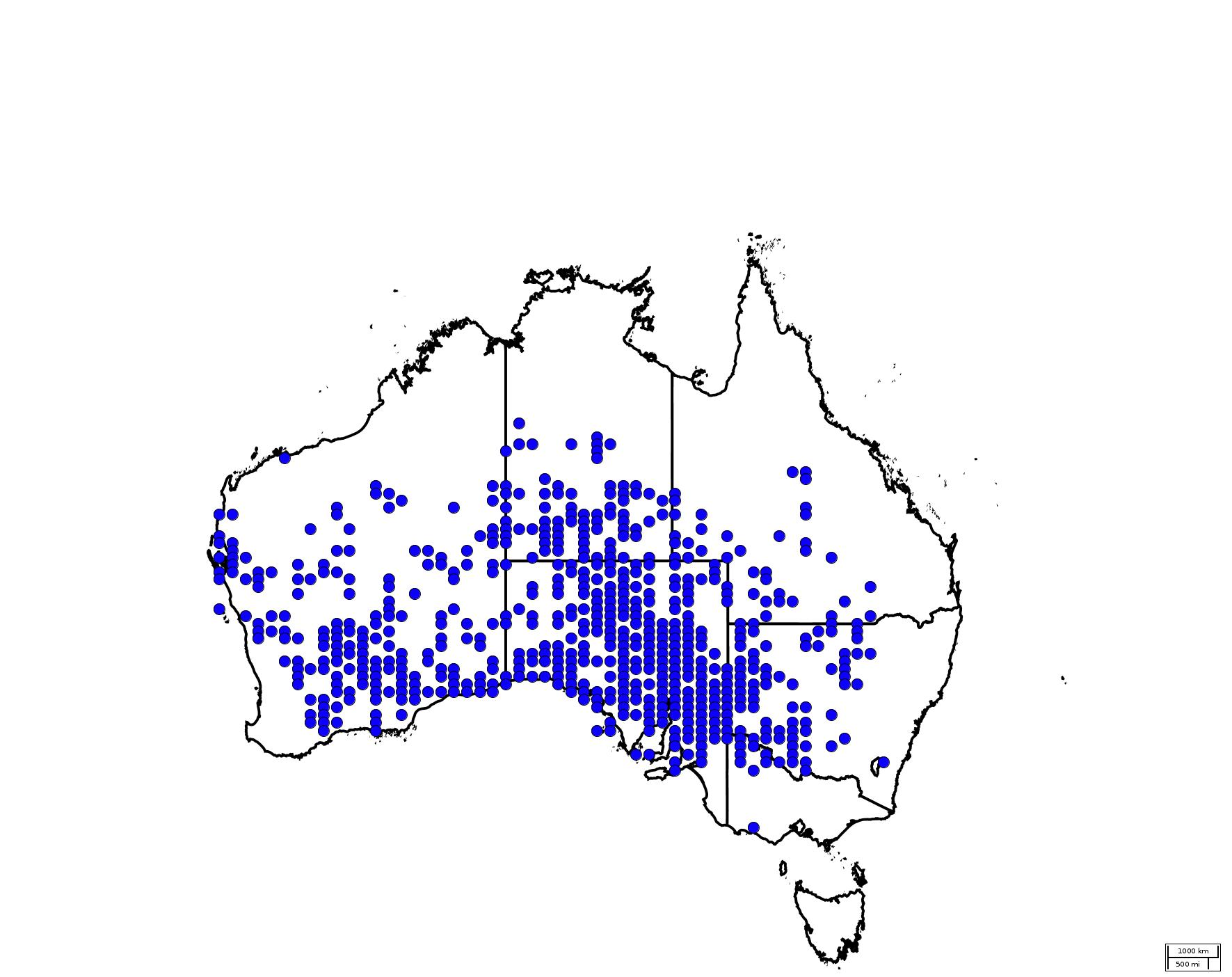
- Occurrence data from AVH

Synonyms
- Pachypharynx neglecta Aellen

= Atriplex vesicaria =

Bladder saltbush

Species of plant

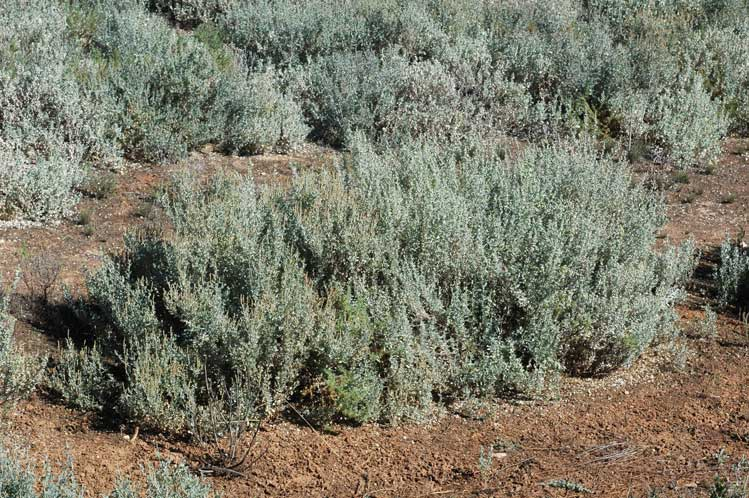
Habit (subsp. macrocystidia) near Balranald

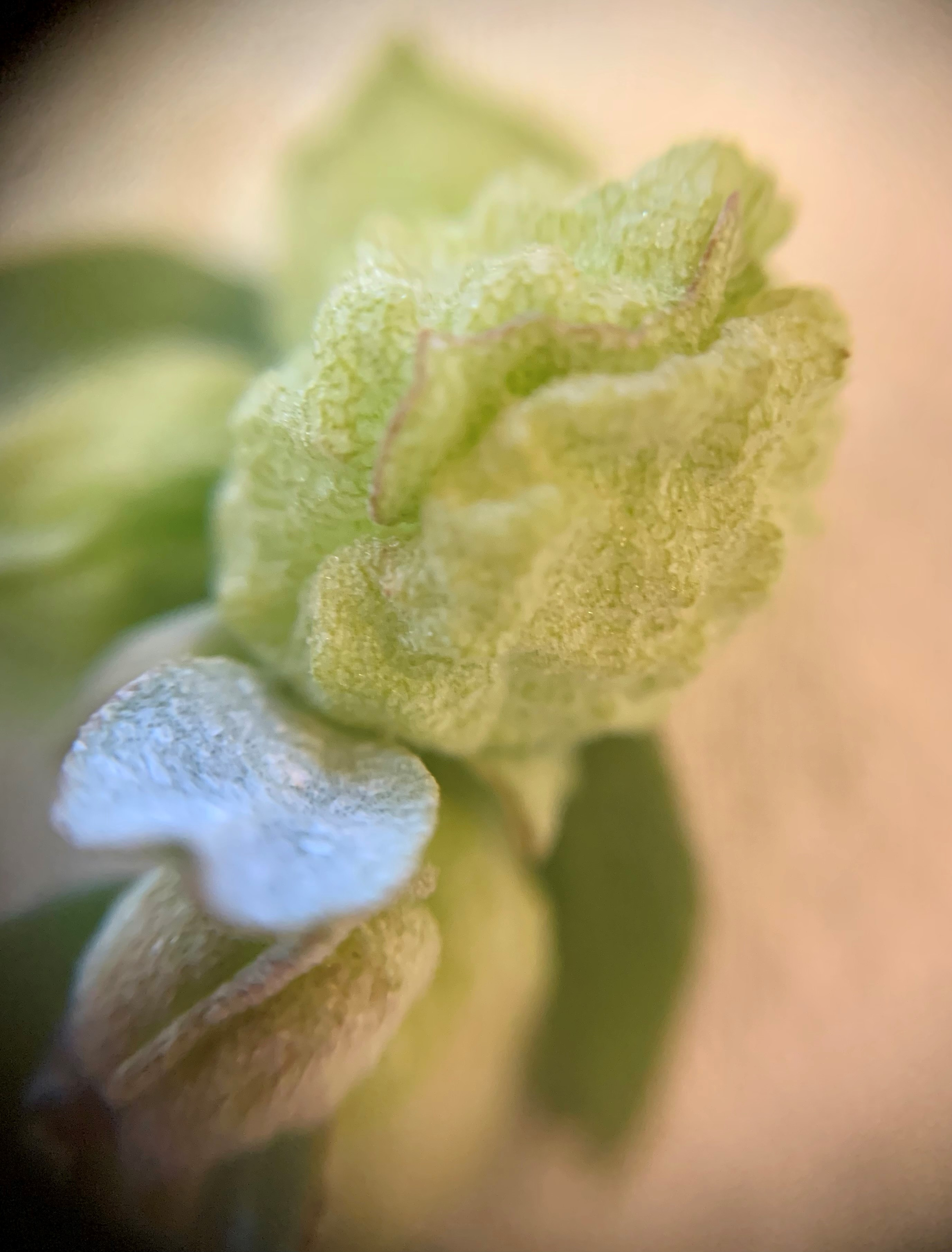
A macro image of an Atriplex vesicaria fruit and leaf

Atriplex vesicaria, commonly known as bladder saltbush, is a species of flowering plant of the family Amaranthaceae and is endemic to arid and semi-arid inland regions of Australia. It is an upright or sprawling shrub with scaly leaves and separate male and female plants, the fruit often with a bladder-like appendage.

== Description ==
Atriplex vesicaria grows as an upright or sprawling, perennial shrub up to 1 m (3 ft 3 in) high. The leaves are sessile, elliptic to oblong or egg-shaped with the narrower end towards the base, 5–25 mm (0.20–0.98 in) long, 3–15 mm (0.12–0.59 in) wide and scaly. The edges of the leaves are entire, occasionally toothed, with the leaf tips pointed or blunt.

Male and female flowers are usually borne on separate plants. Male plants usually bear flowers in clusters on simple or branched panicles or spikes 20–40 mm (0.79–1.57 in) long, the flowers with five similar perianth segments. Female flowers are borne in clusters of two to many in upper leaf axils and lack a perianth, the ovary surrounded by two bracteoles. After flowering, the bracteoles swell to 3–14 mm (0.12–0.55 in) long and 5–15 mm (0.20–0.59 in) wide, and usually have a thin-walled, bladder-like appendage attached.

== Taxonomy ==
Atriplex vesicaria was first formally described in 1870 by George Bentham in Flora Australiensis from an unpublished manuscript by Robert Heward. The specific epithet (vesicaria) means "bladder-like" or "inflated", referring to the appendages on the fruiting bodies. The name 'Atriplex' is from the Latin atriplexum, meaning orache, a plant used as a spinach substitute.

In 1938, Paul Aellen described Pachypharynx neglecta in Botanische Jahrbücher für Systematik, Pflanzengeschichte und Pflanzengeographie, but the name is considered a synonym by the Australian Plant Census.

In 1984, Geoffrey A. Parr-Smith described eight subspecies of A. vesicaria in the Flora of Australia and the names are accepted by the Australian Plant Census:

- Atriplex vesicaria subsp. appendiculata (Benth.) Parr-Sm.
- Atriplex vesicaria subsp. calcicola Parr-Sm.
- Atriplex vesicaria subsp. incompta Parr-Sm.
- Atriplex vesicaria subsp. macrocystidia Parr-Sm.
- Atriplex vesicaria subsp. minor (Aellen) Parr-Sm.
- Atriplex vesicaria subsp. sphaerocarpa Parr-Sm.
- Atriplex vesicaria subsp. variabilis Parr-Sm.
- Atriplex vesicaria Heward ex Benth.subsp. vesicaria

== Distribution and habitat ==
Atriplex vesicaria is a widespread shrub that occurs across chenopod shrublands in arid and semi-arid inland areas across southern Australia, in Western Australia, Northern Territory, South Australia, Queensland, New South Wales, and Victoria. This species grows on alluvial plains, coastal dunes, salt pans, salt lakes, sandy plains and limestone ridges.

In New South Wales, A. vesicaria occurs over clay soils on the Riverine Plains in the west, stony soils in the north west, and on texture-contrast soils in the south west. In Victoria, A. vesicaria occurs in the Lowan Mallee, Murray Mallee, Victorian Volcanic Plain, Murray Scroll Belt, and the Robinvale Plains.

== Ecology and reproduction ==
Bladder saltbush is relatively long-lived, with a 25-30 year lifespan. Over large areas, it can occur as the sole shrub species or as a co-dominant shrub with other perennial shrubs.

Although hermaphroditic variations with bisexual flowers have been recorded, the A. vesicaria is predominantly dioecious, with male and female flowers occurring on separate plants. Male flowers appear continuously or interrupted in clusters on thin, simple or branched terminal spikes or panicles. Female flowers are axillary, occurring solitary or in clusters of two or more in the leaf axils. The fruiting body is 6-15 millimetres in diameter, green to cream coloured, mostly orbicular and membranous, with fine veins networked throughout and concealed by inflated spongy appendages, with seeds held between bracts.

This species is halophytic, able to withstand salty soils, and is adapted to dry environments. In dry conditions, this plant will shed its leaves to retain moisture.

In favourable conditions, particularly after rainfall, recruitment occurs opportunistically. Flowering and seed set-in can occur several times a year. Male and female flowers are carried on separate plants: however, some plants are bisexual. A vesicaria can alter its sexual state from one season to the next, with sexual expression occurring in response to weather, light intensity, temperature, soil fertility and moisture, disease, age, injury and grazing intensity, and population density.

== Conservation status ==
Atriplex vesicaria is not currently listed under the IUCN, however it is listed as "not threatened" by the Western Australia Department of Biodiversity, Conservation and Attractions. A paper published in 1989 suggested that recovery of the species from saltbush dieback may be attributed to mismanagement of some stands.

== Uses ==
=== Indigenous ===
Indigenous Australians have traditionally used the seeds and leaves of Saltbush, typically the species, Atriplex nummularia, commonly known as Old Man, Bluegreen or Giant Saltbush. The seeds are ground and used in damper, and the leaves are sometimes eaten fresh or added to meat.

=== Agricultural ===
Atriplex vesicaria is of agricultural importance for livestock grazing, predominantly sheep grazing; however, the female plants are preferentially grazed over male plants that are not as palatable due to a chemical deterrent. Studies have shown that sex ratios are altered under the cumulative effects of preferential grazing. The species is sensitive to grazing pressures and can experience heavy defoliation in periods of low rainfall when other perennial shrubs are unavailable. Known for its drought and saline tolerance, the presence of this species is also considered a reliable indicator of pasture conditions.

=== Food ===
Saltbush is currently considered somewhat of a delicacy and used in modern cuisine. It is known for its salty, earthy, herbal flavour and can be added to meat and vegetable dishes or used as a salt substitute.

== Image gallery ==
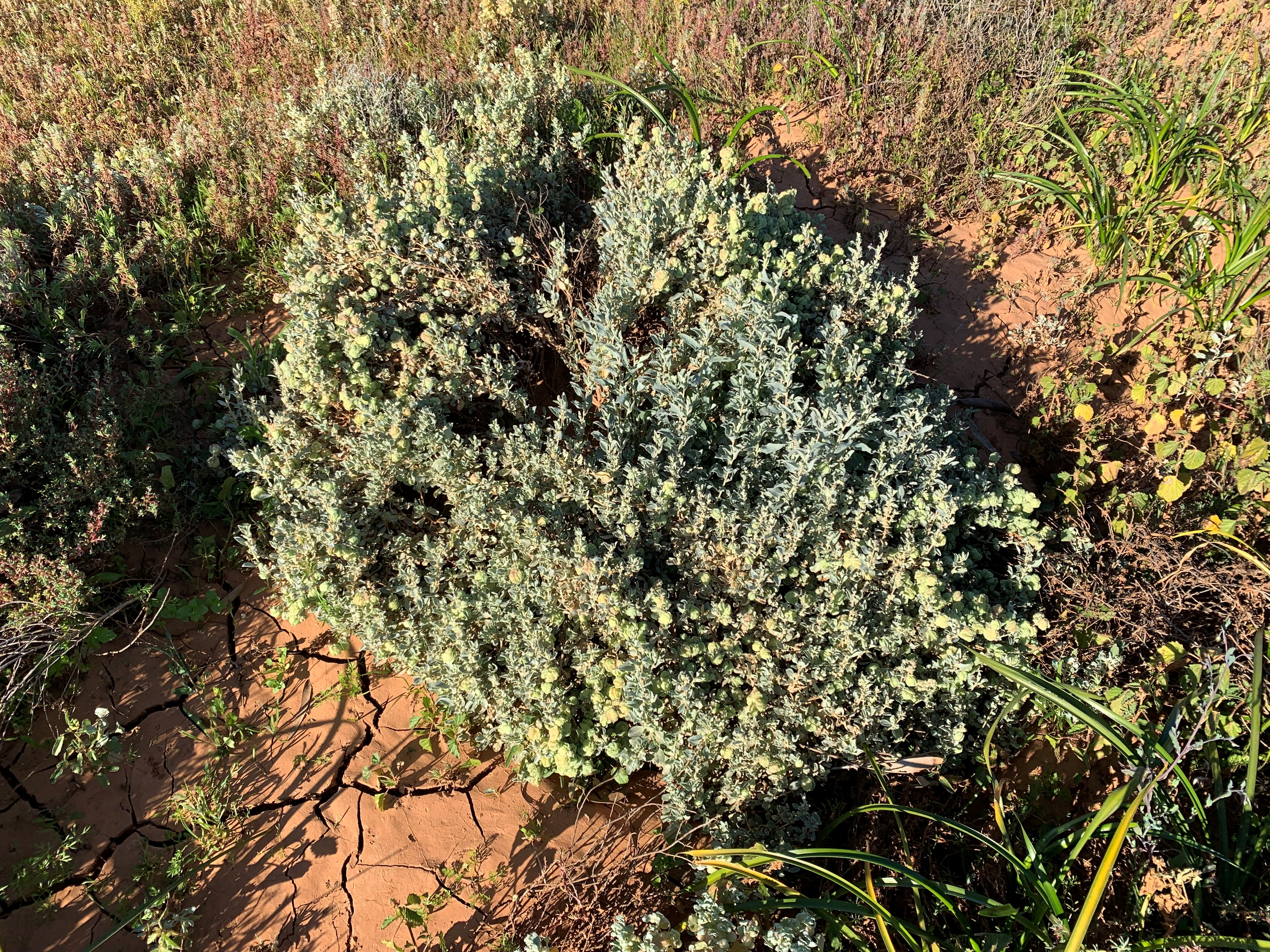
Atriplex vesicaria shrub in cracking clay. Stud Creek, Sturt National Park, NSW

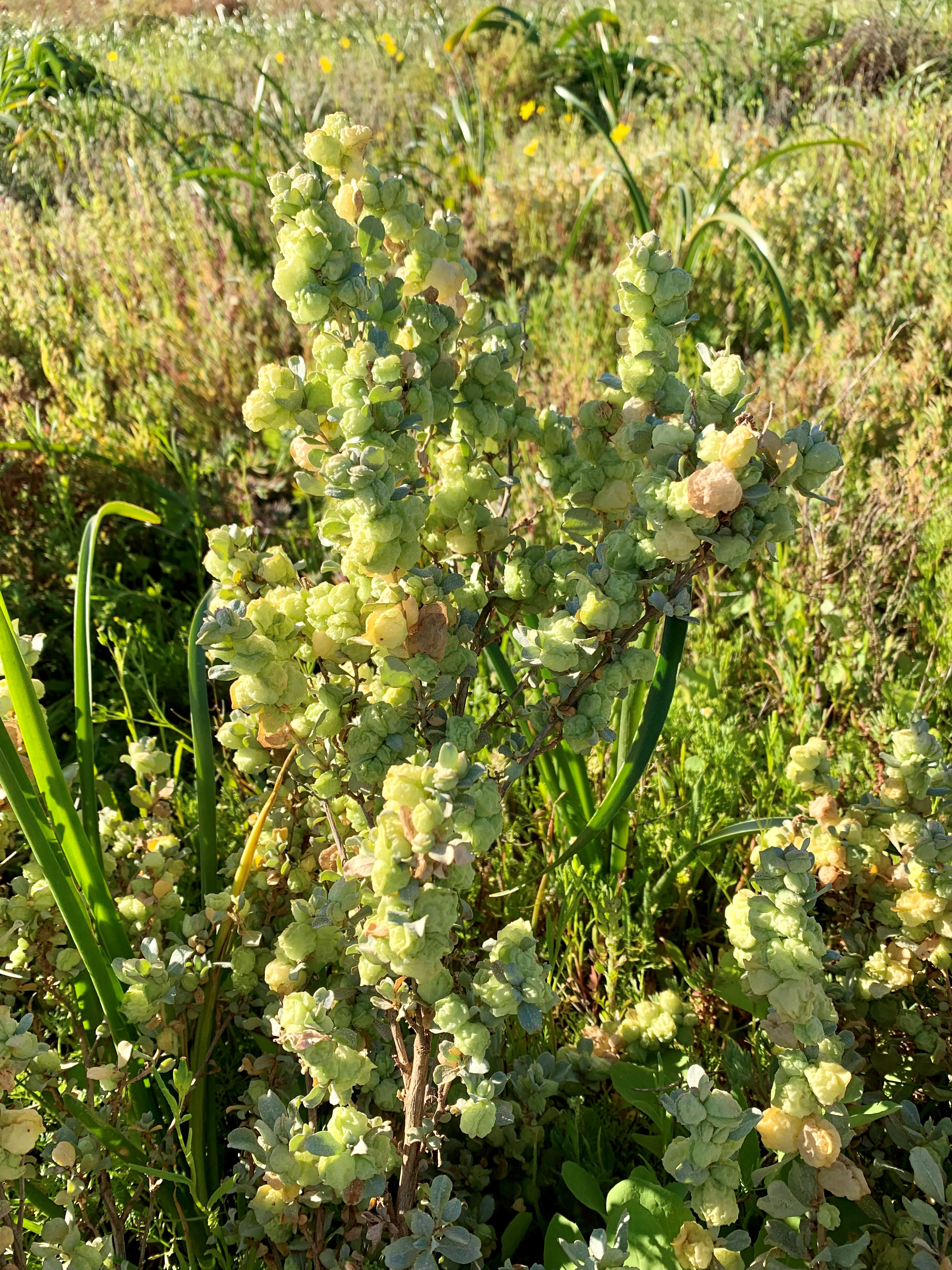
Abundant fruits on the Atriplex vesicaria

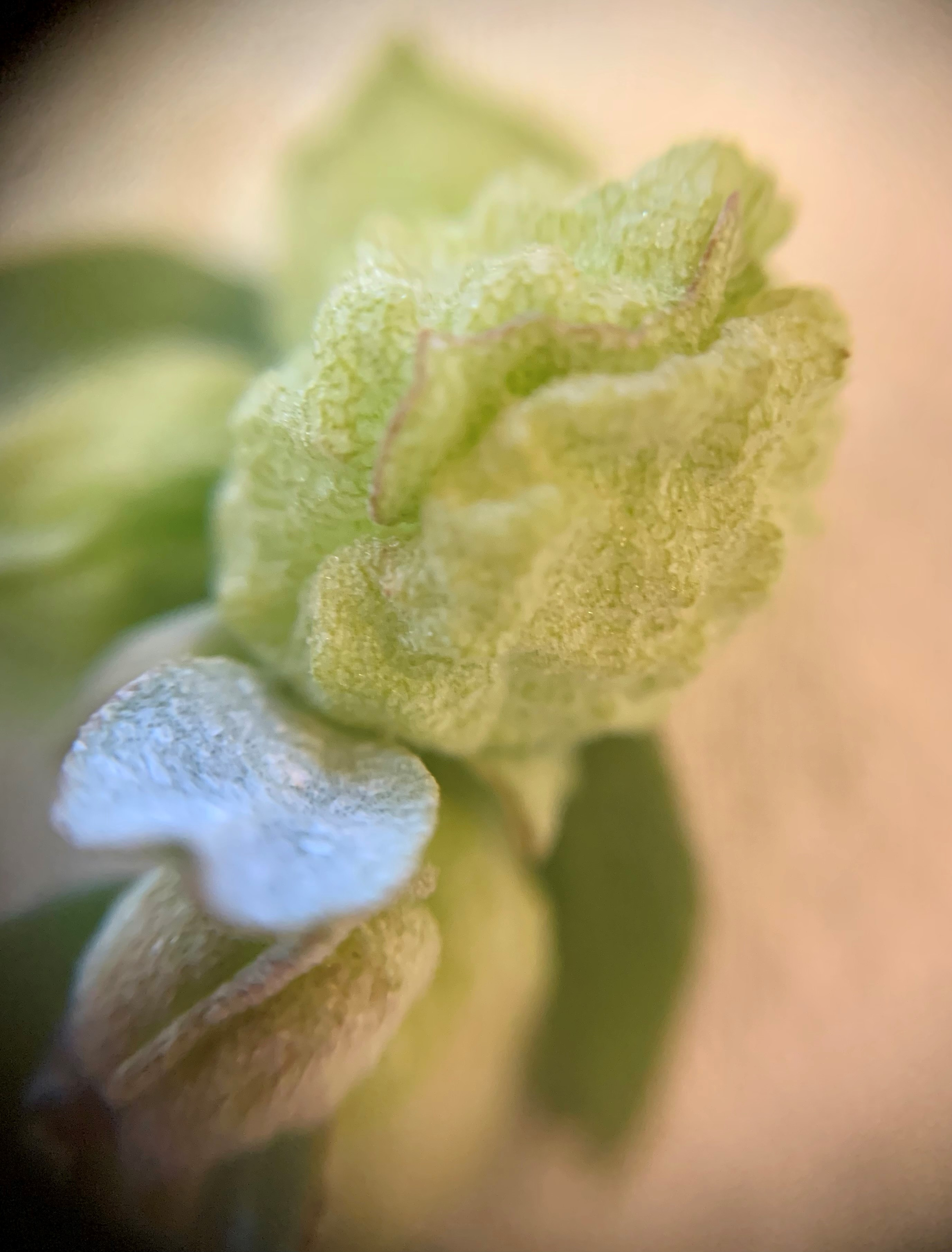
A macro image of an Atriplex vesicaria fruit and leaf

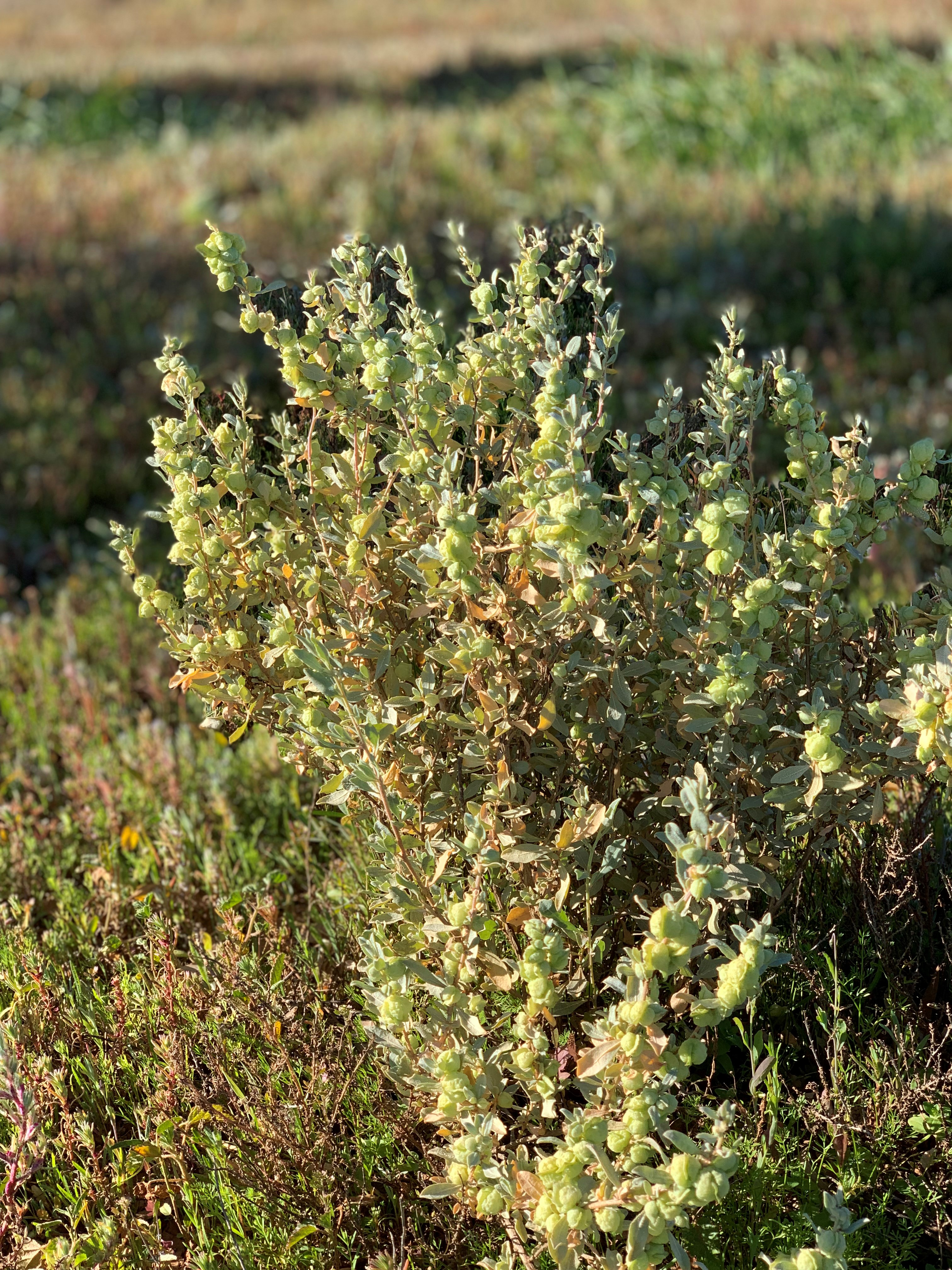
Atriplex vesicaria shrub displaying fruiting bodies

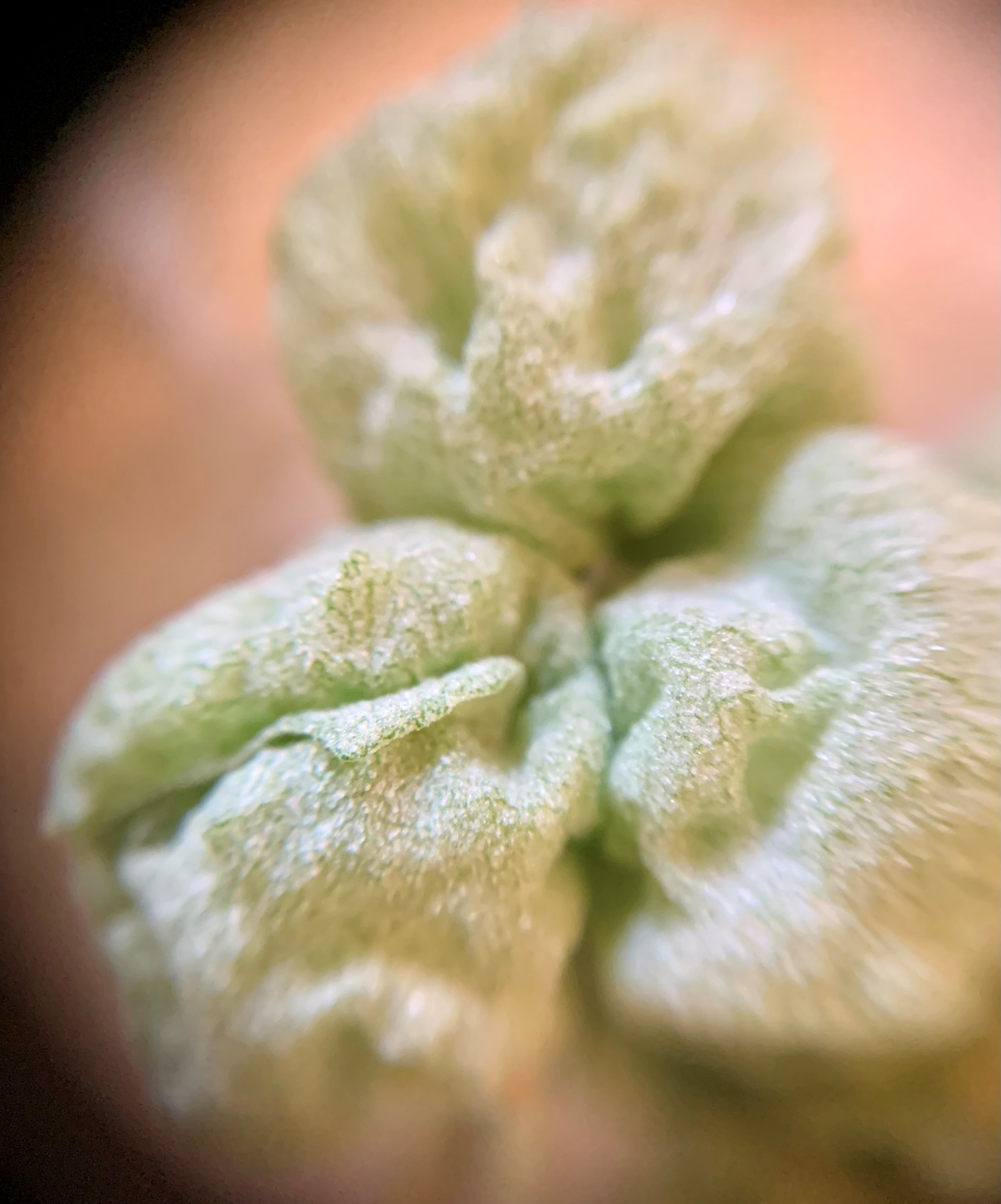
A macro image of Atriplex vesicaria fruits

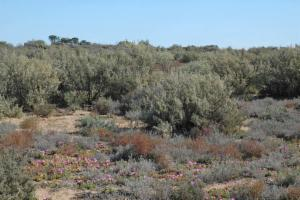
A group of Atriplex vesicaria shrubs

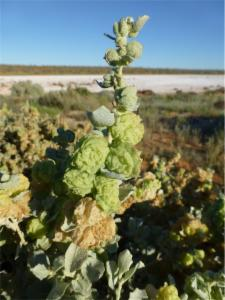
Fruiting bodies of Atriplex vesicaria subsp. macrocystidia

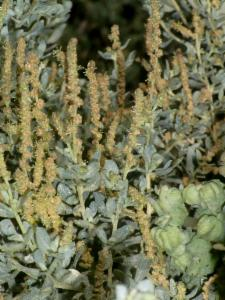
Flowers and fruiting bodies of Atriplex vesicaria subsp. macrocystidia

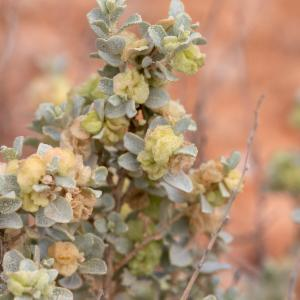
Branches and leaves of the Atriplex vesicaria

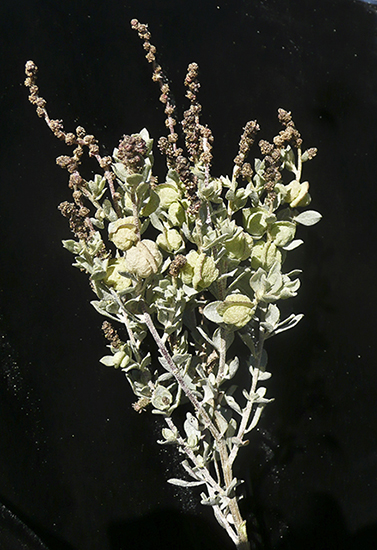
Atriplex vesicaria displaying male flowers and fruit

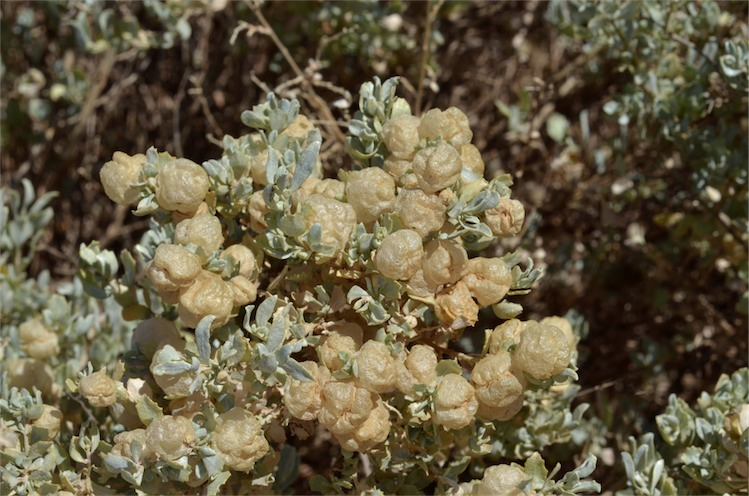
Clusters of fruiting bodies on the Atriplex vesicaria

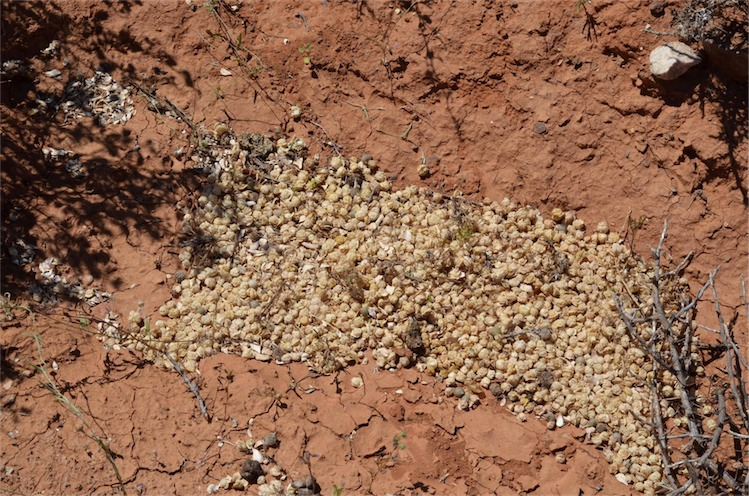
Remnant fruiting bodies from an Atriplex vesicaria shrub

== See also ==
Soil-Surface Characteristics, Microtopography and Proximity to Mature Shrubs: Effects on Survival of Several Cohorts of Atriplex Vesicaria Seedlings

Survival of saltbush (Atriplex vesicaria) seedlings in heavily grazed experimental plots

Low seed availability may limit recruitment in grazed Atriplex vesicaria and contribute to its local extinction
