= Paul Aellen =

Swiss botanist (1896–1973)

- Born: 1896
- Died: 1973 (aged 76–77)
- Scientific career
- Fields: botany

Paul Aellen (1896–1973) was a Swiss botanist, teacher, and plant collector. He specialized in the Amaranthaceae and the flora of Western Asia, and contributed to the Flora Iranica project. He co-founded the Société de Botanique de Bâle in 1952, and also co-founded the journal Bauhinia.

He was a plant collector who established an herbarium at Basel designated PAE. It was later transferred to Geneva and is now incorporated into the general herbarium collection at the Geneva Botanical Garden.

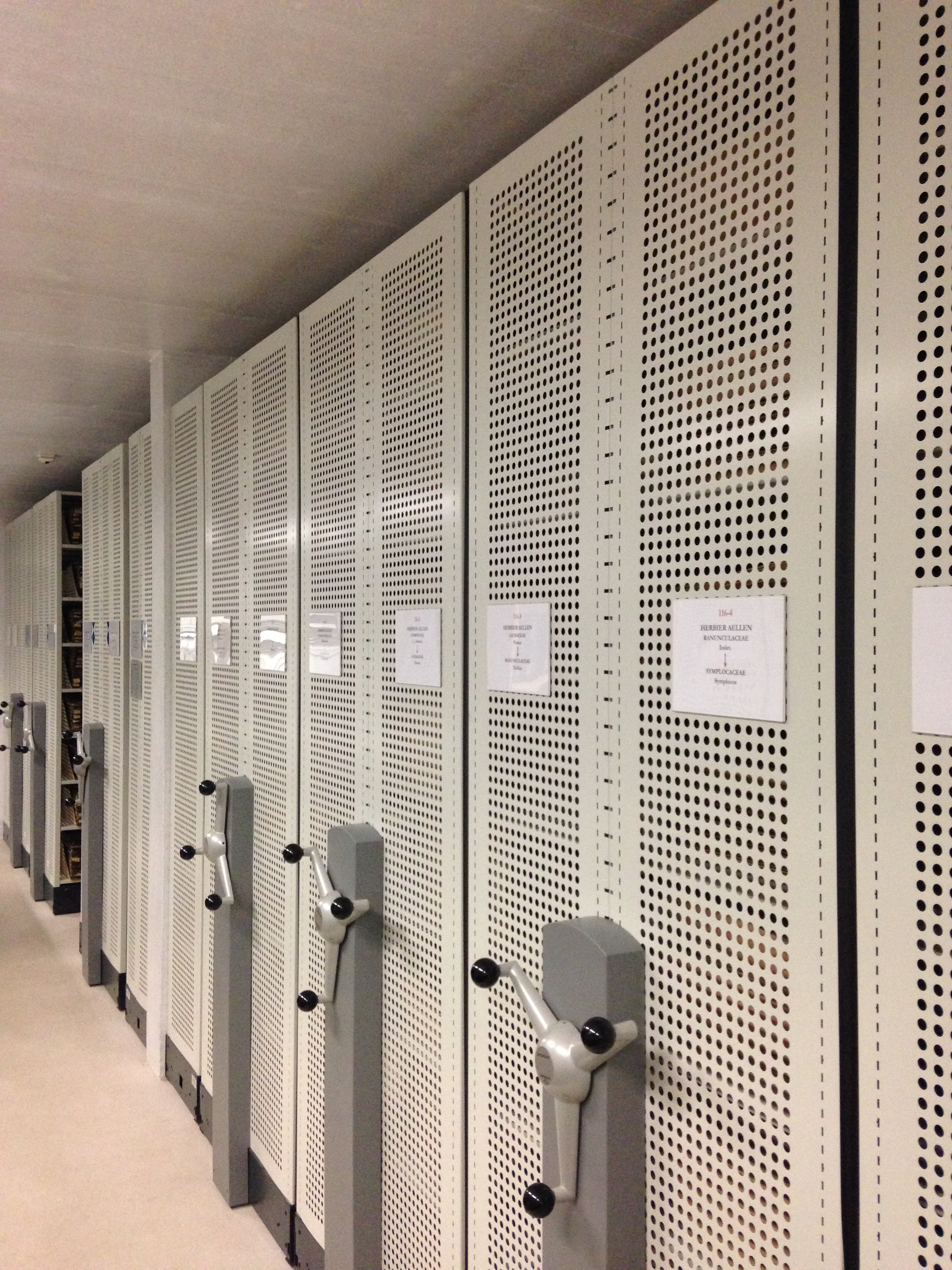
Herbier Aellen in the Conservatory and Botanical Garden of the City of Geneva

Aellen named and published 413 plants.

In 1934 Oskar Eberhard Ulbrich named the genus Aellenia in Aellen's honor in 1934. Other plants have been named after Aellen, including Marrubium aellenii Rech.f., Atriplex aellenii Sukhor., Caroxylon aellenii (Botsch.) Mucina, and others.
