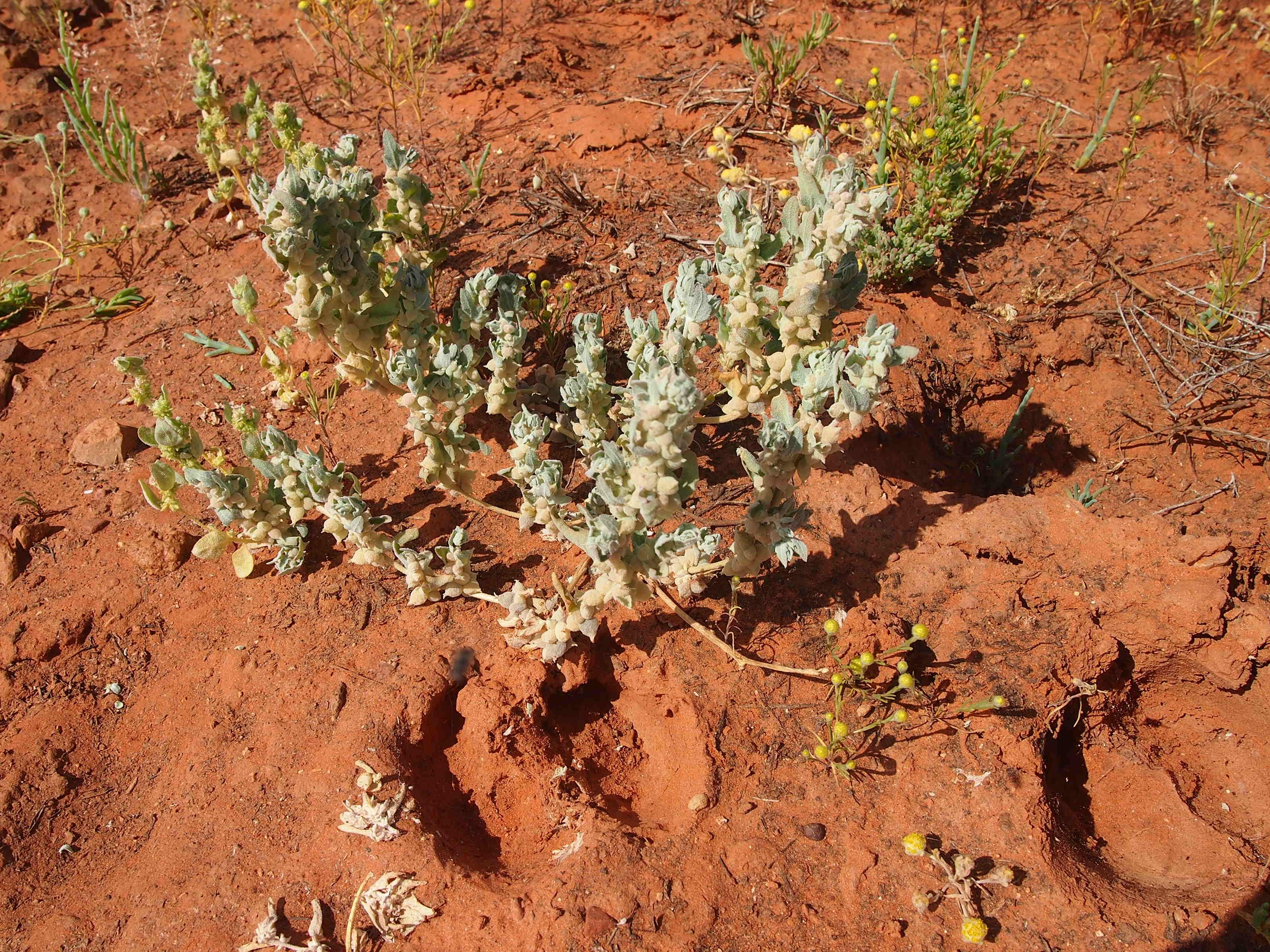
- Habit
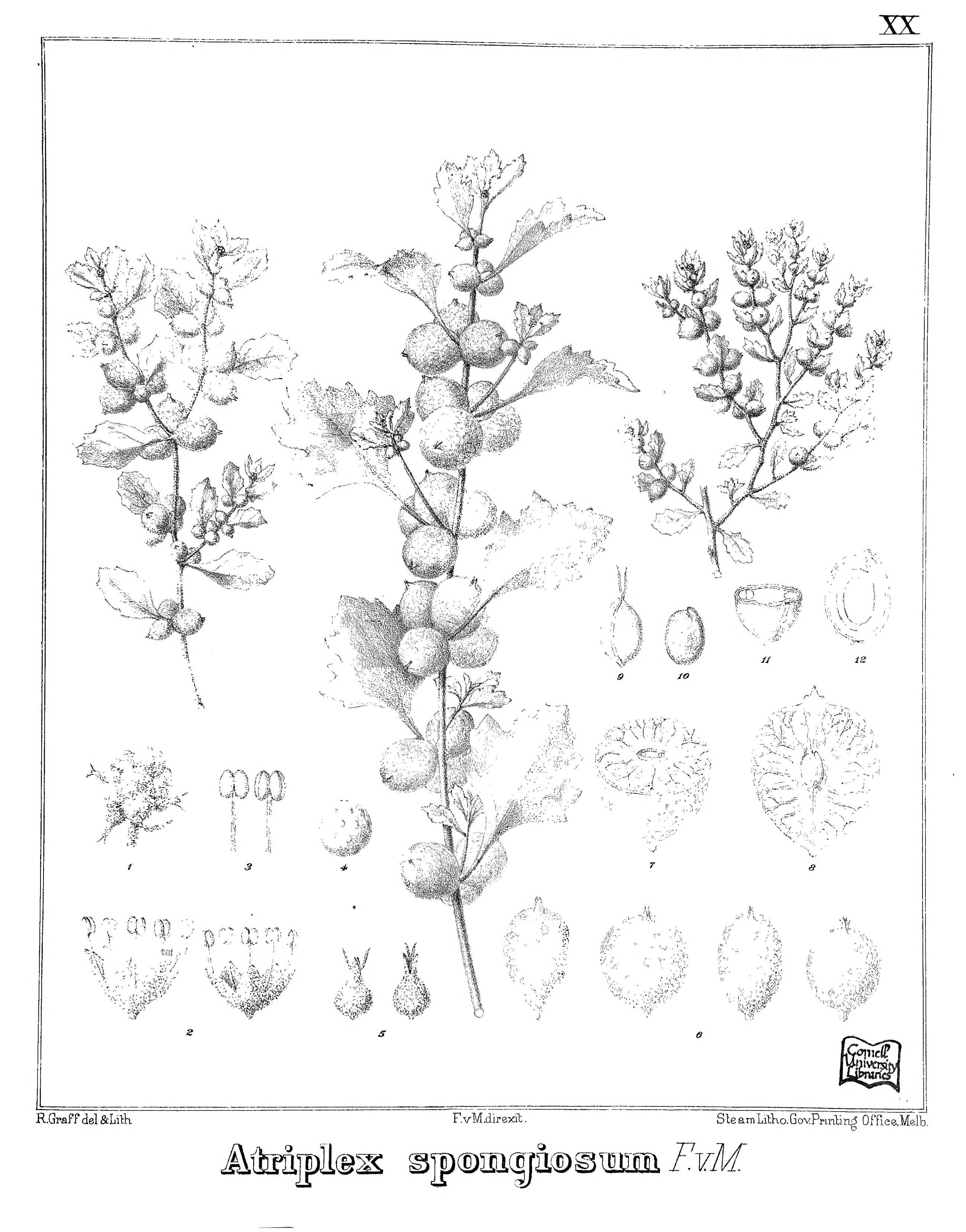
- Botanical illustration

Scientific classification
- Kingdom: Plantae
- Clade: Tracheophytes
- Clade: Angiosperms
- Clade: Eudicots
- Order: Caryophyllales
- Family: Amaranthaceae
- Genus: Atriplex
- Species: A. spongiosa

Binomial name
- Atriplex spongiosa F.Muell.

Synonyms
- Atriplex holocarpa var. spongiosa (F.Muell.) Maiden & Betche; Obione spongiosa (F.Muell.) G.L.Chu; Senniella spongiosa (F.Muell.) Aellen; Senniella spongiosa var. amoena Aellen; Senniella spongiosa var. euspongiosa Aellen

= Atriplex spongiosa =

Species of plant in the amaranth family

Atriplex spongiosa, the pop saltbush (a name it shares with Atriplex holocarpa), is a species of flowering plant in the family Amaranthaceae, native to central Australia, and introduced to South Africa and Iran. A halophyte, it can grow in media having an NaCl concentration over 600 mM.

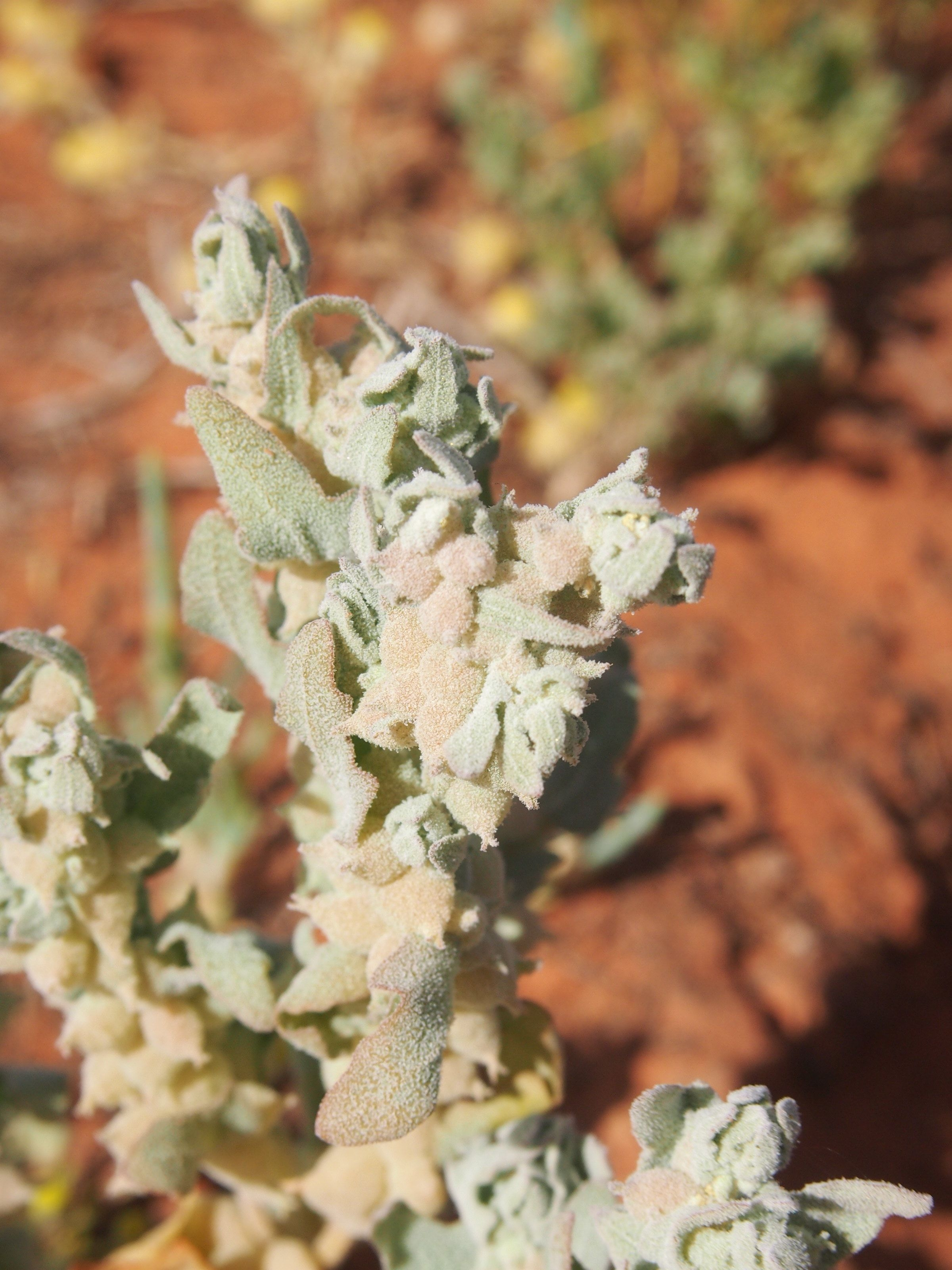
Close-up of fruit

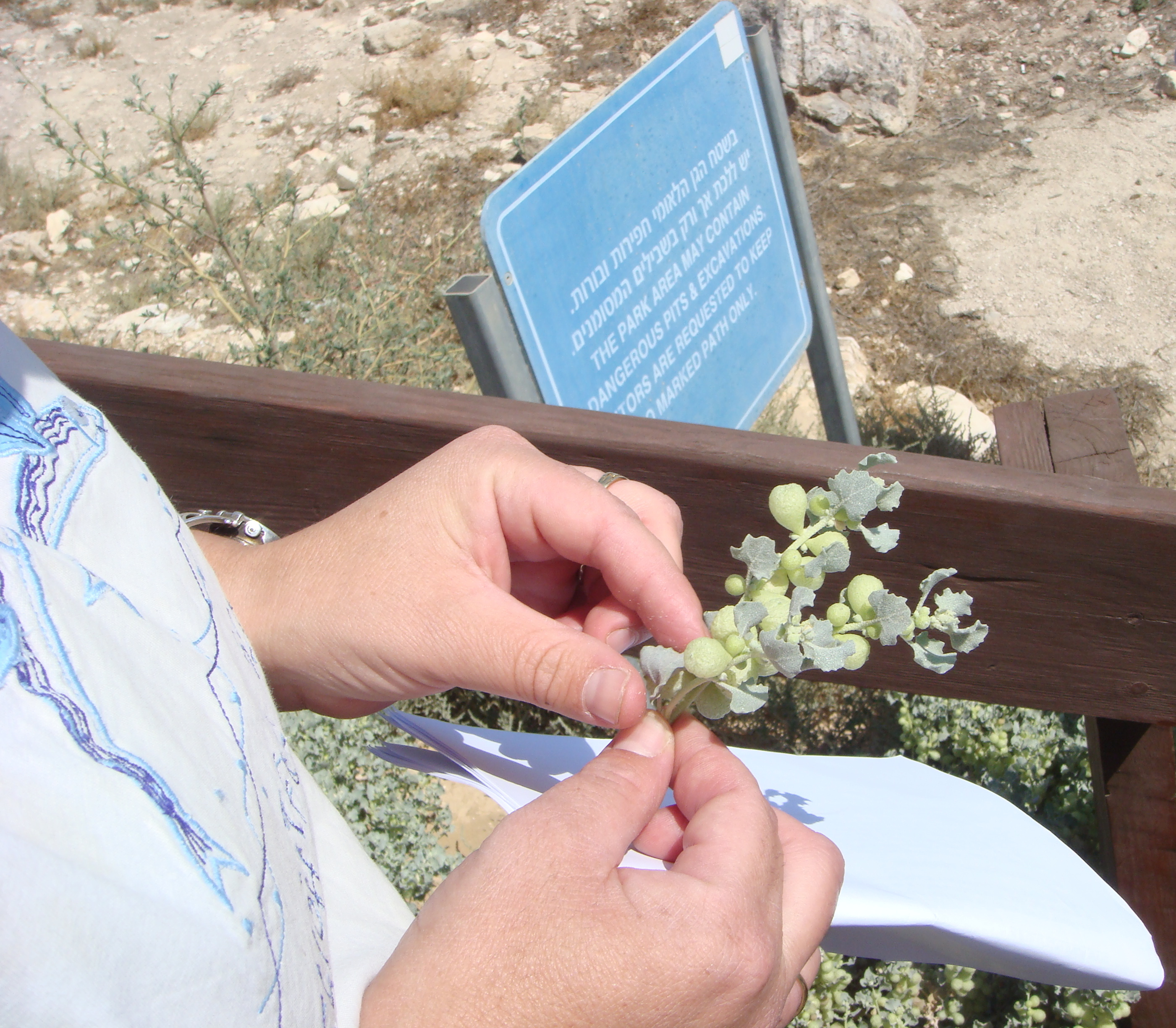
In Israel
