= Coastguard's Lookout Tower =

Signal Station

- Telegraph Tower
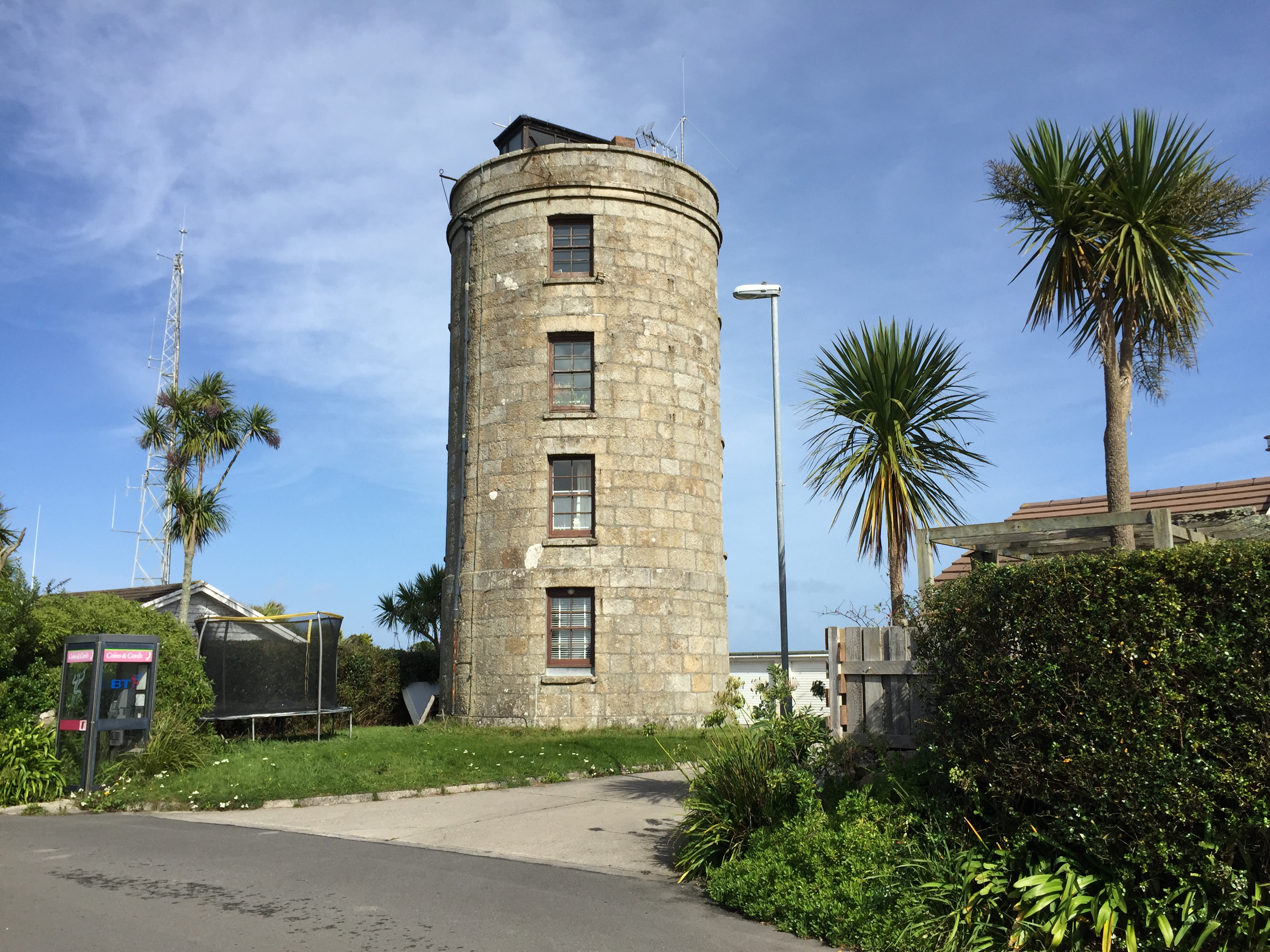

- Location within Isles of Scilly
- 49.92884°N 6.30363°W
- Location: St Mary's, Isles of Scilly

History
- Built: 1813–1816
- Built for: Admiralty

Site notes
- Architect: Messrs Hambledon

Listed Building – Grade II
- Official name: Coastguard's Look Out Tower
- Designated: 12 February 1975
- Reference no.: 1141182

Coastguard’s Lookout Tower, now known as Telegraph Tower, is a Grade II listed structure built around 1814-16 on St Mary's, Isles of Scilly as a Signal station for the Admiralty.

== History ==
In May 1812 the military governor of the Isles of Scilly, Lieutenant General Vigoureux, requested a new signal tower station on Newford Down, St Mary’s to allow signals to be passed from the mainland in Cornwall to the batteries below Star Castle. The Admiralty agreed and adverts for its construction were placed in October 1813.

After a series of delays, the tower was erected by Messrs. Hambledon. The date of construction is quoted as 1814, but it was reported in the Hampshire Chronicle on 8 January 1816 that had been erected on Newford Down, Scilly, and Lieutenant John Trinder RN was appointed to superintend it.

However, the tower appears to have been unsuccessful and in December 1816, it was closed down by the Admiralty and the building reverted to the custody of the land owner, George Osborne, 6th Duke of Leeds.

In 1831 the site was taken over by HM Coastguard as a subsidiary to the main station situated on the Garrison.

In 1903 a wireless mast and receiving office were built nearby, The Newford Down semaphore station became known as Telegraph Tower, and the area around it is now known as Telegraph. The Lloyd’s Mercantile Marine Signal Station in the garrison was closed and the work of signalling passing ships was carried out by the coastguards at Telegraph Tower.

In 1908 a telegraph house was erected on the tower's roof by the contractor, Arthur Carkeep.

Today, most of the tower is a residential property owned by the Duchy of Cornwall.
