= Tregarthen =

Tregarthen can refer to:

- A village near Goldsithney in Cornwall.
- Tregarthen's Hotel
- John Coulson Tregarthen (1854–1933), British naturalist and writer
- Enys Tregarthen (pseudonym), British writer Nellie Sloggett (1851–1923)
