= Lower Moors (St Mary's) =

Wetland in the Isles of Scilly

- Site of Special Scientific Interest
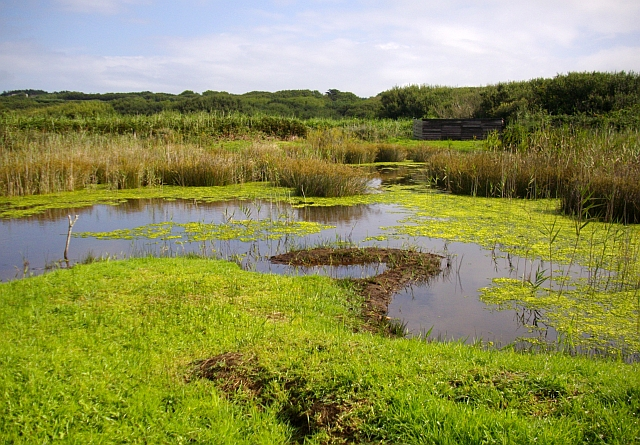
- The wetlands of Lower Moors

- Location within Isles of Scilly
- Location of Lower Moors (St Mary's).
- Area of search: Cornwall
- Grid reference: SV912106
- Coordinates: 49.9164°N 6.3025°W
- Interest: Biological
- Area: 10.2 hectares (0.10 km^{2}; 0.039 sq mi)
- Notification date: 1971

The Lower Moors is a wetland between Hugh Town and Old Town Bay on St Mary's, the largest island in the Isles of Scilly. The Isles of Scilly are an archipelago off the southwestern tip of the Cornish peninsula of Great Britain.

The site is owned by the Duchy of Cornwall and managed by the Isles of Scilly Wildlife Trust and is within the Isles of Scilly Area of Outstanding Natural Beauty. First designated as a Site of Special Scientific Interest (SSSI) in 1971 for its range of wetland habitats; it is an important feeding station for migrating and wintering birds such as common snipe and water rail. In 2007 Ashley Fisher found a great blue heron; the first confirmed record for Britain. The second British record for great blue heron also occurred on Lower Moor and, was also found by Ashley Fisher.

== Wildlife and ecology ==
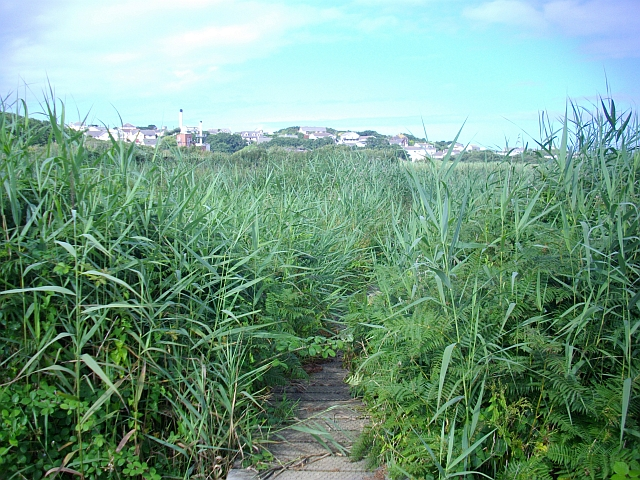
Reed beds in the Lower Moors reserve

Lower Moors is one of two wetlands on St Mary's and is designated as a SSSI for its wide range of wetland habitats, and also as a feeding site for passage and wintering birds. The marsh is fed by ground water and small streams forming small open pools, mire and willow scrub, and the marsh once extended from Old Town Bay to Porthloo Pool . As late as the 1960s there were wet fields around Porthloo Pool and Rose Hill with hemlock water-dropwort (Oenanthe crocata), lesser water-plantain (Baldellia ranunculoides) and yellow iris (Iris pseudacorus); but these fields are much drier nowadays. Lesser water-plantain has not been seen on the Isles of Scilly since the year 2000. The site can be entered via a short lane at Old Town, the original medieval settlement on St Mary's, or from the A3111 near Porth Mellon. The soils are wet, alluvium and peat overlying Hercynian granite bedrock. Since grazing was withdrawn some of the marsh is overgrown with abundant common reed (Phragmites australis), rushes (Juncus spp.) and grey willow (Salix cinerea). The drainage ditches, flow southward to Old Town Bay and divide the marsh into wet meadows with abundant soft rush (Juncus effusus), yellow iris and some ragged robin (Lychnis flos-cuculi) and greater bird's-foot trefoil (Lotus pedunculatus). Bramble (Rubus fruticosus) and bracken (Pteridium aquilinum) dominate the drier areas.

Lower Moors is a vital feeding area for resident birds, such as Eurasian coot, gadwall, mallard, common moorhen, Eurasian teal and various warblers. The small area of open water is important for passage snipe and water rail, while the reed beds and wet meadows are used by birds such as corncrake and spotted crake.

The first records of the short-winged cone-head was on St Agnes in 1989, confirmed in 1992 and found on Lower Moors in 1996. The eggs can be carried on vegetation as sea flotsam so it could have been established on Scilly earlier than 1989.

=== Great blue heron ===
To most bird watchers the Isles of Scilly are associated with rare birds, migrants and vagrants. The first accepted record of a great blue heron in Britain was recorded on 7 December 2007, by Cavell Smith at Lower Moors, and subsequently added to the British List of birds by the British Ornithologists' Union Records Committee (BOURC). On 14 April 2015, Cavell Smith observed two herons from the bird-hide on Lower Moor, one was a grey heron and the other a great blue heron; the second British record (if accepted by the (BOURC)). It had since been seen at Old Town Bay, on Tresco and on Bryher. Two previous records of the bird in Britain had had assisted passages aboard ships.

== See also ==
- Isles of Scilly Wildlife Trust
- Porth Hellick
