= Stephen Menheniott =

British murder victim

- Born: Stephen Richard Menheniott; 4 June 1957; Redhill, Surrey, England
- Died: January 1976; Isles of Scilly
- Cause of death: Homicide

Stephen Richard Menheniott (4 June 1957 – January 1976) was an 18-year-old English man with learning difficulties who was murdered by his father on the Isles of Scilly in 1976. This case was significant as not only was it a rare example of a murder on the islands, but it also called into question the way Stephen was dealt with by social services and led to questions in Parliament and an inquiry.

== Family ==
William Thomas (Tom) Menheniott was born in Cornwall on 26 February 1924. His mother died when he was three months old and his father was apparently blind, so he and his brother George, who was three years older, were brought up in a children's home administered by the Public Assistance Committee. The regime was harsh and corporal punishment was often employed. At the age of fourteen, George ran away and, after working on a farm for a while, enlisted in the Duke of Cornwall's Light Infantry.

When he reached the age of fourteen, Tom also ran away and joined the Army, where he qualified as a motor mechanic. In the 1940s he married Deirdre Philippa Maddern and they had two children. A girl, Deirdre Ann, was born on 18 January 1948 and taken into care by Cornwall County Council in infancy after Tom had been convicted of neglect, for which he was sent to prison. She was never reunited with her parents and was later fostered and attended a special school for children with learning difficulties. A boy, Christopher, was born on 7 February 1949. He too was taken into care and died from muscular dystrophy at the age of seventeen.

In about 1950, Tom separated from his wife and moved in with a woman called Elizabeth Uren. She used the surname Menheniott, although they were never married. They had six children together (the last of which died in infancy), although Elizabeth appears to have already had six children. A boy was born on 23 September 1950 and a girl on 14 July 1952. Both children were taken into care by Cornwall County Council in 1953 and both Tom and Elizabeth were convicted and imprisoned for neglect. After their release they began to travel around the country. A second son was born in Kent on 7 January 1955 and was soon afterwards taken into care by Kent County Council due to the family having no suitable accommodation. Tom assaulted the NSPCC inspector who dealt with the case. A second daughter was born on 27 May 1956.

Tom also continued fathering children with his estranged wife Deirdre. She had a child named William Thomas Menheniott in around 1952 who was taken into care and later adopted. They also had a child named Walter in July 1953 who took the name Woods from Deirdre's new partner, Leslie Woods.

== Birth and early years, 1957–1959 ==
Stephen was born in Redhill County Hospital, Surrey on 4 June 1957. His parents were at that time living in a caravan. The following year they became homeless, and on 13 January 1958 Stephen and his sister were taken into care by Surrey County Council and placed in a residential nursery at Epsom. At the end of January, the Menheniotts found alternative accommodation and their daughter was returned to them, but Stephen was not healthy and was kept in care. He was allowed home in August. His parents soon moved to Hailsham in East Sussex and four months later Stephen was admitted to hospital in Eastbourne in an undernourished condition. An NSPCC inspector described the conditions in which the Menheniotts lived as "deplorable". On 29 January 1959, the 19-month-old Stephen was taken into care direct from hospital by East Sussex County Council and placed in a residential nursery. Soon afterwards the Council assumed parental rights under Section 2 of the Children Act 1948, to the age of eighteen or until the resolution was rescinded.

== In care, 1959–1968 ==
In December 1959, at the age of 2½, Stephen was fostered by a young couple and seemed to be happy and doing well. However, in January 1961 his foster mother became pregnant with her first child, and Stephen's behaviour became highly disturbed. On 18 December 1961 he was readmitted to the residential nursery and it was decided that, due to his behaviour and his now obvious learning difficulties ("retardation" as it was then described), all contact with his foster parents should be severed. In February 1964 he was transferred to a children's home. From January 1962, he often visited and was visited by two local ladies who had offered to "befriend" a child as "aunties", and they became very fond of each other. In 1964, Stephen began attending a special school, but it was determined that he was too intelligent for this school (his IQ was assessed at 89), and in January 1966 he was transferred to the remedial class of the local primary school. He remained at this school and living in the children's home until July 1968, when he was eleven. In 1966, he began to visit his older brother, who was living with a foster family in Kent, but these visits were difficult as the brother (in common with many other people) found him somewhat irritating.

== The Isles of Scilly ==
In 1962, Tom and Elizabeth Menheniott moved to a tied cottage (i.e. a cottage that comes with a job) in East Sussex and their youngest daughter was returned to them from the foster home in Hastings where she had spent the last eighteen months. In 1965, the family moved to the Isles of Scilly.

The Isles of Scilly are very isolated and had a population at that time of about 2,400. The islands had no social services, although there was a Social Services Committee. By informal arrangement, Cornwall County Council provided any services that the islands could not provide for themselves.

Tom obtained employment with a daffodil farmer, and a small tied cottage went with the job. It was situated in the lonely hamlet of Holy Vale, at the far side of the main island of St Mary's and rarely visited by locals. The hamlet consisted of only three cottages, one of which was empty and one let to holidaymakers in season, and a farm. Tom was not particularly popular on the island, but he became something of a local 'character' and was seen as useful because of his mechanical skills (which he sometimes practised without charge). An unkempt, powerfully built man, he was known for his temper and bad language, but was also capable of acts of kindness. He was good at his job, got on well with his employer, and had apparently stopped drinking (he had previously been known as a heavy drinker).

== Return to family, 1968–1969 ==
Tom Menheniott had been asking for news of his children since 1966 and Stephen appeared to want to see his father (although he rarely mentioned his mother); and in 1967 the children's officer for Cornwall and the Isles of Scilly wrote to East Sussex County Council suggesting that, as the family now seemed to be settled, a visit could be arranged. On 15 August 1967, Stephen and his social worker set off for the Isles of Scilly, where the social worker reported that Tom was "brusque", "belligerent" and "intimidating". Stephen stayed with his family for twelve days, then returned to East Sussex. He began to regularly correspond with them and visited again at Christmas 1967 and Easter 1968. The two children in the care of Cornwall and the brother in care in Kent (who had run away from his foster parents in February 1968 and made his own way to the Isles of Scilly) were now living with their parents under "home on trial" arrangements. No signs of ill-treatment were seen, and after he had stayed with his family over the 1968 summer holidays, Stephen was allowed to stay permanently. He went to the local school with his brother and sister, and at first he seemed happy. The children were apparently always well-dressed and well-fed.

== In care again, 1969–1972 ==
However, things began to deteriorate. In April 1969, Stephen and his brother were caught stealing. In July 1969, the child care officer recorded that Stephen appeared to be frightened of his father and siblings. In September 1969, it was suggested that Elizabeth wished to leave her common law husband. In November 1969, Stephen confessed to the child care officer that he had probably been happier in care. He was also apparently being bullied by other children at school.

Things came to a head in November 1969, when the youngest daughter (who was thirteen) became pregnant and Tom was charged with incest. On 24 November 1969, all the children were removed and returned to the mainland. Tom was acquitted, but the pregnant daughter was still taken into care by the Isles of Scilly Council. The 15-year-old brother was found to have a fractured humerus and said that he had no wish to return to his family; he was returned to his foster home in Kent. Several of the children later admitted that they had had arms broken by Tom at one time or another, but were too frightened to report it at the time. Tom's relations with the other islanders deteriorated, as most of them seem to have believed that he was wrongly acquitted. Cornwall County Council proposed placing Stephen in a residential special school, but the educational psychologist who assessed him considered that this would be inappropriate as, although he was currently functioning at below average ability, he was of near average intelligence. Stephen himself expressed a desire to return to East Sussex and on 22 December 1969 his wishes were granted.

However, Stephen then expressed a desire to return to his family. He was living in an assessment centre and was isolated, finding it difficult to make friends and being bullied, although he was popular with adults. He was likeable and polite, although he had occasional aggressive outbursts, usually directed at inanimate objects. For some reason, his two "aunties" were not informed of his return to the county. He was transferred to the centre's long stay unit, but did not attend school. He continued to correspond regularly with his family and began to ask to visit. His mother, however, was now living on the mainland (and was never to return to Tom) and only the oldest sister had returned to live with her father. She and Tom expressed a desire for Stephen's return. The children's officer for Cornwall and the Isles of Scilly disagreed, describing Tom as "an aggressive psychopath and a morally corrupt man". However, social workers in East Sussex decided that Stephen needed his family and he was allowed to visit between 24 December 1971 and 5 January 1972.

On 7 August 1972 he once again travelled to the Isles of Scilly, supposedly for a three-week visit. It was, however, obvious at this stage that he would not be expected to return to East Sussex. When the children's officer in Cornwall heard about this, she wrote to the director of social services of East Sussex expressing her deep disapproval and stating that it would be impossible for Cornwall Social Services to arrange any supervision due to the isolation of the location and the aggressive attitude of Tom Menheniott. East Sussex Social Services replied that they did not share her concern. Stephen was allowed to stay with his father and nobody from East Sussex Social Services ever visited him, despite the fact that East Sussex County Council had assumed parental rights until his eighteenth birthday. East Sussex closed their case file on Stephen. The family now consisted of Tom, his 20-year-old oldest daughter, her oldest child (she had two more children in the next two years), and the 17-year-old Stephen.

== Last years in the Isles of Scilly, 1972–1976 ==
Stephen obtained employment as a shelf-stacker in a local supermarket, but was dismissed after about six months due to his poor personal hygiene. Shortly before this, the Council of the Isles reported to the children's officer that there seemed to be no problems. However, in April 1973 the youngest daughter and her boyfriend visited Holy Vale and Tom beat her up. Stephen was given employment by a flower farmer, but was reluctantly dismissed after it became obvious that he would never be able to work on his own. He may have later worked casually on the same farm as his father. Few people visited the increasingly squalid cottage and, apart from Tom, the Menheniotts were rarely seen around the island. When the community nurse visited to check up on the young children, she described Stephen as "looking like a frightened rabbit", but did not see any signs of physical injury. However, in October 1975 Stephen visited the island's dentist, a Mr Fairest, where it was found that three of his front teeth were broken beyond repair.

In 1976, Stephen disappeared. His family claimed that he had gone to the mainland to visit a girlfriend. However, the dentist, Mr Fairest, had been troubled by the injuries he had witnessed, and reported his concerns to the police. Some time later, Stephen's body was discovered buried in a shallow grave in California Field, near the cottage, with logs piled on top of it. It is likely that he died during the first week of 1976.

== The trial ==
Thomas Menheniott was charged with murder, four counts of grievous bodily harm, and preventing an inquest by burying the body. He admitted the last charge, but denied the other five, and was committed for trial at Bodmin Crown Court. The trial began before Mr Justice Willis on 6 December 1977.

The prosecutor, David Owen-Thomas QC, alleged that Tom beat his son over a period of years with high tension cables, scaffolding, a shovel, a broomstick, a fence post, and a potato tray. He also threw a knife and hot tea at him and punched him. He was tethered outside the cottage and not allowed to leave. He had five fractures on four ribs, one of which was fractured twice within days of his death. When he died his father put his body in his car and took him to California Field, before putting it in a wheelbarrow, covering it with a tarpaulin, and taking it to the grave he had already dug.

On 16 December 1977, the jury of ten men and two women took almost four hours to return a guilty verdict on the murder charge, but were discharged from returning verdicts on the GBH charges. Tom was sentenced to life imprisonment for murder, plus five years to run concurrently for concealing the body. The judge criticised the people of the Isles of Scilly (with the notable exception of Mr Fairest, whom he praised) for failing to help Stephen, and also Cornwall and East Sussex County Councils for their lack of supervision, although it was accepted by the later inquiry that Cornwall had no legal obligation to provide services to the Isles of Scilly.

== Inquiries ==
On 20 December 1977, an internal inquiry in East Sussex County Council found that the council failed to properly supervise Stephen once he had gone to live with his father.

In January 1978, David Ennals, the Secretary of State for Social Services, instituted a departmental inquiry by Claris Jayne, Joan Acton and Jim Wheatley. This inquiry reported in September 1978. It met Elizabeth Menheniott, her other children, and Stephen's uncle, George Menheniott, now a chauffeur and gardener living in Hampshire, as well as members and employees of Cornwall and East Sussex County Councils and the Council of the Isles of Scilly, employees of the health authorities involved, and officers of Devon and Cornwall Constabulary.

The inquiry found that:

- Too great an emphasis was placed on Stephen's wishes to return to his family and too little on the opinions of officials who had knowledge of Stephen and his family.
- East Sussex County Council's decision not to confer with Cornwall County Council on the case and to close the case file on Stephen before his eighteenth birthday was indefensible.
- The withdrawal of Cornwall County Council from the case was justifiable on both professional and statutory grounds.
- The arrangement between East Sussex County Council and the Council of the Isles of Scilly for the latter to keep an eye on Stephen was too informal and ineffective.
- The problems were exacerbated by the Menheniott children having been in the care of several different authorities.
- Major reorganisations were taking place in social services departments at the time and staff were under great pressure.

== See also ==
- List of solved missing person cases
