= Normandy, Isles of Scilly =

Coordinates: 49.9225°N 6.283°W

Normandy
- Location within Isles of Scilly
- Population: 2,200
- Civil parish: St Mary's
- Unitary authority: Isles of Scilly
- Ceremonial county: Cornwall
- Region: South West
- Country: England
- Sovereign state: United Kingdom
- Post town: ISLES OF SCILLY
- Postcode district: TR21
- Dialling code: 01720
- Police: Devon and Cornwall
- Fire: Isles of Scilly
- Ambulance: South Western
- UK Parliament: St Ives

Normandy is a small settlement on the island of St Mary's, the largest of the Isles of Scilly, England. It is located in the east of the island, between Pelistry (to the north) and Porth Hellick (to the south) on the A3110 road.

The Isles of Scilly's only public swimming pool is located here; it is covered. The settlement is otherwise largely residential, with houses and apartments lived in by permanent residents of the island.

The main building [Granite] has six apartments inside with two extension buildings adding four more apartments attached to the main [granite] building. The building was originally built as a farmworker house, the building was owned by Barnsley Ward when his farm was running. The building was then taken over by Jean & John Thomas running it as a hotel for any guests and locals, it contained a bar inside at the time they owned it, with the hotel they also owned the public swimming pool before it had the cover put on top, of course, it was open and unheated but still an attraction to visitors and locals. When the Duchy Of Cornwall took over the property they added a carpark to the front of the building and sheds for the residence, they did however remove a water tank from the back carpark to make space for the residence that is entered from the back.

Close by is the island's main desalination works, which draws water in from the sea and purifies it for the public freshwater system.
