= Maypole, Isles of Scilly =

Coordinates: 49.92635°N 6.291°W

Maypole: Cornish: Peul Kala' Me
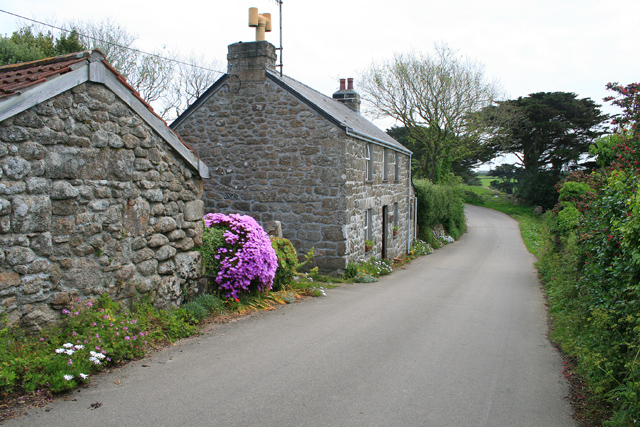
- Cottage on the A3110 road

- Location within Isles of Scilly
- Civil parish: St Mary's
- Unitary authority: Isles of Scilly
- Ceremonial county: Cornwall
- Region: South West
- Country: England
- Sovereign state: United Kingdom
- Post town: ISLES OF SCILLY
- Postcode district: TR21
- Dialling code: 01720
- Police: Devon and Cornwall
- Fire: Isles of Scilly
- Ambulance: South Western
- UK Parliament: St Ives

Maypole (Cornish: Peul Kala' Me) is a dispersed settlement located on the island of St Mary's, the largest of the Isles of Scilly, England. It is a tourist and farming area, with the only horse riding school in the islands.

Nearby are Holy Vale and Pelistry. The A3110 road runs through the area; on this road to the west of Maypole, towards Telegraph, is Silver Carn or High Lanes, a small settlement which includes a large guesthouse and café.
