= A3110 road =

A3110

Route information
- Maintained by Council of the Isles of Scilly
- Length: 2.6 mi (4.2 km)

Major junctions
- A3111; A3112

Location
- Country: United Kingdom

Road network
- Roads in the United Kingdom; Motorways; A and B road zones

The A3110 is a circular A road in the Isles of Scilly. Its route forms a circle within the centre of the island of St Mary's, the largest and most populous island in the archipelago.

Like all the roads in Scilly, there are very few road signs or markings, and the route number is not marked at all.

Settlements on the route, which resembles a quiet country lane for most of its length, include Parting Carn, High Lanes, Maypole and Normandy — all of which are very small.

The A3111 and A3112 roads join the A3110 at Parting Carn. Both run via different routes to the main settlement of the island, Hugh Town; the A3112 however also runs by St Mary's Airport and through Old Town.

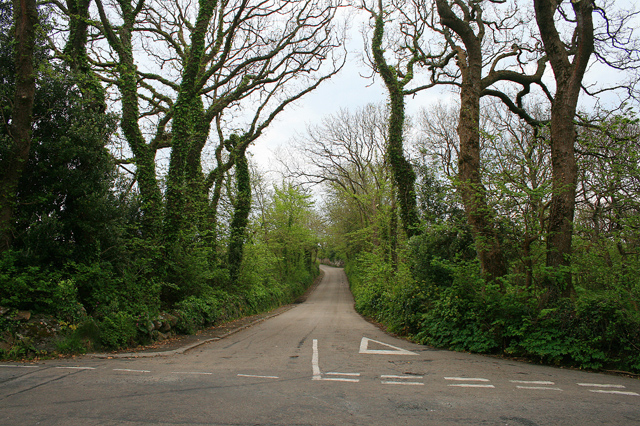
The start and end of the A3110, at Parting Carn — the road to the left is the (end of the) A3111.
