= Rocky Hill, Isles of Scilly =

Coordinates: 49.92°N 6.303°W

Rocky Hill: Cornish: Breveynek
- Location within Isles of Scilly
- Civil parish: St Mary's
- Unitary authority: Isles of Scilly
- Ceremonial county: Cornwall
- Region: South West
- Country: England
- Sovereign state: United Kingdom
- Post town: ISLES OF SCILLY
- Postcode district: TR21
- Dialling code: 01720
- Police: Devon and Cornwall
- Fire: Isles of Scilly
- Ambulance: South Western
- UK Parliament: St Ives

Rocky Hill (Cornish: Breveynek) is a minor hill with a small settlement, on the island of St Mary's in the Isles of Scilly, England. Nearby are Porthloo and Longstone.
