= Isles of Scilly Town Hall =

Municipal building in Hugh Town, Isles of Scilly, England

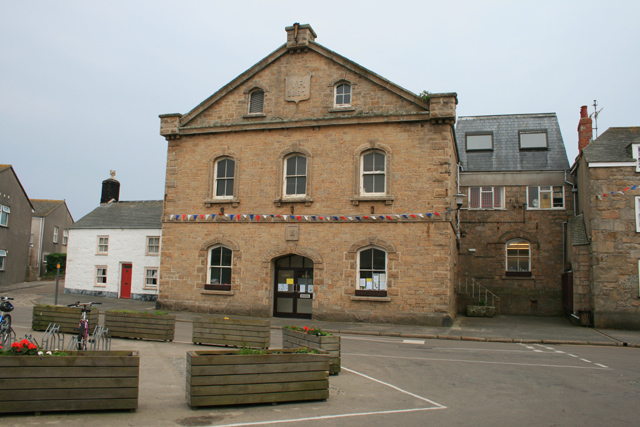
- The building in 2008

- Shown on Isles of Scilly
- 49.9144°N 6.3153°W
- Location: The Parade, Hugh Town, Isles of Scilly, England

History
- Built: 1889

Site notes
- Architect: J. Goodfellow
- Architectural style: Neoclassical style

Listed Building – Grade II
- Official name: Town Hall
- Designated: 14 December 1992
- Reference no.: 1219066

The Isles of Scilly Town Hall is a municipal building in Hugh Town, on the Isles of Scilly, in England. The building, which serves as the offices of Council of the Isles of Scilly, is a Grade II listed building.

== History ==
The building was commissioned by Algernon Dorrien-Smith, whose uncle, Augustus Smith had acquired a lease over the Isles of Scilly from the Duchy of Cornwall for £20,000 in 1834, and created himself Lord Proprietor of the Isles of Scilly. He had intended that it would accommodate a market hall and some public rooms. The site he selected was an area known as The Parade, a small park situated at the centre of the isthmus, which had served as a parade ground for the Sea Fencibles during the Napoleonic Wars. The new building was designed by J. Goodfellow in the neoclassical style, built in coursed granite and was completed in 1889. It served as a public hall, theatre, magistrates' court, council chamber, and local authority offices.

In 1891, the Isles of Scilly Rural District Council was formed, as a sui generis local government authority, separate to the council on mainland Cornwall, but still within the ceremonial county of Cornwall. The council established its offices in the town hall, and went on to commission an extension to create extra office space in 1970. Following the implementation of the Local Government Act 1972, the council was renamed as the Council of the Isles of Scilly.

The council relocated its council chamber to the Old Wesleyan Chapel on Garrison Lane, in 2002. By the 2010s, the town hall was in poor repair and the stage area was condemned in 2017. In 2024, the council received a £4.6 million National Lottery Heritage Fund grant to restore the building. The building will house a cultural centre and the Isles of Scilly Museum, whose previous building, purpose-built in 1967, was condemned as unsafe in 2019. Some of the existing museum's objects were moved into temporary storage in the town hall in 2020.

== Architecture ==
The two-storey building is constructed of squared and coursed granite, and it has a slate roof. It has a rectangular plan. The design involves a symmetrical main frontage of three bays facing onto The Parade. The central bay features a doorway flanked by two sash windows. The first floor is fenestrated by three more sash windows and all openings have segmental surrounds and keystones. At roof level there is a pediment. with a date stone flanked by two small windows in the tympanum. The building was grade II listed in 1992.
