= Kingfisher Boats =

British boat building company

- Seahorse of 1997 in the Isles of Scilly
- Industry: Boat builder
- Founded: 1986 in Falmouth, Cornwall
- Founder: Ronnie and Mary Coote
- Defunct: 2011
- Fate: Defunct
- Products: Glass reinforced plastic hulls and boats

Kingfisher Boats was a boat building company based in Falmouth, Cornwall from 1986 to 2011.

== History ==
The business was established in 1986 by Ronnie and Mary Coote with an emphasis on producing glass-reinforced plastic boats for inshore fishing and small to medium-sized passenger vessels. It was based at the Bicland Industrial Park in Falmouth.

Their vessels were sold to many inshore and coastal operators around the UK including the St Mary's Boatmen's Association in the Isles of Scilly and other operators in the Scottish Islands. One of their most notable contracts was the construction of hulls for the final two Archer-class patrol vessel for the Royal Navy which were then completed by Ailsa Shipbuilding Company.

When the business closed in 2011, the Kingfisher brand was sold to Anderson Marine of Peterhead who continued to produce the K20, K24, K26 and K33 ranges of displacement hulls. Trinity Boats of Plymouth continued to produce the 31 feet (9.4 m) fast catch boats.

== List of vessels ==
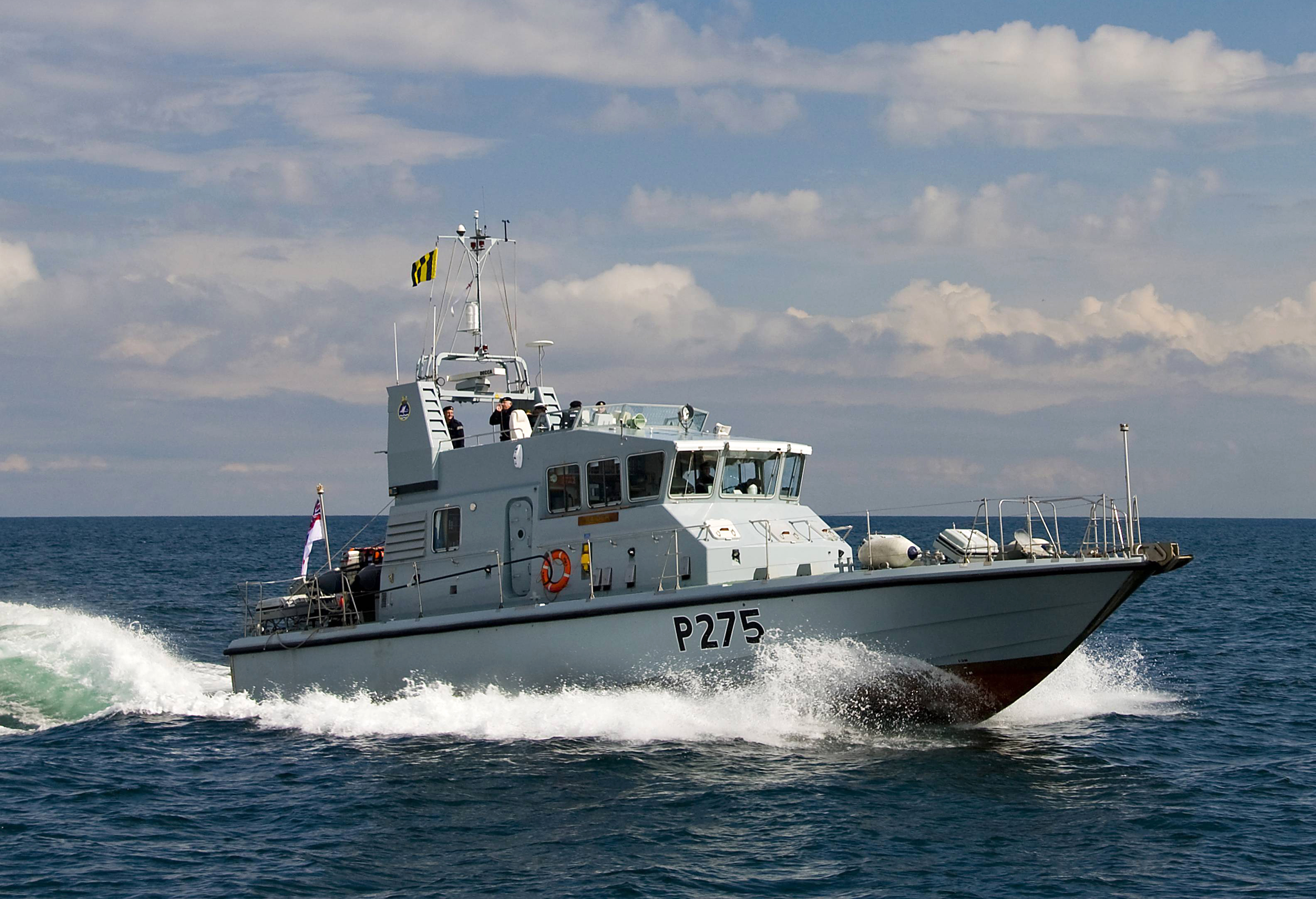
HMS Raider of 1997

Osprey of 2003

- Koresh 1993 (used in the Titanic film)
- Mary M 1993 a Kingfisher K33 for Norrie J. MacLeod of Bernera
- Kingfisher 1995 (part of the St Mary's Boatmen's Association fleet) MMSI 235004222
- Mont’s Pride 1996, a Kingfisher K40 mussel dredger
- Excaliber 1997 for Lawrence Moar in Cullivoe, Shetland.
- Seahorse 1997 (part of the St Mary's Boatmen's Association fleet) MMSI 235027743
- HMS Tracker (P274) 1997 (hull only, vessel completed by Ailsa Shipbuilding Company)
- HMS Raider (P275) 1997 (hull only, vessel completed by Ailsa Shipbuilding Company)
- Nazanna 1998 for Adrian Roe of Whitby
- Sapphire 2000 (part of the St Mary's Boatmen's Association fleet) MMSI 235012863
- Prosperity 2001 for Kenny Cowe of Peterhead (hull only, completed by Seaway Marine, Macduff) IMO 8972534
- Lea-Rig IV 2001 for Brian Black, Aberdeen.
- Meridian 2003 A Kingfisher K50. (Part of the St Mary's Boatmen's Association fleet) MMSI 235008613
- Osprey 2003 A Kingfisher K50. (Part of the St Mary's Boatmen's Association fleet)
- Gunner Glory II 2003 for the Sutherland Game and Shellfish company of Lairg. MMSI 232026087
