= St Martin's Methodist Church, Isles of Scilly =

Methodist Chapel, St Martin’s, Isles of Scilly
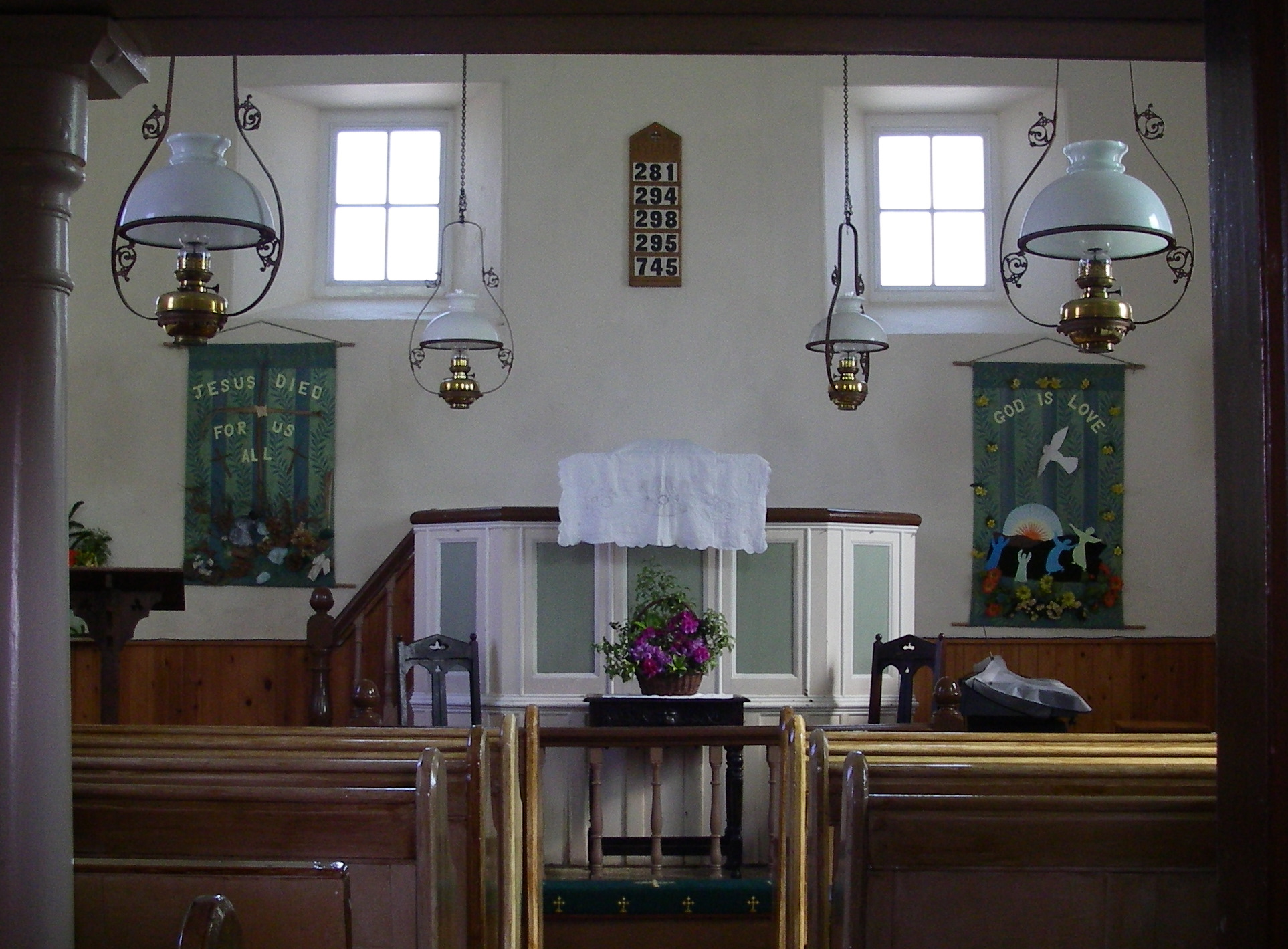
- Methodist Chapel, St Martin’s, Isles of Scilly
- Methodist Chapel, St Martin’s, Isles of Scilly
- 49°57′35.5″N 6°17′1″W
- Location: St Martin's, Isles of Scilly
- Country: England
- Denomination: Methodist
- Previous denomination: Bible Christian

History
- Founded: 1821

Architecture
- Completed: 1836

Listed Building – Grade II
- Official name: Methodist Church
- Designated: 14 December 1992
- Reference no.: 1218371

The Methodist Church, St Martin's, Isles of Scilly is a Grade II listed chapel in St Martin's, Isles of Scilly.

== History ==
Bible Christians arrived in St Martin's in the 1820s and built a simple thatched chapel around 1821. This was replaced in 1836 by the current building. In 1876 the chapel was reseated and in 1881 a Sunday School hall was added. In 1907, the Bible Christian Church in England was amalgamated with the United Methodist Free Churches and the Methodist New Connexion, to form the United Methodist Church.

The church is now part of the Isles of Scilly Methodist Circuit.

== See also ==
- St Mary's Methodist Church, Isles of Scilly
