= Pelistry =

Coordinates: 49.9265°N 6.286°W

Pelistry: Cornish: Porth Lystry
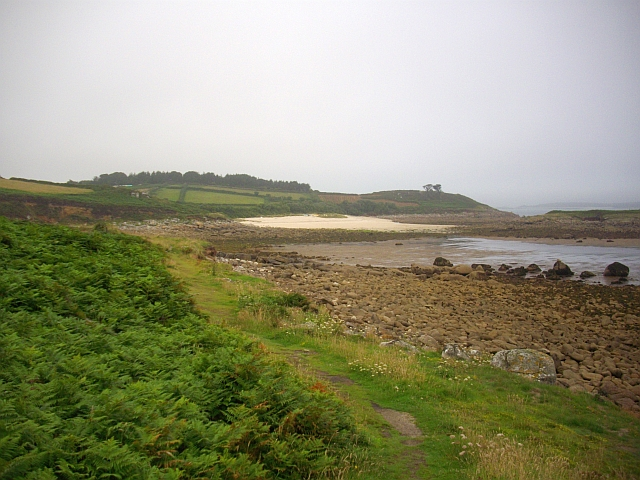
- Gilbert's Porth, South Pelistry Bay

- Location within Isles of Scilly
- Civil parish: St Mary's
- Unitary authority: Isles of Scilly
- Ceremonial county: Cornwall
- Region: South West
- Country: England
- Sovereign state: United Kingdom
- Post town: ISLES OF SCILLY
- Postcode district: TR21
- Dialling code: 01720
- Police: Devon and Cornwall
- Fire: Isles of Scilly
- Ambulance: South Western
- UK Parliament: St Ives

Pelistry (Cornish: Porth Lystry "cove for ships") is a small settlement, situated east of Maypole and north of Normandy, in the east of the island of St Mary's in the Isles of Scilly, England. The name is first recorded in 1650 as Porthlistrye.

The main industries are farming and tourism; there is a camp site in Pelistry and nearby is the Carn Vean Tearoom.

The small islet of Toll's Island is situated in Pelistry Bay and can be reached on foot when the tide is low.
