= Giant's Castle, Isles of Scilly =

Iron Age promontory fort on the Isles of Scilly, England

The Giant's Castle
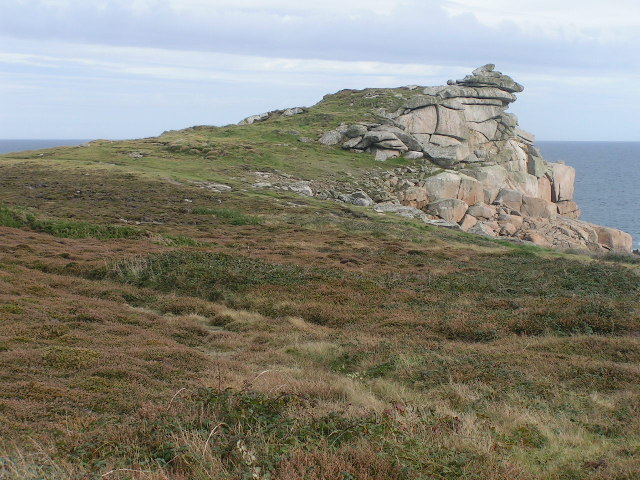
- Viewed from the west. The defensive banks can be seen on the slope linking the fort to the mainland.

- Location within Isles of Scilly
- 49°54′42″N 6°17′7″W
- Type: Promontory fort
- Periods: Iron Age
- Location: St Mary's, Isles of Scilly
- OS grid reference: SV 925 101

Site notes
- Area: 0.4 hectares (1 acre)

Scheduled monument
- Official name: The Giant's Castle cliff castle, St Mary's
- Designated: 7 October 1976
- Reference no.: 1011935

The Giant's Castle is a promontory fort of the Iron Age, on St Mary's, Isles of Scilly, England. It is a scheduled monument.

== Description ==
The fort is situated in the south-east of St Mary's, near St Mary's Airport and on the edge of Salakee Down. The rocky promontory, area 0.4 hectares (1 acre), is defended by sea cliffs, 15 to 25 metres (49 to 82 ft) high, on the east, south and south-west sides. To the north there are three banks and ditches, 8 to 12 metres (26 to 39 ft) apart; these occupy most of the steep northern slope linking the promontory to the mainland. The castle, on almost level ground within the promontory, has an internal area of about 25 by 20 metres (82 by 66 ft).

During the Second World War, a practice firing target for military aircraft was made in the western end of the outermost rampart. This survives as an unroofed rectangular structure up to 1 metre (3 ft 3 in) high. Fragments of early Iron Age pottery were recovered from cuttings made by the army.

== See also ==
- Hillforts in Britain
- Promontory forts of Cornwall
