= Watermill Cove =

Cove on St Mary's, Isles of Scilly, England

Coordinates: 49.9314°N 6.2874°W

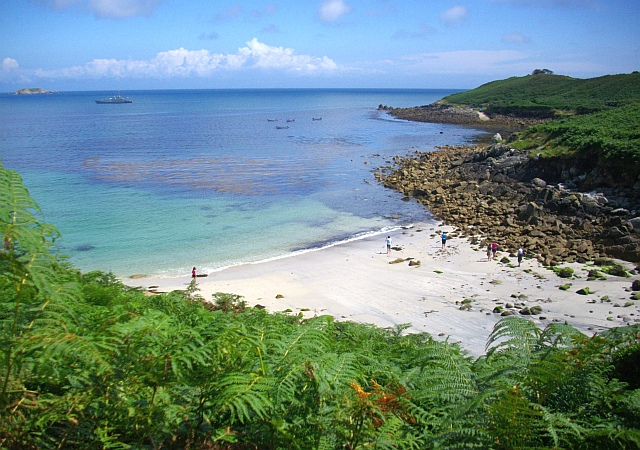
Watermill Cove and Tregear's Porth

Watermill Cove is on the north–east coast of St Mary's, Isles of Scilly.

It is a historic anchorage, still used today by passing yachts and other small vessels. At Tregear's Porth, there are the remains of an old quay, with the slipway still in use for small craft.

The cove is within an Area of Outstanding Natural Beauty, is a Geological Conservation Review site and was designated a Site of Special Scientific Interest (SSSI) in 1996. The 0.48-hectare (1.2-acre) site is notified for a succession of Quaternary exposures in the cliff and from sea level to the top of the cliff (oldest to youngest) the succession shows:

- head deposits
- organic silts and sands
- head deposits of the Late Devensian with microscopic remains of plants and pollen and dated to c. 30,000 years before present. The remains indicate an Arctic tundra climate
- raised beach deposits, a storm beach of the Late Ipswichian interglacial 130,000 years ago and ended about 114,000 years ago.
