= Tregarthen's Hotel =

- Interactive map of the Tregarthen's Hotel area

General information
- Type: Hotel
- Location: Hugh Town, St Mary's, Isles of Scilly
- Coordinates: 49.91576°N 6.31852°W
- Opened: 1849

Website
- www.tregarthens-hotel.co.uk

Tregarthen's Hotel is a hotel in Hugh Town on St Mary's in the Isles of Scilly.

Tregarthen's was the very first hotel to be established on the Isles of Scilly, having been founded in 1849 by Captain Frank Tregarthen, who ran the packet ship delivering mail, provisions and visitors between Penzance and the Isles of Scilly.

== History ==
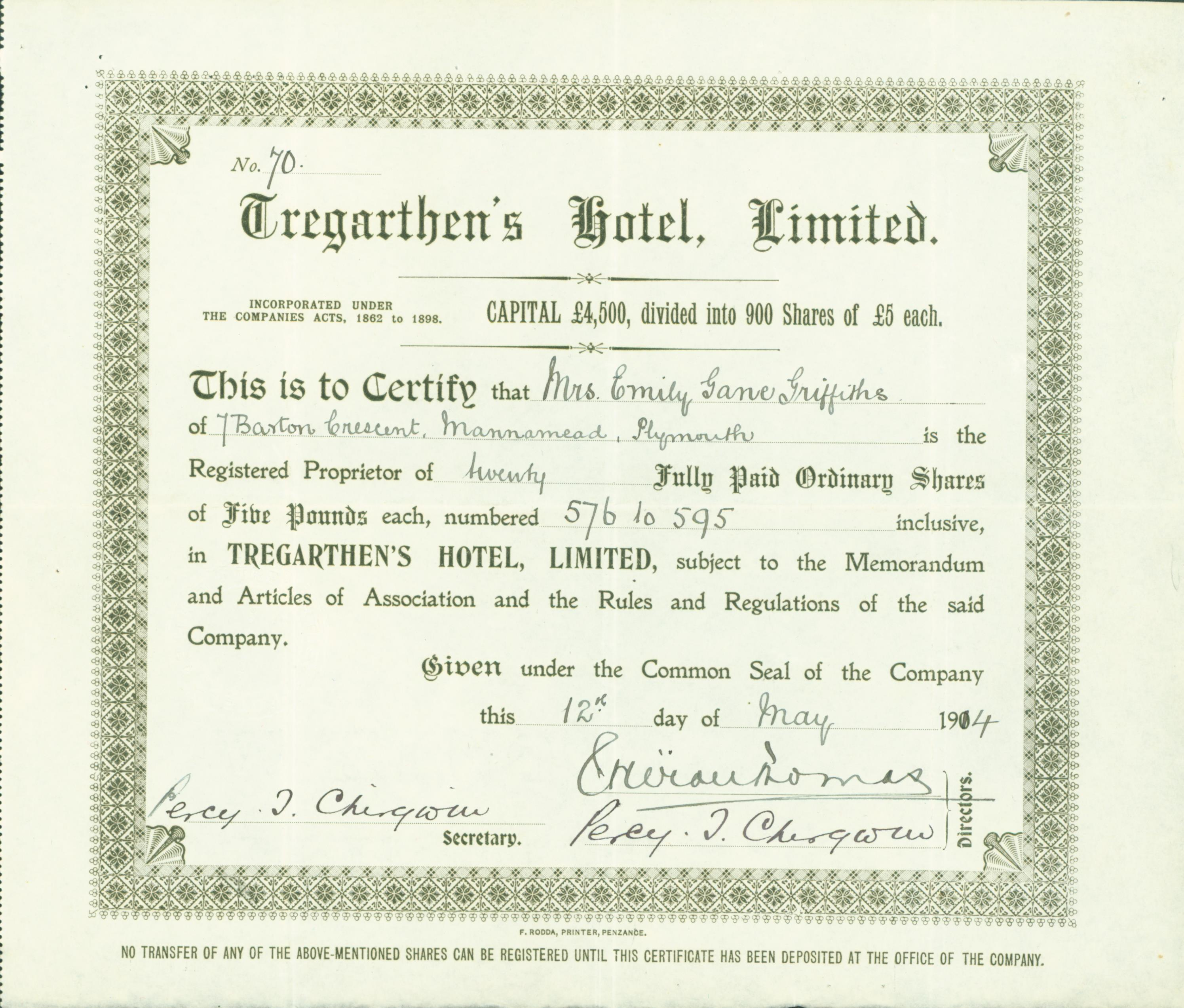
Share of the Tregarthen's Hotel, Ltd. isued 12 May 1914

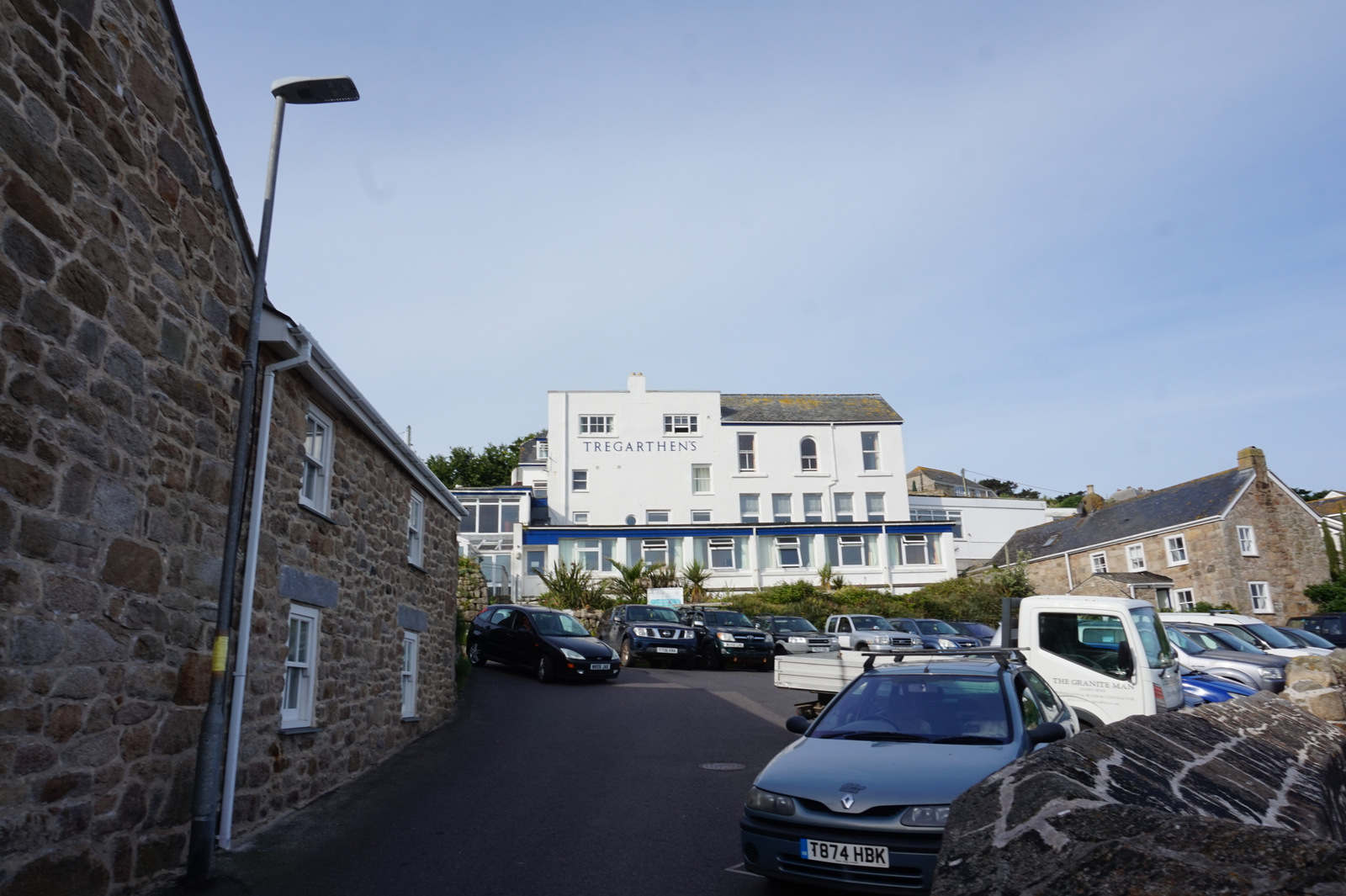
Tregarthen's Hotel, Hugh Town, Isles of Scilly

Up until the mid-nineteenth century, there was no regular transport between the Isles of Scilly and the mainland UK. Then, in 1849, the locals on Scilly decided to resolve this situation and provide a sloop as a connecting link with the mainland. There was great local excitement when this sailing packet, named Ariadne, was first brought to the islands by its skipper, Captain Frank Tregarthen. The Ariadne was introduced into service in 1850.

Between 1849 and 1858, with his three daughters, Captain Frank Tregarthen opened up his family house at the foot of the Garrison Hill to paying guests. Captain Frank would load up the boat with mail, provisions and adventurous passengers in Penzance and bring them to his house for their stay on the islands. Thus Tregarthen's Hotel was established – the very first hotel on the isles of Scilly.

“Visitors to Scilly were few and far between. No one ever thought of going to the Islands for pleasure, and those whose business called them there were only too anxious to get away on the first favourable opportunity. But here was the rub. Captain Frank kept the only hotel, and was in this peculiar position: his guests could not possibly get away until he chose to take them. He usually counted heads before leaving Penzance, and laid in a stock of provisions accordingly. His customers were rounded-up like sheep in a South American corral, and there were no means of escape unless one swam across. There you were willy nilly, and, somehow or other, the weather never pointed to set fair until all the provisions had been consumed, and to avoid semi-starvation it was necessary to go back to the mainland to replenish the larder.”

Tourism on Scilly started in earnest once the Cornwall Railway link from Penzance to London was completed in 1859.

The steamer Little Western took the place of the Ariadne and, for the first time, visitors could make the crossing from Penzance in only four hours - considerably faster than the cutter Ariadne, which could take a day or two. The Little Western was the Isles of Scilly's first Steam Packet boat and made around three voyages from Scilly to Penzance and back each week.

Captain Tregarthen was captain of the Little Western from 1859-1870. The Little Western was a small ship, and her crew consisted of only five hands – captain, mate, engineer, deck-hand and stoker. Despite the challenges and perils of the voyage, she usually made good passage to the islands, and was able to provide service all year round.

Transferred to the West Cornwall Steam Ship Company in 1871, for the sum of £2,640 (equivalent to £268,863 in 2025), the Little Western was wrecked on the Wells Reef on 6 October 1872 attempting to give aid to a disabled brigantine.

The Little Western played a significant part in the history of the islands as well as the heritage of Tregarthen's Hotel. That is why the hotel's logo used to feature an image of the Little Western and the terrace at the hotel was at one point named The Little Western Deck.

A fire broke out at the hotel on Sunday 26 February 1905 when a defective chimney took fire and this spread to an adjoining bedroom. Fortunately, the fire was extinguished but the damage amounted to £50.

During the First World War, Tregarthen's Hotel was commandeered by the Admiralty and acted as a Ward Room for officers who were billeted at the White House on the Garrison. Tregarthen's Hotel was commissioned by the Admiralty on 1 June 1918 and surrendered on 28 February 1919. Commander HW Randall RNR was the Senior Officer.

The present day Tregarthen's Hotel has been built around the original living quarters of Captain Frank Tregarthen . The hotel has 31 bedrooms, 6 cottages and 4 recently built waterfront lodges for guests to enjoy.

== Famous visitors ==
Wilkie Collins stayed at Tregarthen's for one night in 1855 during a twelve-day cruise of the Scillies .

Alfred, Lord Tennyson wrote Enoch Arden during his stay at Tregarthen's Hotel in 1860. This is celebrated with a plaque at the hotel .

In around 1903 the hotel hosted the infamous killer Dr Crippen and his wife Cora (aka the aspiring music hall performer Belle Elmore). Indeed, during his stay Dr Crippen safely delivered his boatman's wife's baby daughter .

Prince Charles visited Tregarthen's Hotel on two occasions for meetings with the Duchy Tenants Association. His most recent visit to the islands with the Duchess of Cornwall was in August 2012 to see the new school, which he helped design.

Queen Elizabeth II visited the hotel on 3 June 2011, when Tregarthen's Hotel hosted an official reception for ninety people.

Queen Camilla took lunch on the terrace at Tregarthen's Hotel on 20th July 2021, during a visit by the then Prince of Wales to St Mary's.

== Ownership ==
Tregarthen's remained a family owned and run business until 15 February 1915 when a company was formed with a Penzance estate agent, WH Lane, followed by his son Thurstan T Lane, as chairmen. The hotel remained in the same ownership for a century, with WH Lane's grandson, Jonathan Lane, becoming Director in 1980 and then Chairman. On 24 April 2015, Tregarthen's Hotel was sold to Nigel and Jackie Wolstenholme, for whom it is a first hotel venture. Other business interests of Nigel and Jackie Wolstenholme include the 25 acre Somborne Valley Vineyard in Hampshire.

== Gig racing ==
Tregarthen's Hotel supports the popular sport of Cornish pilot gig racing. In 1999 the hotel donated a pilot gig called Tregarthen's to the Isles of Scilly Rowing Association to celebrate the hotel's 150th anniversary. The hotel donated and launched a second gig to the Association in 2012 during the World Pilot Gig Championships, which are held annually on the first Bank Holiday each May since 1989.
