= Porthloo =

Coordinates: 49.9231°N 6.3076°W

Porthloo: Cornish: Porth Logh
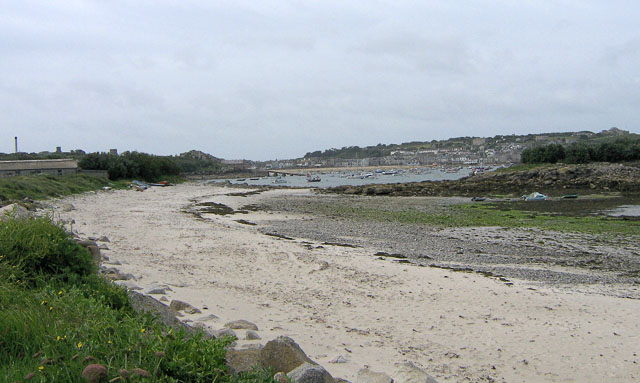
- Porthloo beach

- Location within Isles of Scilly
- OS grid reference: SV909114
- Civil parish: St Mary's
- Unitary authority: Isles of Scilly
- Ceremonial county: Cornwall
- Region: South West
- Country: England
- Sovereign state: United Kingdom
- Post town: ISLES OF SCILLY
- Postcode district: TR21
- Dialling code: 01720
- Police: Devon and Cornwall
- Fire: Isles of Scilly
- Ambulance: South Western
- UK Parliament: St Ives

Porthloo (sometimes spelled and often pronounced Porthlow; Cornish: Porth Logh "cove of the deep water inlet") is a coastal settlement on the island of St Mary's in the Isles of Scilly, England. It is situated about half a mile northeast of Hugh Town and is a popular tourist spot with a number of guest houses, a restaurant, several gift shops and art galleries.

The only golf club on the Isles of Scilly is situated just to the north of Porthloo. The course consists of nine holes, each with two tees. The club was founded in 1904 and the course and clubhouse are open to visitors.

== Beach ==
Porthloo Beach faces west - there are two tidal islets called Taylor's Island and Newford Island which are to the north and south of the beach respectively. At the top of the beach is a small remnant sand dune system with the grassy area behind used for boat standing and repairs. Due to the disturbance hairy buttercup (Ranunculus sardous), along with other arable weeds appear here in one of its few sites on Scilly, and the only known site for wall–rue (Asplenium ruta-muraria) in the Isles of Scilly is just to the south. Porthloo is within an Area of Outstanding Natural Beauty, is a Geological Conservation Review site and was designated a Site of Special Scientific Interest (SSSI) in 1996. All of the land designated as Porthloo SSSI is owned by the Duchy of Cornwall. The 0.66 hectares (1.6 acres) site is notified for a succession of Quaternary sediments listed below with youngest at the top of the list:

- Aeolian loess deposits dated to 18,000 years BP (before present)
- Head deposits with breccia recognised as the type locality and known as the Porthloo Breccia. Dated to the Late Devensian 30,000 BP the pollen from organic layers indicate a tundra climate
- Storm beach laid down during the Ipswichian interglacial which started 130,000 years ago and ended about 114,000 years ago.

== Boat yard ==
The Duchy of Cornwall runs a boat park at Porthloo, providing ground storage of boats.

== In television ==
The postbox at Porthloo Terrace was the starting point in a Top Gear challenge to race the Royal Mail's delivery of a letter to Orkney.
