= Holy Vale =

Coordinates: 49.9245°N 6.2925°W

Holy Vale: Cornish: Hal an Val
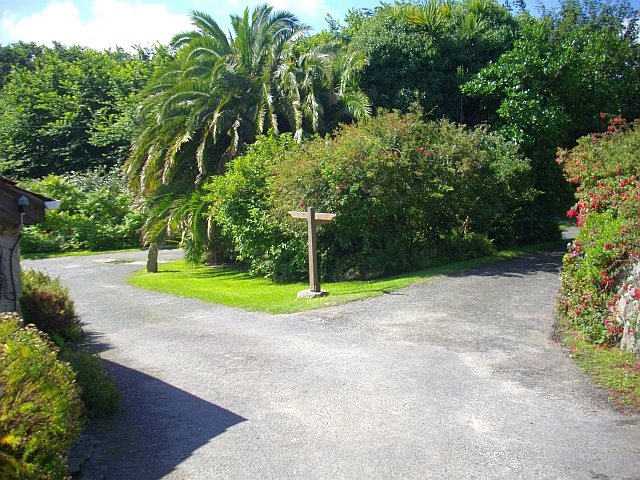
- The signpost at the centre of Holy Vale

- Location within Isles of Scilly
- Civil parish: St Mary's
- Unitary authority: Isles of Scilly
- Ceremonial county: Cornwall
- Region: South West
- Country: England
- Sovereign state: United Kingdom
- Post town: ISLES OF SCILLY
- Postcode district: TR21
- Dialling code: 01720
- Police: Devon and Cornwall
- Fire: Isles of Scilly
- Ambulance: South Western
- UK Parliament: St Ives

Holy Vale (Cornish: Hal an Val, meaning marsh of the vale) is a minor valley and small settlement within, on the island of St Mary's, the largest of the Isles of Scilly, England. Situated inland, nearby are Maypole and Longstone.

The name Holy Vale was originally La Val in 1301, it comes from the Norman French for low lying, at the foot.

The settlement of Holy Vale lies in the upper part of the valley, which leads down to the Higher Moors and Porth Hellick on the southeast coast of the island. The centre of the settlement, where there is a small junction and a signpost, is at an elevation of 12 metres (39 ft) above sea level.

It was the scene of the murder of 18-year-old Stephen Menheniott by his father in 1976.

The only commercial vineyard on St Mary's is centred in Holy Vale, with the vines located in several small fields in the area.
