= Longstone, Isles of Scilly =

Coordinates: 49.9215°N 6.296°W

Longstone
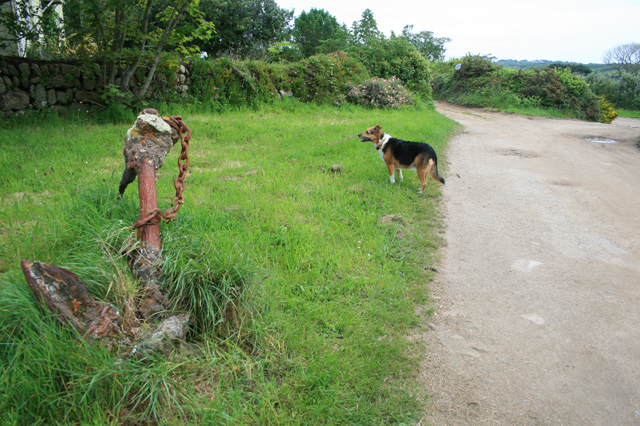
- An old ship's anchor buried by the side of the lane in Longstone

- Location within Isles of Scilly
- Civil parish: St Mary's
- Unitary authority: Isles of Scilly
- Ceremonial county: Cornwall
- Region: South West
- Country: England
- Sovereign state: United Kingdom
- Post town: ISLES OF SCILLY
- Postcode district: TR21
- Dialling code: 01720
- Police: Devon and Cornwall
- Fire: Isles of Scilly
- Ambulance: South Western
- UK Parliament: St Ives

Longstone is small settlement on the island of St Mary's, the largest of the Isles of Scilly, England. Nearby is Holy Vale and Rocky Hill. Longstone is located inland, at the approximate geographic centre of the island.

In Longstone is Carreg Dhu Garden, a publicly accessible 1.5 acres (0.61 ha) garden set in a former quarry, maintained by volunteers.

On the site of the former Heritage Centre, which was closed and put up for sale in the summer of 2011, a cafe was opened in 2018, with an extension called Longstone Lodge opening as a hostel (sleeping accommodation in a private room or a dormitory, with shared kitchen and living area).
