= Garrison Tower =

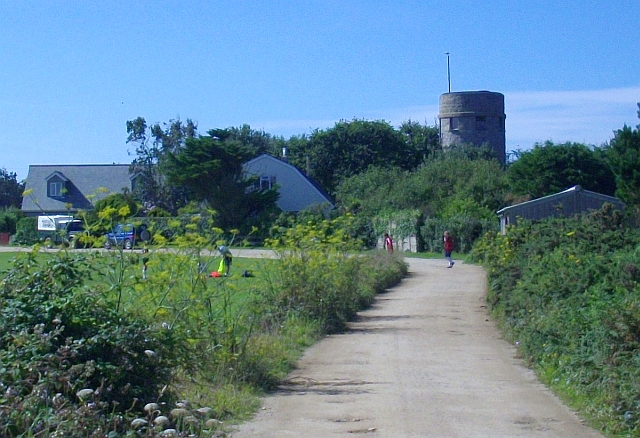
- Garrison Tower in 2008

- Location within Isles of Scilly
- 49.912528°N 6.322422°W
- Location: St Mary's, Isles of Scilly, England

Listed Building – Grade II
- Official name: Garrison Tower
- Designated: 14 December 1992
- Reference no.: 1328847

Garrison Tower is a Grade II listed structure on St Mary's, Isles of Scilly

The tower was built in the 17th century as a windmill. By 1750 it was abandoned and in a ruined condition. The remains were converted to a lookout tower in the 1830s by HM Coastguard.

In 1869, the Shipping and Mercantile Gazette obtained it as a lookout post to report shipping movements. It was taken over by Lloyd's of London in 1871.
