= Wesleyan Methodist Church, Hugh Town =

Wesleyan Methodist Church, Hugh Town, Isles of Scilly
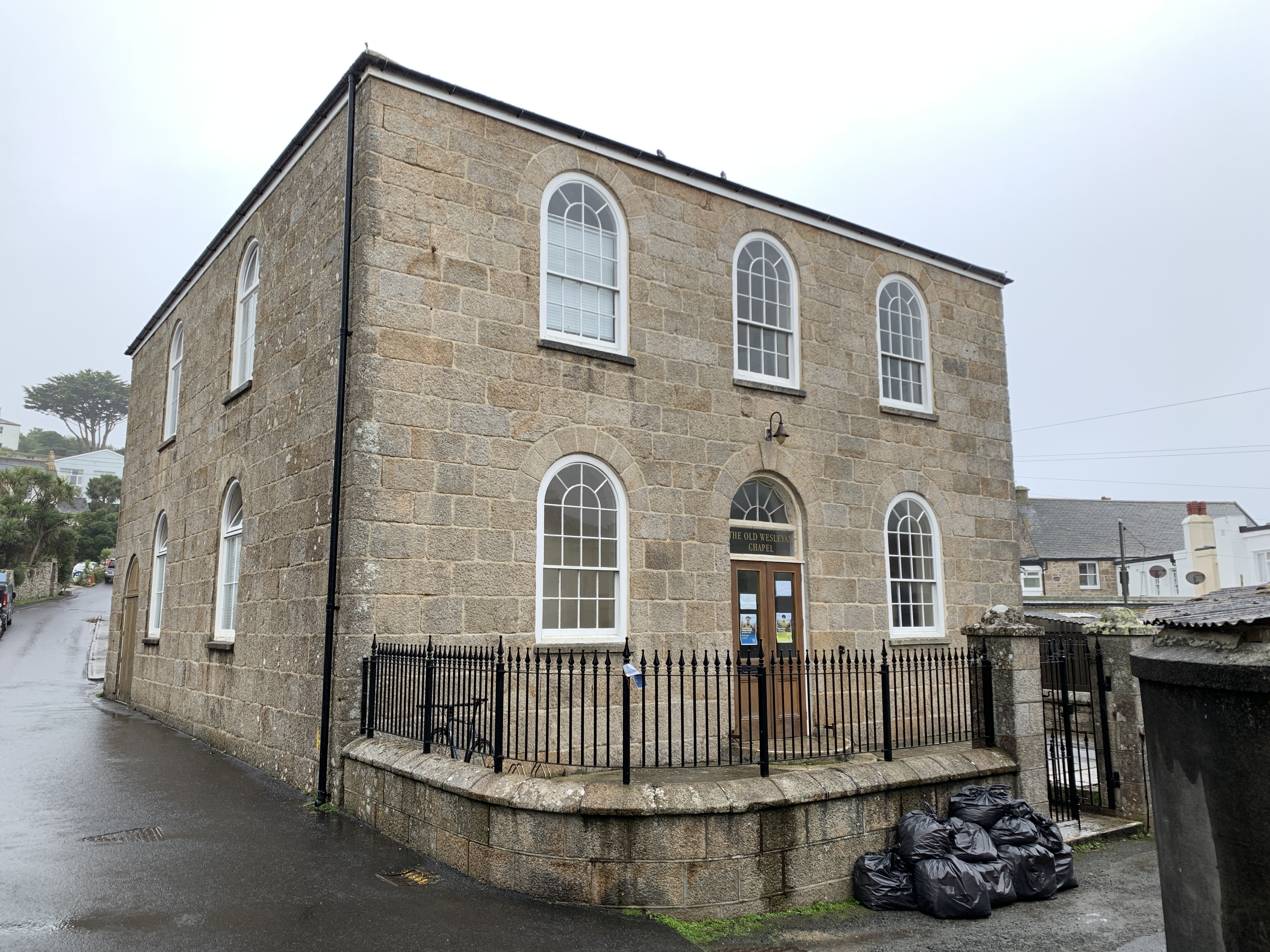
- Wesleyan Methodist Church, Hugh Town, Isles of Scilly
- Wesleyan Methodist Church, Hugh Town, Isles of Scilly
- 49°54′52.58″N 6°18′59.6″W
- Location: Hugh Town, Isles of Scilly
- Country: England
- Denomination: Wesleyan Methodist

History
- Founded: 1790

Listed Building – Grade II
- Official name: Former Wesleyan Methodist Chapel
- Designated: 6 June 1986
- Reference no.: 1141217

Wesleyan Methodist Church, Hugh Town, Isles of Scilly was a Wesleyan Methodist church in Hugh Town, Isles of Scilly from 1790. It is currently Grade II listed and functions as an office of the Council of the Isles of Scilly.

== History ==
The first building on the site was erected in 1790, but this was replaced in 1828 by the current building.

The church was renovated in 1884. The body of the chapel was reseated and a rostrum and communion-rail added. The front of the gallery was painted white, relieved with gold. With the addition of a school room the works cost £500.

The church was renovated again in 1905.

In the 1930s, the church merged with the Bible Christians, and the decision was taken to use the new building on Church Street. Worship ended and the building was left empty. The rostrum and communion rail were moved and installed in the Church Street chapel.

== Organ ==
Music was originally provided by a flute, bass viol and clarionet. Later a harmonium was used until in 1905 the church installed a pipe organ by Messrs Heard of Truro.
