= St Mary's Methodist Church, Isles of Scilly =

St Mary’s Methodist Church, Hugh Town, Isles of Scilly
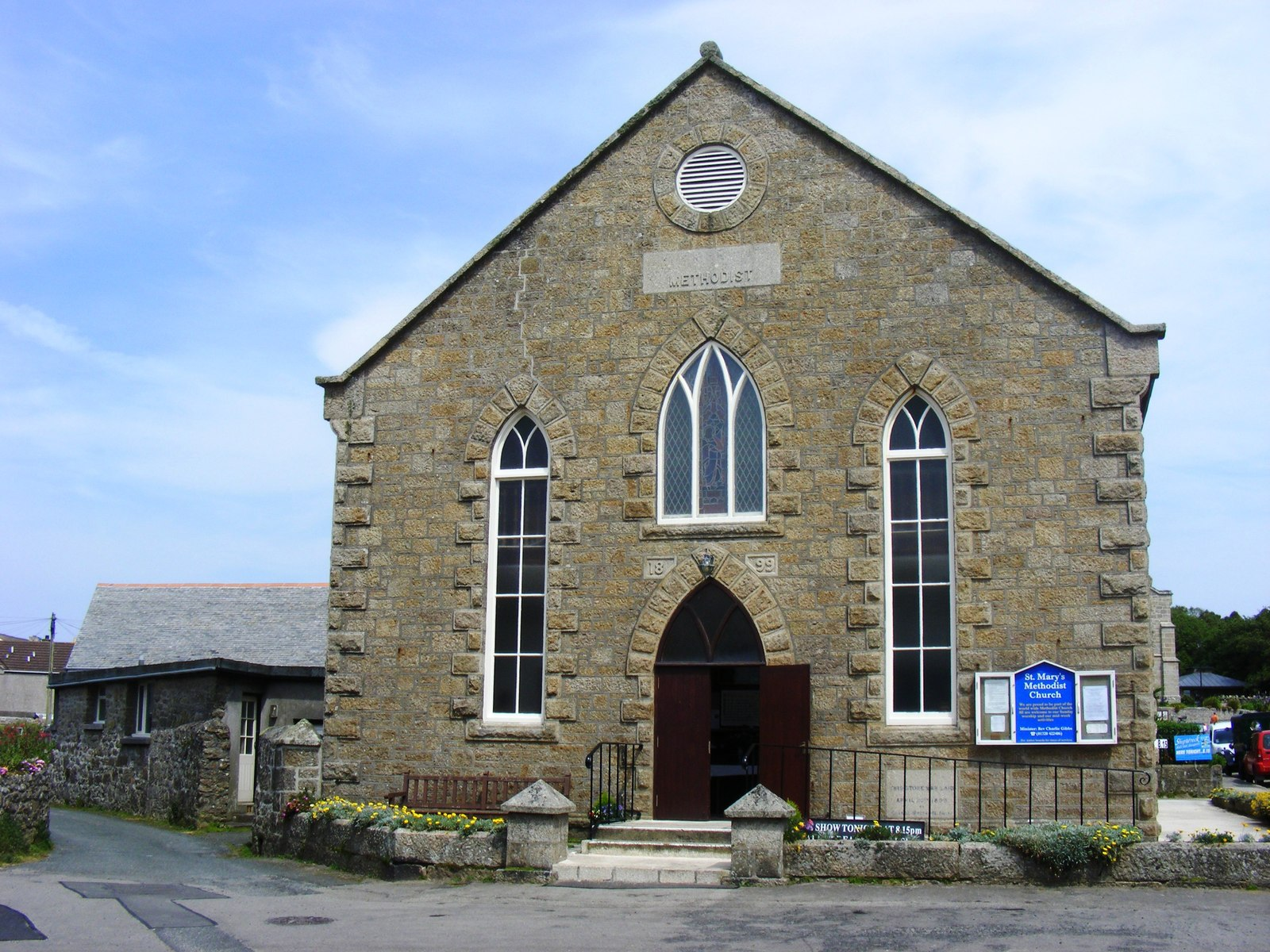
- St Mary’s Methodist Church, Hugh Town, Isles of Scilly
- St Mary’s Methodist Church, Hugh Town, Isles of Scilly
- 49°54′53.9″N 6°18′44″W
- OS grid reference: SV 90547 10560
- Location: Hugh Town, Isles of Scilly
- Country: England
- Denomination: Methodist
- Previous denomination: Bible Christian

Architecture
- Architect: A.J. Trenear
- Groundbreaking: 1899

Listed Building – Grade II
- Official name: Church of St Mary (Methodist)
- Designated: 14 December 1992
- Reference no.: 1218680

St Mary's Methodist Church, Hugh Town is a Methodist church in Hugh Town, Isles of Scilly. It is currently Grade II listed.

== History ==
Bible Christians arrived in the islands and began preaching from the Bishop and Wolf Inn. The first chapel was built on Church Street in Hugh Town around 1836 (and is now used as the Masonic Hall).

The current chapel was built at a cost of around £1,300 (equivalent to £144,400 in 2025) between 1899 and 1900 to the designs of the architect A. J. Trenear. The foundation stone was laid on Thursday 20 April 1899 in the presence of Rev. W. B. Lark, President of the Bible Christian Conference. The Governor of the Islands, T. A. Dorrien-Smith, agreed to take the old chapel which adjoined the St Mary's Girls’ day school and build a new Sunday school adjoining the chapel. Alfred Trenear was contracted for carpentering, painting and glazing at £746, and Messrs John Ellis and Son were contracted for the masonry and plastering at £444. Local famers carted stone from the quarry free of charge. The chapel was built to seat 350 people, 198 on the ground floor and 152 in the gallery.

George Woodcock of Church Street, St Mary's, laid the principal foundation stone. Jabez Gibson of St Martin's laid the Visitors stone. Miss Ada Jenkins of St Mary's laid a stone on behalf of the Christian Endeavour, and Norman and George Roberts laid the Sunday-school stone.

In the 1930s, it merged with the Wesleyan Methodist Church and the rostrum and communion rail were moved from the Wesleyan Chapel and installed in the Church Street chapel.

== Organ ==
The pipe organ by Hele and Company of Plymouth was installed in 1910.

== See also ==
- St Martin's Methodist Church, Isles of Scilly
