= Telegraph, Isles of Scilly =

Coordinates: 49.929°N 6.303°W

Telegraph: Cornish: Brebellskrif
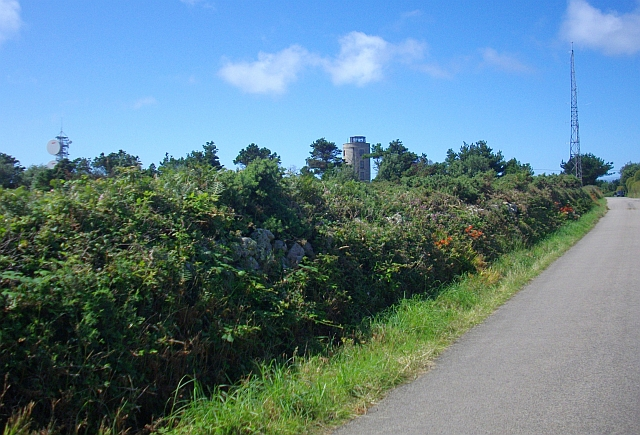
- Old and modern communication towers & masts in the Telegraph area

- Location within Isles of Scilly
- Civil parish: St Mary's
- Unitary authority: Isles of Scilly
- Ceremonial county: Cornwall
- Region: South West
- Country: England
- Sovereign state: United Kingdom
- Post town: ISLES OF SCILLY
- Postcode district: TR21
- Dialling code: 01720
- Police: Devon and Cornwall
- Fire: Isles of Scilly
- Ambulance: South Western
- UK Parliament: St Ives

Telegraph (Cornish: Brebellskrif) is a settlement on St Mary's, the largest of the Isles of Scilly, England.

Telegraph is located in the north west of the island and is the highest point on St Mary's and in the Isles of Scilly, at 51 metres (167 ft) above sea level. The settlement takes its name from Telegraph Tower, situated at the summit of the hill.

== History of telegraph communication to Scilly ==
In the late 1860s, Mr. Buxton of Scilly attempted to persuade the Post Office to install a telegraph cable to the Isles of Scilly. However, the Post Office declined and it was decided that a private company should undertake the project. Ashurst, Morris and Company of Old Jewry, London were contracted by the Scilly Islands Telegraph Company. They entered into a contract with Mr. Fenwick of Gateshead (who had been responsible for the first submarine cable between Dover and Calais, which was completed on 25 September 1851). The core of the Scilly cable consisted of three copper wires, insulated by India-rubber, and was manufactured by the Silvertown Company. The outer covering was composed of six strands of Manilla hemp, through each of which ran a galvanised iron wire. The cable weight was 17 long hundredweight (860 kg) per mile, with a breaking strain of 3.5 long tons (3,600 kg). 1.5 miles (2.4 km) of each end of the wire was bound with galvanized iron wire, to protect against chafing on rocks, bringing the weight to 4 long tons (4,100 kg) per mile.

On 22 September 1869, the steamer Resolute of Newcastle, arrived at Penzance with the telegraph cable to connect Land’s End to the Isles of Scilly. The cable was 30.5 miles (49.1 km) long without a single splice, and was the first piece of this length that was made. On Saturday, 25 September 1869, the steamer Fusilier, under Captain Jacques, arrived opposite Mill Bay, a small cove about 1.5 miles (2.4 km) south of Land’s End. Rockets were used to convey a rope ashore. The cable on the ship was attached to this rope and hauled ashore to make the land connection at Zawn Reeth. Cable laying was completed by Sunday 26 September 1869 when the cable reached Deep Point, beneath the high lands of Normandy on St Mary’s.

The cable broke in mid-1870 and had to be repaired. The cost of sending a 20-word message from Penzance to the Isles of Scilly was 2s 6d (equivalent to £15.11 in 2023). A second cable, manufactured by the Telegraph Construction and Maintenance Company was laid in 1870, allowing messages to be sent or received from any Postal Telegraph Office in the United Kingdom. The cost of sending a 20-word message using this system was an additional 1s (equivalent to £6.04 in 2023) per message on top of the Scilly Islands Telegraph Company charge of 2s 6d. On 28 June 1870, a branch was opened to Tresco.

The cable was used initially for shipowners and merchants to communicate with their vessels moored in the Islands, and was also used to send weather observations to the mainland.

The cable service failed in 1876 and the Scilly Islands Telegraph Company did not have the resources to repair it. Eventually the Post Office agreed to purchase and repair it and they took over the assets of the Scilly company on 24 April 1879. The cost of messages was reduced to 1s for the first 20 words, and then 3d for every additional 5 words.

== Current use ==
The only golf club on the Isles of Scilly is situated between Telegraph and the coast to the west. The course consists of nine holes, each with two tees. The club was founded in 1904 and is open to visitors.

HM Coastguard had a station at Telegraph until 2017.

McFarland's Down is a linear settlement that grew in the latter half of the 20th century and is to the immediate north of Telegraph.
