= Porth Hellick =

Coordinates: 49.9159°N 6.2844°W

Porth Hellick: Cornish: Porth Helyk
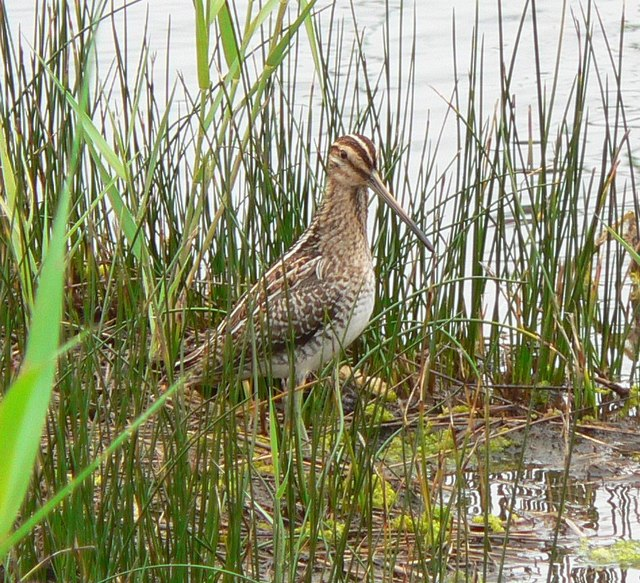
- A snipe at Porth Hellick Pool

- Location within Isles of Scilly
- OS grid reference: SV925105
- Unitary authority: Isles of Scilly
- Ceremonial county: Cornwall
- Region: South West
- Country: England
- Sovereign state: United Kingdom
- Post town: ISLES OF SCILLY
- Postcode district: TR21
- Dialling code: 01720
- Police: Devon and Cornwall
- Fire: Isles of Scilly
- Ambulance: South Western
- UK Parliament: St Ives

Porth Hellick (Cornish: Porth Helyk, meaning willows cove) is a tidal inlet on the south coast of St Mary’s, the largest island in the Isles of Scilly.

The bay is delineated to the south by a headland known as the Giant’s Castle, which is an Iron Age cliff fort, and Porth Hellick Down and Porth Hellick Point to the north. At low tide a wide expanse of sand and rocks are exposed and a bar of fine shingle provides a barrier from the sea to form the largest area of (usually) fresh water on St Mary’s. A stream rises in Holy Vale and flows south through Higher Moors to the sea at Porth Hellick. In its half-mile length it falls less than 25 feet and has barely cut a river bed through the marsh; but feeds the pool with fresh water.

The area is an important feeding station for migrating and wintering birds and was designated as the Higher Moors and Porth Hellick Pool (St Mary's) Site of Special Scientific Interest (SSSI) for the ″wide diversity of habitats with several rare and notable plant species″ in 1971. All of the land designated as the Higher Moors and Porth Hellick Pool (St Mary's) SSSI is owned by the Duchy of Cornwall.

== Natural history ==
Higher Moors and Porth Hellick Pool SSSI is one of the three main freshwater wetland areas on Scilly. The wetland is fed by ground water and a small steam to form a mosaic of willow and alder scrub, mire and pools. The peat deposits were once a fuel source and are rich in pollen. Along with other paleo-environmental evidence the deposits provide information about the vegetational history of the islands since the Mesolithic. The area is important as a feeding ground for migrating and wintering birds and for summer visitors and waterfowl. Reed Warbler and Sedge Warbler nest in the common reed which grows along the margins of the pools and Coot, Gadwall, Mallard and Moorhen, Teal and Water Rail also breed. The moors were once grazed and the fields have a rich wet grassland flora with Greater Tussock-sedge, Hemlock Water-dropwort, Purple Loosestrife, Royal Fern, Water Mint and Yellow Iris. The acidic boggy areas support Bog Pimpernel, Bog Stitchwort and Marsh St John’s-wort with Lesser Spearwort in the wetter areas.

== See also ==
- Lower Moors (St Mary's)
