= St Mary's, Isles of Scilly =

Coordinates: 49.922°N 6.297°W

St Mary's: Cornish: An Nor
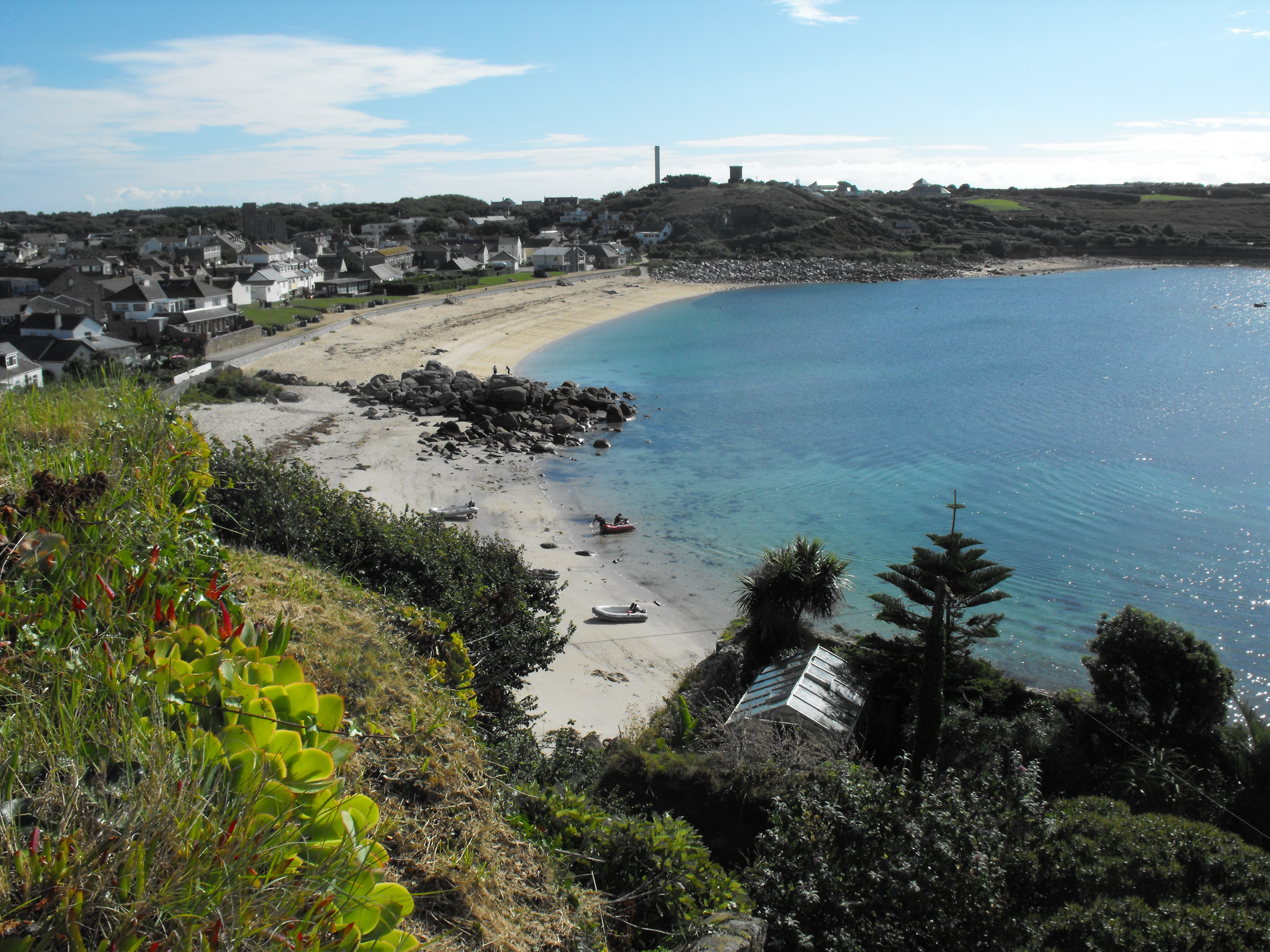
- Porthcressa, showing part of Hugh Town

- Location within Isles of Scilly
- Area: 6.58 km^{2} (2.54 sq mi)
- Population: 1,723 (2011)
  - Density: 262/km^{2} (680/sq mi)
- OS grid reference: SV915115
- Civil parish: St Mary's
- Unitary authority: Isles of Scilly
- Ceremonial county: Cornwall
- Region: South West
- Country: England
- Sovereign state: United Kingdom
- Post town: ISLES OF SCILLY
- Postcode district: TR21
- Dialling code: 01720
- Police: Devon and Cornwall
- Fire: Isles of Scilly
- Ambulance: South Western
- UK Parliament: St Ives

St Mary's (Cornish: An Nor, lit. 'the land') is the largest and most populous island of the Isles of Scilly, an archipelago in Cornwall, England, United Kingdom.

== Description ==
St Mary's (in red) and the other Isles of Scilly

St Mary's has an area of 6.58 square kilometres (2.54 mi^{2}) — 40 percent of the total land area of the Isles of Scilly — this includes four small tidal islands which connect with St Mary's at low tide: Toll's Island, Taylor's Island, Newford Island and the island at Innisidgen.

With a population of 1,723 (out of a total population for Scilly of 2,203) St Mary's is relatively densely populated, with twice the average population density of the Isles of Scilly as a whole. The majority of St Mary's residents live in the western half of the island, with Hugh Town alone having a population of 1,097.

The main settlement, Hugh Town (Cornish: Tre Huw), was sold to the inhabitants by the Crown in 1949 (it had belonged to the Duchy of Cornwall — which still owns much of the rest of the island). Other settlements on the island are Old Town, Porthloo, Pelistry, Trenoweth, Holy Vale, Maypole, Normandy, Longstone, Rocky Hill and Telegraph.

The island became the home of British Prime Minister Harold Wilson and his final resting place after his death in 1995. His grave is at the cemetery at Old Town Church.

=== Civil parish and ward ===
St Mary's is one of the five civil parishes of the Isles of Scilly, which are also wards. St Mary's returns 12 councillors to the Council of the Isles of Scilly; this compares with 1 councillor for each of the four "off-island" wards. The civil parish is not functional however, and there is no council or meeting.

== Transport ==
St Mary's is the only island of the Isles of Scilly with a significant road network and the only island with public highways, including three A roads (measuring 4 3/4 miles or 7.5 kilometres in total length) which are numbered in Zone 3 of the British numbering scheme (the A3110, A3111 and A3112); these 'A' roads are generally country lanes in nature. Roads and streets across Scilly have very few signs or markings, and route numbers are not marked at all.

In 2005 there were 619 cars and vans on St Mary's; the island also has taxis and a conducted bus tour. Vehicles in Scilly are exempt from annual MOT tests.

By air, the island is served by St Mary's Airport. Fixed-wing aircraft services are scheduled, operated by Isles of Scilly Skybus, to and from Land's End, Newquay, and (except in winter) Exeter. Helicopter services were operated by British International Helicopters, from Penzance Heliport; this service, which started in 1964 (then operated by BEA Helicopters), ceased at the end of October 2012.

Helicopter flights resumed in 2020 with the launch of the Penzance Helicopter service.

By sea, the Isles of Scilly Steamship Company provides a passenger and cargo service from Penzance, which is currently operated by the Scillonian III passenger ferry, supported by the Gry Maritha cargo vessel. The other islands are linked to St. Mary's by a network of inter-island launches operated by the St Mary's Boatmen's Association. The main harbour of St Mary's (and the Isles of Scilly) is at Hugh Town, and is called St Mary's Harbour. Further slipways and small quays exist around the island, at natural harbour sites, such as at Old Town, Pendrathen, Watermill Cove, and Porthloo.

=== RNLI ===
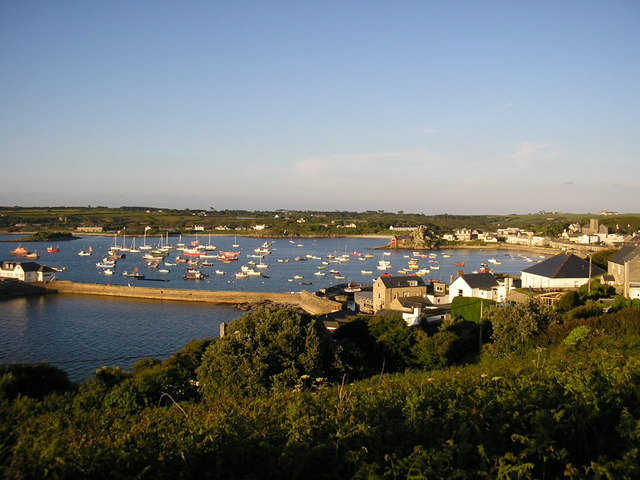
The harbour at Hugh Town, looking east; the quay is where the Scillonian III berths.

There has been an RNLI lifeboat station on St Mary's since 1837. The first two lifeboats were kept in a boathouse on the town beach at Hugh Town. Following closure in 1855 the lifeboat station was re-opened in 1874 and a boathouse was built on the beach at Porth Cressa. In 1899 a new boathouse and slipway were built at Carn Thomas and the first motor boat arrived in 1919.

The lifeboatmen of St Mary's have earned 26 RNLI medals for bravery, comprising one gold, nine silver and 16 bronze, the last awarded in 2004.

== Churches ==
There are Anglican churches such as St Mary's Church, St Mary's and St Mary's Old Church, St Mary's.

John Wesley preached here on 13 September 1743. The Wesleyan Methodist Society was established in 1788 and the first chapel erected in 1790. This was replaced in 1828. The present Methodist church was built in 1899 by A.J. Trenear in Hugh Town and is part of the Isles of Scilly Methodist Circuit.

== Cornish Wrestling ==
Captain James Williams White (1826-1903), the champion Cornish wrestler, was born on St Mary's and after emigrating lived in Burra, South Australia, from 1856.

== Landmarks ==
=== Telegraph Tower ===
The tower on Newford Down, now known as Telegraph Tower, was built in 1814 to serve as an Admiralty Telegraph Station, but it had closed by 1816. The building then reverted to the custody of the landowner - the Duke of Leeds. In 1831 the site was taken over by the Coastguard as a subsidiary to the main station situated on the Garrison. In 1903 a wireless mast and receiving office were built nearby, and in 1908 a telegraph house was erected on the tower's roof. The wider site was developed into a modern radio transmitting and communications site by the late-C20. The tower is now a private residence. It was at this tower about 1898 that Guglielmo Marconi heard wireless signals transmitted from Porthcurno, a distance of 30 miles. It was used by Radio Scilly for broadcasting.

Note: To strengthen Scilly's defences Major Daniel Lyman proposed the construction of three gun towers in 1803, each armed with a 32-pounder carronade on top. The presence of three towers on St Mary's, in the heart of the Garrison, on Buzza Hill and at Newford Down, has led some writers to link them to Lyman's proposal. However, his proposal was never enacted, and the three towers have different origins.

=== Harry's Walls ===
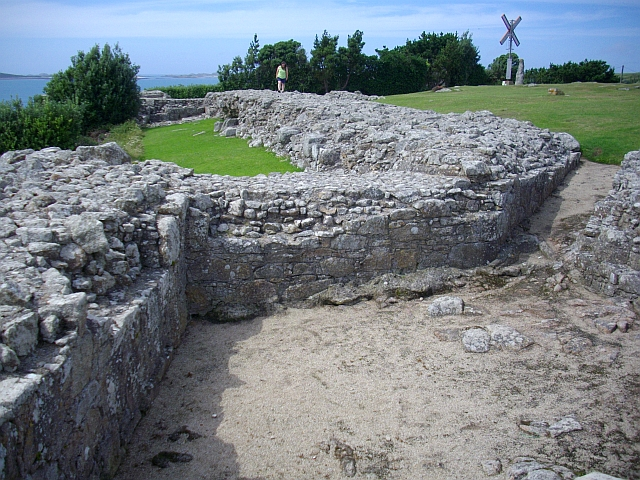
Harry's Walls, St. Mary's

Harry's Walls are the remains of an unfinished artillery castle situated on a hilltop to the north-east of Hugh Town. It was begun in 1551 as part of a major phase of fortification on the Isles of Scilly, undertaken to counter threats from the French. It was left unfinished because the site was recognised to be unsuitable.

=== Giant's Castle ===
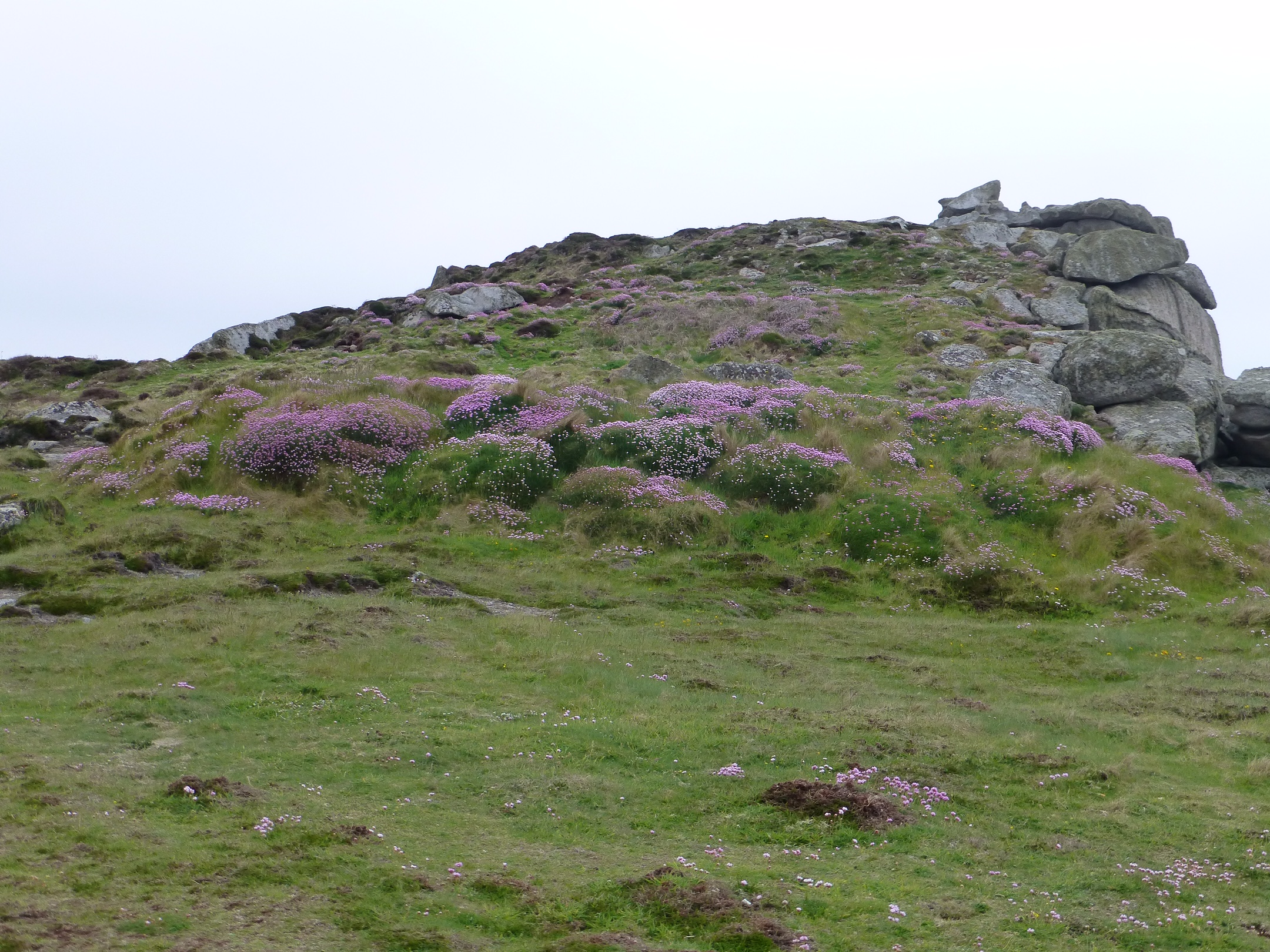
Giant's Castle in 2013

Giant's Castle is an Iron Age cliff castle on the coastal path between the airfield and Porth Hellick Bay.

=== The Garrison and Star Castle ===
Star Castle is at the centre of a fortification system around the west side of St Mary's known as the Garrison. The walls of the castle take the shape of an eight-pointed star. It comprises an outer wall around the outcrop of Hew Hill, protecting the town and the castle, with strategically placed gun batteries at regular intervals around the outer wall, allowing covering fire at all angles. A redundant windmill was converted after 1831 into Garrison Tower as a lookout tower for HM Coastguard.

The Star Castle was built in 1593 by the Surveyor of the Royal Works and mapmaker Robert Adams (d.1595), under the direction of Francis Godolphin, following the Spanish Armada of 1588. Fearing another Spanish invasion, in May 1593 Queen Elizabeth I ordered the construction of a fort and two sconces as a lookout for any intruder ships.

In 1740 Master Gunner Abraham Tovey transformed the Garrison building walls with gun batteries, including Colonel Boscawen's Battery, in a circular shape following the coast line of The Hoe. Star Castle is now a hotel.

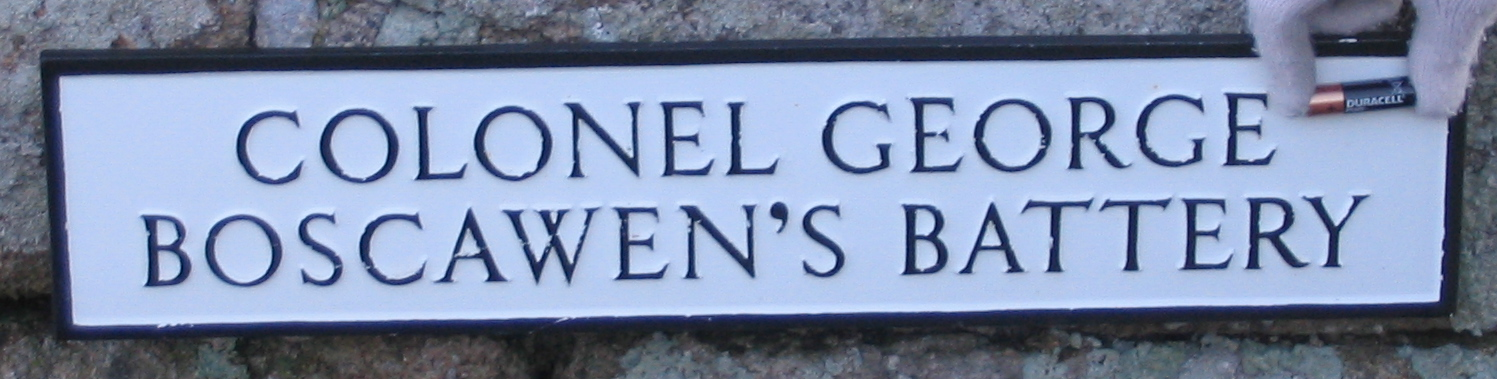
Name plate on Colonel George Boscawen's Battery

=== Peninnis Head ===
The 14 metre metal tower lighthouse on Peninnis Head was built in 1911 as a replacement for the 1680 lighthouse in the centre of St Agnes. The lighthouse was converted from acetylene gas to electricity in 1992 and the original range of 17 nautical miles was reduced to nine in 2011. The headland is within the Isles of Scilly Area of Outstanding Natural Beauty and part of the Heritage Coast. It is also a Geological Conservation Review site for its Quaternary geomorphology and was first designated a Site of Special Scientific Interest (SSSI) in 1971 for both its biological and geological interests.

=== Porthellick Cove ===
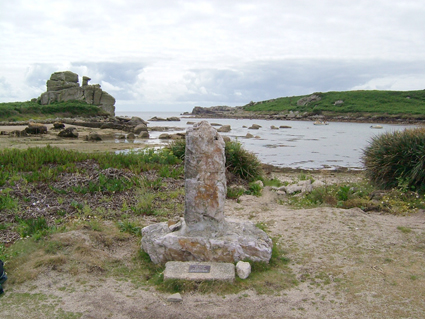
Memorial at Porthellick Cove where Shovell's body was washed ashore

Porthellick Cove contains a memorial to mark the spot where the body of Admiral Sir Cloudesley Shovell was washed ashore after the 1707 Scilly naval disaster. This was one of the greatest maritime disasters in British history, when four ships (Association, Firebrand, Romney and Eagle) with nearly 2,000 sailors were lost.

=== Other locations ===
The following is a list of some other locations on St Mary's:

- Lower Moors Nature Reserve
- Higher Moors Nature Reserve (see Porth Hellick)
- Holy Vale
- Porthloo Beach
- Watermill Cove
- Innisidgen Burial Chamber
- Isles of Scilly Golf Club, near Telegraph and Porthloo
St Mary's, Isles of Scilly

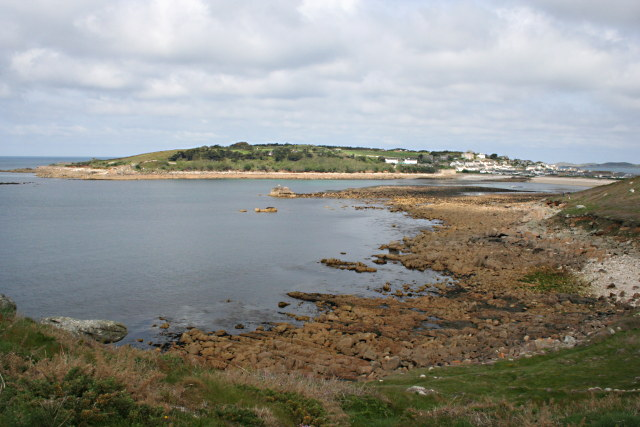
The Garrison, historically "the Hugh", looking across Porth Cressa

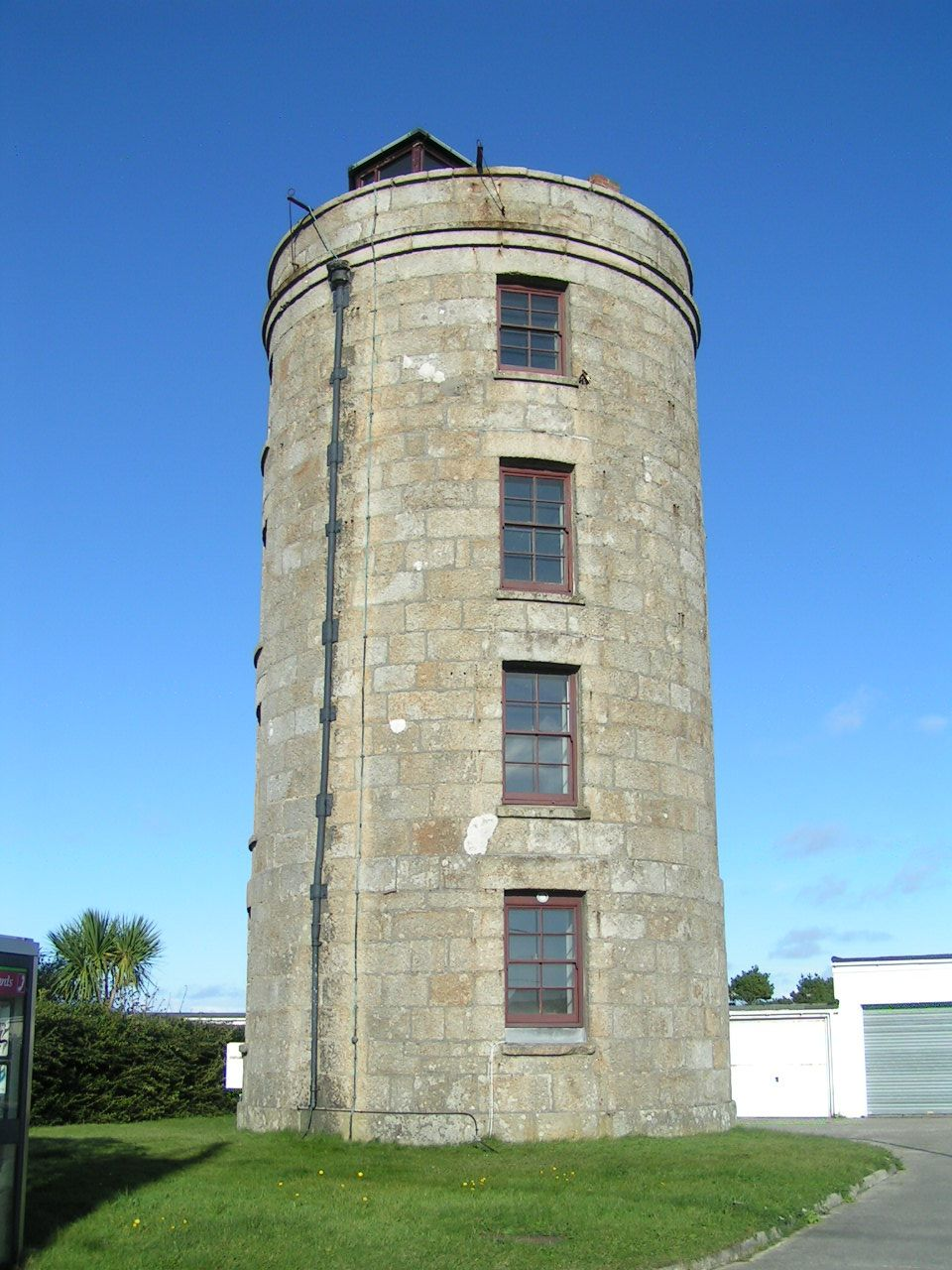
Telegraph Tower

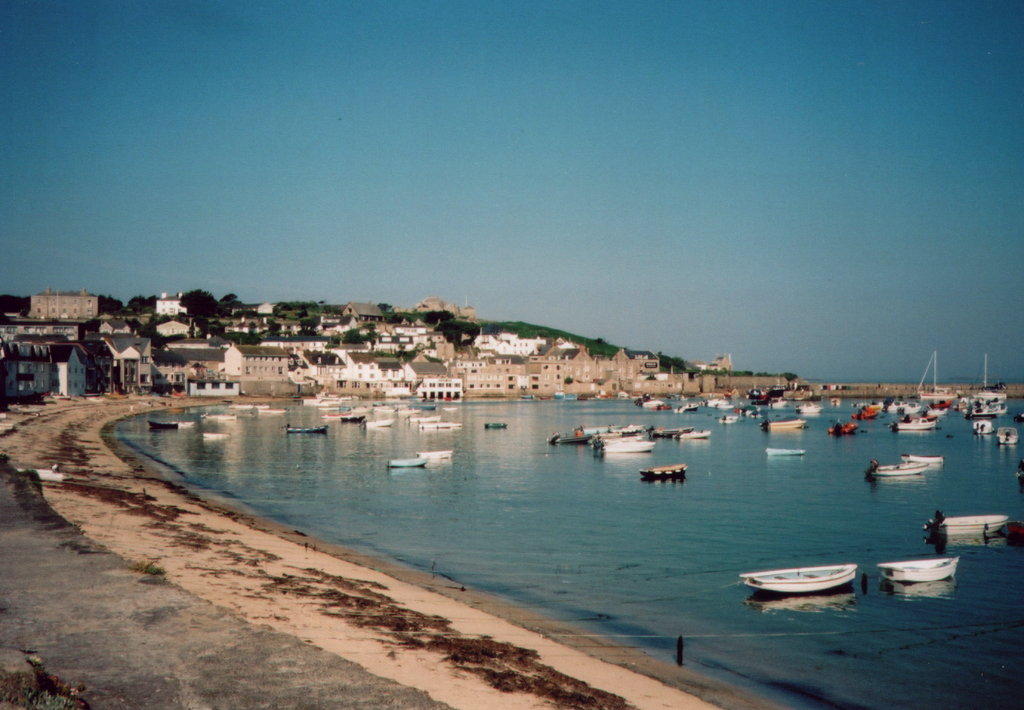
Hugh Town

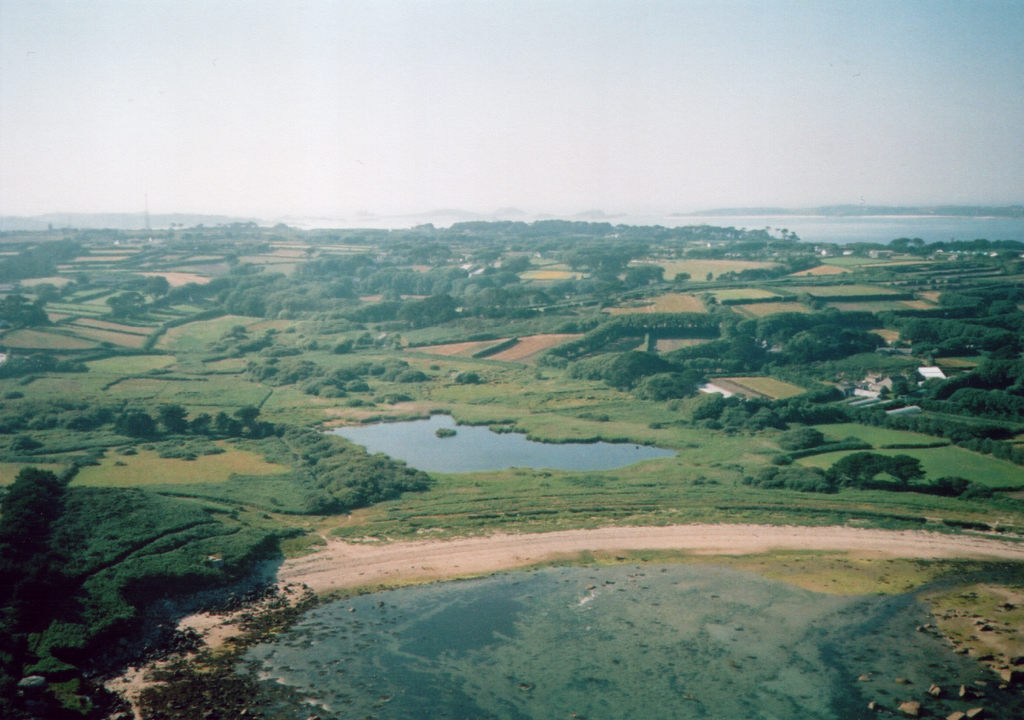
St Mary's from an aerial perspective; looking north from Porth Hellick up the Holy Vale

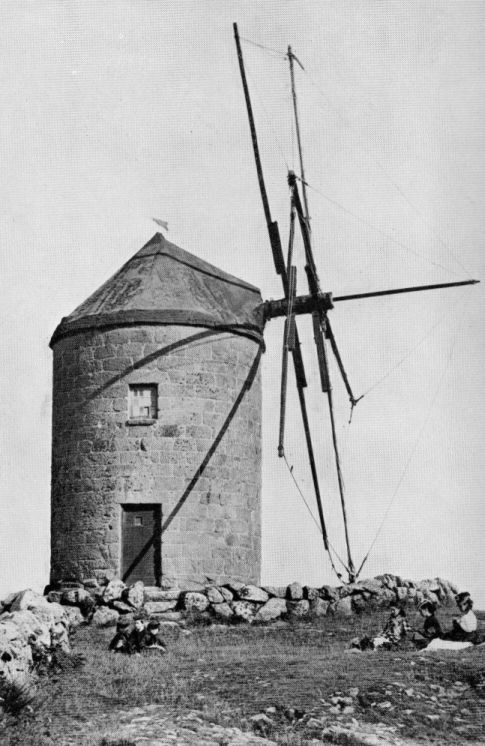
Spanish Windmill

== Population ==
Population
City	Population
1841	1,519(plus 26 in the Garrison)
1861	1,424
1871	1,368
1881	1,290
1891	1,201
1901	1,355
1911	1,376
1921	1,196
1931	1,216
1951	1,625
1961	1,736
1971	1,958
1981	2,073
1991	1,600
2001	1,666
2011	1,723

== Education ==
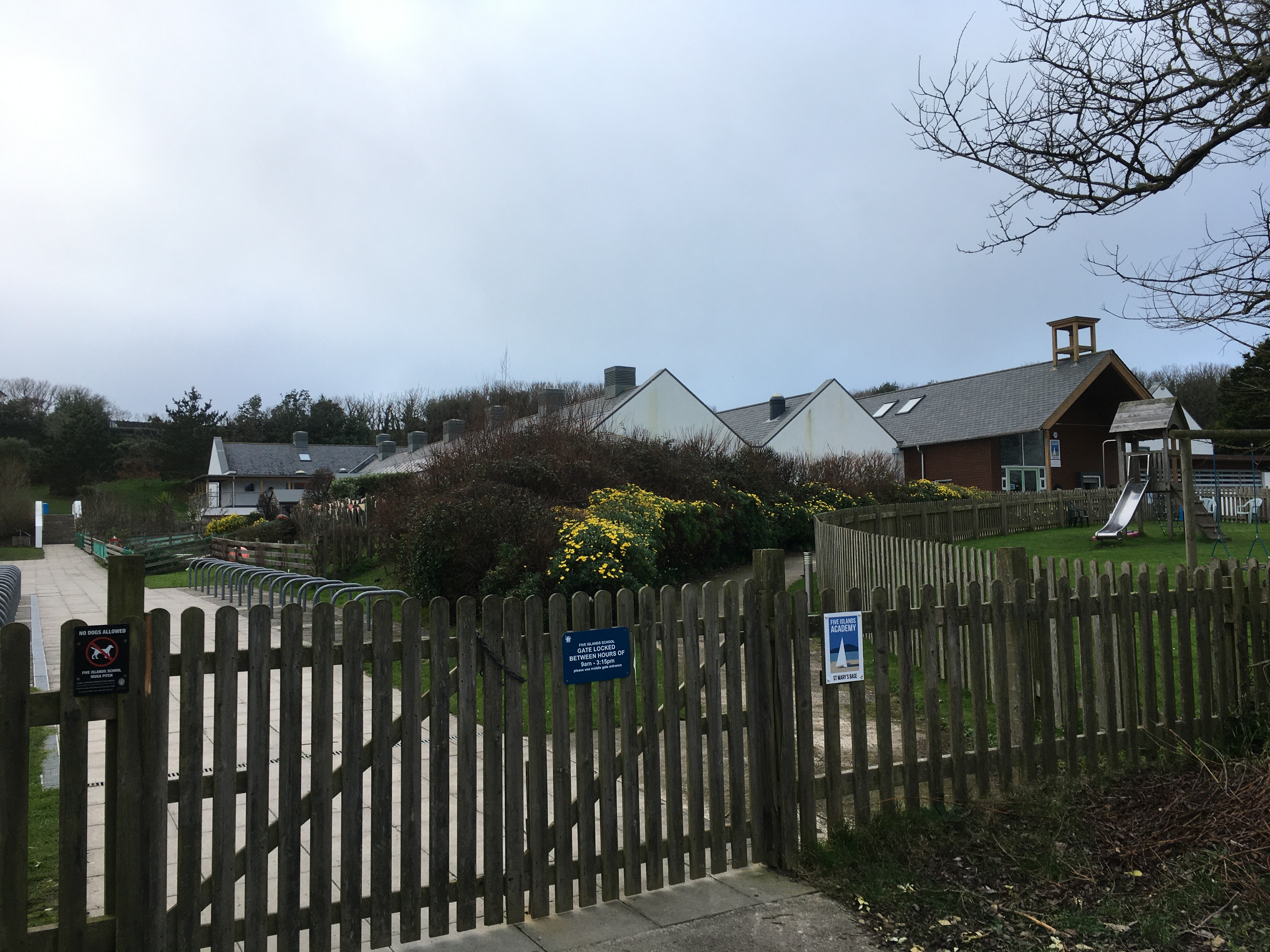
Five Islands Academy site at St Mary's

Five Islands Academy (previously Five Islands School) has a combined primary and secondary campus in St. Mary's. A boarding house, Mundesley Boarding House, serves secondary students from other islands. Students at the sixth-form college level reside and board elsewhere, in mainland Great Britain. Previously the Learning and Skills Council paid for costs of accommodation for sixth-formers.

St. Mary's Library is located at the Porthcressa seafront.

Carn Gwaval Wellbeing Centre has adult further education programmes.

== See also ==
- List of shipwrecks of the Isles of Scilly
- List of windmills in Cornwall#Isles of Scilly
