= St Mary's Boatmen's Association =

- The booking office on Hugh Town harbour
- Established: 1957
- Headquarters: St Mary's, Isles of Scilly
- Coordinates: 49.916393°N 6.317336°W
- Services: Passenger boat services
- Website: www.scillyboating.co.uk

The St Mary’s Boatmen's Association is a co-operative which provides passenger and freight boating services in the Isles of Scilly.

== History ==
The association was formed at the end of 1957 to unite formerly independent passenger boat operators on St Mary’s in the Isles of Scilly. It caters largely for visitors staying on St Mary’s with boat trips to other islands and Bishop Rock Lighthouse, and also wildlife and sightseeing trips. Each vessel can carry between 72 and 100 passengers. Residents and those staying on Tresco and Bryher use vessels provided by Tresco Boat Services.

Five of the vessels are listed with National Historic Ships UK.

== Vessels ==
- Guiding Star built in 1933 by Percy Mitchell, Mevagissey, Cornwall. She is registered as a National Historic Ship with registration number 324.
- Britannia built in 1944 by the Admiralty. She is registered as a National Historic Ship with registration number 321.
- Surprise built in 1945 by the Admiralty in Christchurch, Hampshire. She is registered as a National Historic Ship with registration number 329.
- Sea King built in 1947 by Mashfords of Plymouth. She is registered as a National Historic Ship with registration number 327. This boat was featured in series two of the TV programme An Island Parish.
- Golden Spray built in 1947 in Margate. She is registered as a National Historic Ship with registration number 323.
- Kingfisher built in 1995 by Kingfisher Boats, Falmouth
- Seahorse built in 1997
- Sapphire built in 2000 by Kingfisher Boats, Falmouth
- Meridian built in 2003 by Kingfisher Boats, Falmouth. A Kingfisher K50
- Osprey built in 2003 by Kingfisher Boats, Falmouth. A Kingfisher K50

== Gallery ==
Britannia

Golden Spray

Guiding Star

Kingfisher

Meridian

Osprey

Sapphire

Sea KIng

Seahorse

Surprise

== Former vessels ==
Lily of Laguna in 1990 at Tresco

Kingsley II in 2013 at St Mawes

The bow of Swordfish II now used as a beach shelter and bench in Old Town Bay, St Mary's

- Black Swan 1986 - 2003. Built in 1944 as a naval harbour service launch. She then went to Falmouth and worked in the harbour under the name Queen of Helford. Moved to Scilly in 1986. Bought by Cornwall Ferries for the Falmouth Park and Float scheme in 2003 to 2019. After this she was deployed for Truro River Cruises as Truro Belle.
- Buccaneer 1977 - 2003 (replaced by Osprey). Bought by Cornwall Ferries for the Falmouth Park and Float scheme from 2003 to 2019.
- Busy Bee
- Gloria I 1964 - 1965 (replaced by Britannia)
- Gloria II 1964 - 1965 (replaced by Britannia)
- Gondolier 1957 - 1968
- Kingsley (replaced by Kingsley II early 1970s). Kingsley registered as a National Historic Ship with registration number 3656.
- Kingsley II built in 1934. (replaced by Meridian 2003). Bought by Cornwall Ferries for the Falmouth Park and Float scheme from 2003 to 2019. Now operating as a ferry on the Fal River.
- Lily of Laguna built 1927. (Replaced in 2000 by Sapphire). Moved to the mainland in 2002 and then acquired for conversion into a private sailing yacht.
- Nemo 1957 - 1965 (replaced by Surprise)
- Sapphire until 1963
- Seahorse until ca. 1963
- Sheppey Queen 1959 - 1960. She is registered as a National Historic Ship with registration number 3656.
- Southern Queen 1962 - 1995 (replaced by the Kingfisher). One of the Dunkirk Little Ships now restored but no longer in the Isles of Scilly. She is registered as a National Historic Ship with registration number 328.
- Swordfish until 1962 (replaced by Swordfish II)
- Swordfish II 1962 - 1992. Built as a 45-foot launch that had been used as a liberty boat aboard HMS Woolwich. The bow section now forms a beach shelter with a bench in Old Town Bay, St Mary's.
