= Hugh Town =

Hugh Town: Cornish: Treworenys
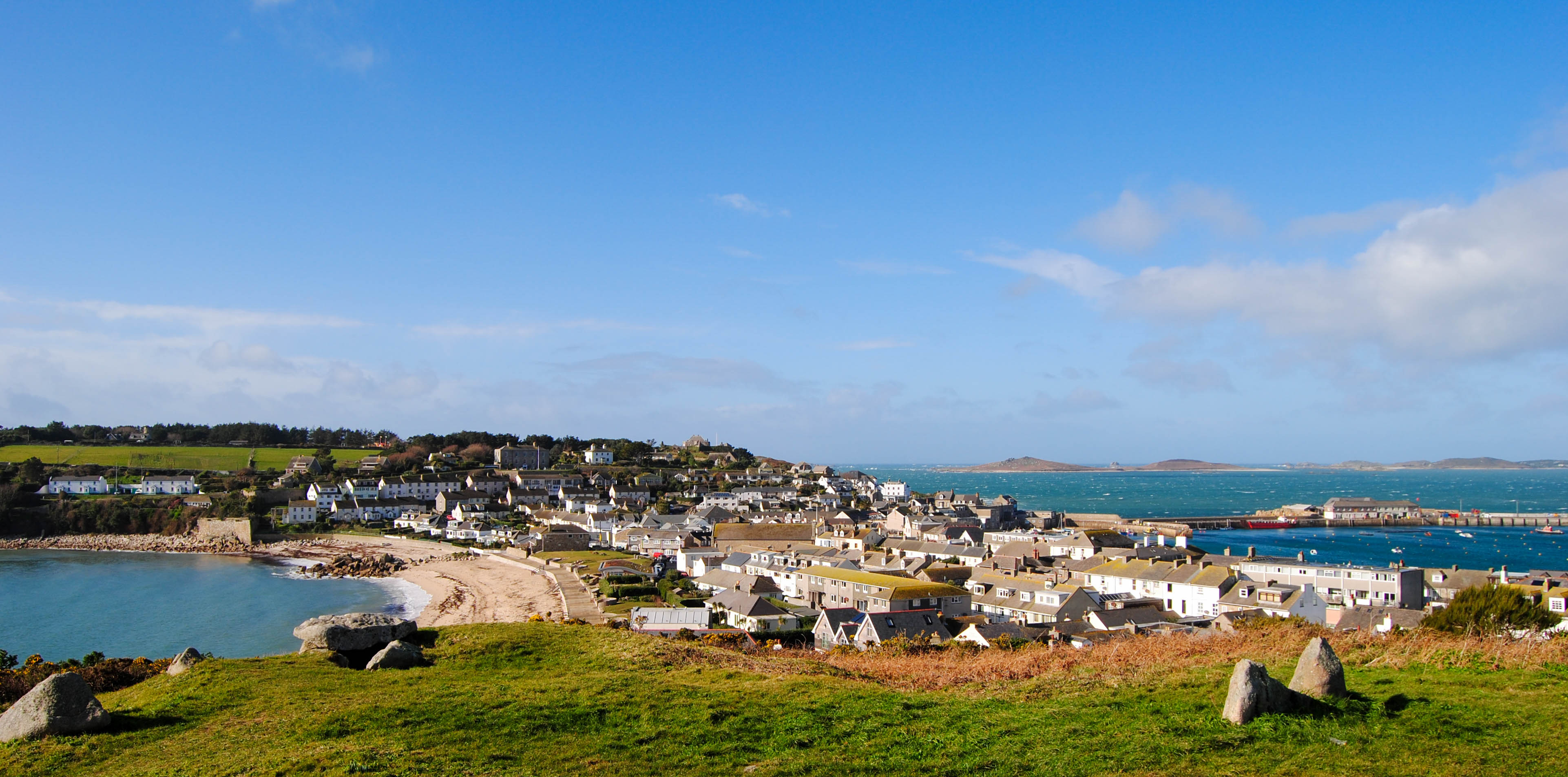
- View of Hugh Town (2015)

- Location within Isles of Scilly
- Population: 948
- OS grid reference: SV903105
- Civil parish: St Mary's
- Unitary authority: Isles of Scilly
- Ceremonial county: Cornwall
- Region: South West
- Country: England
- Sovereign state: United Kingdom
- Post town: Isles of Scilly
- Postcode district: TR21
- Dialling code: 01720
- Police: Devon and Cornwall
- Fire: Isles of Scilly
- Ambulance: South Western
- UK Parliament: St Ives

Hugh Town (Cornish: Treworenys or Tre Huw) is the largest settlement on the Isles of Scilly and its administrative centre. The town is in the west of the isle of St Mary's, the largest and most populous island in the archipelago; it is on a narrow isthmus which joins the peninsula known as the Garrison (historically the Hugh) with the rest of the island.

The population recorded by the 2011 census was 1,097 (up from 1,068 in 2001). Unlike the rest of the Isles of Scilly, the freehold title to land in the town is not held by the Duchy of Cornwall — in 1949 it was sold to the inhabitants. The harbour, however, continues to be owned and run by the Duchy.

Hugh Town becomes particularly busy during the May Day bank holiday weekend (the first weekend in May) when the World Pilot Gig Championships are held. The competing teams base themselves in the several bays of St Mary's Pool (the large natural bay to the north of Hugh Town) and the numerous races finish at the end of the harbour quay.

== History ==
The name Hugh is derived from an Old English word 'hoh' meaning a promontory or elevated ground. The Garrison was originally known as The Hugh or Hugh Hill. The same word is used in Plymouth Hoe and Hoe Point on Gugh. Cemeteries containing native British people were found in 1949 and 1960 on the Porthcress side of the town, when housing was built. The remains are dated from the 1st to 4th century. A Roman altar was found on The Garrison in the 19th century and is now in Tresco Abbey Gardens. The area has not been excavated so there may be an undiscovered shrine or temple. During medieval times Old Town was the main centre of population but from the 17th century onwards, due to its sheltered harbour, Hugh Town began to grow. Star Castle was built in 1593, the quay in 1601 and in the 18th century, as the military defences increased, The Hugh became known as The Garrison. In 1920 two football teams were founded: Woolpack Wanderers and Garrison Gunners.

== Amenities and landmarks ==
Hugh Street is the main shopping area on the islands and business is quite reliant on tourism. There are several pubs, restaurants and hotels, as well as a bank and a post office. In 2021 it was announced that the bank would close in 2022. A notable building is the Star Castle, which overlooks the town from The Garrison and is now a hotel. Similarly, Tregarthen's Hotel is a Hugh Town landmark. It was originally the home of Captain Frank Tregarthen who introduced the first sloop in 1849, 'Ariadne', that serviced the Hugh Town from Penzance. Being on an isthmus, there are two beaches, the northern one (Town Beach) being along the bay which forms the island's main harbour; the southern beach and bay is named Porthcressa.

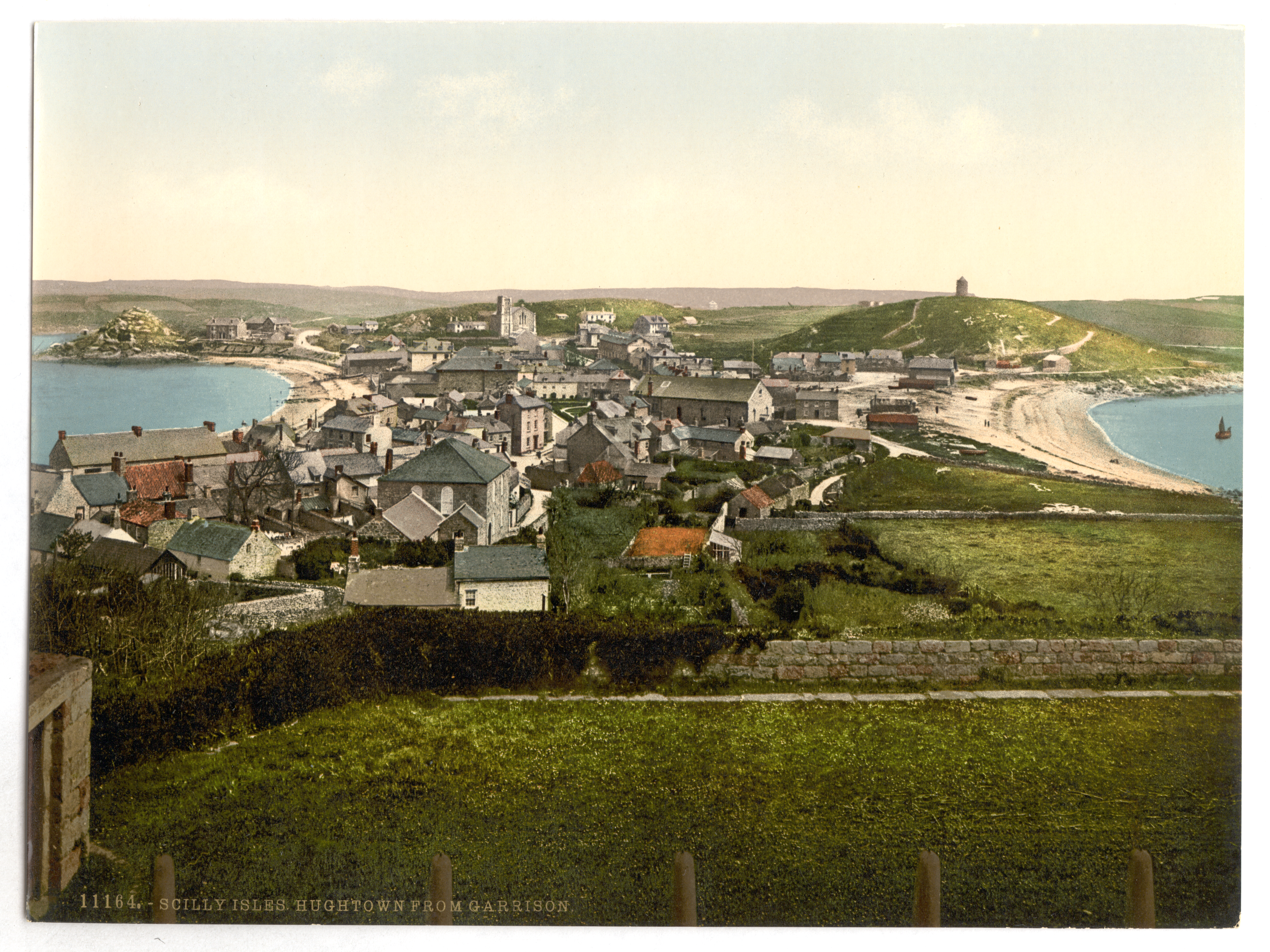
A Photocrom picture of Hugh Town, circa 1900. This was the view from The Garrison, with Buzza Hill prominent on the other end of the town.

The Council of the Isles of Scilly is based at the Isles of Scilly Town Hall, a grade II listed building located at The Parade, a small park situated at the centre of the isthmus (and originally a parade ground). The Duchy of Cornwall, which owns almost all the freehold land in the Isles of Scilly, as well as being the port authority, has its Isles of Scilly offices at Hugh House, located within the Garrison walls.

The Church of England's St Mary's Church, the islands' Roman Catholic Church and St Mary's Methodist Church are all located on or near Church Street. The Isles of Scilly Museum, previously located on Church Street, is now located at the Town Hall. The town has a public library and a police station. On the eastern outskirts of the town (heading towards Peninnis Head) are the NHS community hospital and local health centre, as well as other important public amenities such as the island's power station, the island's refuse depot and the town's fire station. The island's primary and secondary schools (both part of the Five Islands Academy) are situated to the southeast of the town, at Carn Gwaval, on the road to Old Town.

The island's airport is located approximately 1 mile (1.6 km) to the east of the centre of Hugh Town.

The Isles of Scilly Museum was housed in a purpose-built building which was declared unsafe in 2019, and is now partly accommodated in the Town Hall. There is a plan to convert the Town Hall building to form the Isles of Scilly Cultural Centre and Museum, to open in 2025/26.

== Climate ==
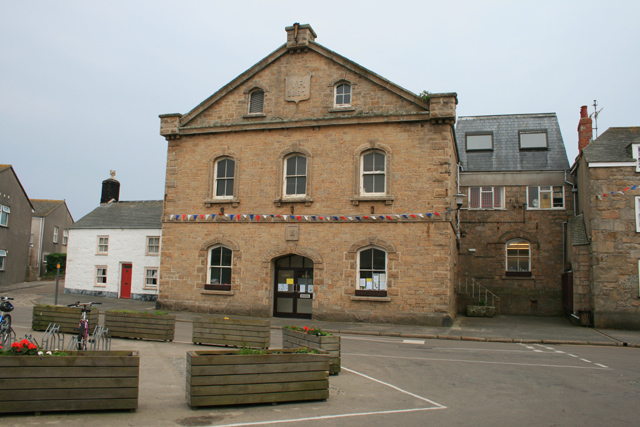
Isles of Scilly Town Hall

Hugh Town boasts one of the mildest climates in the UK and a relatively high amount of sunshine compared to other areas, although it is not the sunniest part of the British isles. As with most of the British Isles, Hugh Town experiences a maritime climate (Cfb) with wet, windy and very mild winters and comfortable or tepid summers with a slight drying trend, mainly due to influence from the Azores High. Temperatures rarely, if ever, dip below freezing - snowfall is exceptionally rare, with the most recent occurrence being during the 2018 British Isles cold wave.

Climate data for St Mary's Airport WMO ID: 03803; coordinates 49°54′52″N 6°17′45″W; elevation: 10 m (33 ft); 1991–2020 normals, extremes 1930-
Month	Jan	Feb	Mar	Apr	May	Jun	Jul	Aug	Sep	Oct	Nov	Dec	Year
Record high °C (°F)	14.4 (57.9)	13.5 (56.3)	16.1 (61.0)	20.3 (68.5)	22.2 (72.0)	27.4 (81.3)	27.8 (82.0)	27.8 (82.0)	24.4 (75.9)	21.3 (70.3)	18.3 (64.9)	14.7 (58.5)	27.8 (82.0)
Mean daily maximum °C (°F)	9.9 (49.8)	10.0 (50.0)	10.9 (51.6)	12.6 (54.7)	14.7 (58.5)	17.3 (63.1)	19.3 (66.7)	19.7 (67.5)	18.3 (64.9)	15.0 (59.0)	12.2 (54.0)	10.6 (51.1)	14.2 (57.6)
Daily mean °C (°F)	8.2 (46.8)	8.2 (46.8)	8.8 (47.8)	10.1 (50.2)	12.1 (53.8)	14.7 (58.5)	16.6 (61.9)	17.0 (62.6)	15.7 (60.3)	12.9 (55.2)	10.5 (50.9)	8.9 (48.0)	12.0 (53.6)
Mean daily minimum °C (°F)	6.4 (43.5)	6.3 (43.3)	6.7 (44.1)	7.5 (45.5)	9.5 (49.1)	12.0 (53.6)	13.8 (56.8)	14.3 (57.7)	13.1 (55.6)	10.8 (51.4)	8.7 (47.7)	7.1 (44.8)	9.7 (49.5)
Record low °C (°F)	−7.2 (19.0)	−5.0 (23.0)	−2.3 (27.9)	−1.8 (28.8)	2.4 (36.3)	6.1 (43.0)	7.2 (45.0)	7.2 (45.0)	6.6 (43.9)	3.9 (39.0)	0.7 (33.3)	−2.2 (28.0)	−7.2 (19.0)
Average precipitation mm (inches)	93.2 (3.67)	75.6 (2.98)	57.4 (2.26)	49.6 (1.95)	47.6 (1.87)	50.4 (1.98)	68.5 (2.70)	76.8 (3.02)	71.1 (2.80)	89.0 (3.50)	100.0 (3.94)	100.1 (3.94)	879.3 (34.62)
Average precipitation days (≥ 1.0 mm)	15.1	13.3	11.7	10.3	8.6	8.7	8.8	10.3	9.6	13.8	15.6	15.9	141.8
Average relative humidity (%)	83	81	84	83	86	86	85	85	85	85	83	84	84
Average dew point °C (°F)	6 (43)	5 (41)	6 (43)	7 (45)	9 (48)	12 (54)	14 (57)	14 (57)	13 (55)	11 (52)	8 (46)	7 (45)	9 (49)
Mean monthly sunshine hours	58.3	83.4	131.6	195.2	220.6	211.0	205.0	196.6	165.1	116.9	72.1	52.1	1,707.9
Source 1: Met Office
Source 2: Starlings Roost Weather Time and Date

== Harbour ==
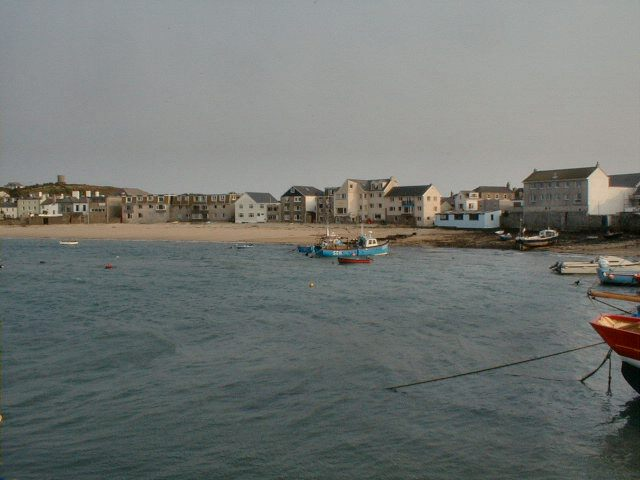
View of the town from the quay, with Town Beach running between the harbour and the rear of buildings

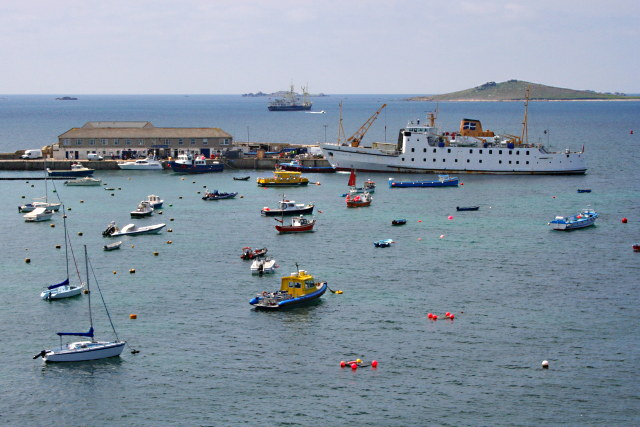
The Scillonian III berthed at the (former Rat Island) end of the quay

The principal harbour of the Isles of Scilly (known as St Mary's Harbour) is located on the northern edge of the town, naturally formed by the bay at Town Beach (itself part of a larger bay named St Mary's Pool) and improved by the construction of a quay on its western side, which acts also as a breakwater.

The quay is the terminal of the ferry to Penzance, currently the Scillonian III, and the cargo vessel Gry Maritha; both vessels have St Mary's as their port of registry. The Duchy of Cornwall is the owner and the harbour authority (the St Mary's Harbour and Pilotage Authority). It is also the base for the St Mary's Boatmen's Association which provides passenger services to other islands.

The original quay was built in 1593 and an extension (or offshoot) began in 1836 to Rat Island under a contract of £4,000 (equivalent to £395,024 in 2025) to William Martin of Penzance. Martin resigned in November 1837 and Augustus Smith organised the completion. The enlargement of the harbour produced an increase in harbour dues as larger and deeper-draughted boats were now able to dock for loading, unloading, repairs or victualling. In 1889, Smith's successor Thomas Smith-Dorrien-Smith extended the pier a further 250 feet eastwards, at his own expense, so that the West Cornwall Steam Ship Company ships could dock. Despite Parliamentary opposition, a Pier and Harbour Provisional Order Bill passed in June 1890 gave him revenue from the harbour dues.

The quay was extended by a further 23 metres (25 yards) in 2015, with new passenger and freight facilities being constructed too. The extension to the quay allows for vessels of a greater draft (up to 3.9 m or 12 ft 10 in). A small amount of land reclamation took place by Rat Island too, enlarging the space around the buildings there.

Improvements to the quay, including a boardwalk to improve pedestrian access to the quay, were announced in 2021 as part of the levelling up funding granted to the islands.

=== Lifeboat station ===
On the eastern end of Town Beach (on the rocky outcrop known as Carn Thomas) is the St Mary's Lifeboat Station, first operated in 1837 and run by the RNLI.
