= King Charles's Castle =

16th century castle in the Isles of Scilly

- Tresco in the Isles of Scilly
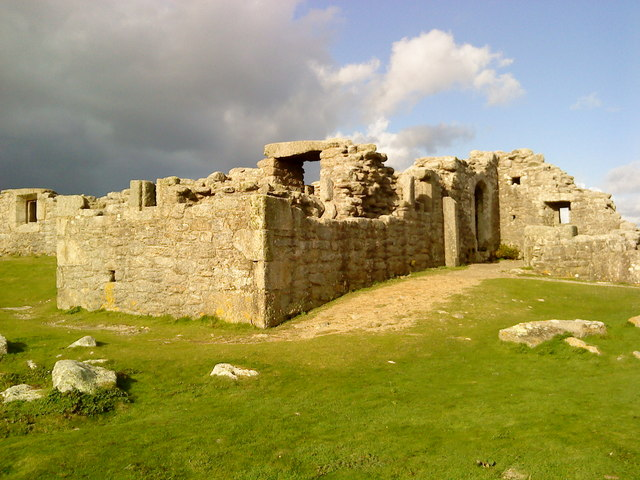
- Exterior of King Charles's Castle

Site information
- Type: Gun tower
- Owner: English Heritage
- Open to the public: Yes
- Condition: Ruined

Location
- Shown within the Isles of Scilly
- Location within Isles of Scilly
- Coordinates: 49.96344°N 6.34931°W
- Grid reference: grid reference SV897154

Site history
- Materials: Granite
- Events: 1651 invasion of the Scilly Isles

Scheduled monument
- Official name: King Charles' Castle mid-16th century artillery castle and Civil War earthen artillery defence on western Castle Down, Tresco
- Designated: 9 October 1981
- Reference no.: 1013667

Listed Building – Grade II*
- Official name: King Charles' Castle
- Designated: 14 December 1992
- Reference no.: 1328850

King Charles's Castle is a ruined artillery fort overlooking New Grimsby harbour on the island of Tresco in the Isles of Scilly. Built between 1548 and 1551 to protect the islands from French attack, it would have held a battery of guns and an accompanying garrison, designed to prevent enemy vessels from entering the harbour. The castle is polygonal in design, constructed from granite stone, with the gun battery at the front, and a dining room, kitchen and living accommodation at the rear. An additional defensive earthwork was constructed around it during the 17th century. The design of the castle is unusual for the period, and is only seen elsewhere in blockhouses along the River Thames.

The castle's design was unsatisfactory, as its guns could not be angled so to fire down into the harbour, and its defences were considered vulnerable to attack. To mitigate this, an additional blockhouse was probably constructed below, closer to the water, but eventually a new fortification, the Star Castle, was built instead on the neighbouring island of St Mary's, which became the main fort in the Scilly Isles. In the aftermath of the English Civil War, the Scilly Isles were held by the Royalist sympathisers of King Charles I, who gave the castle its current name. The islands were then attacked by a Parliamentary force led by Sir Robert Blake in 1651, who landed on Tresco but bypassed the fort as he took the island. Its Royalist defenders blew up parts of the castle as they left, and some of its stone appears to have been used to build the newer Cromwell's Castle by the harbour.

Although King Charles's Castle was being used to house soldiers in 1660, by the 18th century it was described as ruinous. After 1922, the castle passed into the guardianship of the Ministry of Works, and archaeological excavations were carried out in 1954. In the 21st century the site is controlled by English Heritage and is open to visitors. It is protected under UK law as a scheduled monument and a Grade II* listed building.

== History ==
=== 16th century ===
==== Construction ====
King Charles's Castle was built between 1548 and 1551 to protect the Scilly Isles against French attack. Tensions with France had grown during the reign of Henry VIII and spilled over into war in 1538. Henry initially responded by fortifying the coasts of England, constructing new artillery forts designed to defend against the longer-range cannons that were becoming common in the 16th century. Henry's son, the nine-year-old Edward VI, inherited the throne in 1547, facing renewed war with France. Edward Seymour was made the Lord Protector to the King, and he appointed his brother, Thomas, as England's Lord High Admiral. Thomas inspected the Scilly Isles personally and concluded that they were vulnerable to a French invasion.

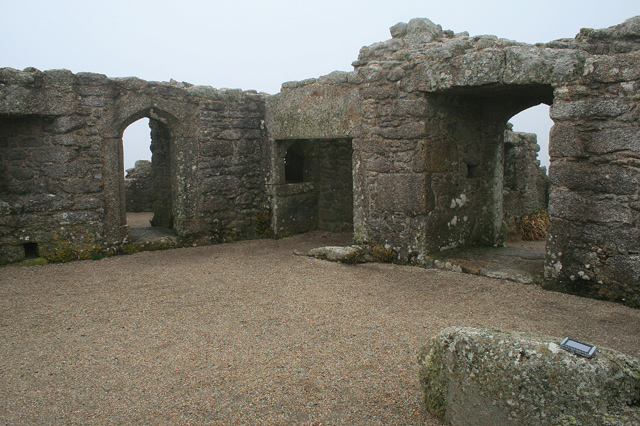
The interior of the hall

As a result of the inspection, Sir Francis Flemming, the Lieutenant-General of the Ordnance, was tasked in February 1558 with improving the defences on the islands. Flemming was supported in this effort with a shipment of lead to aid in construction, and money raised from the dissolution of the monasteries in England. The building work initially focused on the island of Tresco and was carried out under the direction of John Killigrew, the captain of Pendennis Castle in Falmouth. Tresco was in need of modern defences, but Killigrew also wanted to use the work programme to increase his political influence on the island.

The castle was built as part of this programme of work. It was positioned on the high ground of Castle Down to protect New Grimsby harbour, overlooking the narrow, northern entrance to the harbour. It would have held a battery of guns and an accompanying garrison, designed to prevent enemy vessels from entering the harbour.

Edward Seymour fell from power in 1549, and after his removal a new survey was carried out by Captain William Tyrell, in part to confirm that the new fortifications were suitably located across the islands. Building work across the Scilly Isles continued, expanding to include the neighbouring island of St Mary's. At least 540 oak trees from South Wales were dispatched to the islands in early 1550, as the islands lacked suitable sources of timber of their own. Orders were given in 1551 to send bows, arrows and the ingredients required to make gunpowder to the islands, where construction teams were kept at work throughout 1552.

The Old Blockhouse appears to have been completed, but the Crown's resources had become badly stretched and it was decided at the end of 1552 to curtail further expenditure on the Scilly Isles. Between 1548 and 1552, a total of £3,123 had been spent on improving the fortifications on the islands; a 1579 survey suggested that, with the cost of the garrisons, the project had come to a total of £6,000. (Note: It is difficult to accurately compare 16th-century and modern prices or incomes. £3,123 could equate to between £809,000 and £9,700,000 in 2012 terms, depending on the measure used. For comparison, the smaller defences along the south coast of England each cost Henry VIII between £500 and £1,000 to build, and the larger forts as much as £10,000.) Edward's successor, Queen Mary I, intended to establish a garrison of 150 soldiers on the islands, but it is uncertain if these numbers were ever achieved. By 1558, Killigrew held the title of the "captain in the Castell of Tresco", referring to King Charles's Castle.

==== Weaknesses ====
It soon became evident that King Charles's Castle had been built in a poor location. It was 40 metres (130 ft) above sea level and its guns could only fire at enemy ships in the harbour by being angled downwards. Artillery pieces in the 16th century could not fire in this position as the cannonballs would fall out of their muzzles, making the castle much less effective in defending Tresco. By 1554, a small blockhouse had been built beneath the castle on the future site of Cromwell's Castle, overlooking the harbour just above the sea level to compensate for this weakness.

The concerns over the castle were significant. Francis Godolphin, who at the time was renting Tresco from the Crown, commented at the end of the century that the castle could not defend the island as "it neither discovereth the whole harbour so through the iminent height thereof can make no good shot so steep downwards", and also complained about its fortification, "which is worst, is of so weak form as it cannot be defended". Partially in response to these problems, the new Star Castle was constructed on St Mary's island between 1593 and 1594; a more modern, well-positioned design, Star Castle rapidly became the key defensive site in the Scilly Isles.

=== 17th century ===
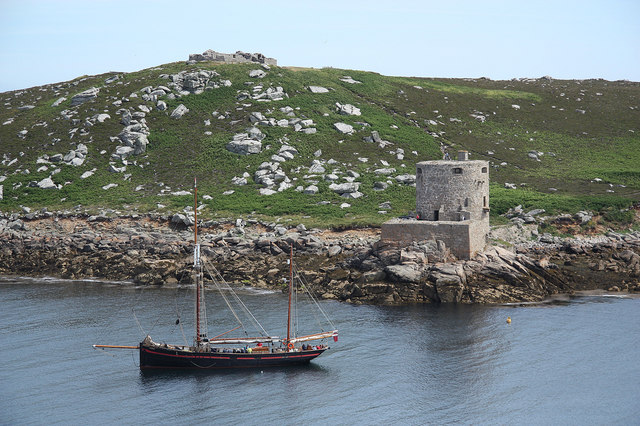
The castle (top), overlooking New Grimsby harbour and Cromwell's Castle (bottom)

The Scilly Isles supported Charles I during the English Civil War, and after a short period in Parliamentary control rebelled in favour of Charles in 1648. The Royalists on Tresco appeared to have believed that King Charles's Castle was a critical defensive point on the island and probably built new earthwork defences around the castle to defend it against an attack from the land. It is possible, however, that these defences instead date from around 1627, and were built by the King's engineer, Bernard Johnson. During this period the castle was given its current name.

Tresco formed a base for Royalist privateers, and Parliament became concerned that the Dutch, then hostile to England, might counter the piracy by occupying the islands, gaining a foothold they could then use against England. In 1651 Parliament sent Sir Robert Blake in charge of a naval task force to retake the islands.

Blake arrived at St Helen's Pool in April 1651, and set about invading the island of Tresco. Taking the harbour of Old Grimsby in an amphibious assault on 18 April, he then simply bypassed King Charles' Castle and marched south, using Tresco as a basis for then taking the neighbouring island of St Mary's.

The Royalist commander of the castle, William Edgecumbe, retreated from the castle on 19 April and the defenders blew up part of the site as they left, leaving the remains to the Parliamentary commander Colonel George Fleetwood. Some of the castle's stonework appears to have been reused in the construction of the new Cromwell's Castle by the Parliamentarians, just beneath King Charles's Castle, the new fortification being sited in a much better position to defend the harbour.

In 1660, Charles II was restored to the throne and Edward Sherburne was sent to the Scilly Isles to inspect the defences. He recommended that repairs be carried out to King Charles's Castle, which was then being used to house soldiers.

=== 18th–21st centuries ===
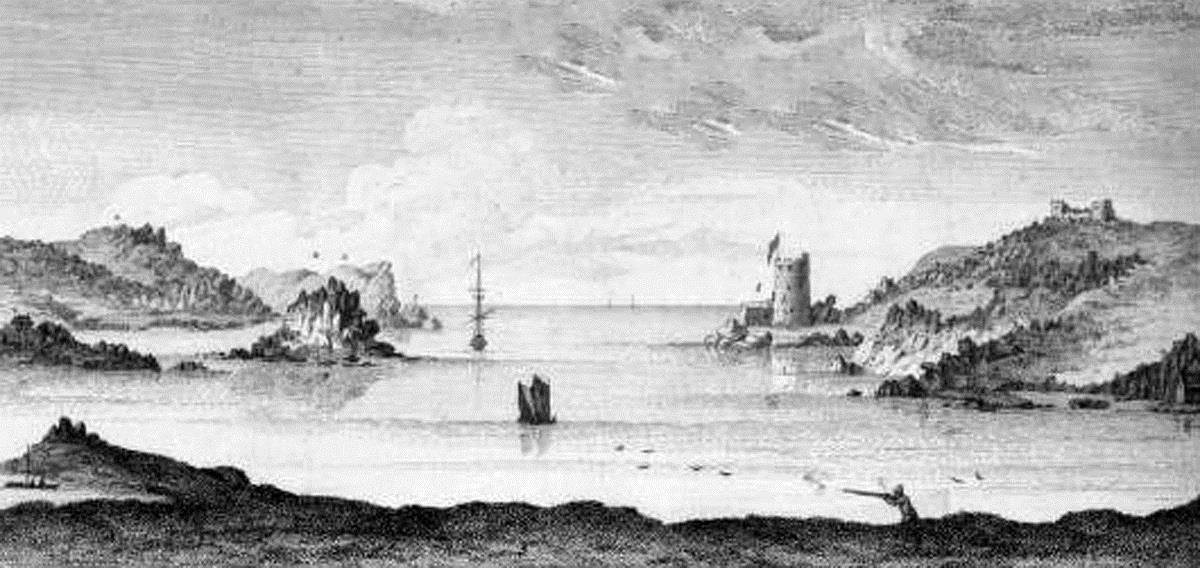
New Grimsby harbour in 1756, showing King Charles's Castle (right), overlooking Cromwell's Castle (centre)

The Crown, in the form of the Duchy of Cornwall, leased the islands in 1687 to the Godolphin family, followed by Augustus Smith in 1834. The antiquary William Borlase was critical of the castle—by then in ruins—during his 1752 visit, describing it as a "work of labour and expense, rather than of skill", and attributing its abandonment to its poor military utility. The writer John Troutbeck, commenting at the end of the century, took a similar perspective, praising the thickness of the walls, but noting that it was ill-positioned to fire into the harbour, unlike its replacement below.

In 1922, the lease passed to Arthur Dorrien-Smith, who agreed to pass several properties on Tresco, including the castle, into the guardianship of the Ministry of Works. The castle was partially excavated in 1954, uncovering coins, pottery and a buckle. Parts of the first floor of the battery were reconstructed from the fallen stonework uncovered during the dig.

In the 21st century, the blockhouse is controlled by English Heritage, the successor to the Ministry, and open to tourists. It is protected as a scheduled monument and a Grade II* listed building under UK law.

== Architecture ==
=== Buildings ===
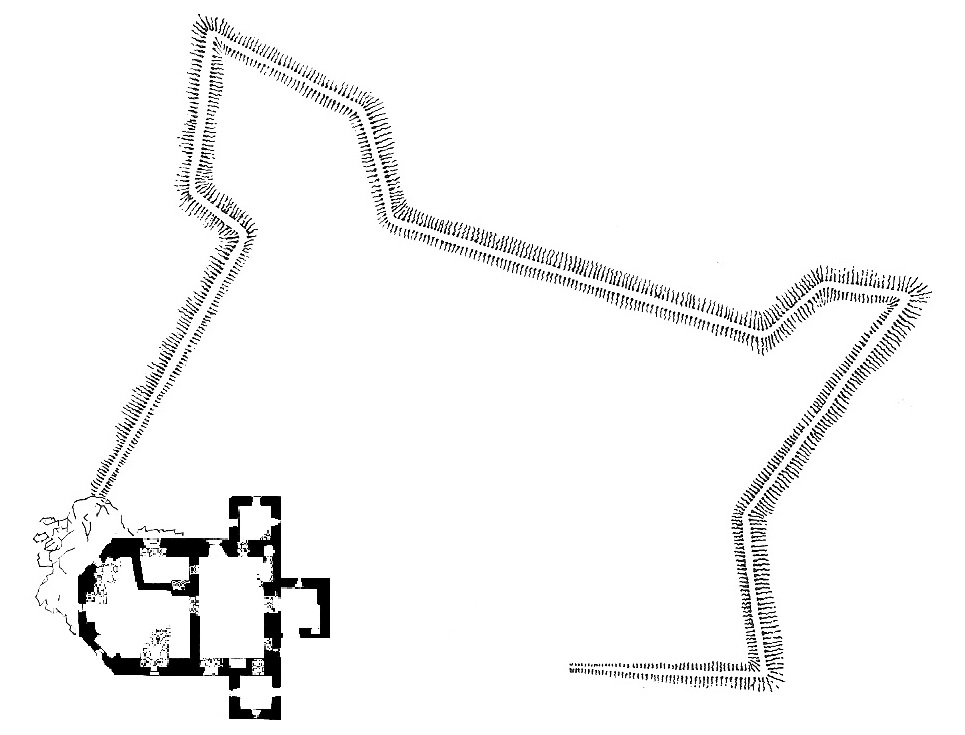
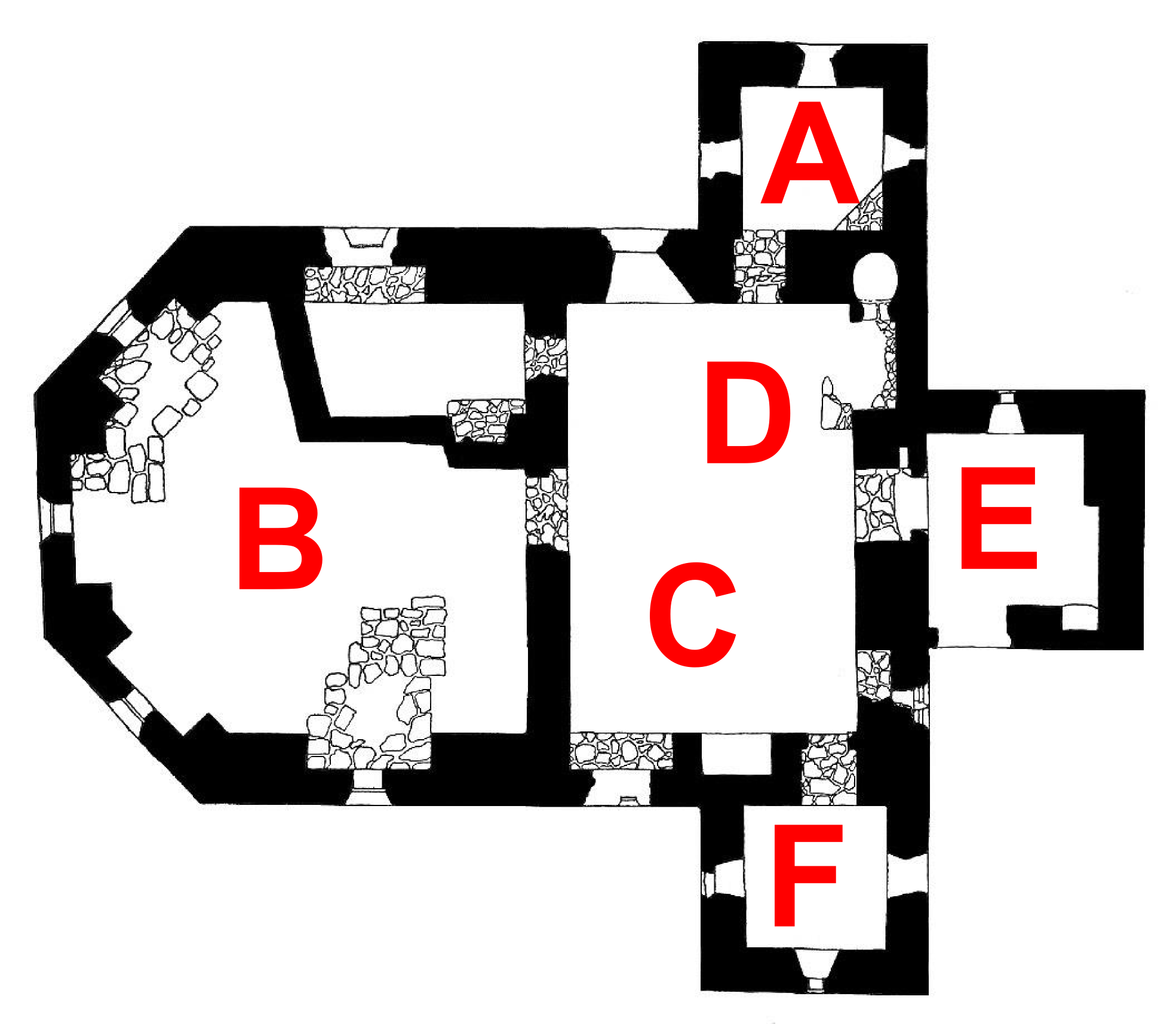
The castle and its earthworks (left); detailed plan (right): A - bedroom; B - gun battery; C - dining room; D - kitchen; E - guardroom; F - bedroom

King Charles's Castle is a polygonal stone building, composed of a gun battery on one side and living quarters on the other. On the west side, overlooking the sea, is a large room which originally contained the battery, with embrasures for five guns. At some point after its initial construction, the north-east gun embrasure was blocked by the construction of an internal chamber within the gun battery, 4.5 metres (15 ft) by 2.3 metres (7 ft 7 in), with the embrasure being opened up to form a window.

Behind the battery is a large room, 8.8 metres (29 ft) by 6 metres (20 ft), forming a hall and kitchen, originally for the use of the garrison and containing a fireplace and oven. The room has two bedrooms leading off it, each 2.9 metres (9 ft 6 in) square. The north bedroom may have been heated by a small brazier. A guardroom, 3.5 metres (11 ft) square, forms the entrance to the building, leading into the hall.

The castle is made from dressed and rubble granite, incorporating an underling rocky outcrop into the design in the north-west and south-west corners. In places the walls survive up to 3.4 metres (11 ft) high and 1.65 metres (5 ft 5 in) thick, but are on average only 1.5 metres (4 ft 11 in) tall and 0.8 metres (2 ft 7 in) thick. Opinions vary as to how tall the castle was when first built; it may have been two storeys high throughout, or may only have been that height in the gun battery, with the living accommodation being a single storey construction. (Note: English Heritage argues that the whole site was two storeys tall; the Cornwall and Scilly Historical Environmental Record favours a mixture of two and single storey construction; the historians Mark Bowden and Allan Marshall Brodie suggest that it is impossible to tell.) The upper storey of the gun battery would have held additional guns.

Architecturally, the castle is unusual for this period. Its design appears somewhat backward, particularly in comparison to the nearby fortification of Harry's Walls, built at the same time as the castle, but which adopted a more contemporary design that employed bastions. Its closest equivalents are the blockhouses built by Henry VIII on the River Thames.

=== Earthworks ===
The castle is surrounded by a rectangular earthwork, probably built in 1627, and similar to that at Sandsfoot and Pendennis Castles. It stretches away north-east from the castle, with an earth and rubble bank up to 2 metres (6 ft 7 in) high and 8 metres (26 ft) wide, with a bastion and demi-bastion at its corners and a ditch, up to 0.4 metres (1 ft 4 in) deep and 3 metres (9.8 ft) wide along the north and east sides.

Another line of earthworks survives around 40 metres (130 ft) south-east of these earthworks; its bank is 0.3 metres (1 ft 0 in) high, with a ditch up to 0.2 metres (7.9 in) deep. It lies just behind the crest of the hill, possibly for concealment, and is defended with bastions and orillons although it appears not to have been finished. It probably dates from the mid-16th century, possibly having been built at around the same time as the castle.

== See also ==
- Listed buildings in Tresco, Isles of Scilly

== Bibliography ==
- Ashbee, Paul (1986). "Ancient Scilly: Retrospect, Aspect and Prospect". Cornish Archaeology. 25: 186–219.
- Borlase, William (1756). Observations on the Ancient and Present State of the Islands of Scilly, and their Importance to the Trade of Great Britain. Oxford, UK: W. Jackson. OCLC 64415301.
- Brodie, Allan (2010). "The Tudor Defences of Scilly". English Heritage Historical Review. 5: 24–43. doi:10.1179/175201611X13079771582385.
- Brodie, Allan (2011). "The Garrison, St Mary's, Isles of Scilly: The Defences of the Garrison 1500–1945, Survey Report". Research Department Report Series. London, UK: English Heritage. ISSN 1749-8775.
- Bowden, Mark (2011). "Military Defences 1540–1951: Earthwork Sites and Minor Features". Research Department Report Series. London, UK: English Heritage. ISSN 1749-8775.
- Bowden, Mark; Brodie, Allan (2011a). "Defending Scilly". Research News. 16: 8–11.
- Bowden, Mark; Brodie, Allan (2011b). Defending Scilly. London, UK: English Heritage. ISBN 9781848020436.
- O'Neil, B. H. St John (1961). Ancient Monuments of the Isles of Scilly (2nd ed.). London, UK: Her Majesty's Stationery Office. OCLC 58256.
- Troutbeck, John (1796). A Survey of the Ancient and Present State of the Scilly Islands. nl: Sherborne, Goadby and Lerpiniere. OCLC 22406050.
