= Cromwell's Castle =

Castle in Tresco, Isles of Scilly, Cornwall, UK

- Tresco in the Isles of Scilly
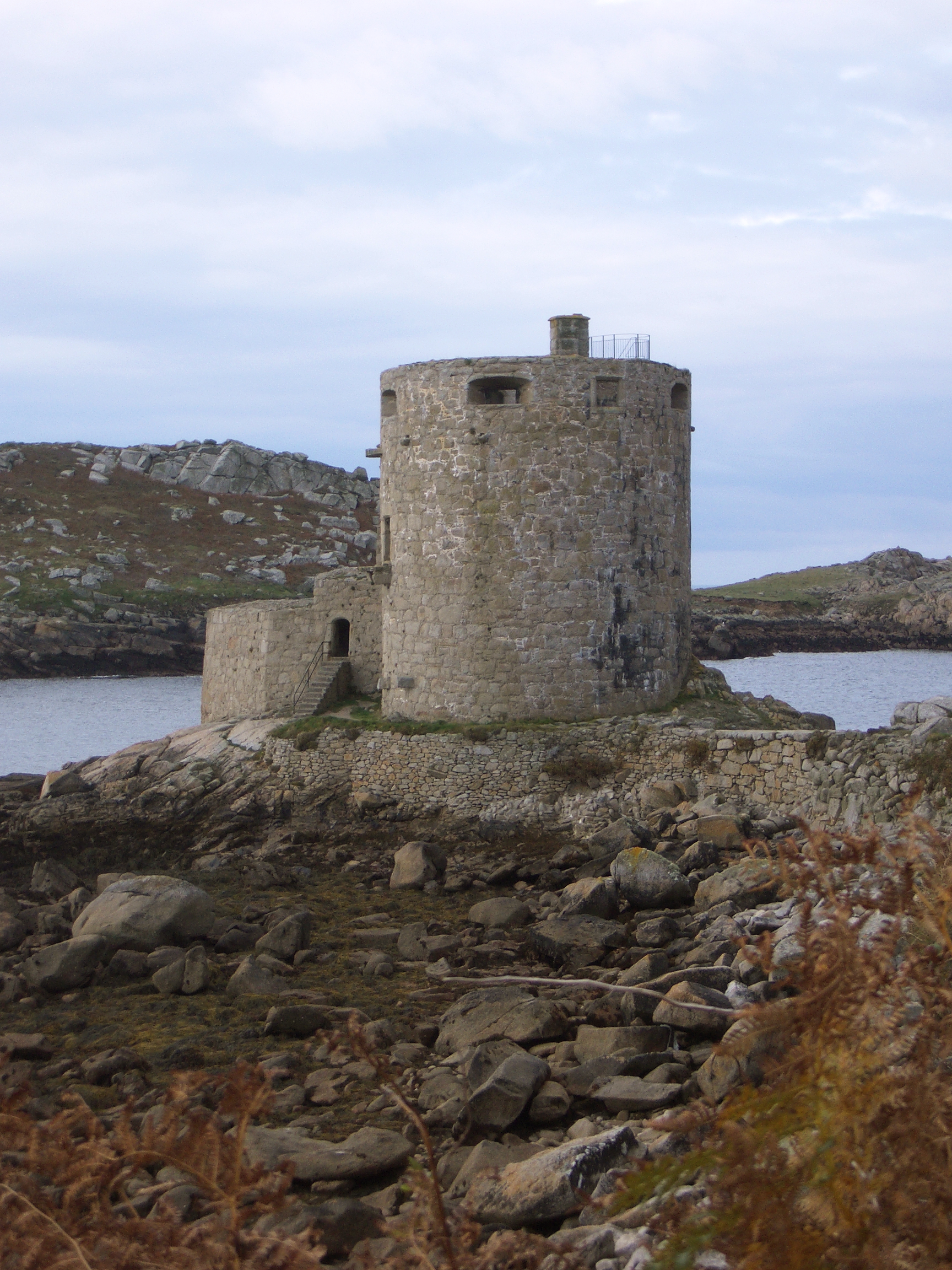
- The castle, seen from the land

Site information
- Type: Artillery tower
- Controlled by: English Heritage

Location
- Shown in the Isles of Scilly
- Location within Isles of Scilly
- Coordinates: 49.9616°N 6.3505°W
- Grid reference: grid reference SV881159
- Height: 15.1 metres (50 ft)

Site history
- Materials: Stone rubble

Scheduled monument
- Official name: Cromwell's Castle mid-17th century blockhouse and 18th century gun platform on the western coast of Castle Down, Tresco
- Designated: 9 October 1981
- Reference no.: 1013275

Listed Building – Grade II*
- Official name: Cromwells Castle
- Designated: 14 December 1992
- Reference no.: 1141198

Cromwell's Castle is an artillery fort overlooking New Grimsby harbour on the island of Tresco in the Isles of Scilly. It comprises a tall, circular gun tower and an adjacent gun platform, and was designed to prevent enemy naval vessels from entering the harbour. The castle was built in two phases; Sir Robert Blake constructed the tower between 1651 and 1652 in the aftermath of the Parliamentary invasion of the islands at the end of the English Civil War, and Master Gunner Abraham Tovey added the gun platform during the War of Jenkins' Ear around 1739. The tower fell into disuse soon afterwards, and in the 21st century is managed by English Heritage and open to visitors.

== History ==
=== 17th century ===
Cromwell's Castle is an artillery tower, built by Sir Robert Blake following the Parliamentary invasion of the Isles of Scilly in 1651. During the English Civil War between 1642 and 1646, the inhabitants of the Isles had been Royalist supporters of King Charles I, and rebelled against Parliament in favour of Charles in 1648. Tresco became a base for Royalist privateers and Parliament became concerned that the Dutch, then hostile to England, might exploit the situation, or that Royalist Irish forces might use the islands for an attack on England. In 1651 Parliament sent Robert Blake and a naval force to retake the island, which had been fortified by the Royalists.

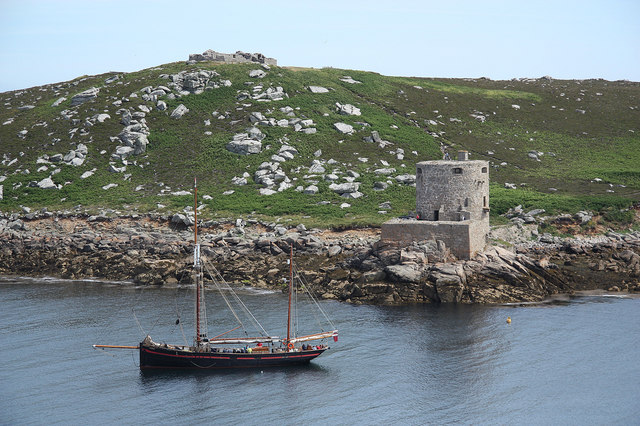
The castle seen from the sea, overlooked by the ruined King Charles's Castle

Having established control of the islands, between 1651 and 1652 Blake constructed Cromwell's Castle on Tresco, named after Oliver Cromwell, the Parliamentary leader. It was intended to protect the deep water entrance to New Grimsby harbour on the west side of the island, a route which could also allow enemy vessels access through to the other Scilly Isles. The Parliamentarian forces were particularly concerned about any potential Dutch attack.

There were two existing fortifications in this location. The main existing fort, King Charles's Castle, had been built in the 1550s but was poorly sited and had been blown up by its defenders when Blake's forces took the island. There was also a small blockhouse beneath it, dating from the 16th century, and the new castle was built on top of this preexisting site.

The castle initially comprised a three-storey circular tower, 13.45 metres (44.1 ft) across and 15.1 metres (50 ft) high, with walls almost 13 feet (4.0 m) thick, made from massive pieces of rubble; a later survey described the tower as "a Huge Mass of Masonry". Some of the stone used came from the ruins of King Charles's Castle. Six gun-ports with broad external splays on the roof allowed the battery a good angle of fire across the channel between the islands of Bryher and Tresco. There may have been an adjacent gun platform just beneath the main structure. The design was old-fashioned, resembling the circular keeps built by Henry VIII in the mid-16th century.

=== 17th–20th centuries ===
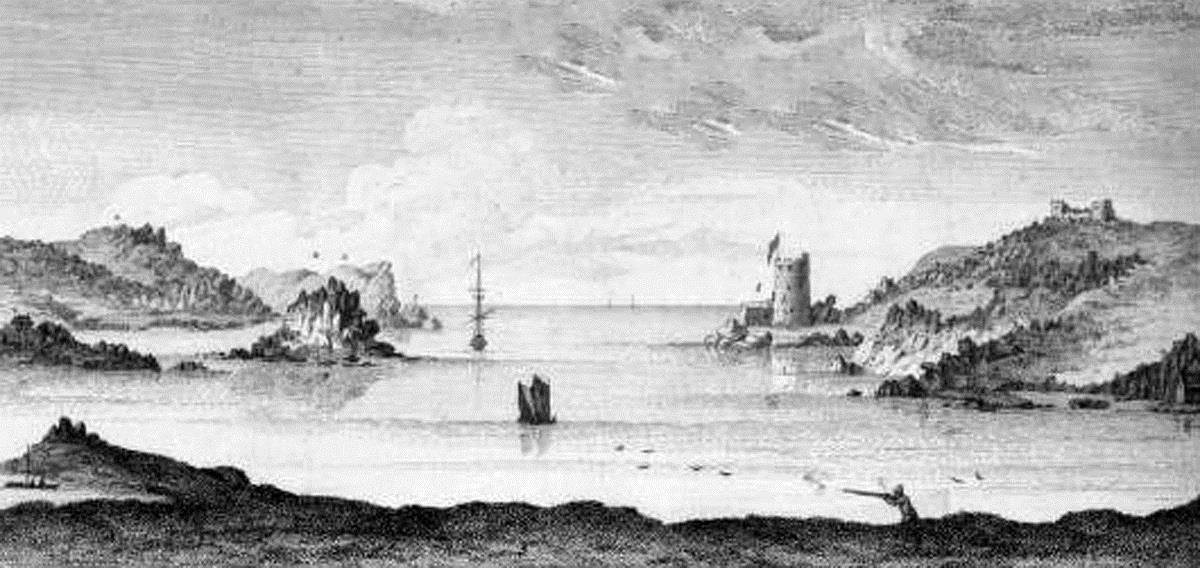
New Grimsby harbour in 1756, showing the castle (centre), overlooked by King Charles's Castle (right)

After the restoration of Charles II to the throne in 1660, a survey of the castle was carried out, which recommended repairs to the site. A survey carried out at the end of the 1730s suggested that the castle had ten artillery positions, but that there were not enough guns on the island to arm both the castle and the other defences, and that some of the guns that were available were unusable.

In 1739, the War of Jenkins' Ear broke out between Britain and Spain, and the decision was taken to improve the defences at Cromwell Castle. Abraham Tovey, the Master Gunner at the nearby fortification known as the Garrison, constructed a large gun-platform for a battery of six guns on the south-west side of the tower, possibly on top of any pre-existing 16th-century platform. A parapet protected the guns, a new entrance was cut into the main tower and other adjustments made.

The antiquary William Borlase visited the castle in 1752, noting that the gun platform was armed with 9-pounder (4 kg) cannons and the tower roof with 4-pounder (1.8 kg) guns. The site was now unmanned, however, and had fallen into decay since the construction work by Tovey. The writer John Troutbeck, commenting at the end of the century, remarked on the tower having a "special bomb proof" roof, topped with 6-foot (1.8 m) high parapets. He noted, that although there while still some old iron artillery guns present, the site was still ungarrisoned and in a state of disrepair.

The Crown, in the form of the Duchy of Cornwall, had leased the Scilly Isles to the Godolphin family in 1687, followed by Augustus Smith in 1834. In 1922, the lease passed to Smith's grand-nephew Arthur Dorrien-Smith, who agreed to pass several properties on Tresco, including the castle, into the guardianship of the Ministry of Works.

=== 21st century ===
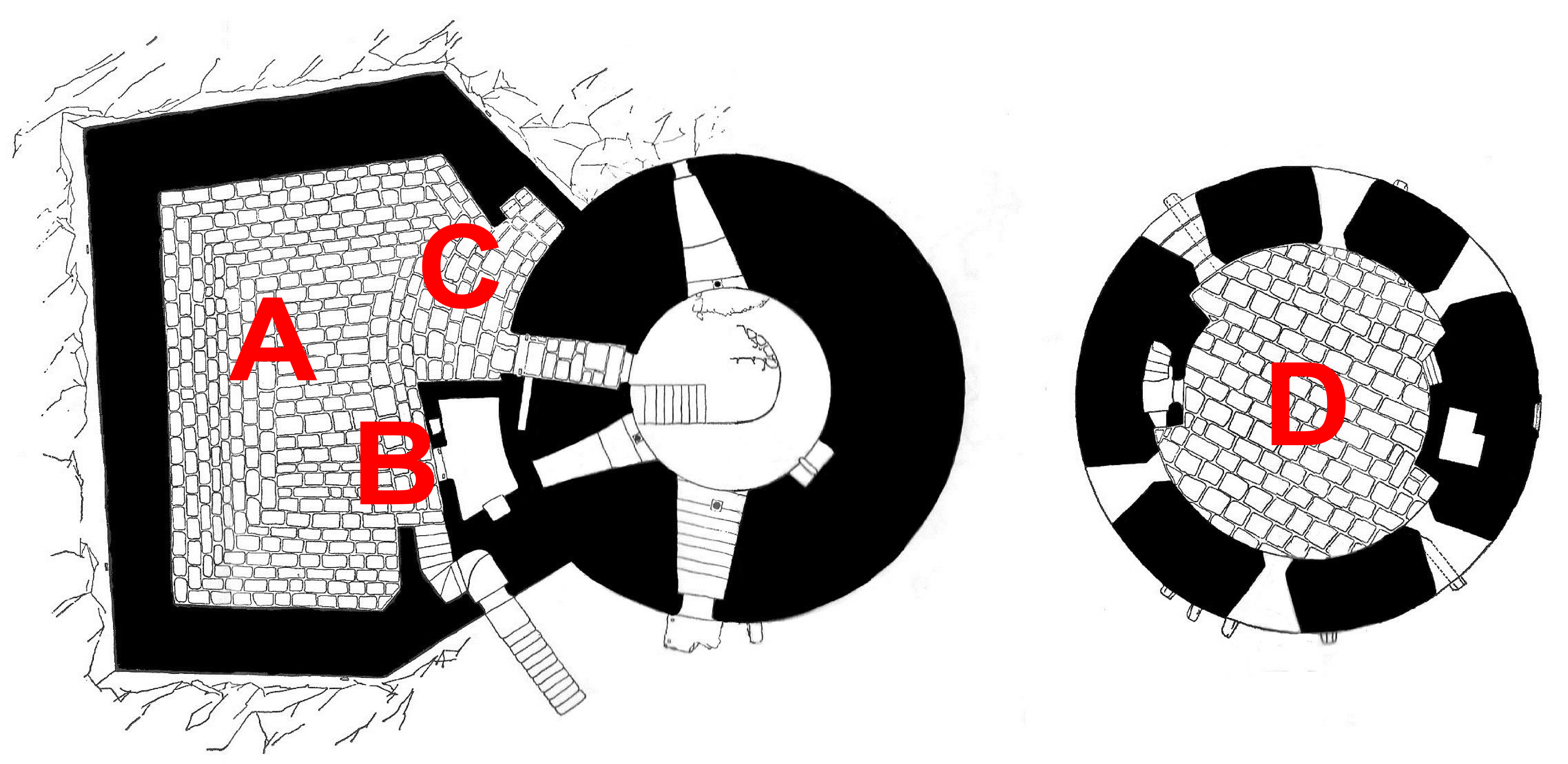
Plan of the castle, ground floor (left), first floor (right): A – 18th century gun platform; B – guard house; C – latrines; D – 17th-century tower

In the 21st century, the castle is controlled by English Heritage, as the successor to the Ministry of Works, and open to visitors. The interior wooden floors have been lost, but the spiral staircase and the stone, vaulted roof remain intact and accessible. English Heritage have commented that the castle is "one of only a few stone fortifications that survive from the Interregnum", and it is protected by UK law as a Grade II* listed building.

== See also ==
- Listed buildings in Tresco, Isles of Scilly
- Castles in Great Britain and Ireland
- List of castles in England

== Bibliography ==
- Borlase, William (1756). Observations on the Ancient and Present State of the Islands of Scilly, and Their Importance to the Trade of Great Britain. Oxford, UK: W. Jackson. OCLC 64415301.
- Brodie, Allan (2010). "The Tudor Defences of Scilly". English Heritage Historical Review. 5: 24–43. doi:10.1179/175201611X13079771582385.
- Brodie, Allan (2011). "The Garrison, St Mary's, Isles of Scilly: The Defences of the Garrison 1500–1945, Survey Report". Research Department Report Series. London, UK: English Heritage. ISSN 1749-8775.
- Bowden, Mark; Brodie, Allan (2011a). "Defending Scilly". Research News. 16: 8–11.
- Bowden, Mark; Brodie, Allan (2011b). Defending Scilly. London, UK: English Heritage. ISBN 9781848020436.
- O'Neil, B. H. St John (1961). Ancient Monuments of the Isles of Scilly (2nd ed.). London, UK: Her Majesty's Stationery Office. OCLC 58256.
- Saunders, Andrew (1989). Fortress Britain: Artillery Fortifications in the British Isles and Ireland. Liphook, UK: Beaufort. ISBN 1855120003.
- Troutbeck, John (1796). A Survey of the Ancient and Present State of the Scilly Islands. nl: Sherborne, Goadby and Lerpiniere. OCLC 22406050.
