= Old Blockhouse =

Scheduled monument in Scilly, UK

- Tresco in the Isles of Scilly
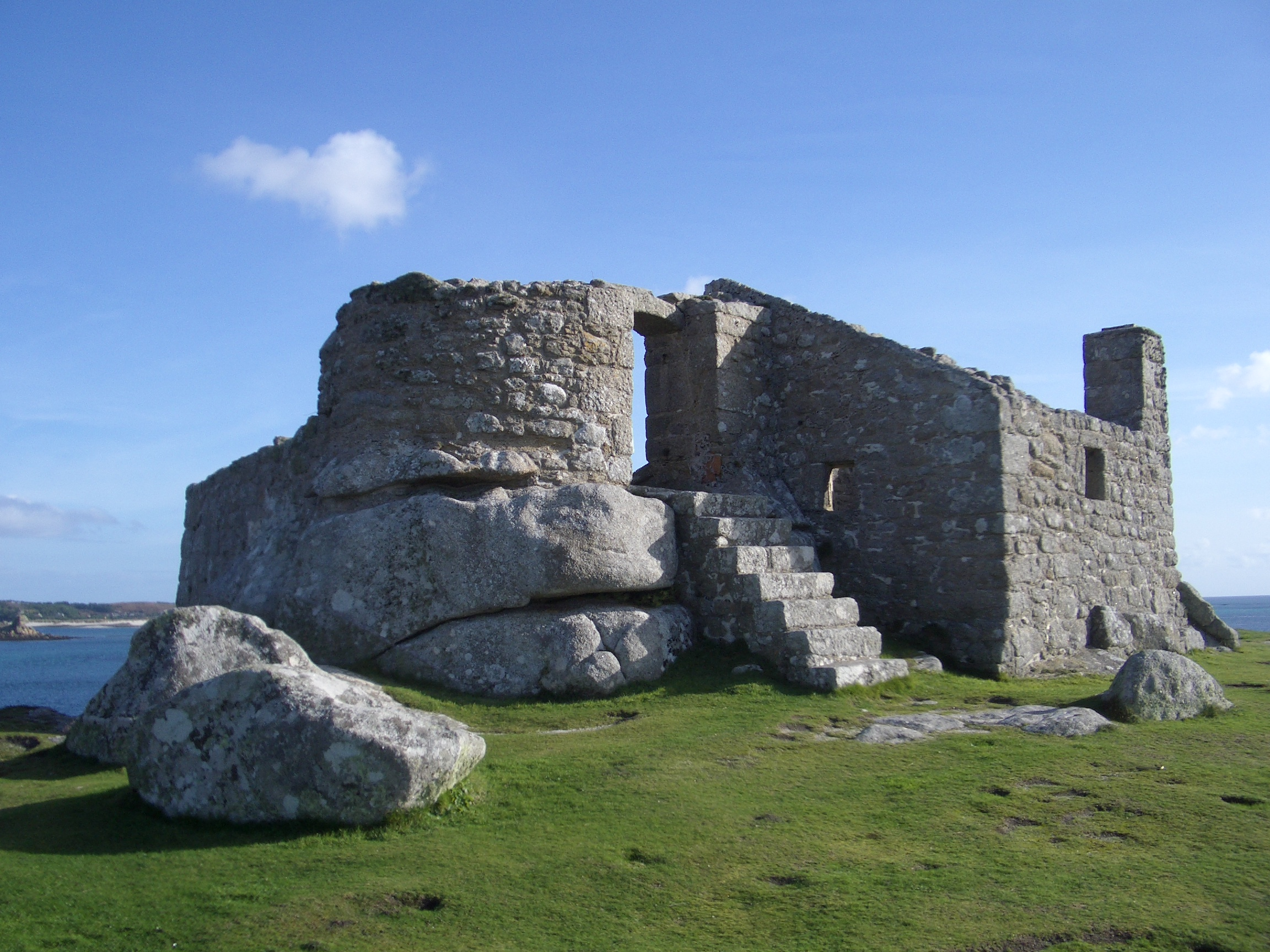
- Old Blockhouse, viewed from the north-west

Site information
- Type: Gun tower
- Owner: English Heritage
- Open to the public: Yes
- Condition: Ruined

Location
- Shown within the Isles of Scilly
- Coordinates: 49°57′31″N 6°19′39″W grid reference SV897154

Site history
- Materials: Granite
- Events: 1651 invasion of the Scilly Isles

The Old Blockhouse, also known as the Dover Fort, is a 16th-century fortification on the island of Tresco in the Isles of Scilly. It was built between 1548 and 1551 by the government of Edward VI to protect the islands against French attack.

Overlooking Old Grimsby harbour and the anchorage of St Helen's Pool, the blockhouse would have housed a battery of two or three artillery pieces, positioned on a square gun platform on top of a rocky outcrop. An earthwork bank and a stone wall were built to protect it from attack from the beach and the landward sides respectively. A small room to provide living quarters for the garrison was later constructed on the side of the gun platform.

During the interregnum following the English Civil War, the Old Blockhouse was occupied by the Royalists and it was attacked by the Parliamentary forces of Sir Robert Blake in 1651. Blake's naval guns out-ranged those of the fort, and, after fierce fighting, the blockhouse was taken. A battery of guns was maintained at the blockhouse until at least the 1750s, but by the end of the 18th century the fortification was disused and in ruins.

After 1922 the blockhouse was placed into the guardianship of the state by the lessee of the island, Arthur Dorrien-Smith, and in the 21st century it is controlled by English Heritage and open to tourists. It is protected as a scheduled monument under UK law.

== History ==
=== 16th century ===
The Old Blockhouse was built between 1548 and 1551 to protect the Scilly Isles against French attack. Tensions with France had grown during the reign of Henry VIII and spilled over into war in 1538. Henry initially responded by fortifying the coasts of England, constructing new artillery forts designed to defend against the longer-range cannons that were becoming common in the 16th century. Henry's son, the nine-year-old Edward VI, inherited the throne in 1547, facing renewed war with France. Edward Seymour was made the Lord Protector to the King, and he appointed his brother, Thomas, as England's Lord High Admiral. Thomas inspected the Scilly Isles personally and concluded that they were vulnerable to a French invasion.

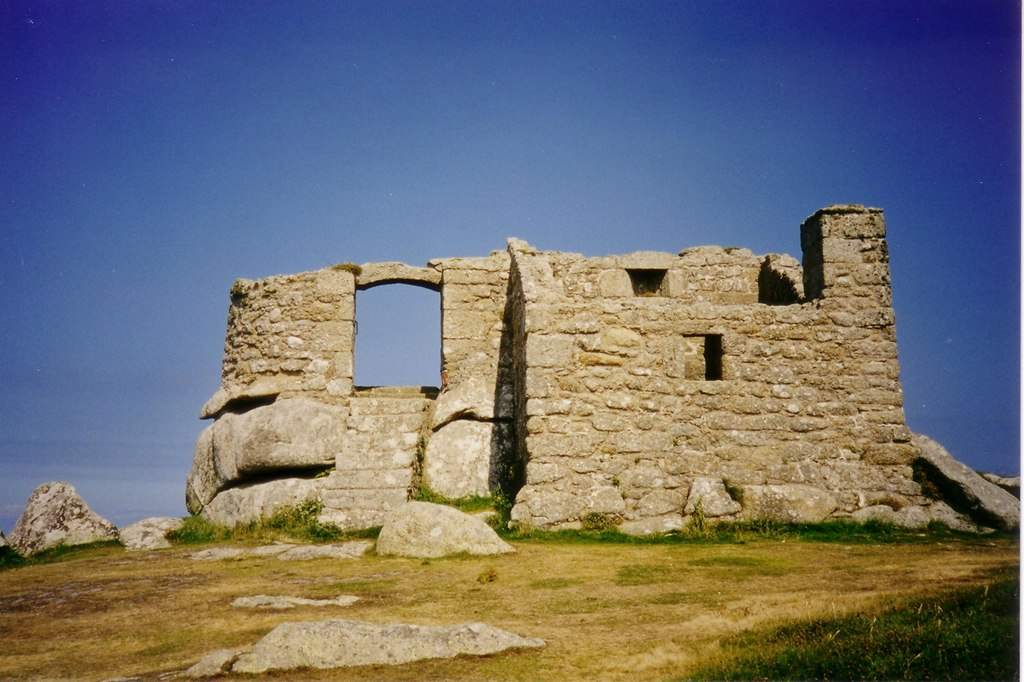
Old Blockhouse, viewed from the south-west

As a result of the inspection, Sir Francis Flemming, the Lieutenant-General of the Ordnance, was tasked in February 1558 to improve the defences on the islands, supported by a shipment of lead to help with construction, and money raised from the dissolution of the monasteries in England. The building work initially focused on the island of Tresco and was carried out under the direction of John Killigrew, the captain of Pendennis Castle in Falmouth. Tresco was in need of modern defences, but Killigrew also wanted to use the work programme to increase his political influence on the island.

The Old Blockhouse was built as part of this programme of work. The blockhouse was positioned on high ground to protect the Old Grimsby harbour, overlooking both the harbour and the nearby anchorage of St Helen's Pool. When complete, it would have held a battery of two to three guns, which could have fired on targets attempting to enter the harbour, or engaged ships approaching the Scilly Isles from the north-east.

Edward Seymour fell from power in 1549, and after his removal a new survey was carried out by Captain William Tyrell, in part to confirm that the new fortifications were suitably located across the islands. Building work across the Scilly Isles continued, expanding to include the neighbouring island of St Mary's, and at least 540 oak trees from South Wales were dispatched to the islands in early 1550, since the islands lacked suitable sources of timber of their own. Orders were given in 1551 to send bows, arrows and the ingredients required to make gunpowder to the islands, where construction teams were kept at work through to the end of 1552.

The Old Blockhouse appears to have been completed, but the Crown's resources had become badly stretched and the decision was taken at the end of 1552 to curtail further expenditure on the Scilly Isles. Between 1548 and 1552, a total of £3,123 had been spent on improving the fortifications on the islands; a 1579 survey suggested that, with the cost of the garrisons, the project had come to a total of £6,000. (Note: It is difficult to accurately compare 16th-century and modern prices or incomes. £3,123 could equate to between £809,000 and £9,700,000 in 2012 terms, depending on the measure used. For comparison, the smaller defences along the south coast of England each cost Henry VIII between £500 and £1,000 to build, and the larger forts as much as £10,000.) Edward's successor, Queen Mary I, intended to establish a garrison of 150 soldiers on the islands, but it is uncertain if these numbers were ever achieved.

=== 17th century ===
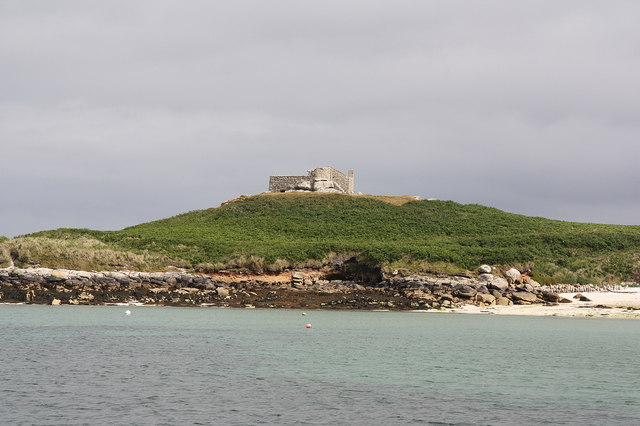
The blockhouse, viewed from across Old Grimsby harbour

The Old Blockhouse saw military action in 1651 during the interregnum after the end of the English Civil War, making it one of the very few of England's coastal defences to have ever seen actual fighting. The Scilly Isles were supporters of Charles I during the civil war, and after a short period in Parliamentary control rebelled in favour of Charles in 1648. Tresco formed a base for Royalists privateers and Parliament became concerned that the Dutch, then hostile to England, might counter the piracy by occupying the islands, gaining a foothold they could then use against England. In 1651 Parliament sent Sir Robert Blake in charge of a naval task force to retake the islands.

Blake arrived at St Helen's Pool in April 1651 and set about taking the island of Tresco, attacking the harbour of Old Grimsby and the blockhouse. Blake deployed a force of men in small boats, but they landed on the wrong island and had to be recalled to the ships. The next day the men landed on the beaches below the blockhouse; fighting ensued and the attackers were driven back. Blake's men made another landing which also saw fierce resistance, and the guns of the blockhouse were probably turned on the landing parties. Around 15 of the assault force were killed, but the guns of Blake's ships guns had a longer range than those of the blockhouse and Old Grimsby fell. Blake went on to use Tresco as a basis for taking St Mary's.

The blockhouse remained an important fortification after the invasion. Parliament invested £1,050 in the islands' defences and carried out a survey in 1652, calling the blockhouse the "Dover Fort. (Note: It is difficult to accurately compare 17th-century and modern prices or incomes. £1,050 could equate to between £137,000 and £2,220,000 in 2012 terms, depending on the measure used.) In 1660, Charles II was restored to the throne and Edward Sherburne was sent to the Scilly Isles to inspect the defences; he recommended that repairs be carried out to the Old Blockhouse.

=== 18th-21st centuries ===
The Crown, in the form of the Duchy of Cornwall, leased the islands in 1687 to the Godolphin family, followed by August Smith in 1831. The blockhouse was inspected by Christian Lilly in 1715, on the orders of the Duke of Marlborough; he reported that it was "very much decayed", with only the walls standing, but recommended that it be repaired at a cost of £28. (Note: It is difficult to accurately compare 18th-century and modern prices or incomes. £28 could equate to between £3,710 and £51,100 in 2012 terms, depending on the measure used.) The antiquary William Borlase noted during his 1752 visit that there was a battery of guns at the Old Blockhouse, guarding the harbour, but by the time that the writer John Troutbeck saw the site at the end of the century, the guns had been removed. The blockhouse walls remained in good condition, however, and Troutbeck considered that it would still have military utility if brought back into service.

In 1922, the lease passed to Arthur Dorrien-Smith, who agreed to pass several properties on Tresco, including the blockhouse, into the guardianship of the Ministry of Works. In the 21st century, the blockhouse is controlled by English Heritage, the successor to the ministry, and open to tourists. It is protected as a scheduled monument under UK law.

== Architecture ==
Plan of the Old Blockhouse: A - earth bank; B - small room; C - gun platform; D - rocky outcrop

The Old Blockhouse comprises a paved, square gun platform, approximately 7 metres (23 ft) by 6.5 metres (21 ft), with 1 metre (3 ft 3 in) thick, low granite walls, which were probably somewhat taller when they were first built. It is built on top of a rocky outcrop, which forms part of the lower courses of the walls, and is reached by a flight of stairs. The platform originally had embrasures on the north-west and north-east corners, with the walls probably forming a parapet, although it is possible there may also have been a roof to the platform.

In the south-west corner of the platform is a lean-to, which may have been either a powder locker or a shelter for the blockhouse watch; a compartment in the south wall might have also been used to store ammunition. A small room, 2.8 metres (9 ft 2 in) by 3.6 metres (12 ft), was added on to the west, after the construction of the main building, possibly during the English Civil War. (Note: The small room blocks an existing window in the main building, suggesting it was added after the main construction, although there is no visible join where the two walls meet, as would normally be the case for a later addition.) This was equipped with windows and a fireplace, and would have formed living quarters for the troops.

An earthwork bank defends the landward side of the blockhouse, described variously as between around 0.5 metres (1 ft 8 in) and 2 metres (6 ft 7 in) high, similar to those found around forts of this period along the Thames River in England. (Note: Historian Allan Marshall Brodie, for example, gives 0.5 metres (1 ft 8 in), while English Heritage records it as 2 metres (6 ft 7 in) high.) There are also the remains of a defensive stone wall on the seaward side of the blockhouse, although much of the wall has been destroyed by coastal erosion.

The design of the blockhouse is conservative for the period, and echoes that of the forts built during the reign of Henry VIII. This is in contrast to the nearby fortification of Harry's Walls, built at the same time as the blockhouse, but which adopted a more contemporary design that employed bastions.

== Bibliography ==
- Ashbee, Paul (1986). "Ancient Scilly: Retrospect, Aspect and Prospect". Cornish Archaeology. 25: 186–219.
- Borlase, William (1756). Observations on the Ancient and Present State of the Islands of Scilly, and their Importance to the Trade of Great Britain. Oxford, [England]: W. Jackson. OCLC 64415301.
- Brodie, Allan (2010). "The Tudor Defences of Scilly". English Heritage Historical Review. 5: 24–43. doi:10.1179/175201611X13079771582385.
- Brodie, Allan (2011a). "The Garrison, St Mary's, Isles of Scilly: The Defences of the Garrison 1500–1945, Survey Report". Research Department Report Series. London, UK: English Heritage. ISSN 1749-8775.
- Brodie, Allan (2011b). "Isles of Scilly: Military Defences, 1540-1951: Earthwork Sites and Minor Features". Research Department Report Series. London, UK: English Heritage. ISSN 1749-8775.
- Bowden, Mark; Brodie, Allan (2011a). "Defending Scilly". Research News. 16: 8–11.
- Bowden, Mark; Brodie, Allan (2011b). Defending Scilly. London, UK: English Heritage. ISBN 9781848020436.
- O'Neil, B. H. St John (1961). Ancient Monuments of the Isles of Scilly (2nd ed.). London, UK: Her Majesty's Stationery Office. OCLC 58256.
- Troutbeck, John (1796). A Survey of the Ancient and Present State of the Scilly Islands. nl: Sherborne, Goadby and Lerpiniere. OCLC 22406050.
