= Corps of Invalids =

Corps of Invalids could refer to:

- Corps of Invalids (Great Britain) (1688–1802)
- The Corps of Invalids which formed part of the 1st American Regiment (1783–1784) in the Continental Army
