= Master gunner =

Military appointment for artillery experts

Master gunner is an appointment of the warrant officer rank in the British and United States armed forces.

== United Kingdom ==
In the British Army's Royal Artillery master gunners are experts in the technical aspects of gunnery. They fill advisory rather than command posts. The appointment is split into two classes: Master gunners 2nd and 1st class, both holding the rank of warrant officer class 1. Formerly there was also an appointment of master gunner 3rd class, who held the rank of warrant officer class 2. The appointment of master gunner is unrelated to that of Master Gunner, St James's Park, the ceremonial head of the Royal Regiment of Artillery.

=== Historical usage ===
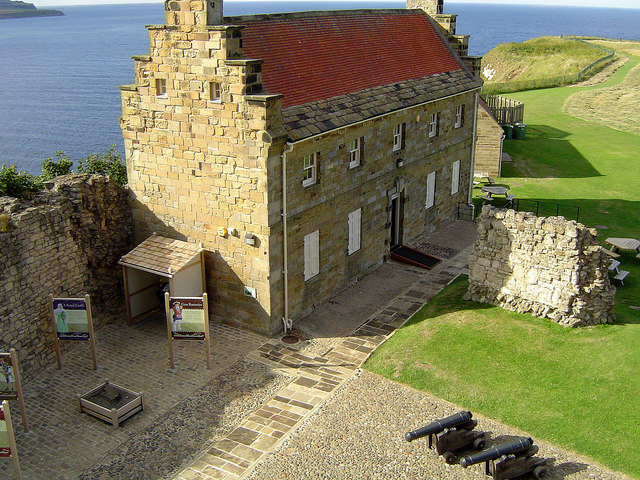
The Master Gunner's House (1748), Scarborough Castle.

The title of master gunner was in use from at least the fourteenth century for the person commanding a team of gunners and directing the use and upkeep of one or more guns. The term gradually fell out of use on board ship (where the term 'gunner' took its place), and in the field (where the command structure of artillery trains took precedence). It remained in use, however, in coastal fortifications, from the time of Henry VIII through to 1956 when Britain's coastal artillery network was disbanded.

Initially, master gunners had executive command of their guns in times of battle, but this responsibility ceased when commissioned artillery officers began to be appointed to coastal forts and garrisons. Thereafter, the artillerymen took charge of aiming and firing the guns; but within each fortification, the master gunner retained responsibility for gun maintenance and preparation, and for the safe storage and supply of ammunition. They were also responsible for firing gun salutes, and other routine tasks. To carry out these duties, each master gunner had to recruit a team of 'district gunners' to serve under them: in the 18th and 19th centuries, detachments of 'invalids' (usually war-wounded artillerymen) often fulfilled this task; otherwise, the master gunner would have to try to recruit regular artillery from a nearby garrison (or else local militiamen, volunteers or even civilians might be seconded). A list of 1824 records 59 master gunners at separate stations around the coast of the British Isles, and 90 'invalids' assisting them. (The number of invalid artillery was set to increase, to 450 by 1859.) It is noted that every master gunner listed had served a minimum of sixteen years in the Royal Artillery prior to being appointed to that position.

==== Master Gunner of England ====
For some 250 years, an official of the Board of Ordnance held the office of "Master Gunner of England" (Master Gunner of Great Britain after 1707). Mention of the office first occurs around 1485–1506; appointments were made by Letters Patent under the Great Seal of the Realm, and were normally for life.

Until its dissolution in 1855, the Board (or Office) of Ordnance provided and operated all artillery pieces used in the field of battle and in defensive garrisons. The Master Gunner of England served as the principal technical expert to the Crown in all aspects of artillery. He maintained a register of all certified gunners in the realm and oversaw their training, he maintained a list of all guns in forts, on board ships and elsewhere and monitored their state of readiness, and also had responsibilities for proving guns and gunpowder.

Proof testing initially took place in an area known as the 'Artillery Garden' just north of the Tower of London (the Board's headquarters), and the Master Gunner of England was provided with an official residence nearby. As weapons were growing more powerful, however, it became desirable for them to be proved in less populated areas, and this (among other things) led to the Crown in the 1670s purchasing an area of open land known as the Warren, at Woolwich in Kent, on the south bank of the Thames, an area that soon developed into a centre for arms manufacture, later renamed the Royal Arsenal. In 1685, the Artillery Garden was sold, and the master gunner and the local ordnance storekeeper were housed in the Warren in a Tudor mansion known as Tower Place. (Proof testing of guns and artillery continued at the Woolwich site until the mid-19th century, when it was moved to a larger and less populated area, Shoeburyness on the Essex coast.) The last master gunner to reside at Woolwich, Colonel George Brown, died in 1702; his successor Captain Thomas Silver already held the office of Master Gunner of Whitehall & St James's Park, and as such he continued to reside in the Gun House by the Park.

The office of Master Gunner of Great Britain became obsolescent after the Board of Ordnance established its Regiment of Artillery at Woolwich in 1716; in that year, the Master-General recommended its abolition as part of a series of economies, and it disappeared with the death of the last incumbent, Colonel James Pendlebury RA, in 1731.

=== Ireland ===
So long as Ireland was under British rule, there was an office of Master Gunner for Ireland. We have the name of at least two holders of the office, Thomas Elliott (died 1595) and Samuel Molyneux (died 1693). In Molyneux's case at least it seems to have been a sinecure.

== United States ==
Master gunner, commonly referred to as "Mike Golf," is also an advanced skill of the armor, infantry and artillery branches of the U.S. Army, and the tank and assault amphibious vehicle occupational field (OccFld 18) of the U.S. Marine Corps. It requires advanced schooling, and a high degree of skill. Only a few of those entering the training school graduate. The rank and rate of master gunner, along with a distinctive insignia, was used by the U.S. Army during World War I.

In the U.S. Army, master gunners are the technical and tactical experts for their weapons platform. They advise the commander on everything related to the vehicle platform and weapons system, and develop training materials to conduct gunnery and live-fire exercises. "I rely on my master gunners. I probe them for information based on how best to maintain our weapons as well as train our crews... They are there every step of the way from the time we put those crews together until the time we qualify them..." said Captain Kevin Zhang of the 1st Cavalry Division (1st Cav). "Master gunners are trained in methodology... What it boils down to is knowing the standard and being that person in the unit to enforce the standard, and to make sure that people are qualifying correctly... We're also experts in current gun maintenance so we can troubleshoot and fix a lot of problems and issues that may occur at the range, on the spot, instead of having to fall back to unit mechanics," explained Sergeant 1st Class Nathan Quarberg of 1st Cav.

The primary mission of the Army master gunner is to aid and assist commanders at all echelons in the planning, development, execution, and evaluation of all crew-served weapons related training (individual, crew, and collective).

The master gunner's specific duties are directed by the commander. Examples of their duties are:

- Develop or conduct training and certification of vehicle crew evaluators.
- Assist all elements within the unit concerning gunnery training.
- Forecast all ammunition and ranges for training.
- Manage gunnery records, gunnery skills testing records, and turbulence rosters.
- Coordinate and control training devices.
- Execute gunnery training.
- Supervise live-fire ranges to ensure all standards are followed; specifically:
  - Confirm screening and zero techniques
  - Coordinate target arrays, exposure times for all targets, and maneuver box verification
- Set up all ranges to make sure they meet the standards set forth in this manual
- Set up and conduct gunnery skills training, and evaluate the results.
- Advise the commander of the tactical capabilities of all weapons and weapon systems.

The master gunner's main responsibilities are listed above, but may change in scope, depending on the level that he is assigned. The master gunner should not be assigned additional duties other than those listed here. Unit gunnery training programs need a great deal of attention to be effective.

=== Master gunner's duties by position ===
Brigade master gunner

Works closely with the master gunners at lower echelons to ensure standards are uniform throughout the training programs. Develops the crew evaluator certification program. Provides any new information on ways to improve training. Helps develop and upgrade range facilities.

Battalion master gunner

Ensures continual education of the master gunners in the battalion. Helps the battalion commander and command sergeant major select master gunner school candidates. Develops new training techniques to improve crew training. Coordinates with the regiment for training assets. Certifies vehicle crew evaluators. Certifies range safety personnel.

Company master gunner

Coordinates with the battalion S3 to secure company gunnery training assets. Trains crew evaluator. Assists in troubleshooting and maintenance of weapons.
