= Listed buildings in Tresco, Isles of Scilly =

Tresco is a civil parish in the Isles of Scilly, Cornwall, England. The parish contains 16 buildings that are recorded in the National Heritage List for England as designated listed buildings. Of these, two are listed at Grade II*, the middle grade, and the others are at Grade II, the lowest grade. The largest island in the parish is Tresco, and the parish also includes Round Island with its listed lighthouse. The oldest listed building consists of the ruins of a Benedictine priory dating from about 1300.T he island had a strategic importance and this is reflected in its three listed fortifications. In the 19th century, a country house, Tresco Abbey, was built close to the ruins of the priory, and its grounds have been transformed into Tresco Abbey Gardens. (Note: The gardens are designated at Grade I in the Register of Historic Parks and Gardens.) Listed buildings in addition to those mentioned above include houses, farm outbuildings, a church, a monument, and the wall of a former kelp pit.

== Key ==
| Grade | Criteria |
|---|---|
| II* | Particularly important buildings of more than special interest |
| II | Buildings of national importance and special interest |

== Buildings ==
| Name and location | Photograph | Date | Notes | Grade |
|---|---|---|---|---|
| Remains of Tresco Priory; 49.94749°N 6.33024°W | | c. 1300 | The ruins of the Benedictine priory are in Tresco Abbey Gardens. They are in granite, and include parts of the walls of the nave and chancel and two arches. Also included are a 6th-century tombstone re-set into a doorway, and a chest tomb. The remains are a scheduled monument. | II |
| Old Blockhouse; 49.95857°N 6.32755°W | | 1548–52 (probable) | The blockhouse is in granite and has a rectangular plan. It consists of a platform enclosed by walls, approached by stairs to the east. There is a lean-to at the southeast containing a fireplace, and the remains of a room in the southeast corner of the platform. The blockhouse was built to defend Old Grimsby Harbour, and it is also a scheduled monument. | II |
| King Charles' Castle; 49.96354°N 6.34871°W | | 1550–54 | A granite fortification with a cruciform plan, consisting of a semi-hexagonal battery and domestic quarters behind. It originally had two storeys with five gun ports. Much of its material was used to build Cromwell's Castle, a replacement in a better position. The structure is also a scheduled monument. | II* |
| Cromwell's Castle; 49.96218°N 6.34955°W | | 1651–52 | A gun tower with a gun platform added in about 1740, all in granite. The building consists of a circular tower with a rectangular platform on the seaward side, an external staircase, and lean-tos containing a guardroom with a fireplace, and a latrine. Around the platform are six gun embrasures with segmental heads. The structure is also a scheduled monument. | II* |
| Borough Farm Outbuildings; 49.95382°N 6.32484°W | — | 18th century | This originated as a two-storey house with an integrated outbuilding to the left, and a lower single-storey outbuilding added to the left in the 19th century, all later used as an outbuilding. The building is in granite with a roof partly of pantiles, and partly of corrugated iron. Original features have been retained inside the building, including fireplaces and a bressumer. | II |
| Dolphin House; 49.95720°N 6.33633°W | | 1799 | A granite house with hipped slate roofs in late Georgian style. It has two storeys and an attic, with a symmetrical three-bay front, a two-storey rendered extension at the rear, and another extension to the east. The windows are sashes, those at attic level in hipped dormers. On the east wall is a sundial dated 1800. The boundary wall with its pyramidal gate piers is included in the listing. | II |
| 1 and 2 Dolphin Town; 49.95760°N 6.33542°W | | 18th to early 19th century | A pair of houses in colourwashed granite with slate roofs. They have two storeys, the left house with two bays, and the right house with three. The windows are sashes. | II |
| Walls to kelp pit 49.95872°N 6.33404°W | — | 18th to 19th century | This consists of three granite walls on the sides of a pit that originally had sloping sides and was lined with flat stones. The pit was used for drying kelp. | II |
| Dolphin Cottage; 49.95750°N 6.33516°W | — | Early 19th century (probable) | A colourwashed granite house with a slate roof. It has two storeys and a symmetrical three-bay front with an outshut at the rear. The windows are sashes. | II |
| Thatch; 49.95804°N 6.33519°W | — | Early 19th century | A colourwashed granite house with a slate roof, previously thatched. It has two storeys and a three-bay front with an outshut at the rear. The windows are sashes. | II |
| Tresco Abbey; 49.94780°N 6.32932°W | | 1843 | A country house that was extended in 1861 for Augustus Smith, and a tower added in 1891 for Thomas Dorrien-Smith. The house is in granite with slate roofs, it is in two and three storeys, and has a complex plan, consisting of a main block with a four-storey east tower, and west and southwest wings. Some of the windows are mullioned, others are sashes or casements, and there is an oriel window. | II |
| Gatehouse, Tresco Abbey; 49.94816°N 6.32982°W | — | 1843 | The gatehouse was built for Augustus Smith and is in Gothic style. It is built in granite with slate roofs, and has an L-shaped plan. To the left of the archway is a two-storey tower with a parapet and a pyramidal roof. To the right, and set at right angles, is a two-storey block with a flight of steps leading to a first floor doorway. Extending from the gatehouse to the southeast is a wall that is included in the listing. | II |
| Smith Monument; 49.94783°N 6.33600°W | | 1872 | The monument stands on Abbey Hill and consists of a rough granite obelisk about 15 feet (4.6 m) high on a base about 8 feet (2.4 m) square. On it are plaques to the memory of Augustus Smith and Thomas Dorrien-Smith, both Lords Proprietor of the Isles of Scilly. | II |
| St Nicholas' Church; 49.95785°N 6.33459°W | | 1877–79 | The church is built in granite, and has a slate roof with stone copings. It has a cruciform plan, consisting of a nave, transepts, a chancel, and a southeast tower. The tower has three stages, and a pyramidal roof. At the west end of the church is a rose window, and the other windows are lancets. | II |
| Round Island Lighthouse and house 49.97897°N 6.32305°W | | 1887 | The granite lighthouse, designed by William Tregarthen Douglass, is a circular tapering three-stage tower with square-headed windows, surmounted by a cast iron cupola with a cast iron parapet, lattice windows, and a curved conical roof. Attached is a square single-storey house with a flat roof. This has five bays, four sash windows, a central porch, and an eight-pane casement window. | II |
| Cresset; 49.94682°N 6.33031°W | | Undated | The cresset (firebasket) was originally in the lighthouse on St Agnes, and is now in Tresco Abbey Gardens. It is in cast iron and consists of two circular tapering reversed halves, the upper part forming a basket. It is thought to be the only surviving lighthouse grate in the British Isles. | II |
