= Harry's Walls =

Fort in St Mary's, Isles of Scilly, UK

- St Mary's in the Isles of Scilly
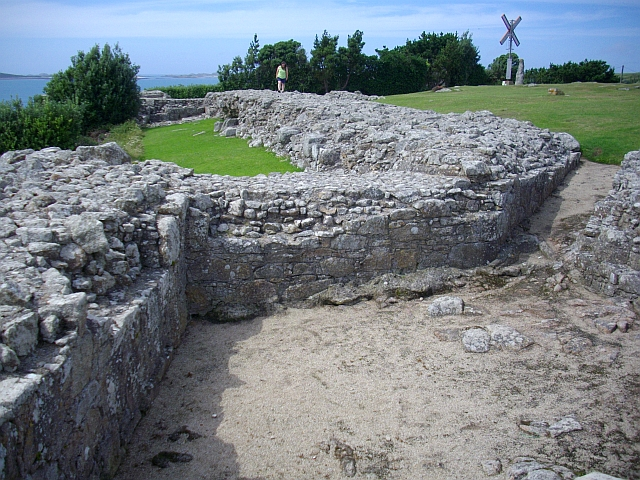
- The remains of the south-west side

Site information
- Type: Artillery fort
- Owner: English Heritage
- Open to the public: Yes
- Condition: Uncompleted

Location
- Harry's Walls
- Location within Isles of Scilly
- Coordinates: 49.91836°N 6.30674°W

Site history
- Materials: Granite

Harry's Walls are the remains of an unfinished artillery fort, started in 1551 by the government of Edward VI to defend the island of St Mary's in the Isles of Scilly. Constructed to defend the harbour of Hugh Town from possible French attack, the fortification incorporated Italianate-style bastions with protective orillons and would have been the most advanced design in the kingdom at the time. It was not completed, probably due to a shortage of funds and the passing of the invasion threat, and only the south-west side remains. In the 21st century, Harry's Walls are managed by English Heritage and open to visitors.

== History ==
In the 16th century, the Isles of Scilly were ruled by the King of England. They were an important strategic location on the route between mainland Europe, Ireland and Scotland, but threatened by the forces of France and Spain. Under Henry VIII, a sequence of defensive works called the Device programme had been built to protect the English mainland from French attack, but although a garrison was established at Ennor Castle on the island of St Mary's, no actual construction work was carried out in the islands. After Henry's death in 1547, his nine-year-old son, Edward VI, assumed the throne, with the government controlled by Edward Seymour, 1st Duke of Somerset. His brother, Thomas, inspected Scilly, resulting in new investments in their defences, initially focused on the island of Tresco. The Duke fell from power in 1549 and a fresh survey was conducted by Captain William Tyrrell; work then began on protecting the island of St Mary's.

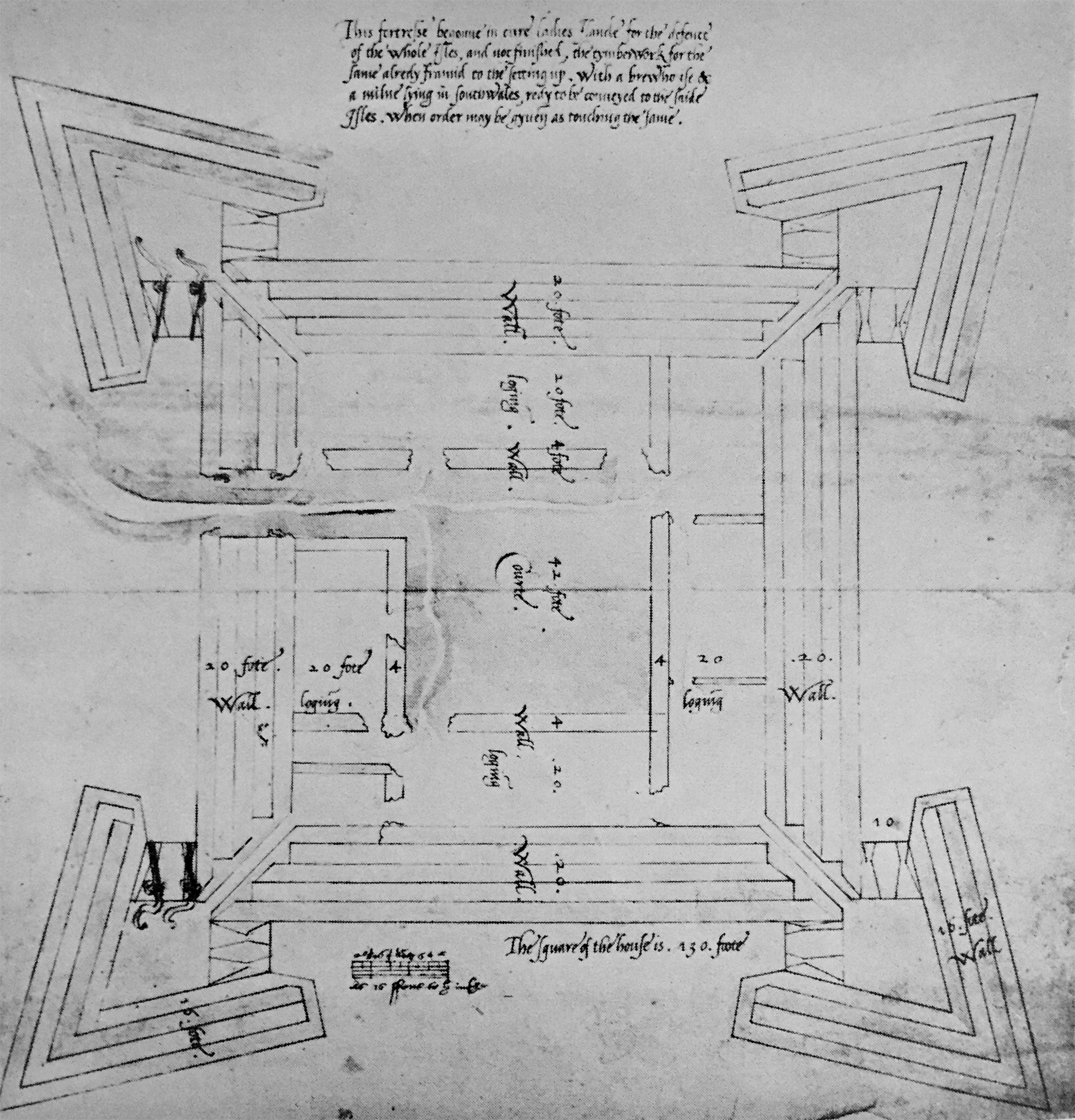
Diagram from the early 1550s depicting the intent for Harry's Walls, produced after the work had started

In May 1551, John Killigrew, the captain of Pendennis Castle in Falmouth, was ordered to construct a fort on St Mary's, probably with the intent of guarding the entrance to the new harbour at Hugh Town. His instructions stated that it was to be positioned "upon the little hill betwixt the freshe water and St. Marie Roode", and was accompanied by a promise that lead would be sent for the roofing that summer. A document from the early 1550s noted that a brewhouse and a mill were ready to be sent to St Mary's from South Wales as part of the project, to be installed by the fresh water pond. The name "Harry's Walls" is the result of the defences being popularly, but incorrectly, attributed to Edward's father, Henry.

Contemporary plans showed an intention to create a square fortification with four angular, "arrow-head" bastions with protective orillons, with living quarters arranged around a square courtyard for the garrison in the centre. It was intended to develop the Italianate ideas first introduced in Portsmouth and Yarmouth under Henry, and would have been what the historian Andrew Saunders considers to be "the most advanced piece of military engineering for its date to be seen in this country". In 1554, two light artillery guns called sakers were reported installed in the fort. During the reign of Mary I, an unsuccessful attempt was made to create a garrison of 150 men on the island in 1554, partially to provide manpower to complete the project, and in 1591 proposals were again put forward to complete the work.

The defences were never completed; instead, new defences were constructed at Star Castle in 1593 and the remains of Harry's Walls were used in the 17th and 18th centuries for the dumping of rubbish. Earlier analysis blamed the poor siting of Harry's Walls for the abandonment of the project. The antiquary William Borlase was critical of the fort during his 1752 visit, noting that it had been "begun injudiciously" in a poor location. The writer John Troutbeck, who visited at the end of the 18th century, argued that if the fortification had been completed, "it would have been of little use, being placed too far within the head lands, and commanding none of the sounds to any effect. During the 20th century, criticism was levied about its position in relation to the anchorage, and about the size of the site, which was felt to be both too small for the proposed design and too difficult to defend.

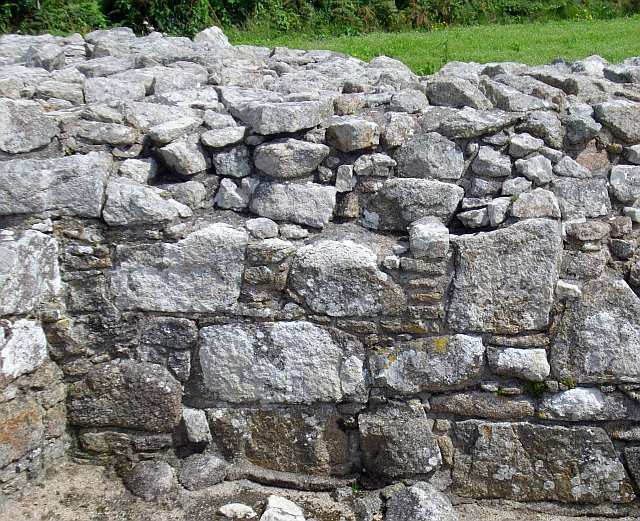
Detail of the granite walling

More recent research suggests that that fortification actually commanded the harbour adequately. No single site would have been completely effective due to the rugged coastline, and that Harry's Walls may have been designed to work in concert with another fort. Furthermore, the fort would have fitted easily into its proposed location and have been easy to defend, due to the surrounding water and marshland. Instead, the high costs of England's wider fortification programme - Edward's government spent an unsustainable £35,228 on construction work during the five years of his reign - are blamed for making its completion unviable, particularly once the French invasion threat had passed. (Note: It is difficult to accurately compare 16th-century and modern prices or incomes. £35,228 in 1551 could equate to between £159 million and £4,728 million in 2015 terms, depending on the measure used. For comparison, the smaller defences along the south coast of England each cost Henry VIII between £500 and £1,000 to build, and the larger forts as much as £10,000.)

The south-west side of the fort, comprising two bastions and a connecting curtain wall made of granite blocks and rubble, is well-preserved. The angular bastions and their orillons are 21 by 5 metres (69 by 16 ft) across and 2.3 metres (7 ft 7 in) high, while the curtain wall is 27 metres (89 ft) long and 1.7 metres (5 ft 7 in) high. The exterior blocks have been robbed in various places, exposing the rubble interior. An unfinished defensive ditch, 25 metres (82 ft) long, 8 metres (26 ft) wide and 1.2 metres (3 ft 11 in) deep runs along the outside. A prehistoric standing stone, later used to help navigation at sea, is positioned just to the north of the fort, with a modern navigational aid positioned alongside it. In the 21st century these remains are managed by English Heritage and open to the public. The remains are protected under UK law as an ancient monument.

== See also ==
- Listed buildings in Tresco, Isles of Scilly

== Bibliography ==
- Ashbee, Paul (1986). "Ancient Scilly: Retrospect, Aspect and Prospect". Cornish Archaeology. 25: 186–219.
- Borlase, William (1756). Observations on the Ancient and Present State of the Islands of Scilly, and Their Importance to the Trade of Great Britain. Oxford, UK: W. Jackson. OCLC 64415301.
- Brodie, Allan (2010). "The Tudor Defences of Scilly". English Heritage Historical Review. 5: 24–43. doi:10.1179/175201611X13079771582385.
- Brodie, Allan (2011). "The Garrison, St Mary's, Isles of Scilly: The Defences of the Garrison 1500–1945, Survey Report". Research Department Report Series. London, UK: English Heritage. ISSN 1749-8775.
- Bowden, Mark (2011). "Military Defences 1540–1951: Earthwork Sites and Minor Features". Research Department Report Series. London, UK: English Heritage. ISSN 1749-8775.
- Bowden, Mark; Brodie, Allan (2011a). "Defending Scilly". Research News. 16: 8–11.
- Bowden, Mark; Brodie, Allan (2011b). Defending Scilly. London, UK: English Heritage. ISBN 9781848020436.
- O'Neil, B. H. St John (1961). Ancient Monuments of the Isles of Scilly (2nd ed.). London, UK: Her Majesty's Stationery Office. OCLC 58256.
- Saunders, Andrew (1989). Fortress Britain: Artillery Fortifications in the British Isles and Ireland. Liphook, UK: Beaufort. ISBN 1855120003.
- Troutbeck, John (1796). A Survey of the Ancient and Present State of the Scilly Islands. nl: Sherborne, Goadby and Lerpiniere. OCLC 22406050.
