= Old Grimsby =

Coordinates: 49°57′36″N 6°20′01″W

Old Grimsby: Cornish: Enysgrymm Goth
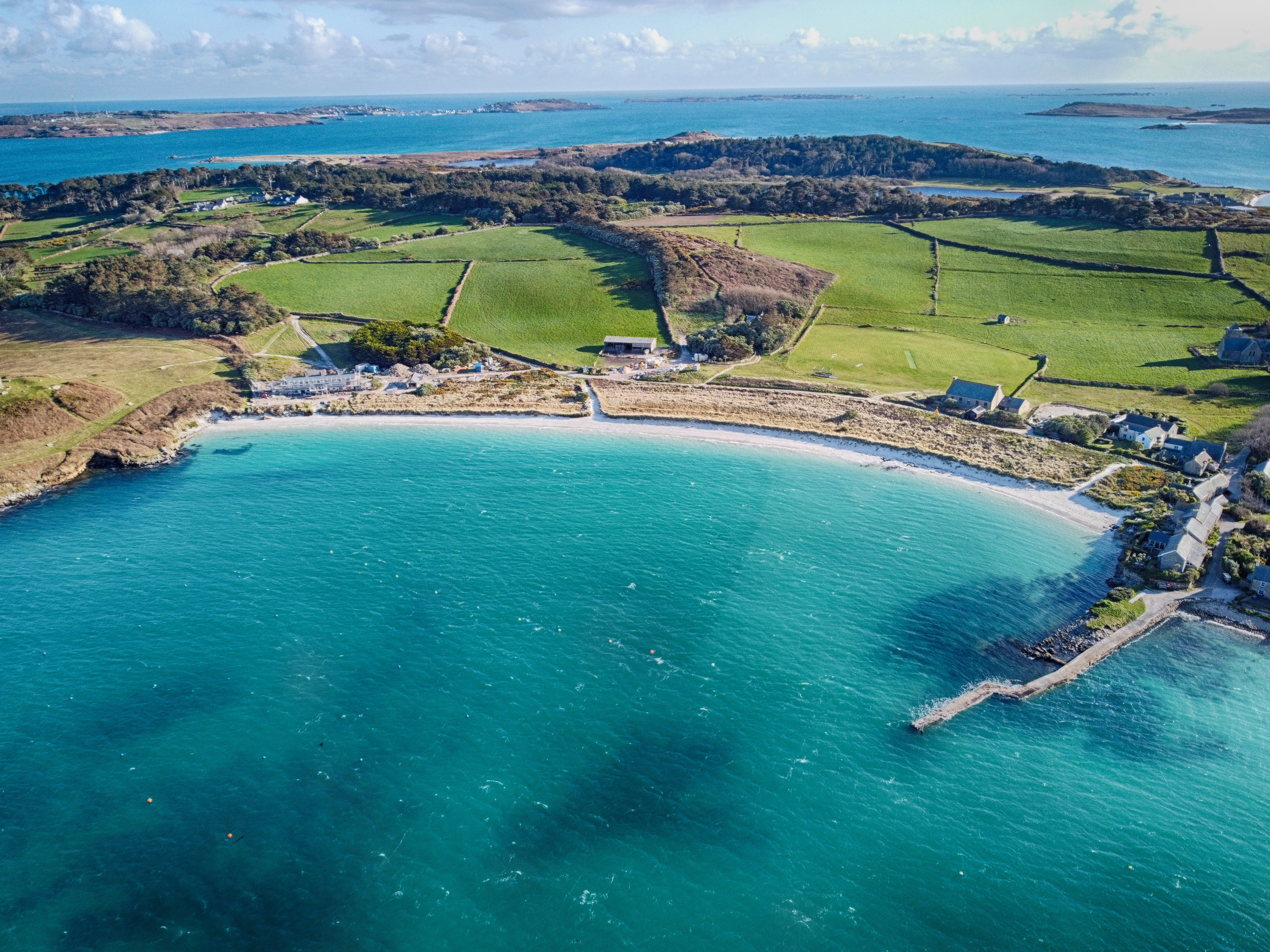
- Old Grimsby harbour and beachfront, at low tide

- Location within Isles of Scilly
- Civil parish: Tresco
- Unitary authority: Isles of Scilly
- Ceremonial county: Cornwall
- Region: South West
- Country: England
- Sovereign state: United Kingdom
- Post town: ISLES OF SCILLY
- Postcode district: TR24
- Dialling code: 01720
- Police: Devon and Cornwall
- Fire: Isles of Scilly
- Ambulance: South Western
- UK Parliament: St Ives

Old Grimsby (Cornish: Enysgrymm Goth) is a coastal settlement on the island of Tresco in the Isles of Scilly, England. It is located on the east side of the island and there is a quay. At the southern end of the harbour bay is the Blockhouse, a 16th-century fort built to defend the harbour from attack.

The northern part of the settlement is (now usually historically) known as Northward (or Norrard).

The island's community centre is located here, and adjacent to it is the primary school for Tresco and Bryher. There is also a café (Ruin Beach) by the beach in the main part of the settlement.

To the southwest, on the road to New Grimsby, is the hamlet of Dolphin Town, where the island's parish church is located (St Nicholas's Church).

== Gallery ==
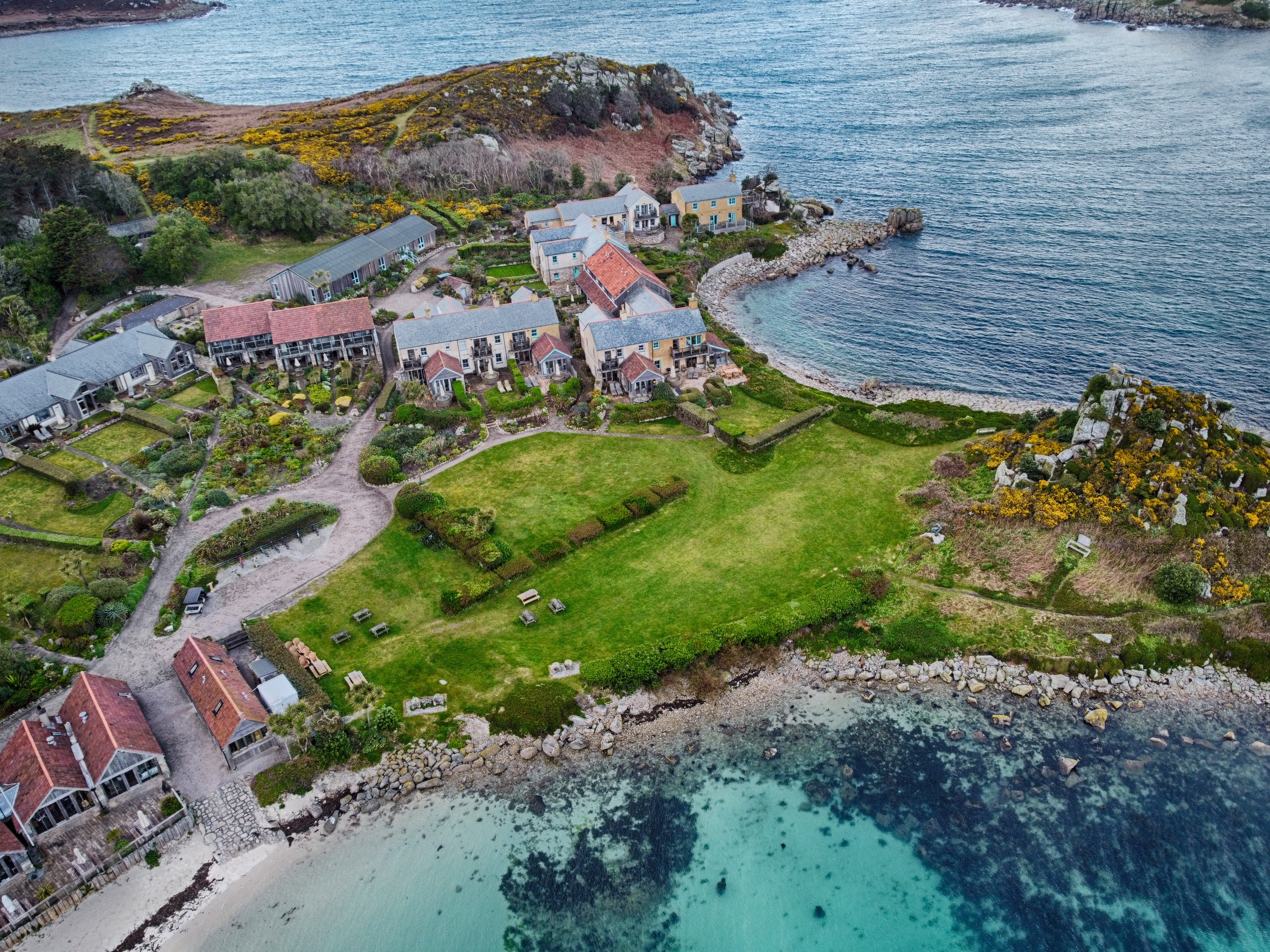

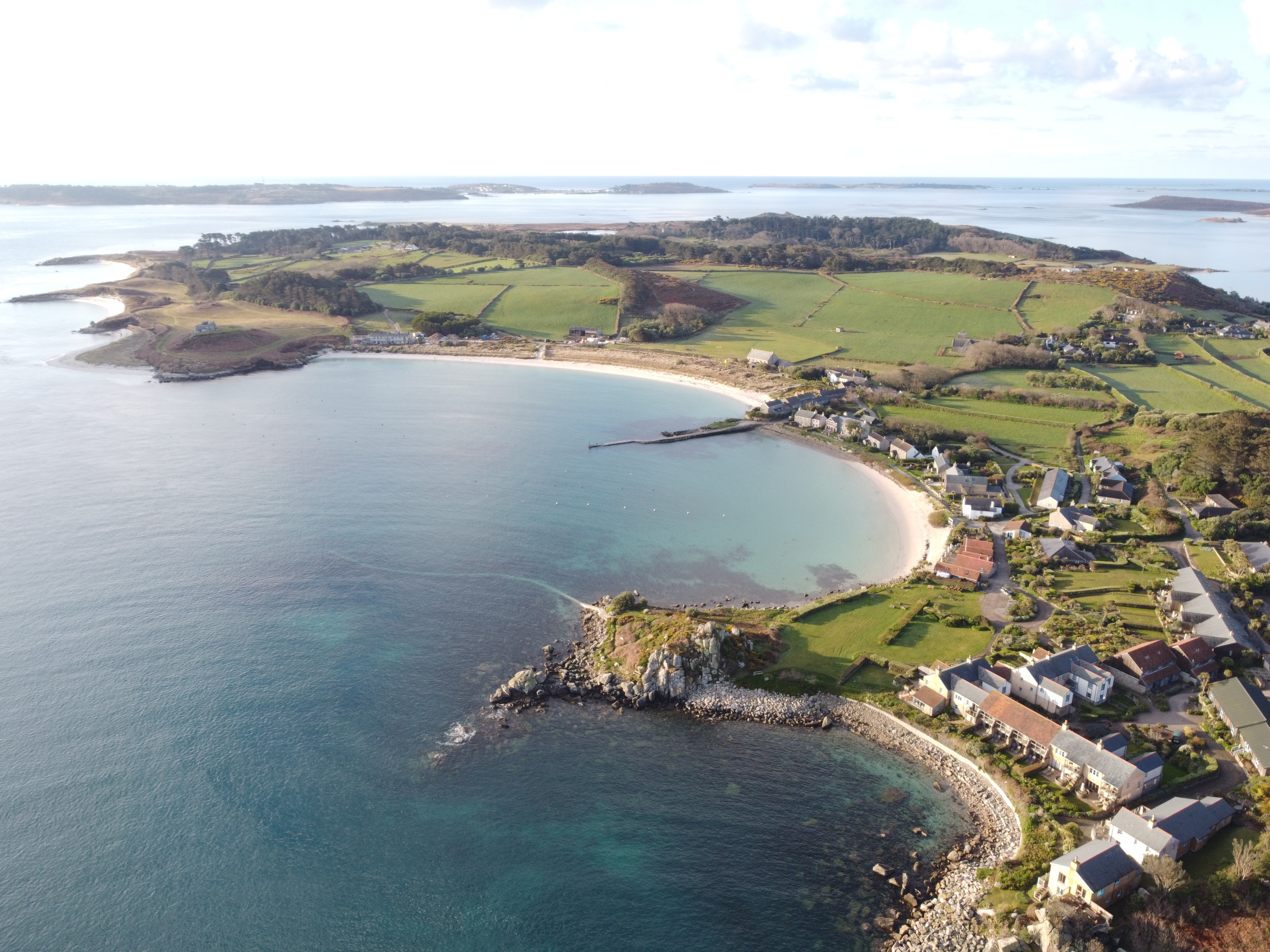
