= Corps of Invalids (Great Britain) =

Military unit of the English and British armies formed in 1688 and disbanded in 1802

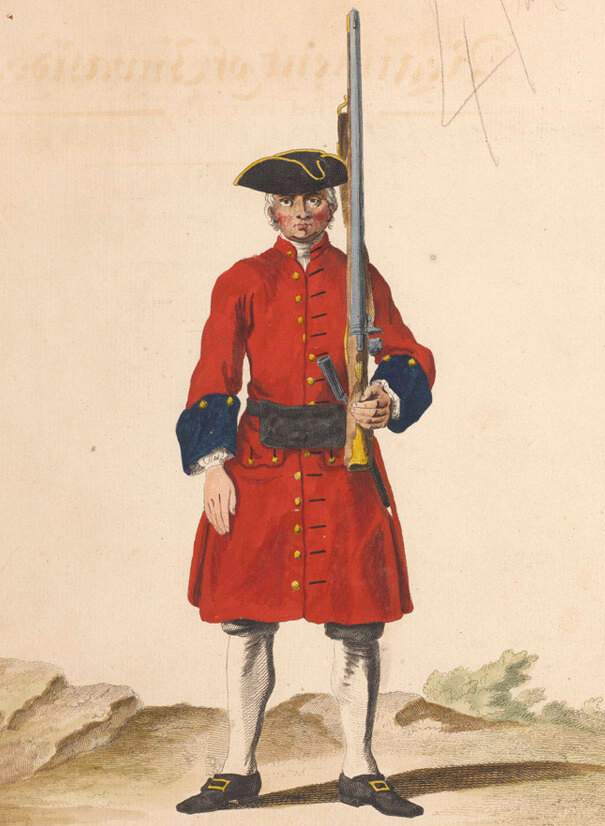
- c. 1742 engraving of a regimental private
- Active: 1688–1802
- Country: England (1688–1707); Great Britain (1707–1801); United Kingdom (1801–1802)
- Branch: English Army; British Army
- Type: Infantry
- Role: Garrison duty
- Part of: Royal Hospital Chelsea

The Corps of Invalids was an infantry unit of the English and British armies that was formed in 1688 and disbanded in 1802. Raised to provide garrison troops for home defence duties, the corps was rapidly expanded or decreased in size as need arose, playing a key role in regulating the manpower requirements of the British army. Its men—including ranking officers—were all veterans chosen by the commissioners of the Royal Hospital Chelsea to serve in lieu of residing at the hospital or receiving a receipt of a pension. They were generally those who were too old, weak, or wounded to serve in the regular army. Most men served at least six years with the corps, though one could serve so long as he remained physically able. Clad in grey coats with blue facings early on, corp members were later issued the same red coat with blue facings as those worn by the patients of the Chelsea Hospital. The corps was organised into a number of independent companies that were garrisoned at key points in the country, freeing up units of the regular army for service overseas.

The original three companies of the corps were raised by James II of England in 1688 to bolster his defences against a feared invasion by William of Orange. However the units played no part in the defence of London during the Glorious Revolution of that year. The invasion successful, the newly-crowned William disbanded the corps shortly afterwards, later reforming it in 1690 to provide manpower for the ongoing Nine Years' War. The corps was reduced in 1703 under the Duke of Marlborough but expanded again to help defend against the planned French invasion of Britain in 1708. It was intended to expand the corps to 26 companies during the War of the Spanish Succession but after the Peace of Utrecht it was reduced to just eight companies. Fears of another French invasion attempt caused the corps to be expanded to 26 companies during the early reign of George I and two companies garrisoned at Plymouth seem to have deterred the landing of the Duke of Ormonde there during the Jacobite rising of 1715.

The corps was maintained throughout the 18th century, providing units to meet the requirements of the Seven Years' War, American War of Independence and the French Revolutionary Wars. A full regiment of the corps, Edmund Fielding's Regiment – later called the "Royal Invalids", was raised in 1719. In addition a detachment of 500 men were made available for service as marines at sea in 1740. By 1791 the corps numbered more than 7,000 men. In 1802 the corps was disbanded with able-bodied men being absorbed into the new Royal Garrison Battalions and ultimately into regular line infantry regiments.

== Role and organisation ==
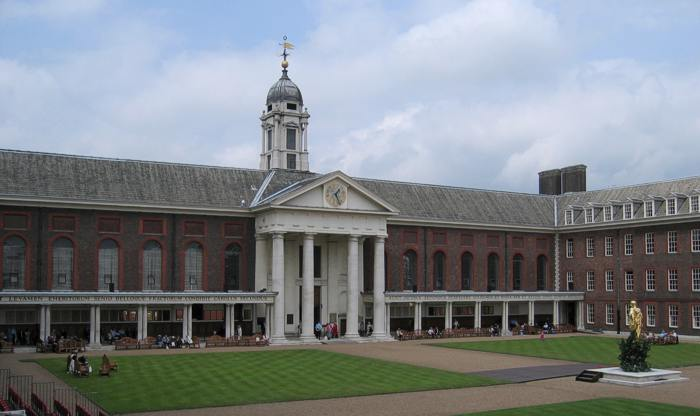
The Royal Hospital Chelsea

The Royal Hospital Chelsea had responsibility for administering the Corps of Invalids until its dissolution in 1802 and for the related Edmund Fielding's Regiment of Foot (later known as the Royal Invalids) until 1741. The corps's role was to provide garrisons to forts in the Great Britain, freeing up regular units of the British Army for service overseas. The unit was purely defensive in nature and had a presence in the majority of English garrisons throughout the 18th century.

The Royal Hospital served as a home for a select number of the most disabled or infirm veterans – the so-called "in-pensioners" – and administered the payment of pensions to the remainder of entitled veterans – the "out-pensioners" – who lived in their own homes. The number of in-pensioners never exceeded 500 at any time, comprising 14% of the total number of pensioners in 1703 and a mere 2% in 1785.

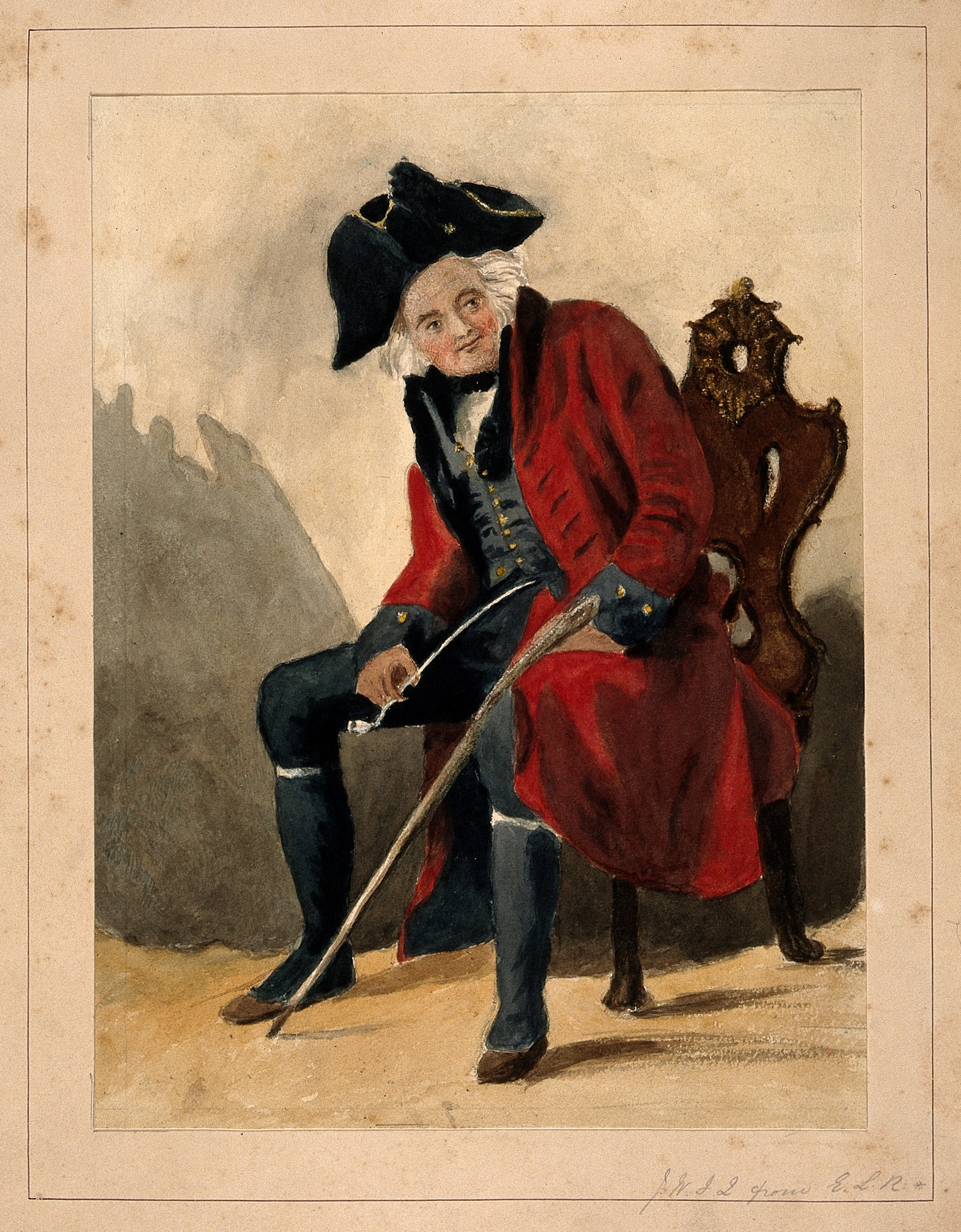
A Chelsea pensioner of the era

The corps played a vital role in regulating the manpower requirements of the British Army, increasing or decreasing in size as the need arose. New companies of the corps were raised by carrying out medical examinations of army out-pensioners to determine those who were fit for garrison service. The only requirement was that the man could walk without assistance and be "capable of fireing over a wall". The medical examinations originally required that the man travel to the hospital for examination, causing some difficulty and discomfort for the infirm – after 1754 examinations were conducted in each county town. The examinations also acted as a means of reducing the number of fraudulent pension payments to deceased or able-bodied men and of keeping records updated.

In addition to the pensioners, some men— whose disabilities were not severe enough to entitle them to an out-pension— were accepted immediately upon retirement from the regular army. The examination process was lengthy and it often took months after discharge for soldiers to join the corps or to receive a pension. The recruits were largely privates, there were limited positions for non-commissioned officers in the corps and the commissioners of the hospital were often unwilling to demote such men to the ranks to join the corps. Such men were kept as out-pensioners instead. The company commanders were appointed by the Commander-in-Chief of the Forces, they usually held the rank of captain but some times more senior field officers were appointed. The lieutenants and ensigns were nominated by the commissioners of the Chelsea Hospital. They were usually disabled former line infantry officers or men from the Life Guards (whose other ranks came traditionally from the gentry).

From February 1712 the recruitment system was reformed. The Hospital was instructed that every new recruit to the corps must have received wounds whilst in service or had spent 20 years in the army. Those who had been dismissed from service or officers who had sold their commissions were also barred. The Secretary of War took control of the selection of officers for the unit, choosing one from a shortlist of five for each vacancy.

The officers received their half-pay from the main army funds but the other ranks were paid by the hospital. The men of the corps were paid the equivalent of the out-pension, which was much below the rate of pay in the regular army. As a result a battalion of men cost the exchequer £2,295 per year rather than in excess of £12,000 that it cost for a regular line battalion. Due to the difference in pay men often preferred to re-enlist with line regiments if fit enough rather than serve with the invalids.

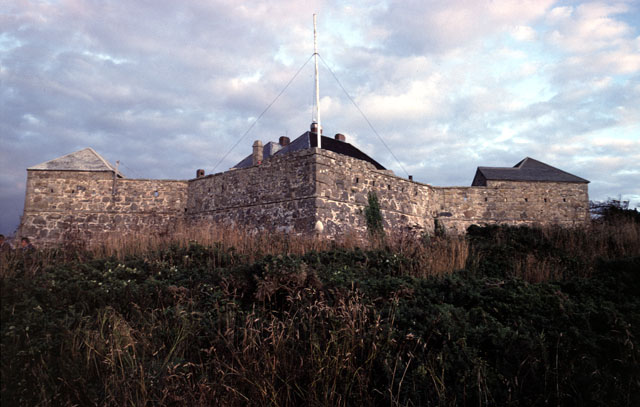
Star Castle was home to an Invalids garrison on the Isles of Scilly.

Men were often kept in the corps for a long time. Periods of duty in excess of 15 years were not uncommon and the majority of men served at least 6 years in the corps. As an example, the modal age of men in Scottish units was 61. The men were often posted to garrisons near to their home towns or were allowed to settle their families nearby. The Scottish and Irish garrisons were generally composed of Scottish and Irish invalids.

Due to their disabilities and advanced age, many members of the corps spent as much time on the sick roll as they did on duty (an exception being the garrison on the Isles of Scilly, which benefited from a warmer climate). Invalids were meant to be discharged when they became too old or infirm to carry out light duties. In addition their mental state and the impact of their service upon any dependents was considered. Until 1703 the officers of the corps had to seek permission from the Chelsea Hospital before discharging a man due to ill health. The vast majority (more than 99%) of those discharged became eligible to receive an out-pension. Before becoming eligible to receive this the discharged man was subject to a medical examination, in the intervening period the hospital paid for their travel and lodgings. Men that were discharged back to the hospital sometimes found that no lodgings were available for them there, the billets having been occupied by men of the Foot Guards, and were forced to bivouac in nearby fields.

The treatment and discipline of the men was generally more lenient than that of the regular army. However in 1716 the Corps of Invalids was brought within the scope of the Mutiny Act, coming for the first time under the same disciplinary arrangements as the regular army. In July 1717 two invalids were convicted of desertion, flogged and their pensions invalidated. Withholding of pay was also known to have been inflicted as a punishment.

== Uniform ==
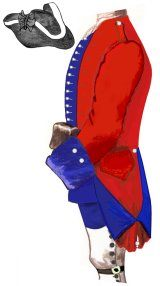
Uniform of the 41st Regiment of Foot (Royal Invalids), formerly Edward Fielding's Regiment circa 1760

When it was formed in 1688 no uniform was issued; the men of the corps seem to have worn the uniforms of their former regiments. During the reign of William III a uniform of a grey coat with blue linings was issued. This was different from the red coated uniform of the in-pensioners of the Royal Hospital and was of a lower quality of manufacture. For reasons of cost the corps later wore the same uniform as the hospital pensioners – red coats with blue linings and facings. Unlike in the regular army the men received no uniform allowance – with the hospital claiming it could not afford to do so. As a result the men were often poorly clothed until the hospital was ordered to provide funding from October 1704.

The 21st-century uniform of the Chelsea Pensioners maintains the link with the corps, with the buttons showing the initials "RCI" for the Royal Corps of Invalids.

== History ==
Compared to regular units the corps has received little attention by historians, with the exception of Edmund Fielding's Regiment – which evolved into a regular foot infantry unit.

=== Formation and Glorious Revolution ===
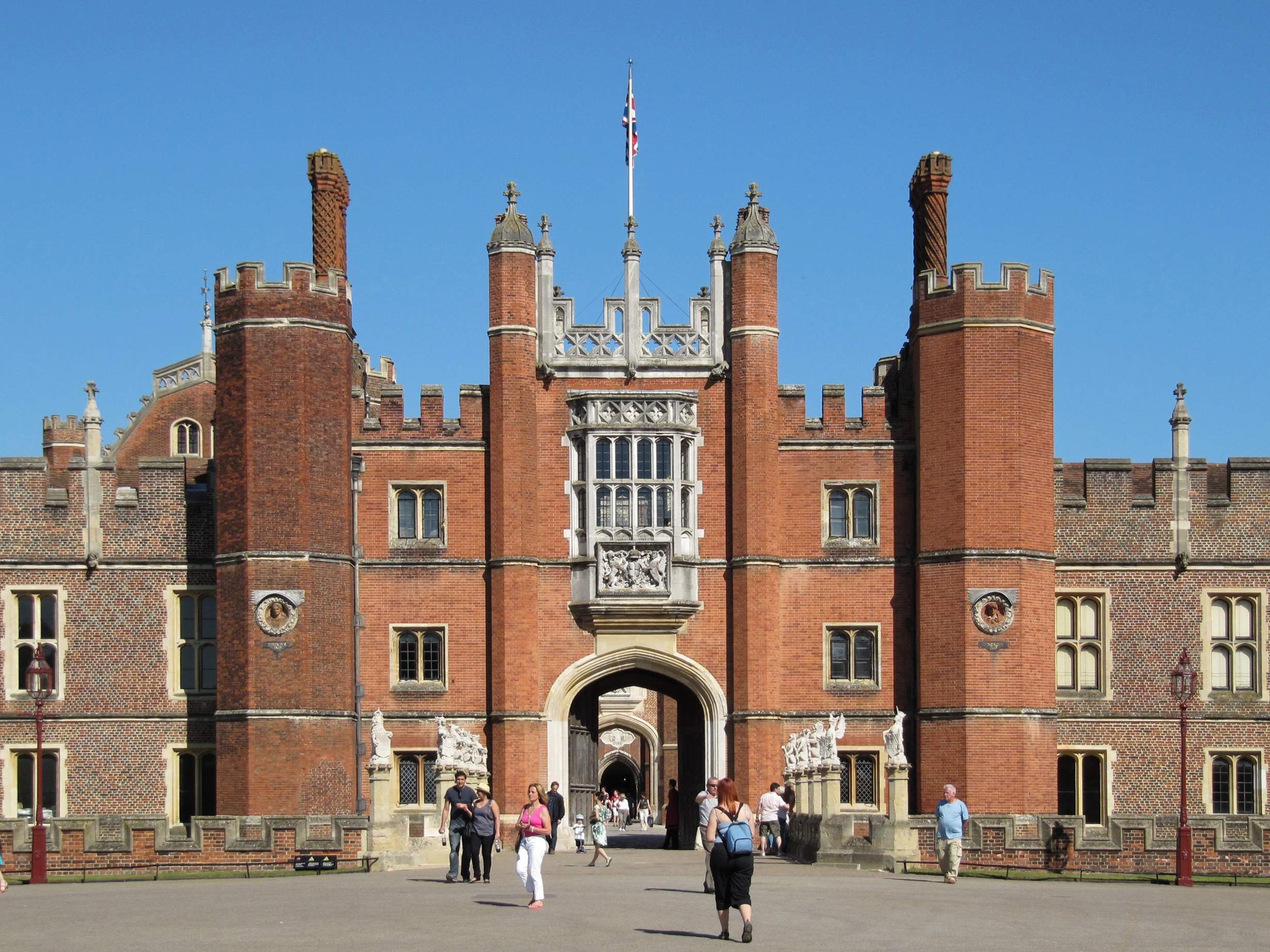
Hampton Court Palace, home of one of the Invalid Corps garrisons

The corps was founded by James II in autumn 1688. Suspected of pro-catholic sympathies, James faced dissent from his nobles and feared an invasion by his protestant nephew and son-in-law, Dutch stadtholder William of Orange. Three companies of invalids were formed from army pensioners and posted to garrisons in Chelsea, Tynemouth and Hampton Court Palace as well as mounting ceremonial guards at the royal palaces. Recruitment proved easier than anticipated and there was no difficulty in providing each company with a Captain, Lieutenant, Ensign, two Sergeants, three Corporals, two Drummers and 50 Privates.

William landed at Brixham on 5 November 1688 and marched on London to depose James II. The invalid companies do not seem to have opposed the invasion despite the fact that William's Dutch Guards marched straight past the gates of the Royal Hospital.

Having been raised on the orders of James II the companies were suspected of being loyal to the deposed king and were disbanded by the new William III – though he allowed them to retain their army pensions. William instructed Lieutenant-General Thomas Tollemache to reinstate the corps in May 1690, forming a company of 2 drummers, 6 sergeants, 10 corporals and 100 privates to supplement the garrison at Windsor Castle. A further 46 men drawn from the hospital joined the unit in 1692, by which time it was commanded by a captain, assisted by two lieutenants and an ensign.

On 1 June 1694 three additional companies were formed to garrison Hampton Court Palace, Tynemouth and Chester. These were composed of 92 officers and men, increased to 168 men of all ranks in September 1698. The Tynemouth unit was posted to Falmouth between 1695 and 1699. The intention seems to have been to free up space at the Royal Hospital Chelsea for casualties from the War of the League of Augsburg and to absorb some of the soldiers from units disbanded following the Treaty of Ryswick.

=== During the reign of Queen Anne ===
In February 1703, during the reign of Queen Anne, the Duke of Marlborough as Commander-in-Chief of the Forces was apparently responsible for reducing each company of the corps to a captain, lieutenant, ensign, 3 sergeants, 2 corporals, a drummer and 75 men. The hospital was also instructed not to fill any vacancies arising in the unit without Marlborough's approval. The surplus men were dismissed from service, initially with only a one-off gratuity of £1 but following a public petition their out-pensions were reinstated.

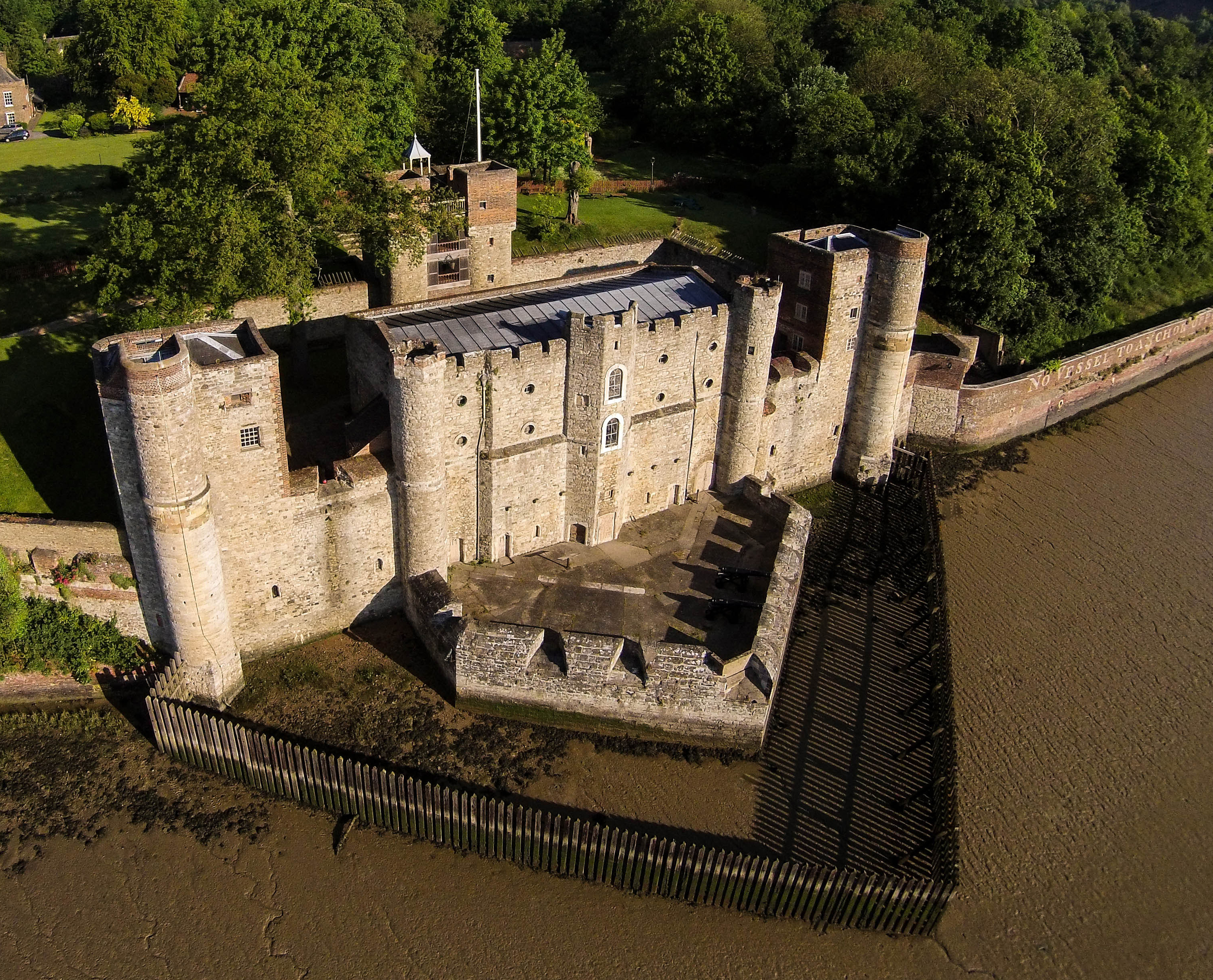
Upnor Castle was garrisoned by men of the corps

The three companies were strengthened again by a reinforcement of 30 men each in December 1703. The Hampton Court company was transferred to Greenwich and became responsible for garrisoning Upnor Castle. This was a particularly hard duty owing to having to post guards in knee-high water in the marshes on the Isle of Grain. In 1704 the corps provided a unit for garrison duty at Kensington Palace, releasing a detachment of 600 Foot Guards for service in Portugal during the War of the Spanish Succession.

In anticipation of a planned French invasion of Scotland under the leadership of James Francis Edward Stuart ("the Old Pretender") six additional companies of invalids were raised for garrison duty at Sheerness, Tilbury Fort, Landguard Fort and Dover. This enabled Brigadier Livesage's Regiment to be released for posting to Scotland. The army found it difficult to find enough retired officers to fill the positions and some Chelsea Hospital staff had to be called upon to serve. The French invasion fleet was prevented from landing troops by a squadron of the Royal Navy under Admiral Byng. Despite this the additional companies were retained and two further companies raised, one for service at Hampton Court Palace in 1709 and one to garrison Upnor Castle in 1710.

George Granville, Secretary for War, ordered an additional 15 companies to be raised in spring 1711. Three were posted to the Tower of London and four were sent to augment the garrison at Portsmouth which had been depleted by sickness and drafts for overseas service in the War of Spanish Succession. The latter four companies were slow to reach the city as insufficient funds had been provided for their travel – they were halted at Brentford for two months being unable to pay their lodging fees. The remaining eight companies had been intended to relieve Lieutenant-General Mordaunt's Regiment for service overseas, however they were never formed owing to the Peace of Utrecht bringing the war to a close. Officers had been provided for these units but they received no pay and many were jailed for debt.

At the end of Anne's reign the corps consisted of four "senior" companies and four "junior" companies. The former were posted to Windsor Castle, Hampton Court Palace, Chester and Tynemouth and the latter to Hampton Court Palace, Greenwich, Tilbury, Tilbury Fort, Upnor Castle, Sheerness, Dover and Landguard Fort.

=== During the reign of George I ===
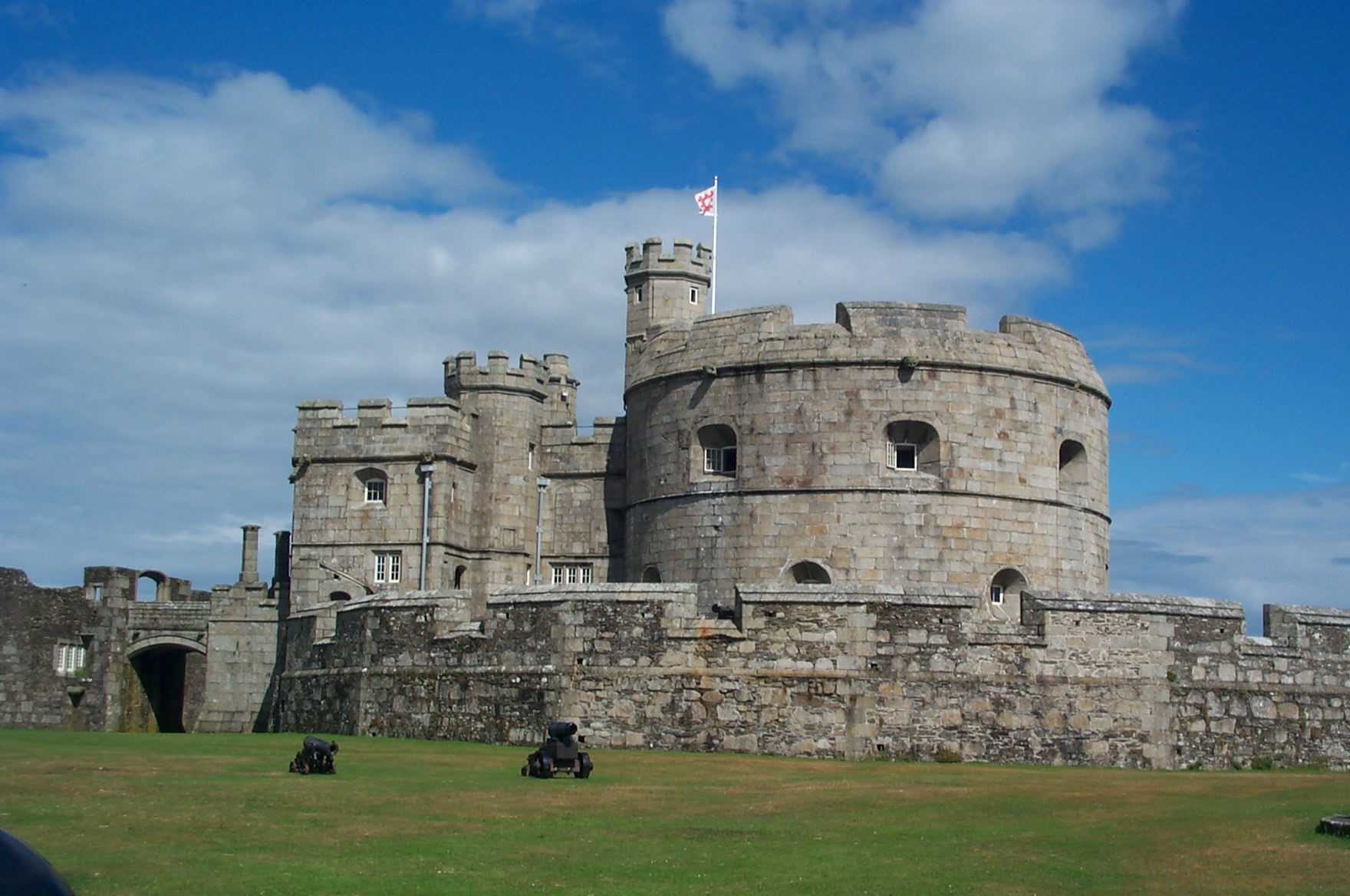
Pendennis Castle was garrisoned by the corps during the Jacobite rising of 1715

After the death of Queen Anne her second cousin and the new king George I of Hanover, feared a fresh Jacobite invasion. To supplement the nation's defences 1,200 out-pensioners were called into the Invalid Corps, with 108 going to the garrison at Greenwich and 600 to Portsmouth. Following the start of the 1715 Jacobite Uprising in Scotland 12 additional companies of invalids were raised on 2 August for garrison duty at Portsmouth. A further four companies were raised on 13 August – two for duty at Plymouth and one each for Falmouth and Pendennis Castle. As a means of ensuring loyalty the rate of pay of the invalids was raised to be on par with that of the line infantry. The new companies comprised a captain, a lieutenant, an ensign, two sergeants, two corporals, one drummer and fifty privates.

The invalid companies at Plymouth appear to have been successful in deterring a planned landing by the Duke of Ormonde, who had hoped to raise forces sympathetic to the Stuarts in the West Country in September. A large expansion of the Invalid Corps was carried out in 1719 which included the founding of Edmund Fielding's Regiment.

=== Later history and dissolution ===
The Invalid Corps was employed on garrison duty throughout the remainder of the 18th century. Additional companies were raised throughout this period to meet the requirement to release troops for foreign service in the Seven Years' War, American War of Independence and the French Revolutionary Wars. New companies were embodied in 1712, 1719, 1740, 1741, 1756, 1762–1764, 1775, 1783–1784 and 1792–1793. A further detachment of 500 invalids was made available for service at sea in 1740, however Commodore George Anson was shocked at the disability and age of the men supplied. In 1791 the corps numbered 7,175 men.

The corps was disbanded in 1802. Those who were fit for service were enrolled into the newly formed Royal Garrison Battalions (renamed Royal Veteran Battalions from 1804). These comprised seven battalions of ten companies each (600–1000 men per battalion), with a further six battalions raised in the course of the Napoleonic Wars. All of the battalions were disbanded or incorporated into regular line regiments in 1814–1815.

== See also ==
- Veteran Reserve Corps
