= New Grimsby =

Human settlement in Cornwall, England

Coordinates: 49.955°N 6.338°W

New Grimsby: Cornish: Enysgrymm Nowyth
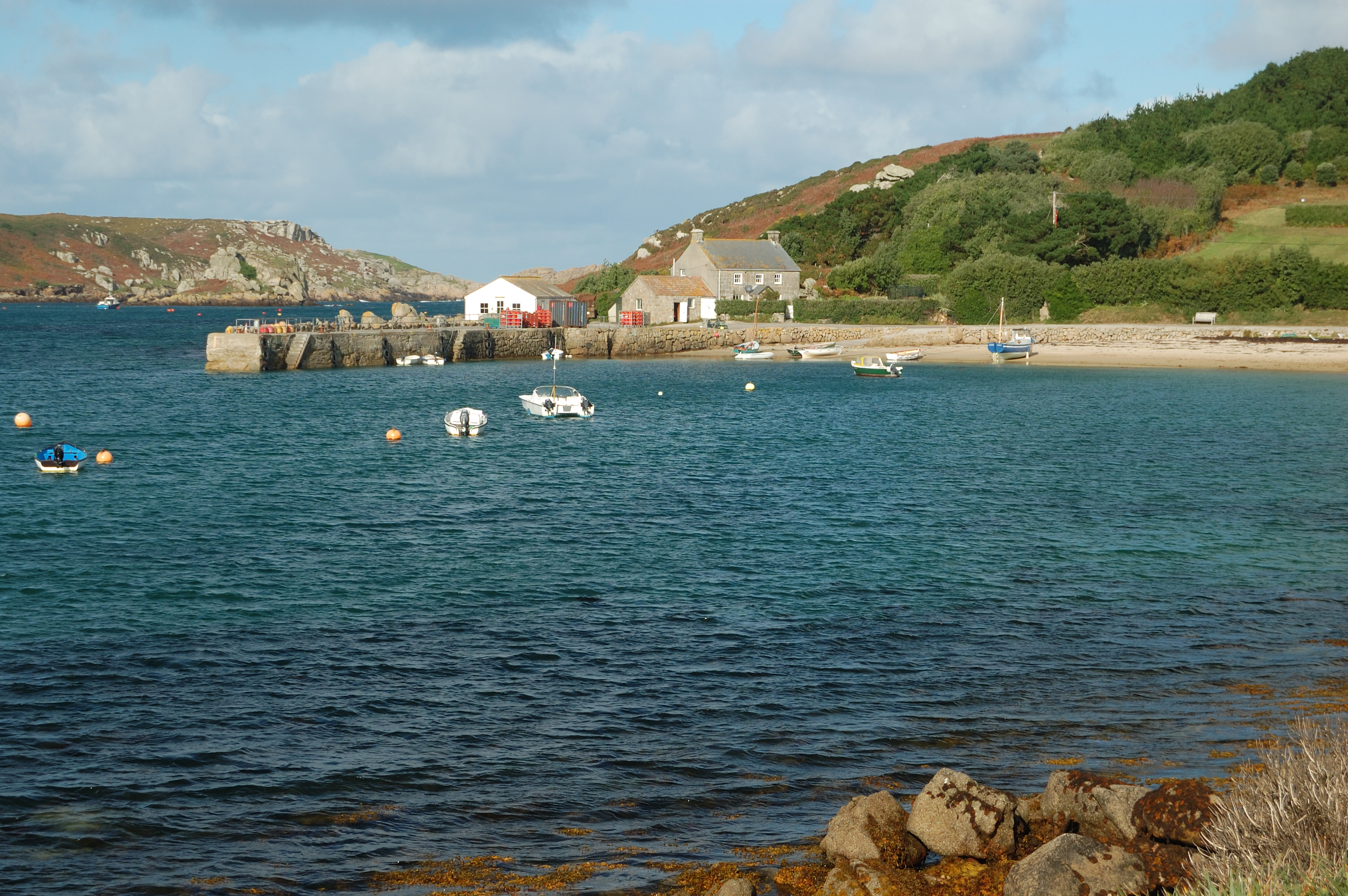
- The quay at New Grimsby

- Location within Isles of Scilly
- Civil parish: Tresco
- Unitary authority: Isles of Scilly
- Ceremonial county: Cornwall
- Region: South West
- Country: England
- Sovereign state: United Kingdom
- Post town: ISLES OF SCILLY
- Postcode district: TR24
- Dialling code: 01720
- Police: Devon and Cornwall
- Fire: Isles of Scilly
- Ambulance: South Western
- UK Parliament: St Ives

New Grimsby (Cornish: Enysgrymm Nowyth) is a coastal settlement on the island of Tresco in the Isles of Scilly, England. It is located on the west side of the island and there is a quay, as well as a public house, The New Inn, and a small art gallery.

The southern portion of the modern-day settlement (on the site of Abbey Farm) has greatly expanded in recent years and is now the centre of the island's timeshare holiday community, which includes the Tresco Estate's "Island Office", the island's convenience store (with a post office sub-branch inside) and a restaurant.

Tresco's other main settlement is Old Grimsby, located to the northeast of New Grimsby, on the east coast of the island.

== Education ==
The government school for the Isles of Scilly is Five Islands Academy. There is a primary campus in Tresco, while secondary students go to St Mary's.
