= Allan Marshall Brodie =

British historian and architectural historian

Allan Brodie FSA FRHistS is a British historian and architectural historian. His expertise includes medieval ecclesiastical architecture and the history of tourism in Britain. He studied for his MA at the Courtauld Institute of Art, University of London in 1982, the subject of his dissertation being the chronology of the East End of Rochester Cathedral. Photographs contributed by Allan Brodie to the Courtauld's Conway Library archive are currently being digitised as part of the Courtauld Connects project. In 2021 he completed his Ph.D. (by published work) at the University of Westminster on The Urban Character of the Early English Seaside Resort 1700–1847. The award was based on a new commentary, seven published papers and two books.

== Career ==
Allan Brodie worked for Historic England, where he was an architectural investigator in the Partnerships Team (South West). He researches historical buildings including a Roman fort, medieval churches, castles, Georgian prisons and even an Art Deco airport terminal. Brodie's writing also covers topics related to seaside resorts and ports development, including the Georgian sex life of Scarborough, Liverpool's history of sea bathing and a typology of seaside resorts origins, and the phenomenon of Kent resort towns.

Brodie co-edited the collection Travel and Tourism in Britain 1700–1914 with Susan Barton, which reveals 'a transition from travel as a "difficult, dangerous and expensive, but perhaps exotic" pastime to a somewhat more commonplace one'.

Brodie co-authored the book Weston-super-Mare: The town and its seaside heritage (2019), with Johanna Roethe and Kate Hudson-McAulay. The book was launched at the Blakehay Theatre in 2019 in an event hosted by the chair of Historic England, Sir Laurie Magnus.

Allan Brodie was educated at Aboyne Primary School and Aboyne Academy. After a MA (Hons) degree at Aberdeen University, he attended the Courtauld Institute of Art, University of London.

From January 1986 to March 1999 Brodie was Senior Architectural Investigator for the Royal Commission on the Historical Monuments of England.

From 1999 Allan Brodie has served as a Senior Investigator at English Heritage and since 2015 Historic England. Brodie co-authored the Historic England book Defending Scilly, regarding the military defences of the Isles of Scilly and the threat of climate change (2011). He has written, or co-authored, widely on seaside resorts, including works on Margate, Weymouth, Blackpool and Weston-super-Mare. He co-authored a book on seaside resorts in 2007 and wrote books on The Seafront and Tourism and the Changing Face of the British Isles (2019). In 2021 he published a book on England's Seaside Heritage from the Air. He has also published England's Military Heritage from the Air with Mark Bowden in 2024 and England's Lost Transport Heritage from the Air in 2025.

After leaving Historic England in 2022, Allan Brodie is now a Visiting Fellow at Bournemouth University working with the Tourism Management team. He is now also lecturing on a variety of subjects to audiences around the country and at sea.

== Professional recognition ==
Brodie was elected a Fellow the Society of Antiquaries of London on 7 July 2009. He was elected as a Fellow of the Royal Historical Society in 2020.

== Books ==
- Brodie, Allan. England's Lost Transport Heritage from the Air. Liverpool: Liverpool University Press, 2025 ISBN 978-1-83624-451-6
- Bowden, Mark, and Brodie, Allan, England's Military Heritage from the Air. Liverpool: Liverpool University Press, 2024 ISBN 9781835536957
- Brodie, Allan. England's Seaside Heritage from the Air. Liverpool: Liverpool University Press, 2021 ISBN 9781800859647
- Brodie, Allan. Tourism and the Changing Face of the British Isles. Swindon: Historic England, 2019 ISBN 1848023588
- Brodie, Allan. The Seafront. Swindon: Historic England, 2018 ISBN 1848023820 ISBN 978-1848023826
- Brodie, Allan, Roethe Johanna, Hudson-McAulay Kate. Weston Super-Mare: The Town and its Seaside Heritage. Swindon: Historic England, 2019 ISBN 1848024797 ISBN 978-1848024793
- Brodie, Allan & Whitfield, Matthew. Blackpool's Seaside Heritage. Swindon: English Heritage, 2014 ISBN 1848021100 ISBN 978-1848021105
- Bowden, Mark & Brodie, Allan. Defending Scilly. Swindon: English Heritage, 2011 ISBN 1848020430 ISBN 978-1848020436
- Brodie, Allan; Ellis Colin, Stuart, David & Winter, Gary. Weymouth's Seaside Heritage, Swindon: English Heritage, 2008 ISBN 1848020082 ISBN 978-1848020085
- Brodie, Allan & Winter Gary. England's Seaside Resorts. Swindon : English Heritage 2007 ISBN 1905624654 ISBN 9781905624652
- Barker, Nigel; Brodie, Allan; Dermott, Nick; Jessop, Lucy & Winter, Gary. Margate's Seaside Heritage. Swindon: English Heritage, 2007 ISBN 1905624662 ISBN 978-1905624669
- Brodie, Allan; Sargent, Andrew & Winter, Gary. Seaside Holidays in the Past: London : English Heritage, 2005. ASIN B01K0USWKO
- Brodie, Allan; Croom, Jane & Davies, James O. English Prisons -an Architectural History, Swindon: English Heritage, 2002 ISBN 1873592531 ISBN 978-1873592533
- Brodie, Allan; Croom, Jane & Davies, James O. Behind Bars: The Hidden Architecture of England's Prisons. Swindon: Royal Commission on Historical Monuments, 27 Jan. 2000 ISBN 1873592396 ISBN 978-1873592397
