= Star Castle, Isles of Scilly =

Star Castle
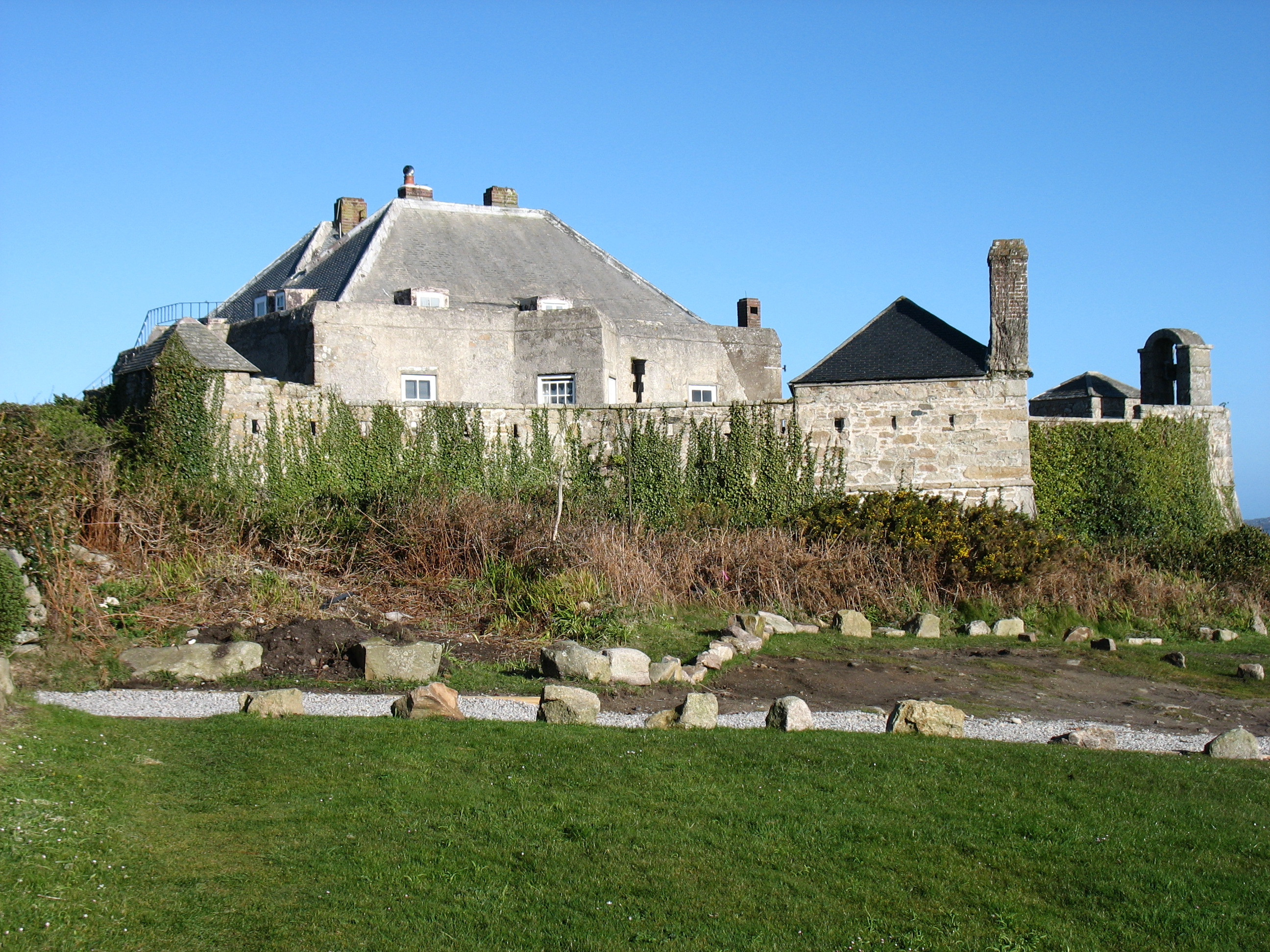

- Location within Isles of Scilly
- 49.915378°N 6.321056°W
- Type: Fortress
- Location: St Mary's, Isles of Scilly

History
- Built: 1593

Site notes
- Architect: Robert Adams
- Architectural style: Military architecture
- Governing body: Privately owned

Listed Building – Grade I
- Official name: Star Castle Hotel
- Designated: 12 February 1975
- Reference no.: 1291756

Listed Building – Grade I
- Official name: Bastions and Walls of Star Castle
- Designated: 12 February 1975
- Reference no.: 1141188

Listed Building – Grade I
- Official name: Powder Magazine and Blast Walls
- Designated: 14 December 1982
- Reference no.: 1141187

Listed Building – Grade I
- Official name: Outer Walls and Gateway
- Designated: 14 December 1982
- Reference no.: 1291751

Listed Building – Grade II*
- Official name: Gatehouse Cottage
- Designated: 12 February 1975
- Reference no.: 1218853

Star Castle is a fortress on St Mary's, Isles of Scilly, built in 1593 by Robert Adams, Surveyor of the Royal Works (d.1595) and Francis Godolphin, Captain of the Scilly Isles, during the "Spanish invasion scare."

== History ==
The Star Castle was built in 1593 by the Surveyor of the Royal Works and mapmaker Robert Adams, under the direction of Francis Godolphin, Captain of the Scilly Isles, following the Spanish Armada of 1588. Fearing another Spanish invasion, in May 1593 Queen Elizabeth I ordered the construction of a fort and two sconces as a lookout for any intruder ships.

In 1740 Master Gunner Abraham Tovey transformed the Garrison building walls with gun batteries, including Colonel Boscawen's Battery, in a circular shape following the coast line of The Hoe. In the 18th century it was garrisoned by troops from the Corps of Invalids.

Star Castle is now a hotel.

== Description ==
The Star Castle is in the shape of an eight-pointed star and features on the flag of the Council of the Isles of Scilly. It is at the centre of a fortification system around the west side of St Mary’s known as the Garrison. It comprises an outer wall around the outcrop of Hew Hill, protecting the town and the castle, with strategically placed gun batteries at regular intervals around the outer wall, allowing covering fire at all angles.

Star Castle is a Grade I listed building. Three other structures within the fort complex are listed at Grade I, the highest grade, comprising the totality of the Grade I listed buildings on the Isles of Scilly: the bastions and walls to the castle; the powder magazine, and the outer walls.

== Gallery ==
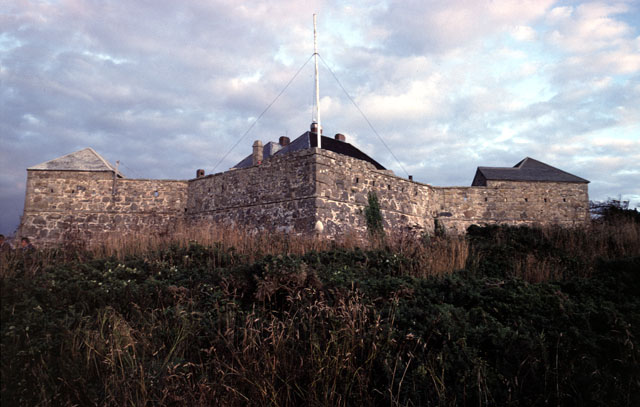
Bastions

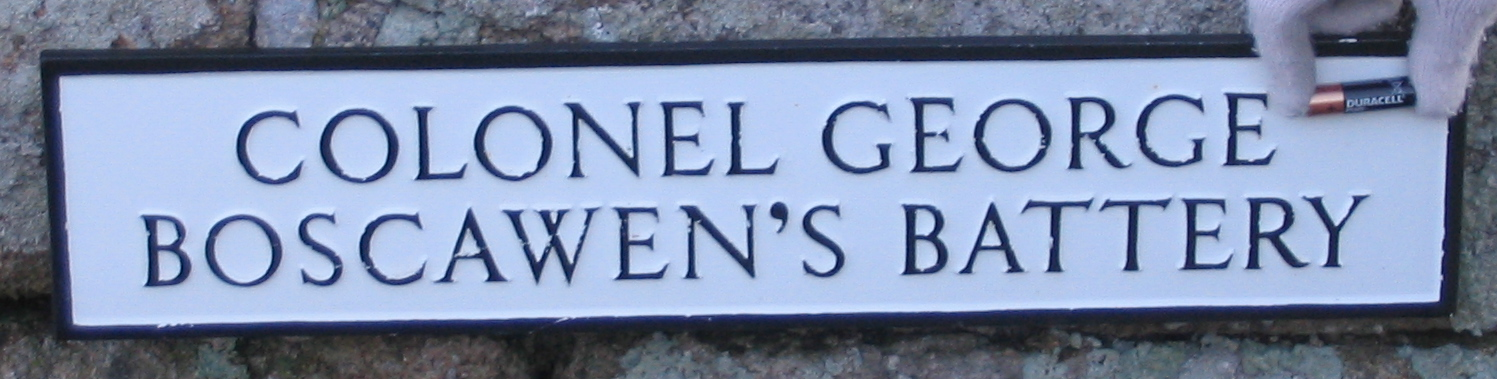
Name plate on Colonel George Boscawen's Battery
