= St Mary's Church, St Mary's =

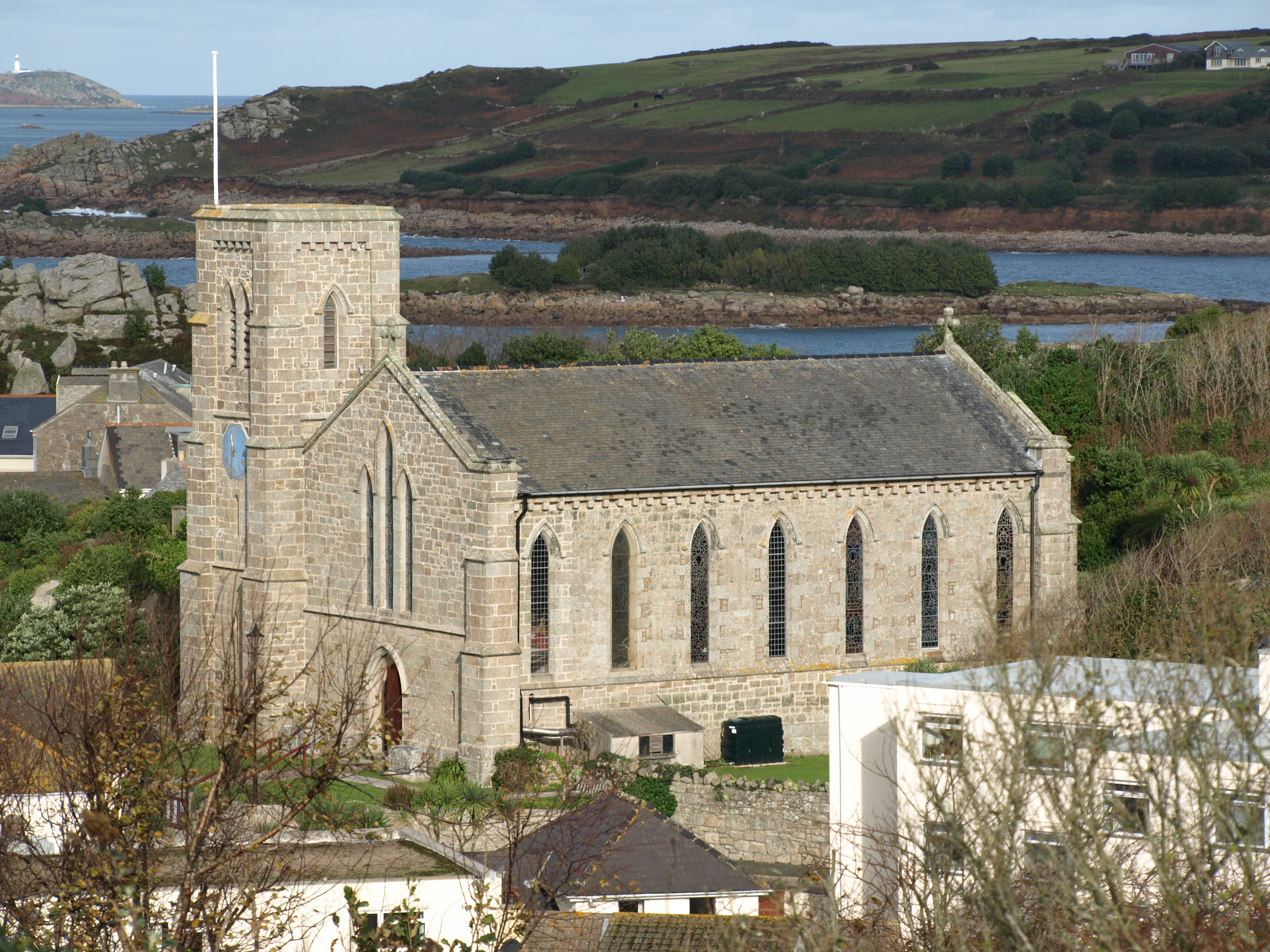
- St Mary's Church, Hugh Town, St Mary's
- St Mary's Church, St Mary's
- 49°54′56″N 06°18′38″W
- OS grid reference: SV906106
- Location: St Mary's, Isles of Scilly
- Country: England
- Denomination: Church of England
- Churchmanship: Broad Church
- Website: https://www.ioschurches.co.uk/

History
- Dedication: Blessed Virgin Mary

Architecture
- Heritage designation: Grade II listed

Specifications
- Length: 100 feet (30 m)
- Width: 45 feet (14 m)

Administration
- Province: Canterbury
- Diocese: Truro
- Deanery: Powder
- Parish: St Mary's, Isles of Scilly

Clergy
- Vicar: Canon Paul Miller

St Mary's Church, St Mary's is a parish church in the Church of England located in Hugh Town, St Mary's, Isles of Scilly, UK. The Church was consecrated on 7 September 1838 and replaced the church at Old Town which was inconvenient for the Hugh Town population and in need of repair.

== History ==
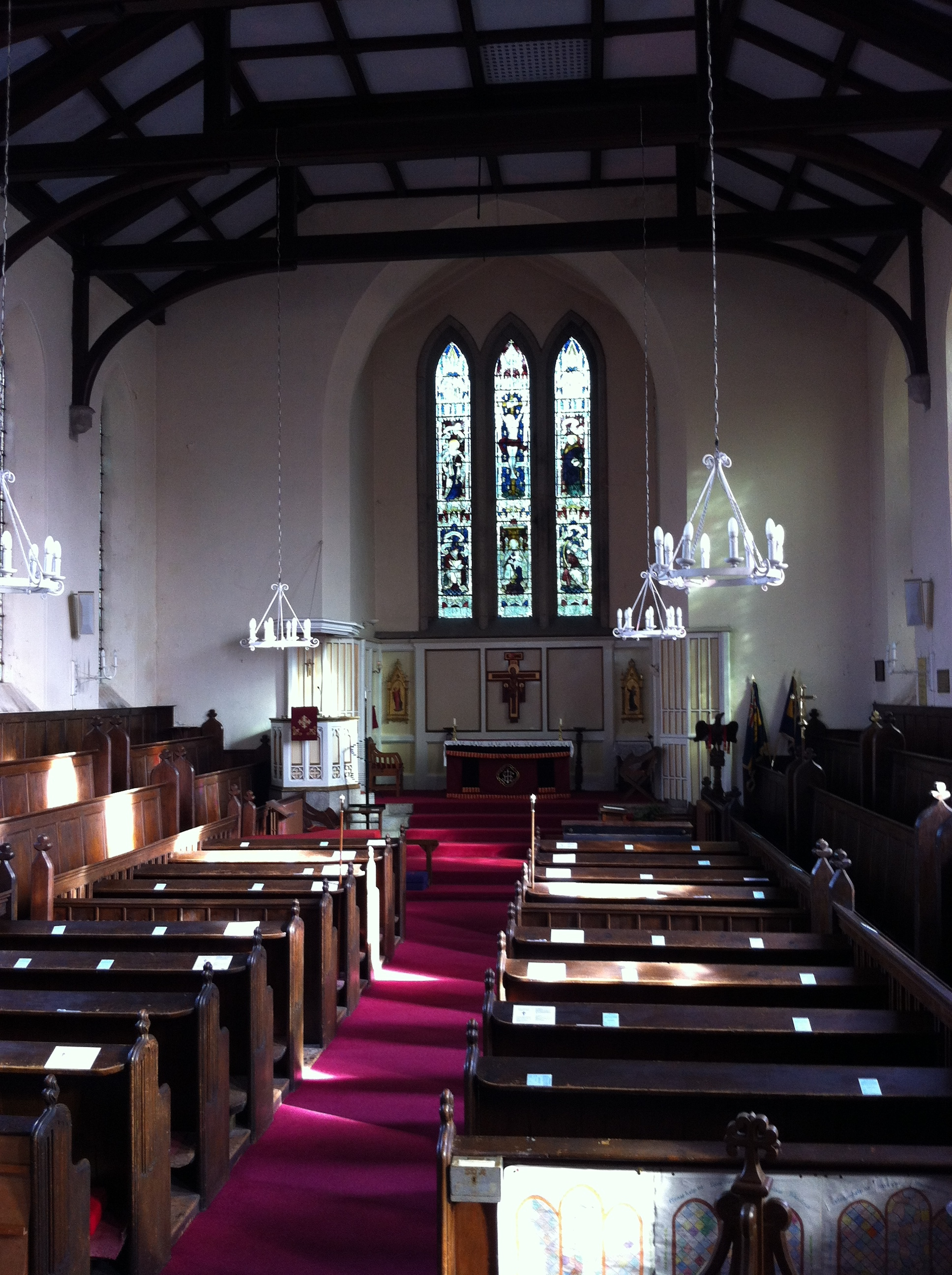
Nave and chancel

Augustus Smith although not an architect designed the church and according to a letter, penned by himself to the secretary of the Duchy of Cornwall was very pleased with his architectural skill. Smith laid the foundation stone on 31 October 1836, on a site at the eastern end of Hugh Town on high ground between Carn Thomas and Buzza Hill. Vyvyan (1960) describes the building as ° ... bold rather than pleasing, plain rather than ornate, characteristics which mark the interior also″. King William IV granted £1,500 towards its erection, it was completed in August 1838 and was consecrated on 7 September 1838. The proposed inscription for the church, according to a memorandum in Smith's handwriting was to be ″This Church was erected by the munificence of His Majesty, King William the Fourth, a lasting memorial of his zeal and of his paternal regard for the inhabitants of these Islands.° It actually reads ″In the year of our Lord, 1837, this Church was erected by the munificence of His Majesty King William IV. The same was completed at the expense of Augustus Smith, Esq″.

The interior contains the coloured and gilded wooden lion from the flagship of Sir Cloudesley Shovell, wrecked in 1707. Outside the church are two lead water cisterns, with heraldic plaques and cartouches set in strapwork panels, dating from 1727 and brought here from Star Castle. The church was repaired by Corfield (C. Russell and Son), Architects of Falmouth between 1979 and 1980.

== Stained glass ==
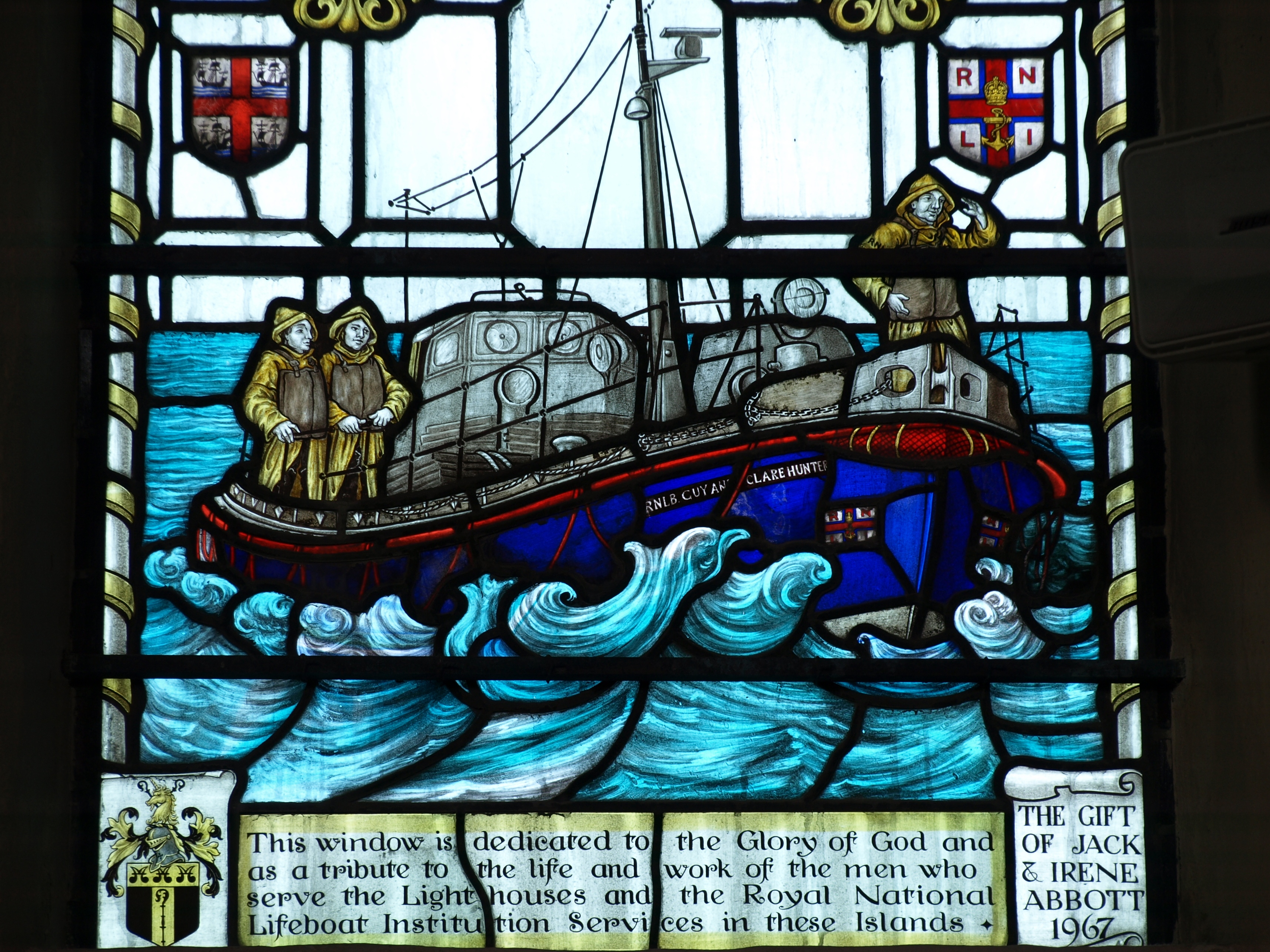
Detail of window by Alfred Wilkinson from 1967

The east window dates from 1899 and is by Charles Eamer Kempe. The west window dates from 1937 and was designed by Arthur Lucien Ward. Two north windows by Alfred Wilkinson were added in 1967.

== Bells ==
The peal of eight bells were cast together at Whitechapel Bell Foundry to a Gillett & Johnston 1922 profile in 2008. The bell frame was constructed and bells hung by Nicholson Engineering of Bridport 2009. The dedication of the eight new bells, clock and chimes was by the Bishop of Truro Timothy Martin Thornton, on his first visit to the Islands. This was on 21 May 2009.

== Organ ==
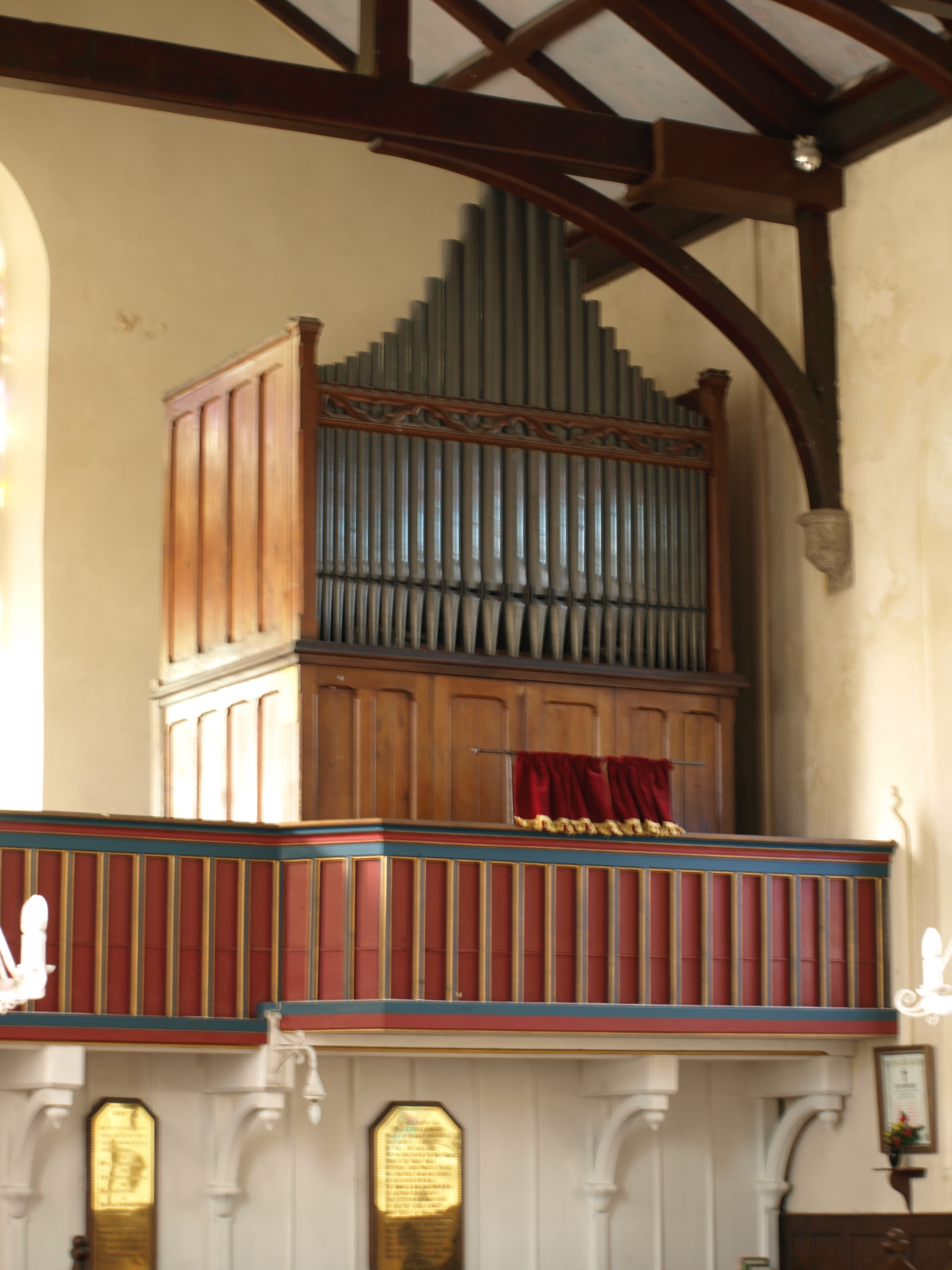
Organ

The church pipe organ is by Willis and dates from 1866. A specification of the organ can be found on the National Pipe Organ Register.

== Parish structure ==
St Mary's Church is within the United Benefice of the Isles of Scilly parishes, comprising

- All Saints' Church, Bryher
- St Agnes' Church, St Agnes
- St Martin's Church, St Martin's
- St Mary's Old Church, St Mary's
- St Nicholas's Church, Tresco
