= St Agnes, Isles of Scilly =

Island in the Isles of Scilly, UK

Coordinates: 49.891°N 6.343°W

St. Agnes: Cornish: Agenys
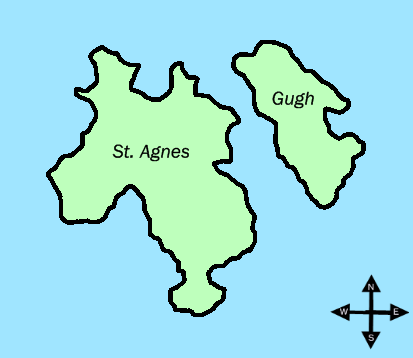
- A map of St. Agnes, with Gugh to the east

- Location within Isles of Scilly
- Population: 82 (2011)
- OS grid reference: SV881430
- Civil parish: St Agnes
- Unitary authority: Isles of Scilly
- Ceremonial county: Cornwall
- Region: South West
- Country: England
- Sovereign state: United Kingdom
- Post town: ISLES OF SCILLY
- Postcode district: TR22
- Dialling code: 01720
- Police: Devon and Cornwall
- Fire: Isles of Scilly
- Ambulance: South Western
- UK Parliament: St Ives

St Agnes (Cornish: Agenys) is the southernmost populated island of the Isles of Scilly. Thus the island's Troy Town Farm is the southernmost settlement in the United Kingdom.

== Description ==
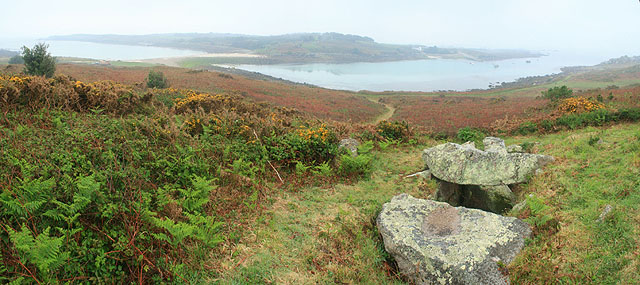
The sandbar from St. Agnes to Gugh

St Agnes joins the island of Gugh by a tombolo, a kind of sandbar, called the Gugh Bar, which is exposed only at low tide. The Gugh is inhabited, with some three residents. The two islands of St Agnes and Gugh together have a population of 85 residents recorded in the 2011 census (73 were recorded in the 2001 census) and a landmass of 366 acres (148 ha). Without the Gugh included, St Agnes is marginally smaller than Bryher in both population and area; however if Gugh is included with St Agnes, it is Bryher that is marginally smaller in area and population.

In earlier times many men from St Agnes earned a living as pilots, guiding transatlantic liners and other vessels through the English Channel. Now the mainstay of the economy is tourism, together with some bulb farming. Accommodation is limited, and St Agnes is the only populated island in the Isles of Scilly which has no hotel. However, it has a few B&Bs and self-catering cottages, an ice cream shop, a campsite, a small post office and general store and a gift shop. It also has a pub (the Turk's Head) and a cafe, although these are closed in the winter.

=== Settlements ===
The main population centre is in the north and middle of the island. The southern part of the island is covered by the heather moorland of Wingletang Down.

The settlements are Troy Town (far west), Lower Town (west), Middle Town (central) and Higher Town (east).

=== Lighthouse ===
The island's most notable landmark is its lighthouse, which has been converted into living accommodation as the tower no longer contains a light.

=== Other landmarks ===
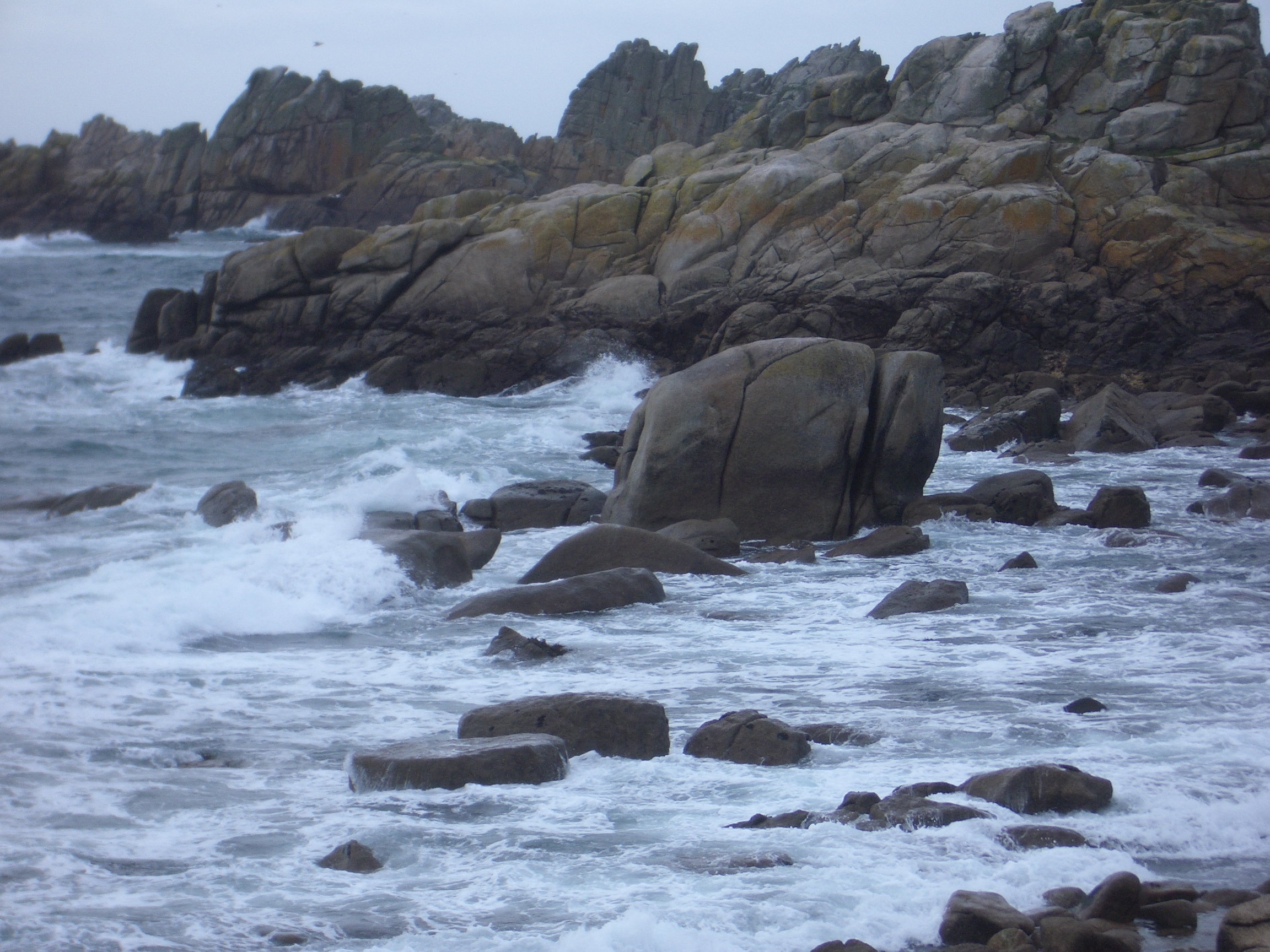
A rock formation on the southwest side of St. Agnes that looks like an elephant

Other landmarks include a standing stone known as the Nag's Head (probably a natural formation). In 1707, many of the sailors who had drowned in the great naval disaster off the Isles of Scilly were reputedly buried on the St Agnes playing field.

Troy Town maze

The Troy Town Maze is said to have been laid out by the son of the lighthouse keeper in 1729, but may be much older. Although called a maze it is strictly a labyrinth with a convoluted path to the centre via seven rings. It is the only one outside Scandinavia made of beach pebbles, which may indicate it to be of Viking origin. References in the Norse sagas tell of raiders coming to Scilly as late as the mid-12th century. Any buried evidence of its origins may have been destroyed during an unofficial rebuild in 1988.

== Churches ==
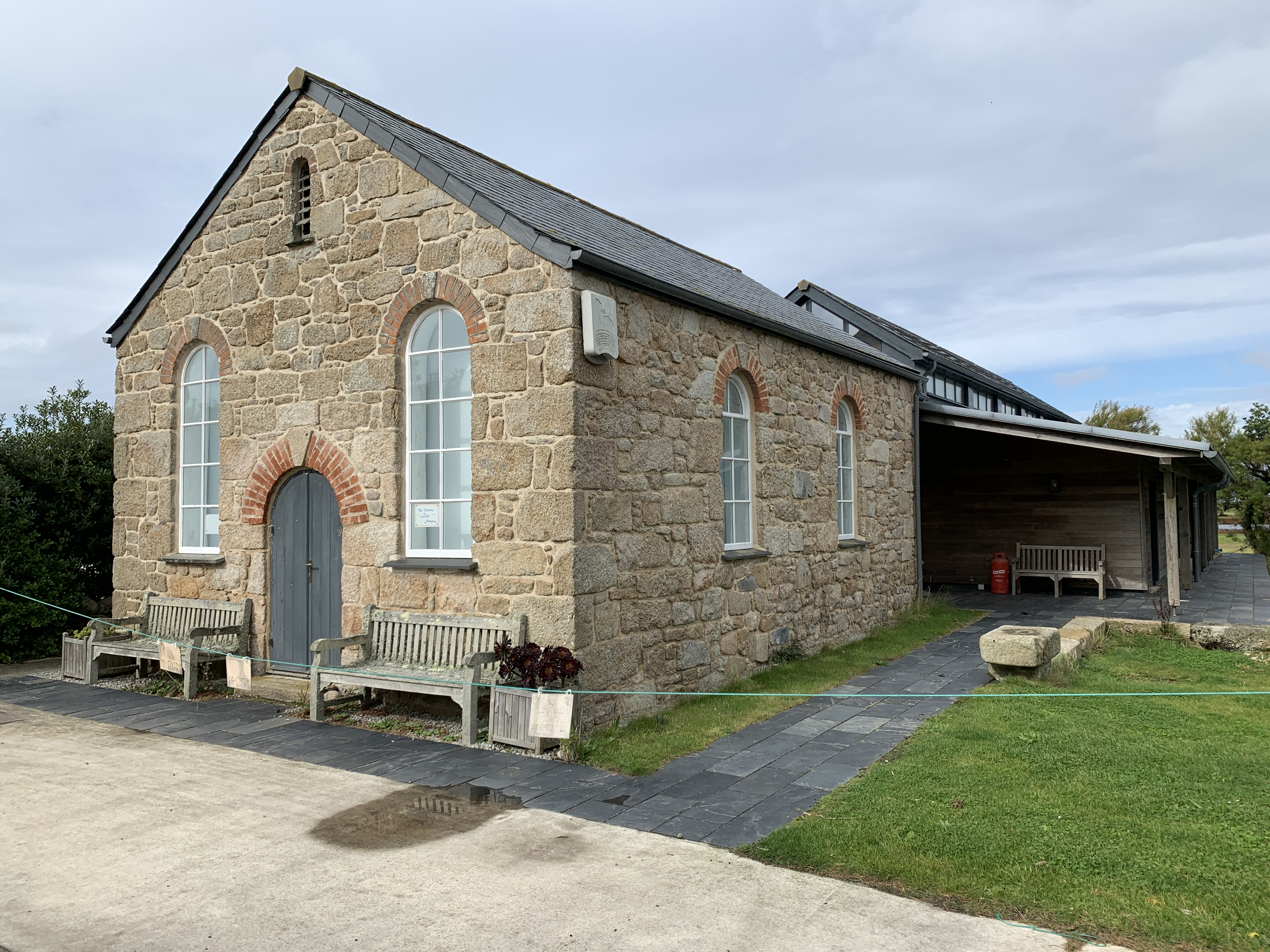
Bible Christian chapel

The primary church of St Agnes is St Agnes' parish church, but the Bible Christians maintained a congregation on the island for over 100 years and built the Bible Christian Chapel, St Agnes in the north of the island in 1874.

St Agnes' Church is a parish church in the Church of England located in the village, dedicated to St Agnes of Rome. The first church was built in the sixteenth or seventeenth century, but it was destroyed in a gale. It was rebuilt in the eighteenth century, but was again destroyed. The current building was built by the islanders in the nineteenth century using the proceeds of the sale of a wreck, and the bell in the church was taken from that wreck. It is a Grade II listed building. In 1821, the church was surveyed by Barnard Sherris of the Incorporated Church Building Society, and a grant was approved for a new west gallery and two new pews in the chancel. The church features stained-glass windows locally made by artists Marigold and Oriel Hicks. St Agnes' Church is within the United Benefice of the Isles of Scilly parishes, which also includes All Saints' Church, Bryher, St Martin's Church, St Martin's, St Mary's Church, St Mary's, St Mary's Old Church, St Mary's, and St Nicholas's Church, Tresco.

St Agnes' parish church

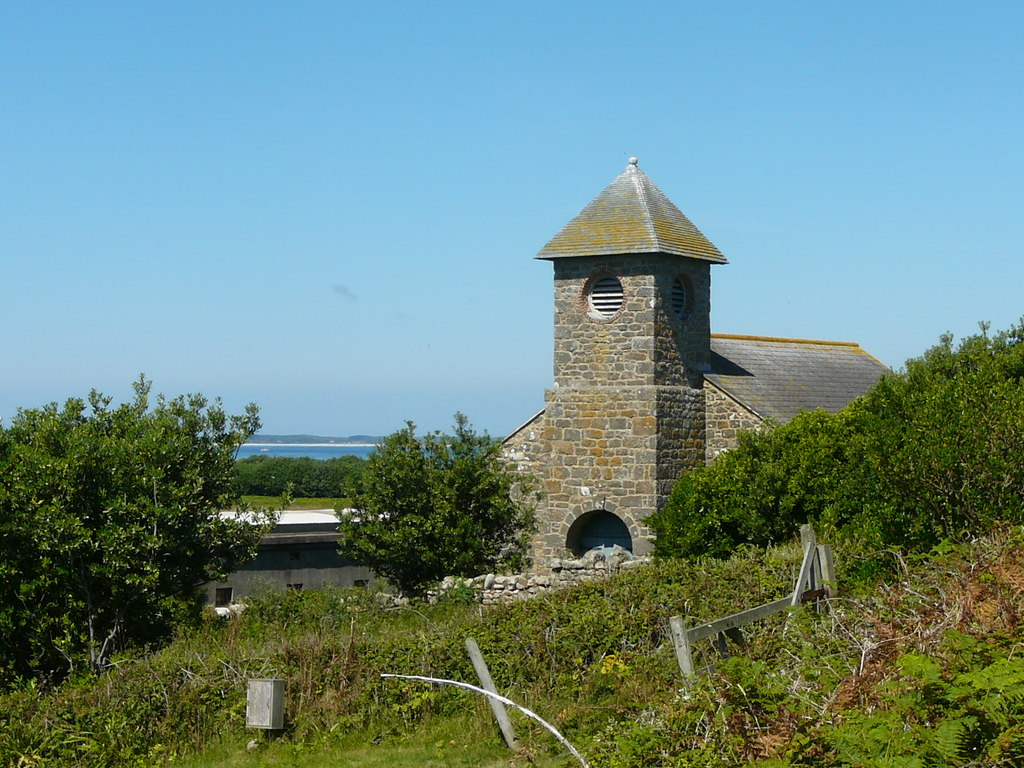

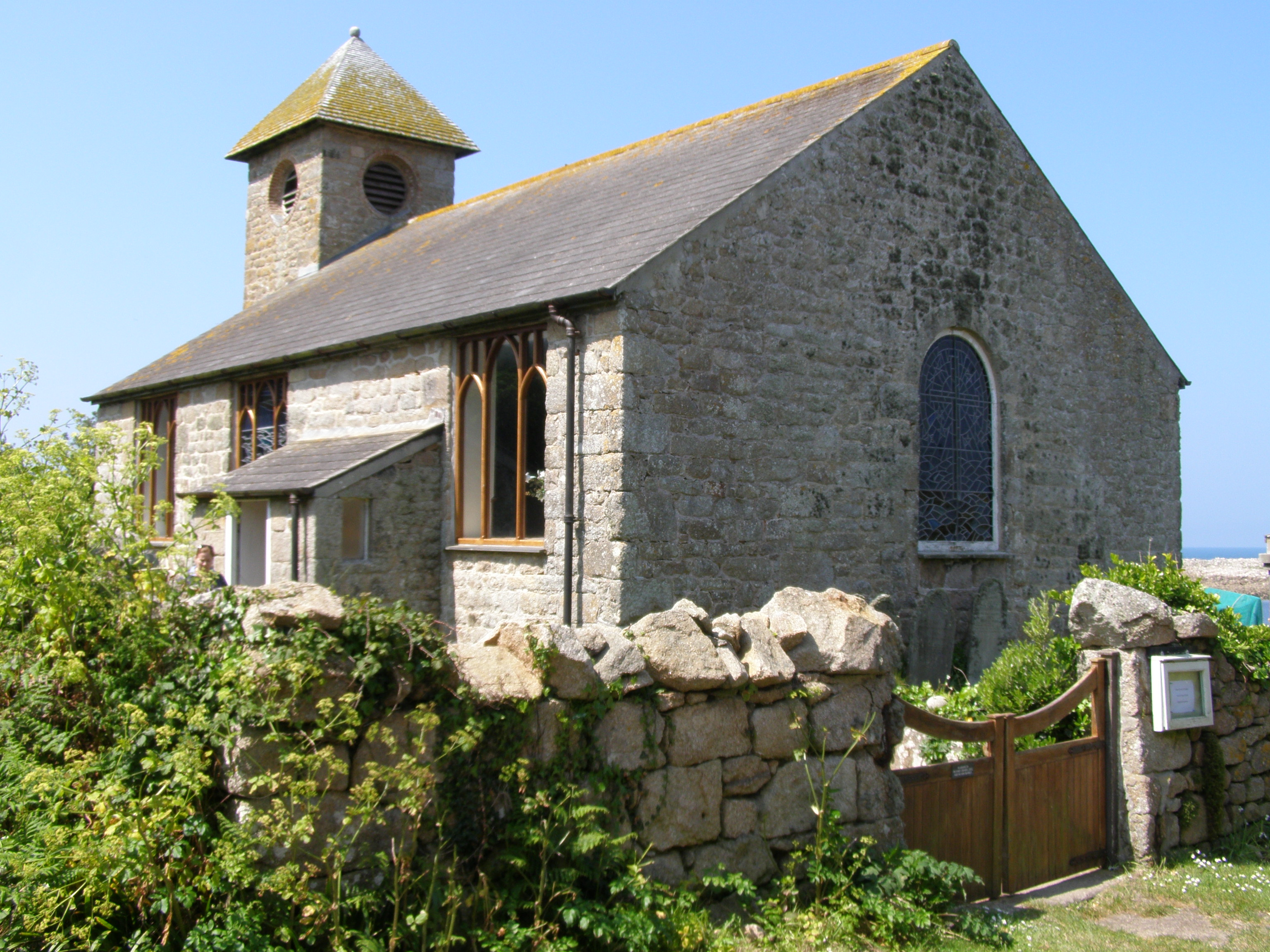

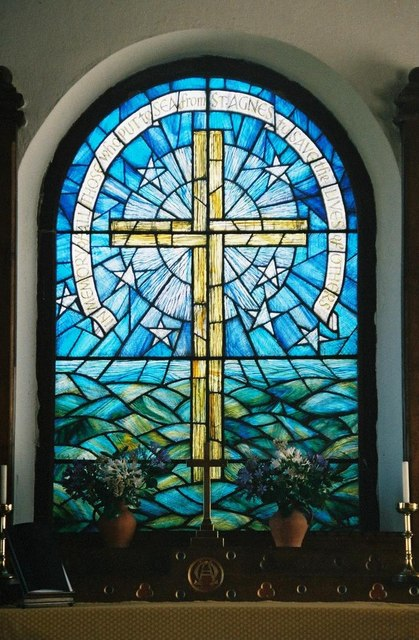

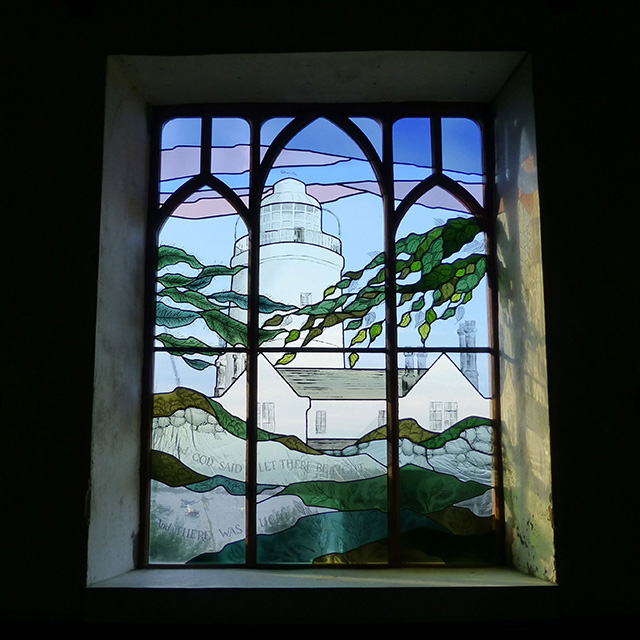

== Population ==
Population
City	Population
1841	243
1861	200
1871	179
1878	150( (Note: estimated to be nearly 150 in 25 households; the heads of 17 of these were surnamed Hicks (still a common surname on the island)))
1881	148
1891	130
1901	134
1911	102
1921	101
1931	78
1951	78
1961	85
1971	63
1981	80
1991	90
2001	73
2011	85

== Sporting and social life ==
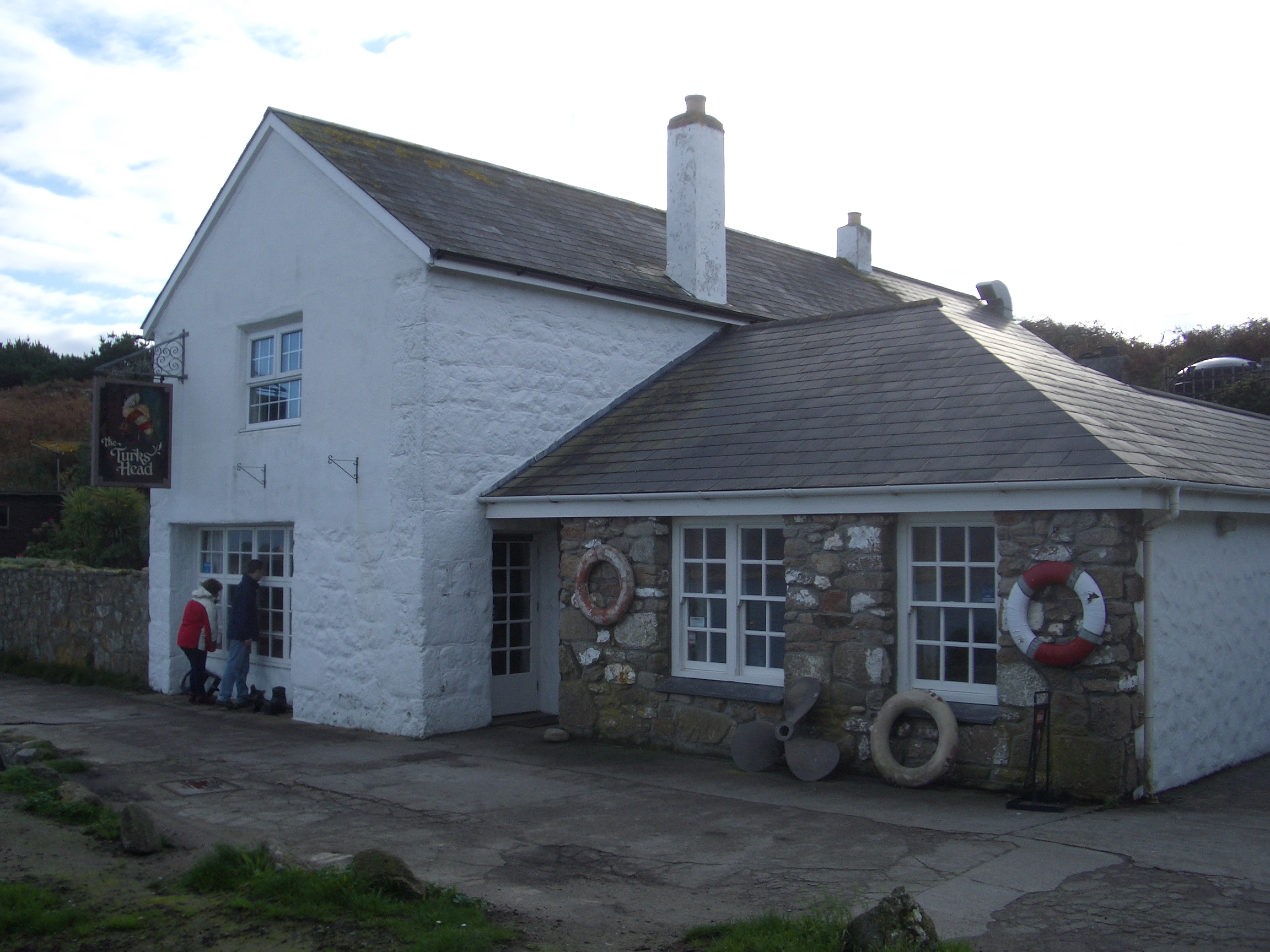
The Turk's Head, the only pub on St. Agnes

Friday evenings in the summer (end of April until start of October) see men's domestic Cornish Pilot Gig racing on Scilly, with the ladies' race on Wednesday. After the race, supporters fill the Turk's Head to discuss the race and to socialise. The pub is open through the summer, but during the winter it only opens on Wednesdays for a pub quiz, and one other night.

== Notable residents ==
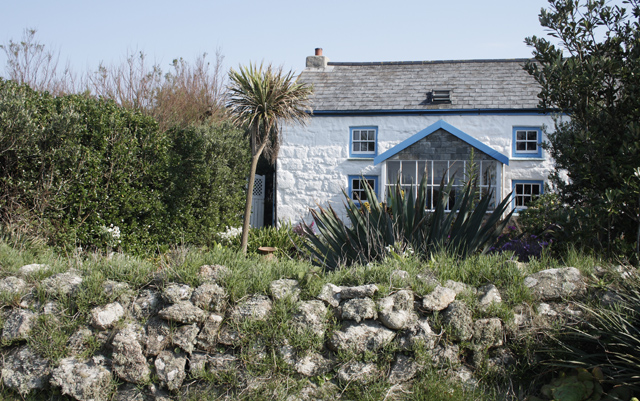
Periglis Cottage, home of Hilda M. Quick

Periglis Cottage was the home of St Agnes's resident ornithologist Hilda M. Quick. She was the author of Birds of the Scilly Isles published in 1964.

== Education ==
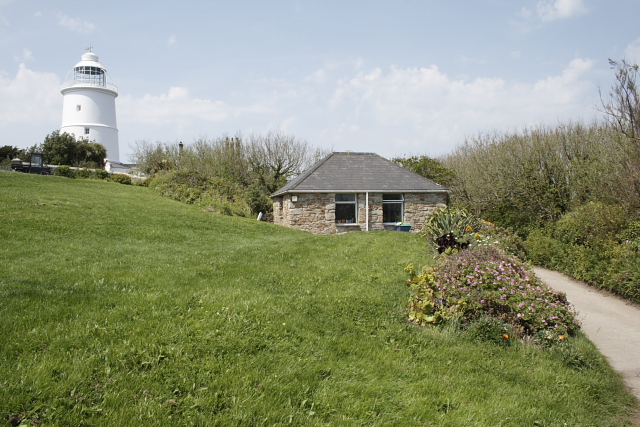
St Agnes Base

Five Islands Academy (previously Five Islands School) has its St Agnes Base, a primary campus. Secondary pupils board at the St Mary's main campus, staying there on weekdays and coming back and forth to their home islands on weekends.

Students at the sixth-form college level reside and board elsewhere, in mainland Great Britain. Previously the Learning and Skills Council paid for costs of accommodation for sixth-formers.

== Natural history ==
Over one third of the area of St Agnes is designated as Sites of Special Scientific Interest (SSSI). In the south of the island Wingletang Down is noted for its heath, dune grassland and rocky coast and is the only site in Britain where the fern least adder's–tongue (Ophioglossum lusitanicum) grows. Other rare plants include the orchid autumn lady's-tresses (Spiranthes spiralis) and early meadow-grass (Poa infirma). The only freshwater pools on St Agnes are Big Pool and Little Pool in the north-west of the island which are part of the Big Pool and Browarth Point SSSI. (The land designated as Big Pool and Browarth Point SSSI is entirely owned by the Duchy of Cornwall) Big Pool shows evidence for inundation by the 1755 Lisbon tsunami that was caused by the 1755 Lisbon earthquake. The vegetation has some brackish influence because of occasional influx of the sea during winter storms with rushes such as saltmarsh rush (Juncus gerardi) and sea club–rush (Scirpus maritimus). The surrounding grassland, which is also a cricket pitch, is notable for the clovers amongst its flora including western clover (Trifolium occidentale), suffocated clover (T. suffocatum) and subterranean clover (T. subterraneum). Other plants include adder's-tongue (Ophioglossum vulgatum) and small adder's-tongue (O. azoricum).

=== Vagrant birds ===
St Agnes is visited by birdwatchers, particularly during the ″Scilly season″ of September and October. Among the many vagrant birds which have been found here around this time are the following, which were all ″firsts″ for Britain:

- Northern waterthrush (Parkesia noveboracensis) found at Covean on 30 September 1958 and stayed there until 12 October 1958.
- Bobolink (Dolichonyx oryzivorus) near Big Pool on 19 September 1962.
- Blackpoll warbler (Setophaga striata) discovered in the Parsonage garden on 12 October 1968 and remained on the island until 25 October 1968.
- Europe's first hooded warbler (Wilsonia citrina) at Big Pool from 21 September 1972 to 23 September.
- Semipalmated plover (Charadrius semipalmatus) first found at Porth Killier on 9 October 1978 and stayed around on Periglis until 9 November 1978.
- Europe's first magnolia warbler (Setophaga magnolia) in Barnaby Lane on 27 and 28 September 1981.
- Eastern Bonelli's warbler (Phylloscopus orientalis) in 1987.
- Wood thrush (Hylocichla mustelina) at Wingletang Down on 7 October 1987.
- Short-toed eagle (Circaetus gallicus) in 1999.

In addition:

- a yellow-browed bunting (Emberiza chrysophrys) in 1994 was Britain's fourth.
- a Cream-coloured courser (Cursorius cursor) in 2004 was the first to be seen in Britain for 20 years.

Among rare vagrants recorded at other times of year are the following:

- Blue-cheeked bee-eater (Merops superciliosus) on 22 June 1951; a first for Britain.
- Britain's fifth and Scilly's first Balearic woodchat shrike (Lanius senator badius) at Troy Town from 21 to 27 April 1999. (Accepted by the BBRC)
- a little bustard (Tetrax tetrax) in March 2002.
- a killdeer (Charadrius vociferus) in November 2003.

== Civil parish and ward ==
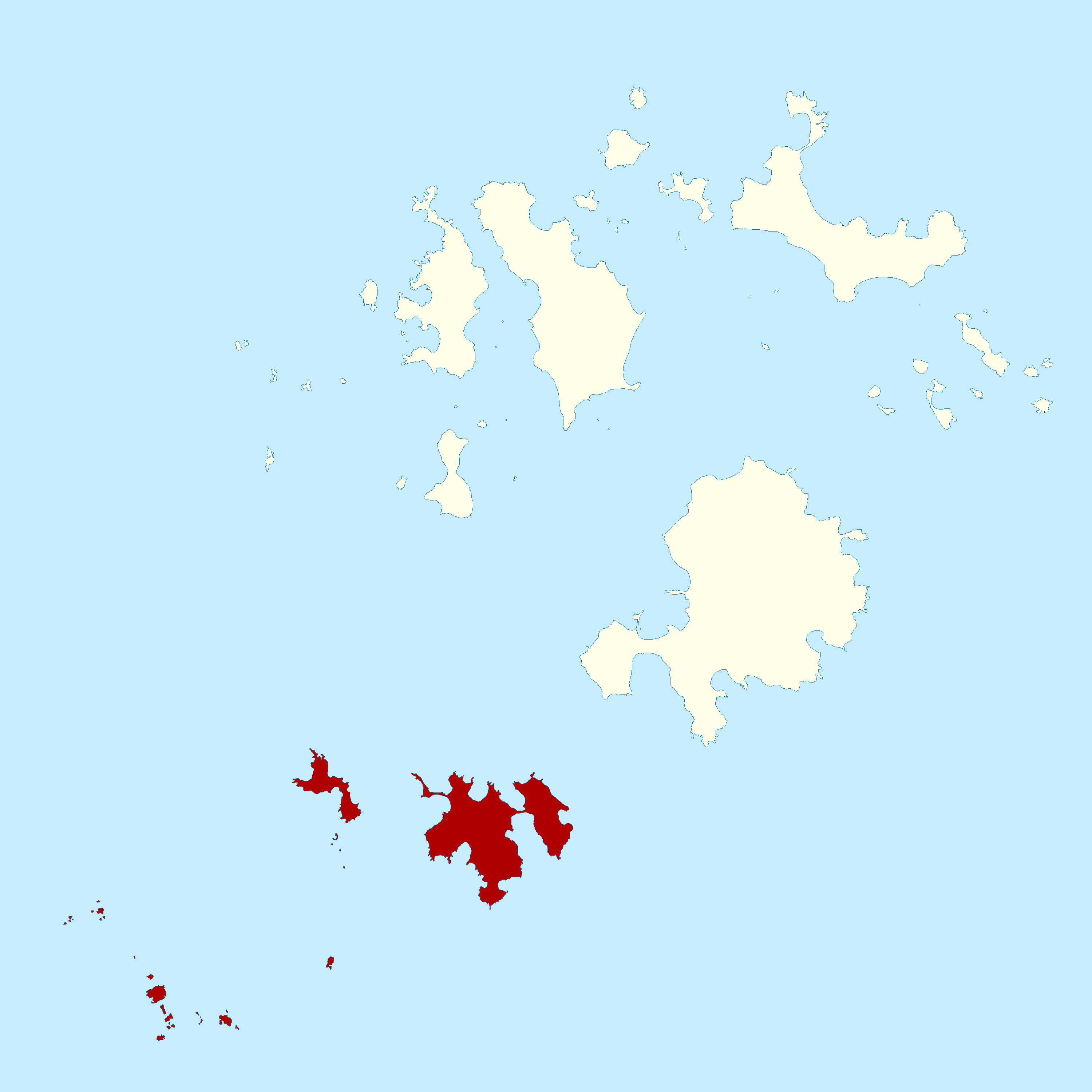
The isles of Scilly comprising the civil parish and ward of St Agnes shown in red.

St Agnes is one of the five civil parishes of the Isles of Scilly, which are also wards. The civil parish and ward include Gugh and several uninhabited islands and rocks, including the Western Rocks, Annet, Rosevear, Pednathise Head (the southernmost land in the UK) and the Bishop Rock. St Agnes returns one councillor to the Council of the Isles of Scilly, the same as the other "off-island" wards. The civil parish is not functional, however, and there is no council or meeting.

== See also ==
- List of shipwrecks of the Isles of Scilly
- List of extreme points of the United Kingdom
- St Agnes Lifeboat Station (Isles of Scilly)
