= All Saints' Church, Bryher =

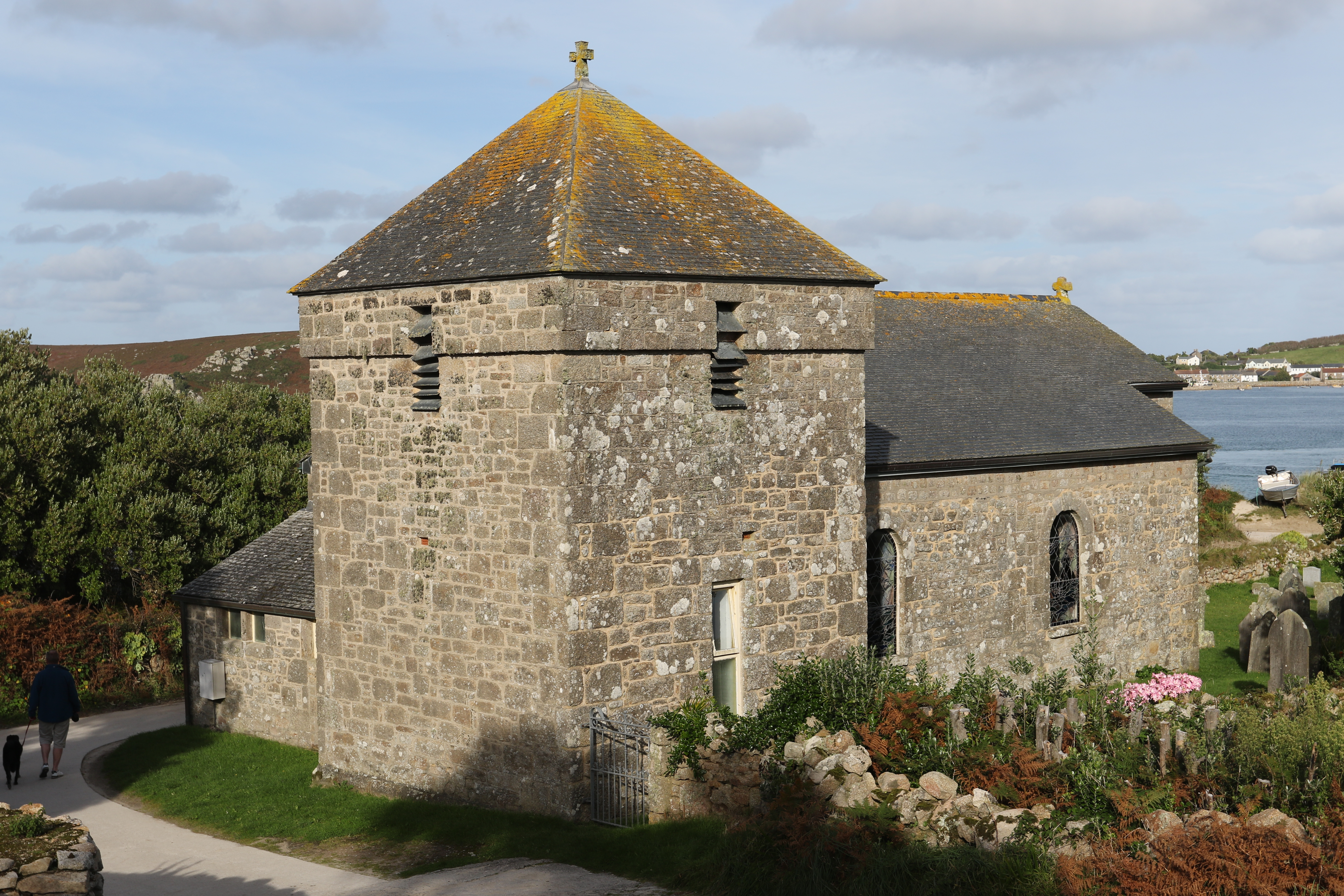
- Bryher Church
- All Saints' Church, Bryher
- 49.9526°N 6.3512°W
- OS grid reference: SV 880 149
- Location: Bryher, Isles of Scilly
- Country: England
- Denomination: Church of England
- Churchmanship: Broad Church
- Website: https://www.ioschurches.co.uk/

History
- Dedication: All Saints

Architecture
- Heritage designation: Grade II listed

Administration
- Province: Canterbury
- Diocese: Truro
- Deanery: Powder
- Parish: Bryher

All Saints' Church is a Grade II listed parish church in the Church of England located in Bryher, Isles of Scilly.

== History ==
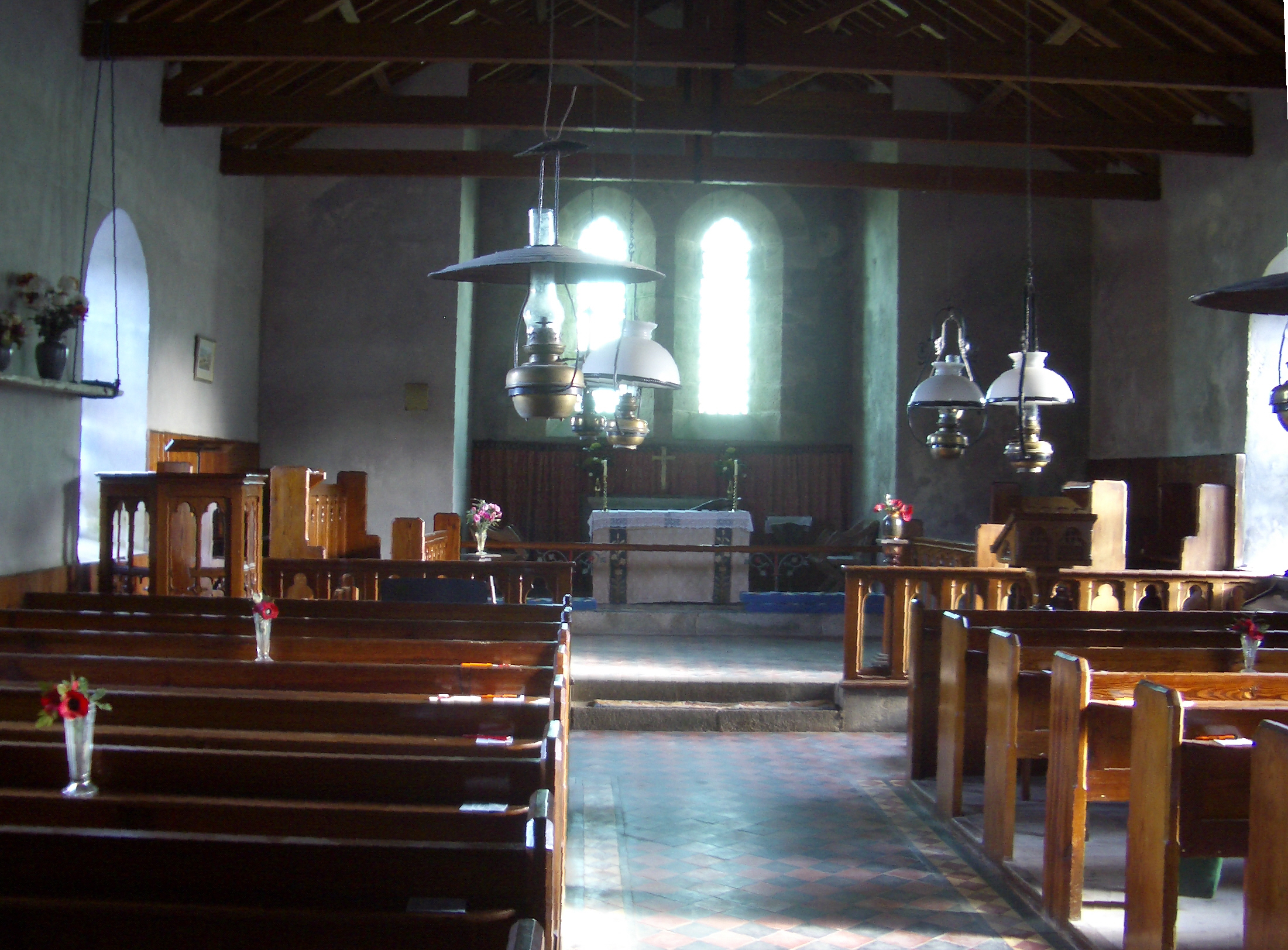
View of the east end

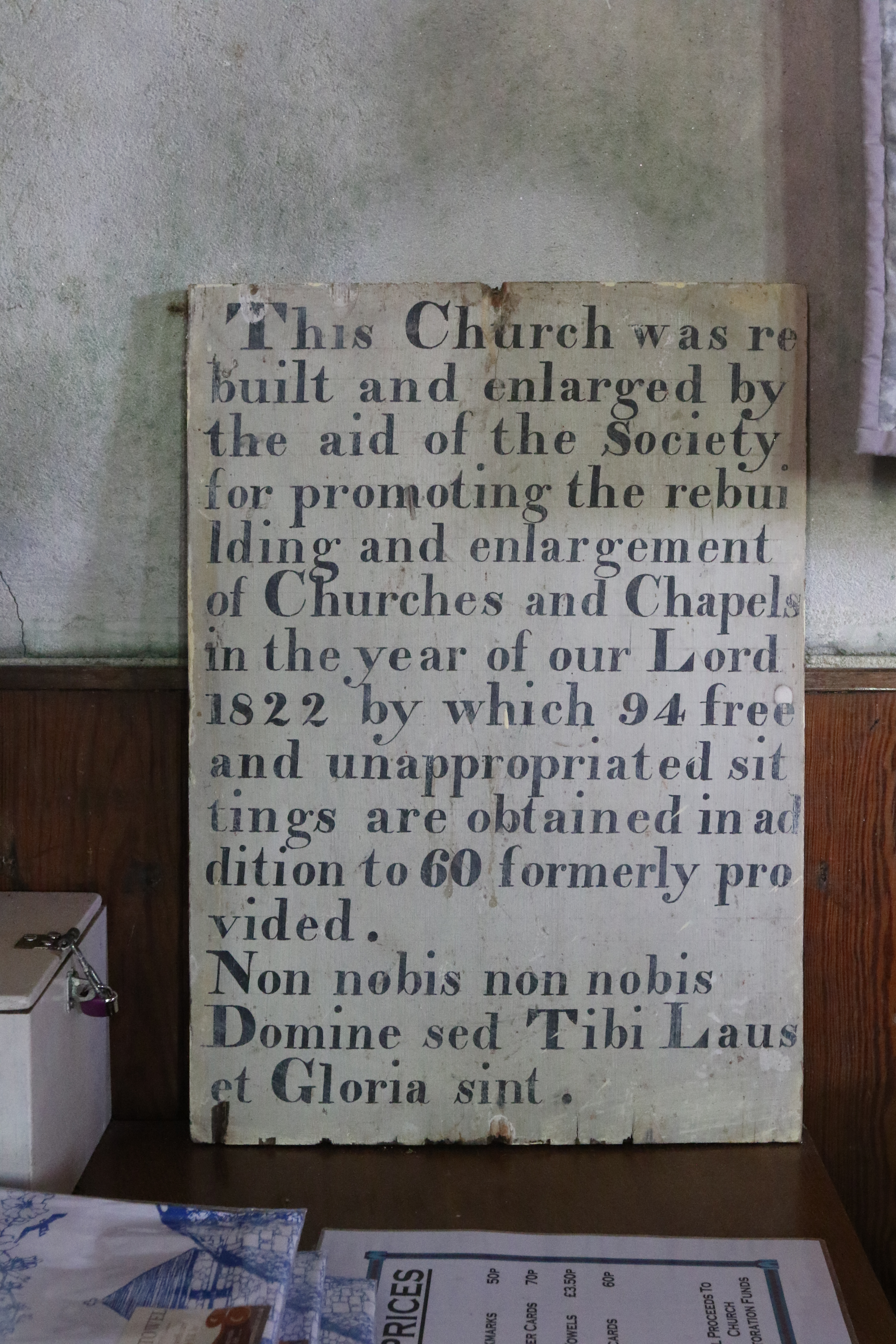
History board for the 1822 restoration

Bryher is the most westerly settlement in England, therefore All Saints' Anglican church can claim to be the most westerly church in the Anglican provinces of Canterbury and York.

The earliest record of a permanent church on Bryher is the account of the dedication of a small building to 'God and All Saints' by the Chaplain of St Mary's, Revd Paul Hathaway, in 1742. It was approximately 24 feet by 13 feet and also served the community on Samson.

The church is built of granite rubble on a rectangular plan and was enlarged in 1822 by the surveyor Christopher Strick to provide seating for 154 people. There were repairs in 1832 and 1833 by Thomas Downing, carpenter and William Williams. The tower and porch were added in 1860. There is a plain granite font dated 1861. There were additions and alterations in 1882 and a new chancel was added in 1897 and new roof (6 feet higher than the previous) in 1930.

The church has been listed since 1975. The stained glass windows were replaced, the work being completed in 2007; all four lights are by Oriel Hicks of Phoenix Studio and represent sayings of Jesus Christ.

Services are held once a week at the church, in addition to special occasions such as weddings and christenings. The first confirmation service ever recorded at the church took place in 2013.

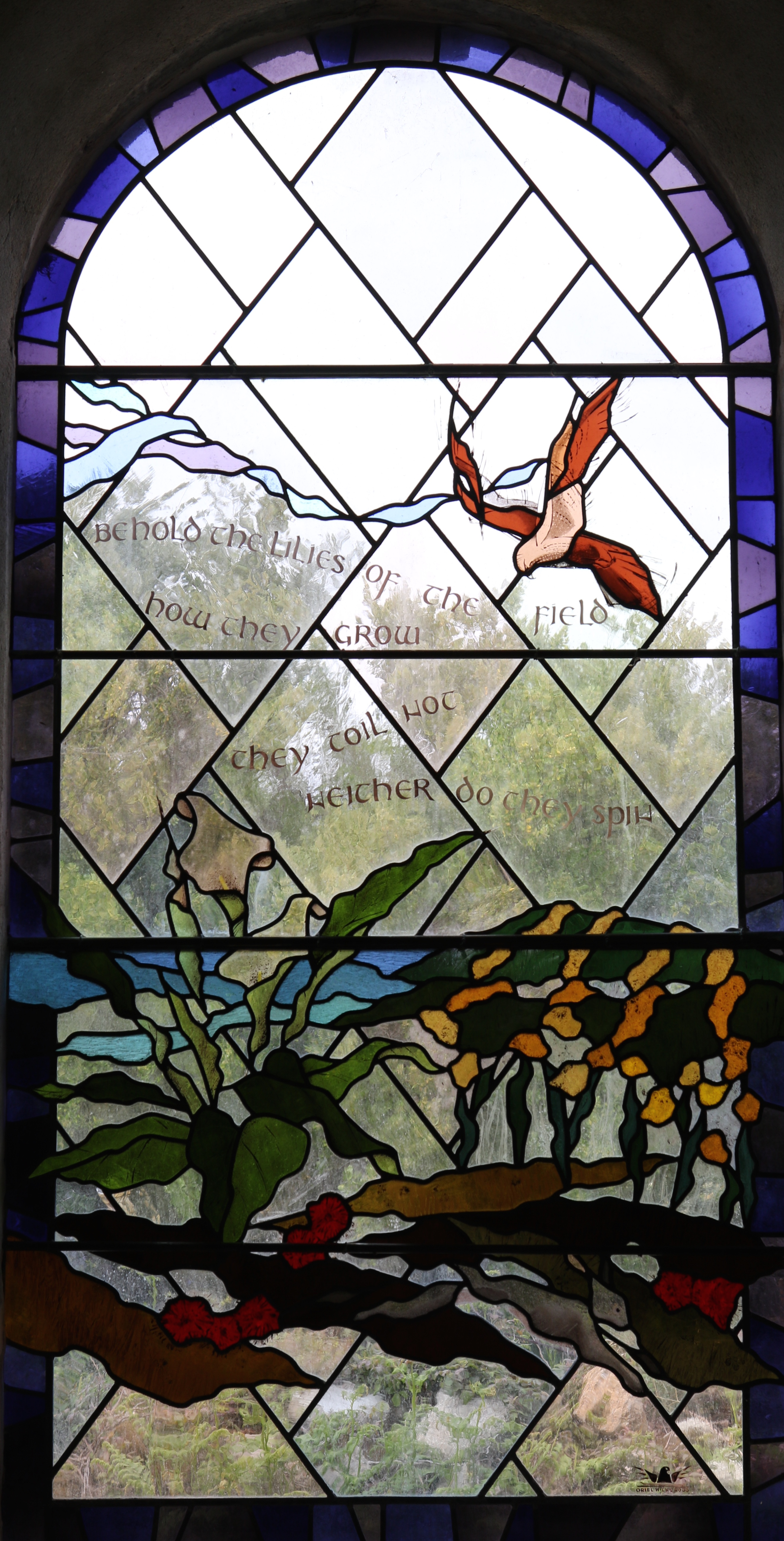
Stained-glass window by Oriel Hicks

== Parish structure ==
All Saints' Church is within the United Benefice of the Isles of Scilly parishes, which also includes:

- St Agnes' Church, St Agnes
- St Martin's Church, St Martin's
- St Mary's Church, St Mary's
- St Mary's Old Church, St Mary's
- St Nicholas's Church, Tresco

== Sources ==
- Nikolaus Pevsner (1970) The Buildings of England, Cornwall
