= St Mary's Old Church, St Mary's =

Church in Cornwall, England

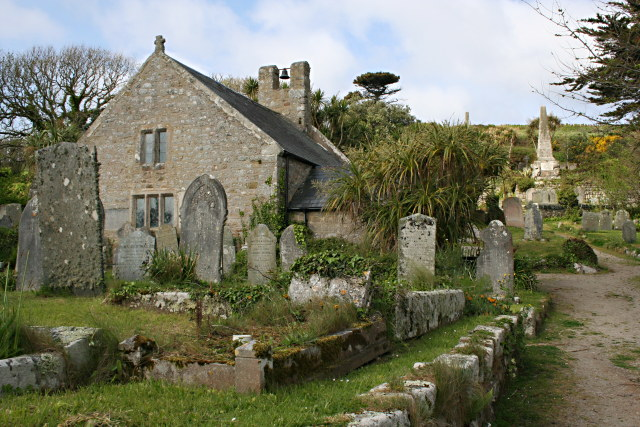
- St Mary's Old Church, Old Town, St Mary's
- St Mary's Old Church, St Mary's
- 49°54′39″N 06°18′13″W
- OS grid reference: SV911101
- Denomination: Church of England
- Churchmanship: Broad Church
- Website: https://www.ioschurches.co.uk/

History
- Dedication: Blessed Virgin Mary

Administration
- Province: Canterbury
- Diocese: Truro
- Deanery: Powder
- Parish: St Mary's, Isles of Scilly

Clergy
- Vicar: Revd Guy C Scott

Listed Building – Grade II*
- Official name: The Old Church of St Mary
- Designated: 6 April 1959
- Reference no.: 1141210

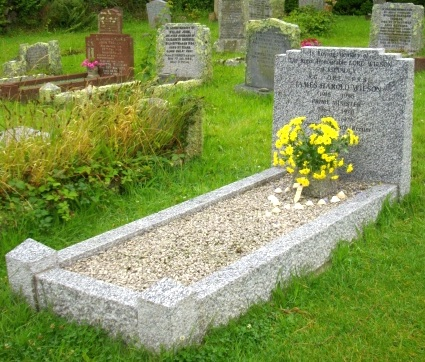
Harold Wilson's grave

St Mary's Old Church, St Mary's is a parish church in the Church of England located in Old Town on St Mary's, Isles of Scilly, Cornwall, United Kingdom.

== History ==
The Anglican church of St Mary was built at Old Town, Isles of Scilly during the 12th century, perhaps around 1130. Re-building was carried out between 1660 and 1667 including the addition of the south aisle, and a west end gallery for soldiers from the Garrison. Further improvements were made in 1743 when the east end was rebuilt. By the nineteenth century, it was derelict and under the orders of Augustus Smith, Lord Proprietor of the Islands, it was restored and re-opened on 17 November 1890.

== Churchyard ==
The churchyard of Old Town church serves as the principal cemetery for the island of St Mary's. Over the centuries countless members of the old Scilly families have been buried here, as have been the crews of numerous ships lost near the Isles. Among them are Sir John Narborough and his brother James, the sons of Rear Admiral Sir John Narborough, who both died in the sinking of HMS Association in 1707. Also buried here is Ann Cargill (1760–1784), an 18th-century opera diva and celebrated beauty of her time. She died when her ship sank off the Western Rocks and was first buried on Rosevear, before eventually being interred at Old Town Church.

Harold Wilson, Lord Wilson of Rievaulx KG OBE FRS PC, who served as Prime Minister of the United Kingdom from 1964 to 1970 and again from 1974 to 1976, is buried in the churchyard. Wilson had begun holidaying in the Scillies in the 1950s, building Lowenva a holiday home for his family, and spent much of his retirement on the island. The ashes of his wife, Mary, were interred in the grave in 2018.

The churchyard has been enlarged and redesigned several times. Today it is divided into several sections with the oldest surrounding the church itself. This part of the cemetery features a monument to Augustus Smith (1804–1872) as well as mass graves of passengers drowned in the sinking of SS Schiller (1875). During the 19th century, terraces were cut into the hillside to make room for more burials.

The churchyard contains the grave of MP Ray Gunter (1909–1977), Minister of Labour under Prime Minister Harold Wilson. The grave of Lieutenant Roy Graham (1924–2007), who led the 1967 naval diving expedition that discovered the wreck of Admiral Sir Cloudesley Shovell's flagship HMS Association, can be found in one of the newer sections of the cemetery.

== Parish structure ==
St Mary's Old Church is within the United Benefice of the Isles of Scilly parishes, comprising

- All Saints' Church, Bryher
- St Agnes' Church, St Agnes
- St Martin's Church, St Martin's
- St Mary's Church, St Mary's
- St Nicholas's Church, Tresco

== Sources ==
- Nikolaus Pevsner (1970) Cornwall; 2nd ed. (The Buildings of England). Penguin; p. 209
