= Wingletang Down (St Agnes) =

Wingletang Down, St Agnes
- Site of Special Scientific Interest
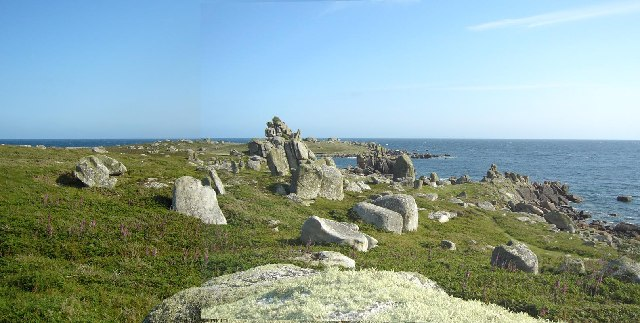
- Wingletang Down, looking south

- Location within Isles of Scilly
- Location of Wingletang Down, St Agnes.
- Grid reference: SV883076
- Coordinates: 49.888°N 6.341°W
- Interest: Biological
- Area: 28.9 hectares (0.2890 km^{2}; 0.1116 sq mi)
- Notification date: 1971

Wingletang Down is a Site of Special Scientific Interest (SSSI) on the southern side of the island of St Agnes in the Isles of Scilly, England, UK, which is noted for its biological characteristics. All of the land designated as Wingletang Down SSSI is owned by the Duchy of Cornwall. The site is managed by the Isles of Scilly Wildlife Trust and is within the Isles of Scilly Heritage Coast and the Isles of Scilly Area of Outstanding Natural Beauty. It is the only site in Great Britain and Ireland for the small fern, least adder's–tongue (Ophioglossum lusitanicum). As of 11 September 2009 the SSSI was considered to be in ″unconditional recovering″ condition because European gorse (Ulex europaeus) and bramble (Rubus fruticosus) are at unacceptable levels.

== History ==
Forty–three Bronze Age cairns have been recorded, some of which have granite kerbstones and others are linked by hedge walls. A cairn usually indicates a burial site.

On the west side of St Warna's Cove is a stone–lined well that is reputed to be of great antiquity, and close to where the saint is supposed to have come ashore in a coracle after a journey from Ireland. The name Warna is unknown anywhere else as a Celtic saint, and may be the name of a Celtic water goddess. In the past pins were dropped into the well as an offering to encourage storms to drive ships ashore. Wrecks were a vital resource for coastal communities. Ceramic beads from the 17th-century wreck of a Venetian ship can be found on the beach at Beady Pool on Wingletang Bay.

== Geology ==
The underlying rock is Hercynian granite covered by thin, skeletal and podzolic soils on the higher land where there are many weathered outcrops. At the southernmost tip is Horse Point which is almost separated from the rest of St Agnes by a narrow neck of blown sand between two bays; Wingletang Bay and Porth Askin. Along the coast to the west towards St Warna Cove are boulder beaches.

== Wildlife and ecology ==
Wingletang Down is 71 acres (28.9 ha) of maritime heath, dune grassland and scrub reaching a maximum height of 66 feet (20 m) above sea level and is considered by Plantlife to be an Important Plant Area. Due to exposure to salt–laden winds, wind-pruned or "waved" maritime heath has developed on the low nutrient, shallow soils on the higher land, whilst to the south on the deeper sandy soils close to sea–level dune grassland grows. At the southern promontory of Horse Point there is short maritime grass and a tumble of large granite boulders where shallow temporary brackish pools occur. Sea milkwort (Glaux maritima) is a rare plant in Scilly and grows here. Sand sedge (Carex arenaria) and sand couch (Elytrigia juncea) dominate the dune grassland between Wingletang Bay and Porth Askin whilst flowering plants include common storksbill (Erodium cicutarium), Portland spurge (Euphorbia portlandica) and hemlock water dropwort (Oenanthe crocata) which is unusual here as it usually grows in wet habitats. At Beady Pool, which is part of Wingletang Bay, sea kale (Crambe maritima) grows on the strandline along with yellow horned poppy (Glaucium flavum) and sea spurge (Euphorbia paralias). There is a colony of six–spot burnet (Zygaena filipendulae) here and in the past ringed plover (Charadrius hiaticula) nested. The nationally scarce (but common on all the inhabited islands) early meadow grass (Poa infirma) grows in the short maritime grass west of Porth Askin.

The wind pruned maritime heath, on the higher part of the site is dominated by western gorse (Ulex gallii), heather (Calluna vulgaris) and bell heather (Erica cinerea). This heath is unique because all three Ophioglossum species found in the British Isles have been recorded within this small area. The largest and easiest to find is adder's–tongue (Ophioglossum vulgatum) which is the commonest on the mainland but the rarest in Scilly and has not been seen in the Isles (on St Agnes) since 1990, or on Wingletang Down since 1938. The second which has been recorded on all the inhabited islands is small adders's–tongue (Ophioglossum azoricum), which is nationally scarce and found along the western coast of Britain and Ireland north to Orkney and Shetland; there is only one recent Cornish (unconfirmed) record from near Porthgwarra. The third is least adder's–tongue which, in Britain, is known only from this small area of St Agnes, where it was discovered in March 1950 by John Raven who found a colony of about one hundred fronds covering an area of one square metre. Botanists have since found other colonies all within the area of the downs. The probable reason for its late discovery is because the 0.79 inches (2 cm) fronds are found in the winter and turn yellow and disintegrate by early April which is before most botanists are in the area. Since the withdrawal of grazing by cattle and, due to Myxomatosis, the fall in the population of rabbits (Oryctolagus cuniculus), some of the colonies are in danger of being smothered by competitive vegetation such as bracken (Pteridium aquilinum), European gorse and bramble. Outside of the Isles of Scilly the nearest colony is in Guernsey where it was discovered in 1854.
