= St Nicholas's Church, Tresco =

St Nicholas' Church, Tresco
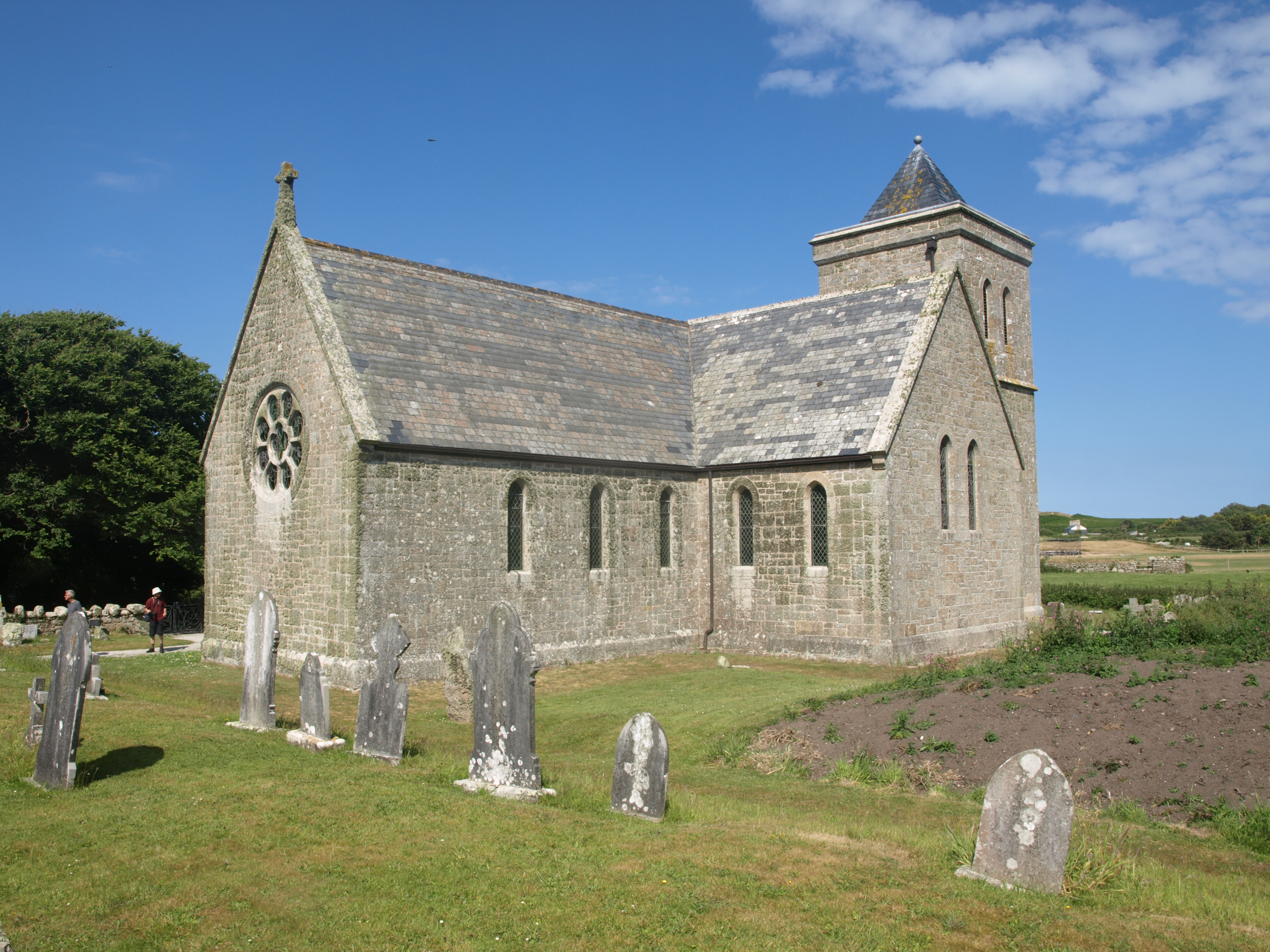
- Tresco Church
- St Nicholas' Church, Tresco
- 49°57′28″N 06°20′06″W
- OS grid reference: SV 892 154
- Location: Tresco, Isles of Scilly
- Country: England
- Denomination: Church of England
- Churchmanship: Broad Church
- Website: https://www.ioschurches.co.uk/

History
- Dedication: Saint Nicholas
- Consecrated: 16 July 1882

Architecture
- Heritage designation: Grade II listed
- Architect(s): Mr Cutts and Thomas Dorrien-Smith
- Groundbreaking: 12 September 1877
- Completed: 17 June 1879

Specifications
- Capacity: 250 persons
- Length: 81 feet (25 m)
- Width: 48 feet (15 m)

Administration
- Province: Canterbury
- Diocese: Truro
- Deanery: Powder
- Parish: Tresco

St Nicholas's Church, Tresco, is a parish church in the Church of England located in Tresco, Isles of Scilly, UK.

== History ==
Originally two old cottages were used by the Society for Promoting Christian Knowledge (SPCK) as a church. Augustus Smith provided funds to make the building cruciform, adding a north transept (the cottages formed an aisle with south transept) and an eastern end. According to tradition a gallery was constructed from the timbers of a ship wrecked on St Helen's; increasing the capacity to 200.

Edith Dorrien-Smith laid the foundation stone of the Anglican church of St Nicholas on 12 September 1877, near the old building. The principal benefactor was Lady Sophia Tower. The church was opened for worship on 17 June 1879 by Edward White Benson, the first Bishop of Truro. It was consecrated on 16 July 1882, a delay due to an undisclosed ″legal difficulty″. The dedication of the church to St Nicholas is the same as the dedication of the medieval Tresco Abbey, the remains of which are in Tresco Abbey Gardens. The new churchyard included the old one, and was planted with aloes, dracaenas, flowering plants and evergreens.

The three-panelled reredos is made of red serpentine and inlaid with a marble cross, aureola and sacred emblems. It was fixed in position in May 1879. The font is also made of serpentine, mounted on small granite columns. The reredos and font were manufactured by Messrs Bradbury at their serpentine manufactury at the Folly, Penzance. The reredos was made to the designs of Charles Eamer Kempe.

== Organ ==
The pipe organ dates from 1886 and is by the builder Eustace Ingram. The specification can be found on the National Pipe Organ Register.

== Parish structure ==
St Nicholas's Church is within the United Benefice of the Isles of Scilly parishes, comprising

- All Saints' Church, Bryher
- St Agnes' Church, St Agnes.
- St Martin's Church, St Martin's
- St Mary's Church, St Mary's
- St Mary's Old Church, St Mary's,

== Gallery ==
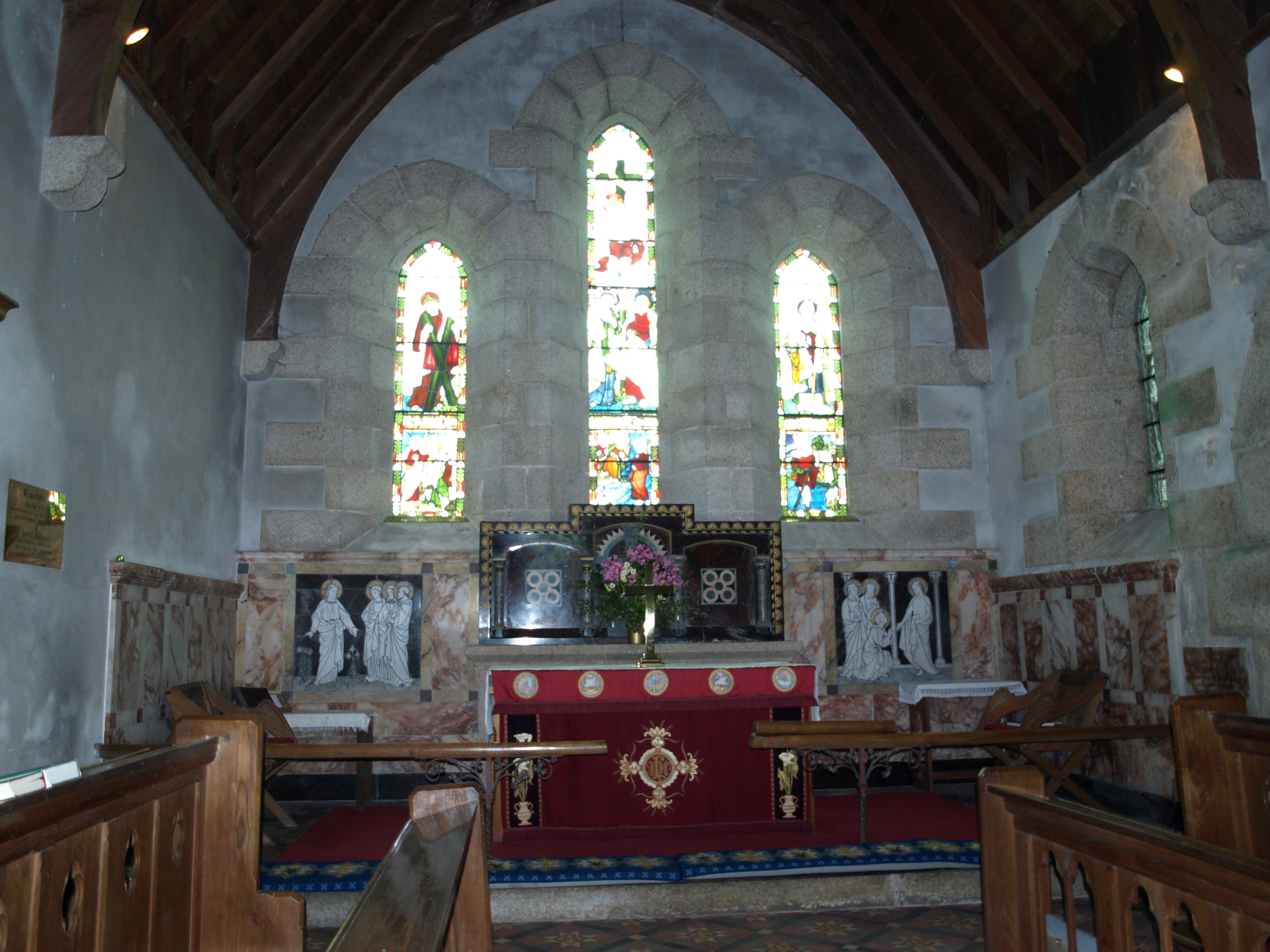
The sanctuary

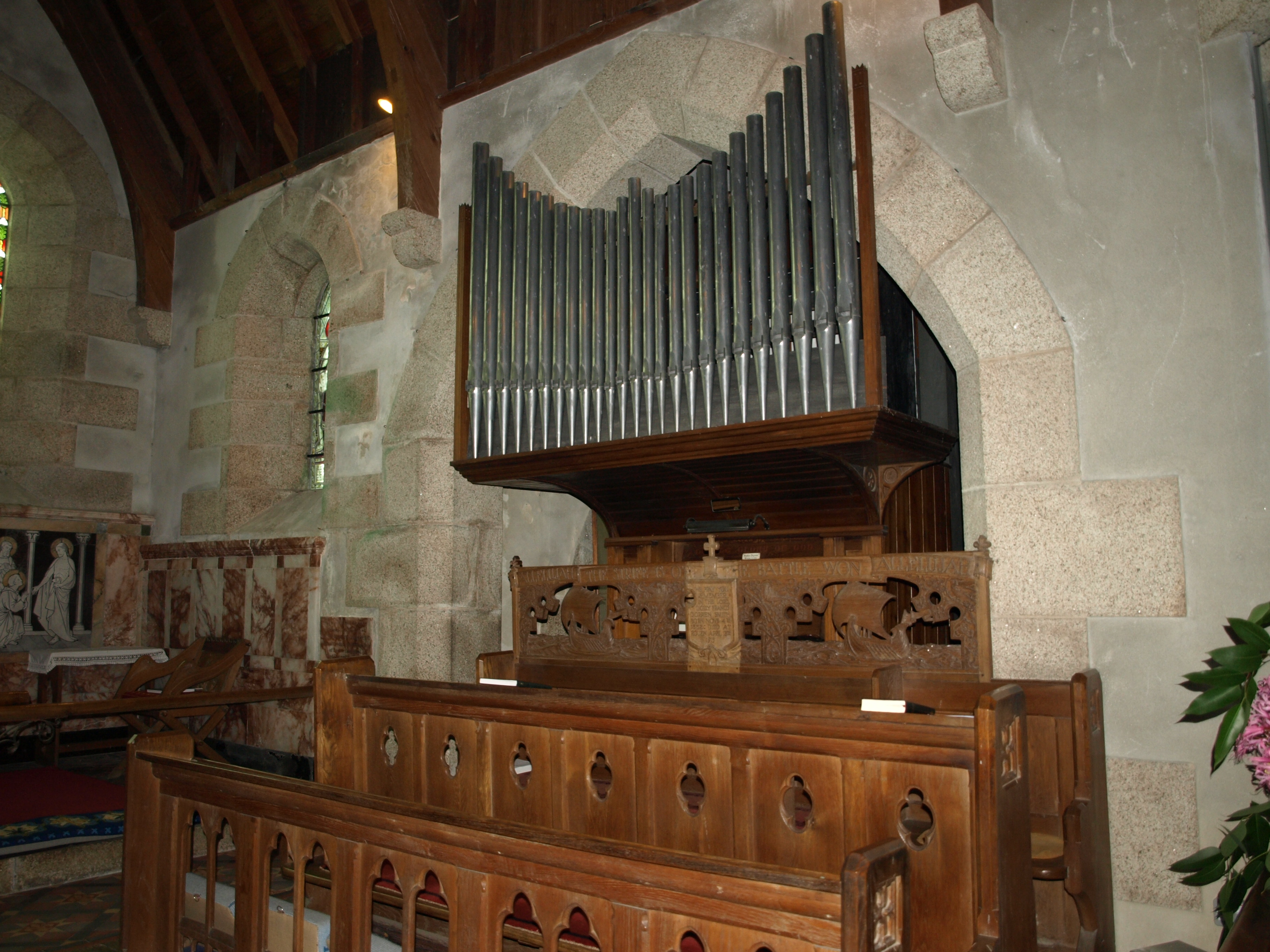
The organ

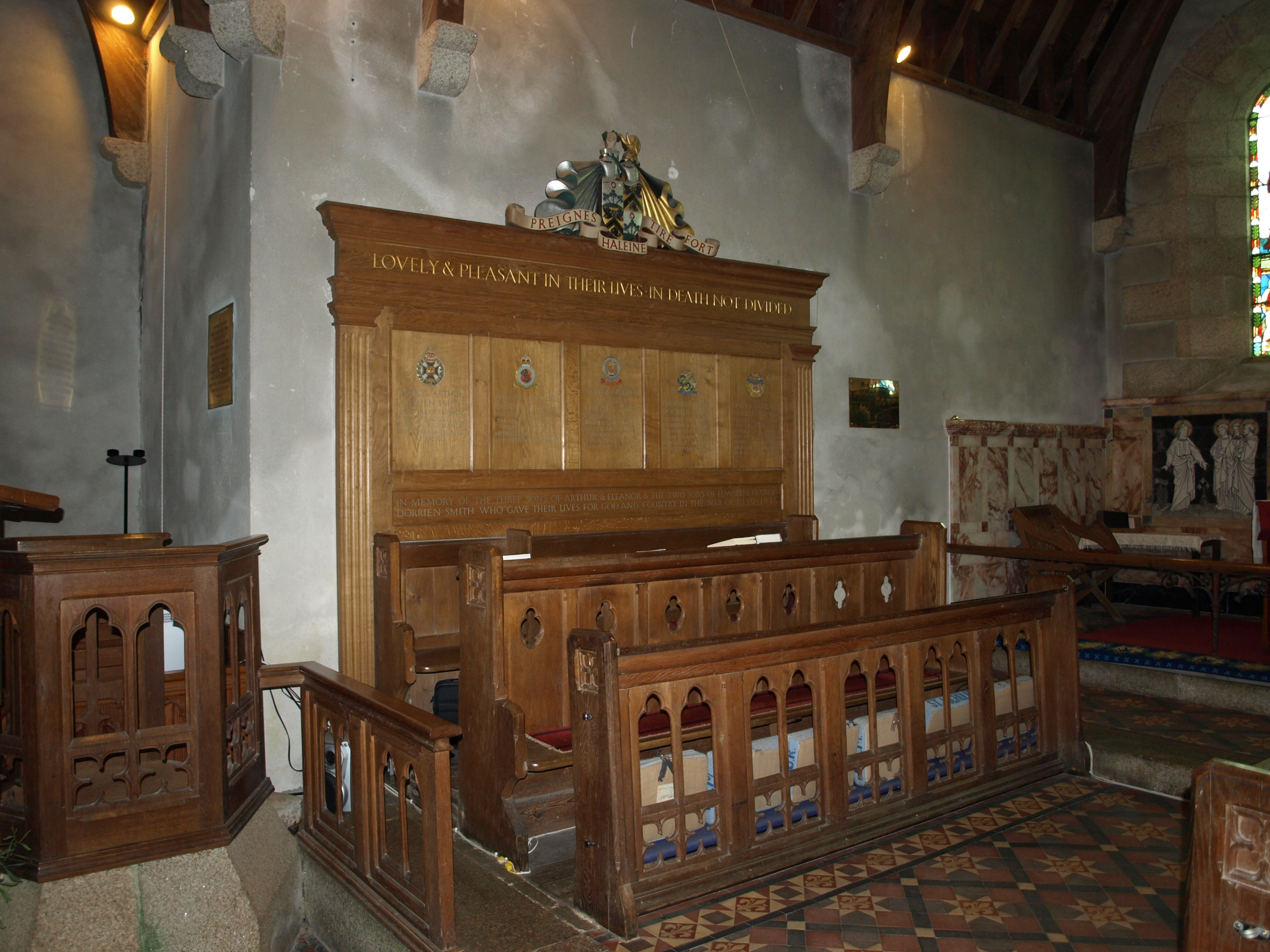
The war memorial

== See also ==
- Listed buildings in Tresco, Isles of Scilly

== Sources ==
- The Buildings of England, Cornwall. Nikolaus Pevsner
