= St Martin's Church, St Martin's =

Church in Cornwall, England

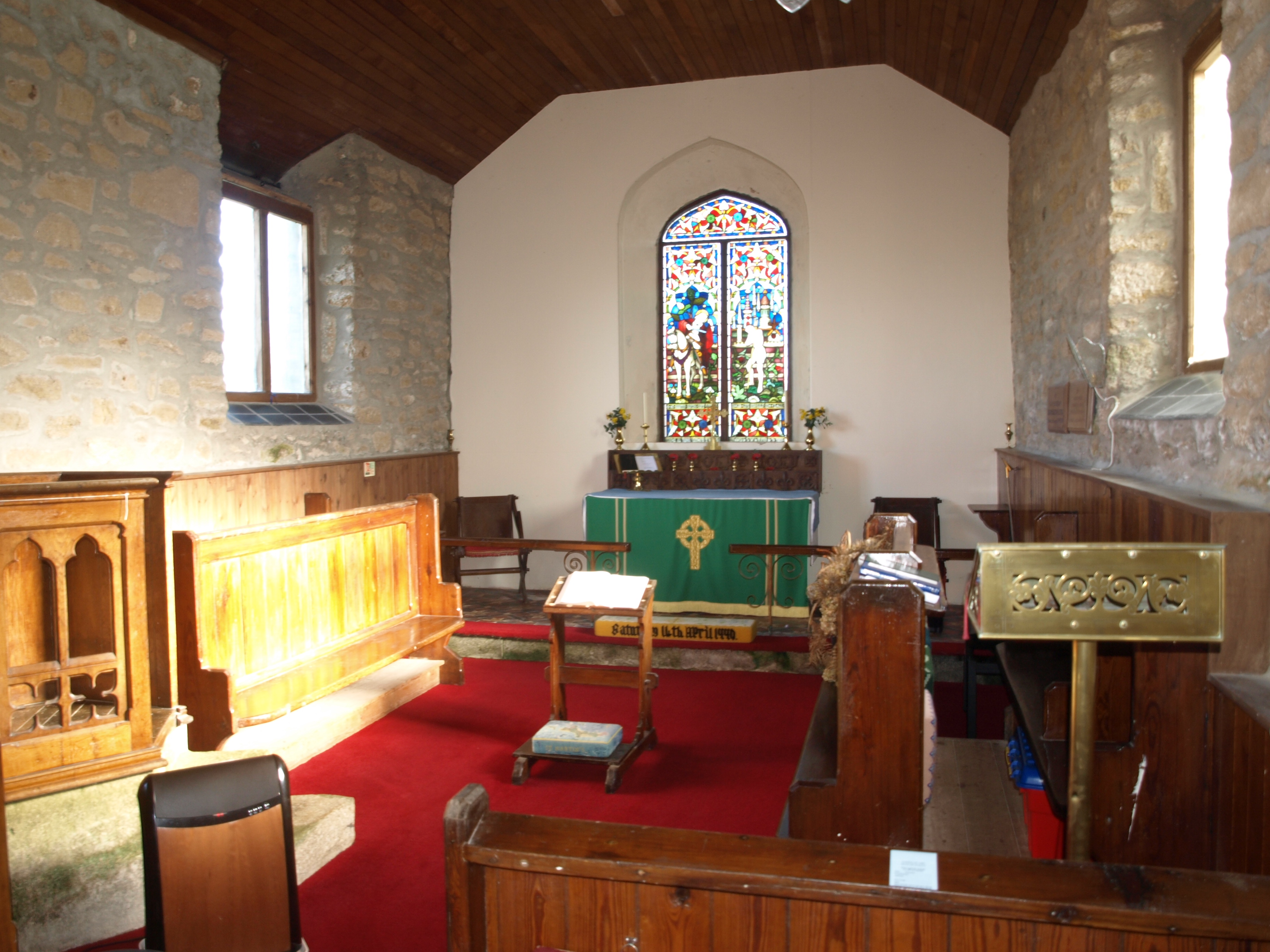
- St Martin's Church, St Martin's
- St Martin's Church, St Martin's
- 49°57′41″N 06°17′02″W
- OS grid reference: SV928156
- Denomination: Church of England
- Churchmanship: Broad Church
- Website: https://www.ioschurches.co.uk/

History
- Dedication: Saint Martin

Administration
- Province: Canterbury
- Diocese: Truro
- Deanery: Powder
- Parish: St Martin's, Isles of Scilly

Clergy
- Vicar: Revd Guy C Scott

St Martin's Church, St Martin's is a Grade II listed parish church in the Church of England located in St Martin's, Isles of Scilly, UK.

== History ==
The Anglican church was built in 1683 by Thomas Ekin, the Godolphin Steward. Originally only 20 feet (6.1 m) long it was enlarged by Revd George Woodley in 1821. It was rebuilt in 1866 by Augustus Smith, after having been considerably damaged by lightning. The bell in the turret belonged to a vessel wrecked on the islands. There is a 20th-century extension at the west end.

The stained glass window at the east end depicts Saint Martin and the Beggar and is by Clayton and Bell. The church is a Grade II listed building.

There are three Commonwealth War Graves Commission memorials in the churchyard, marking the burial place of two sailors and a chaplin of the First World War. They commemorate the Third Mate A. Chichester of the Mercantile Marine S.S. "Lux." and Master W.S. Dobbing of the Mercantile Marine S.S. "Olaf.". Chichester and Dobbing both died in 1917 and the Reverend F. Raine (Chaplain 4th Class) of the Army Chaplains' Department who died in December 1918.

== Parish structure ==
St Martin's Church is within the United Benefice of the Isles of Scilly parishes, comprising

- All Saints' Church, Bryher
- St Agnes' Church, St Agnes
- St Mary's Church, St Mary's
- St Mary's Old Church, St Mary's
- St Nicholas's Church, Tresco

== Gallery ==
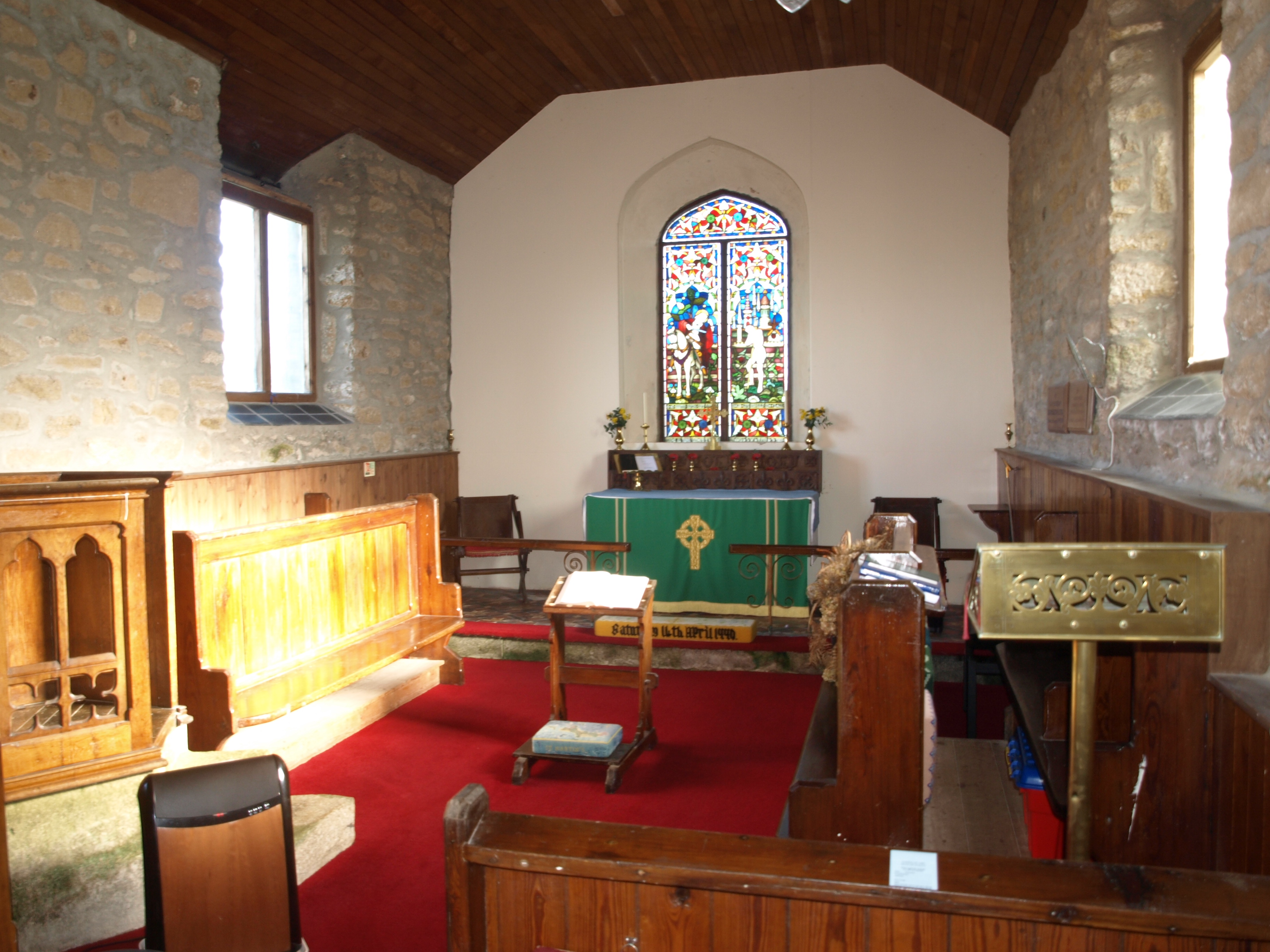
The sanctuary

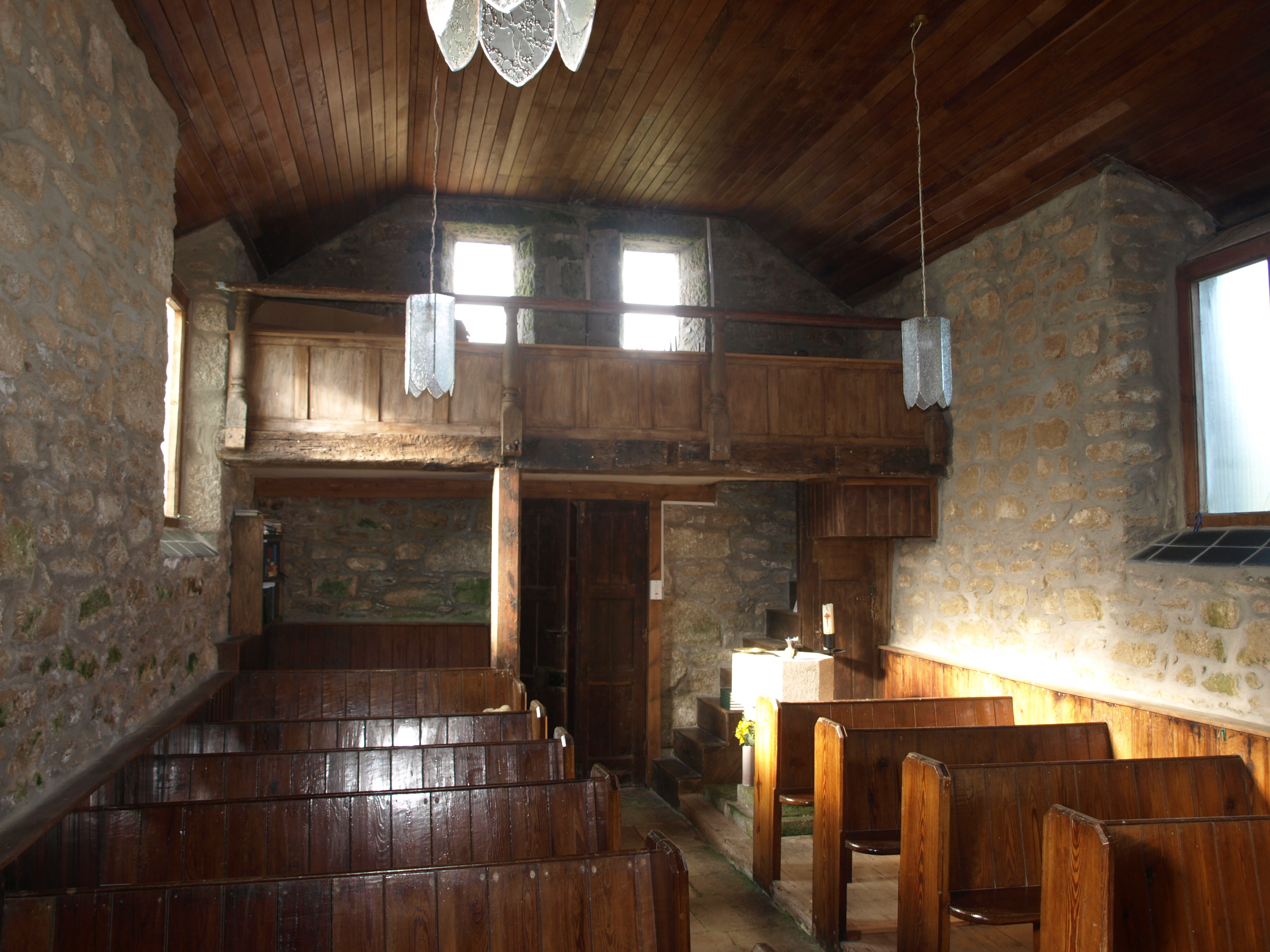
The west end and gallery

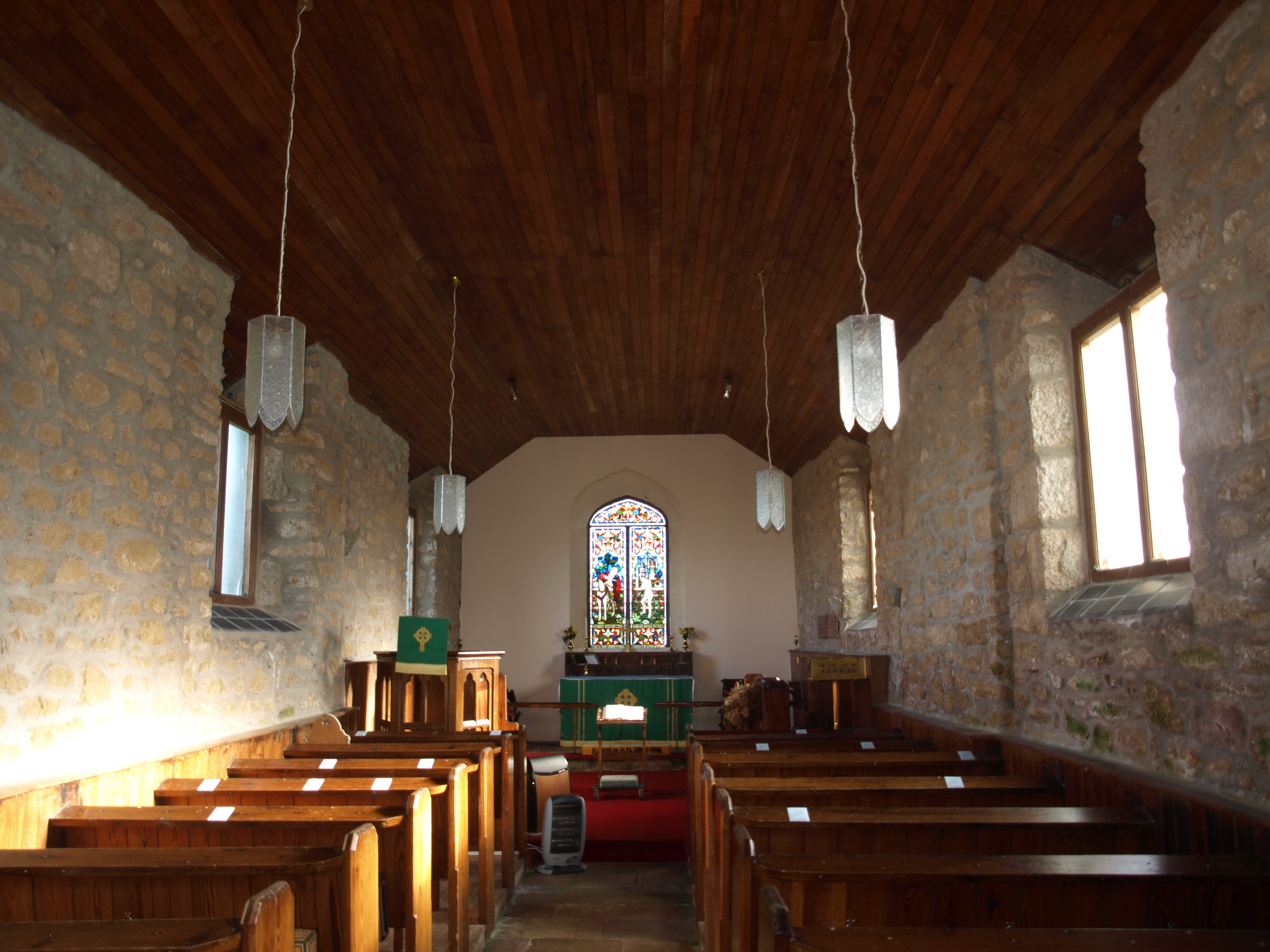
The nave

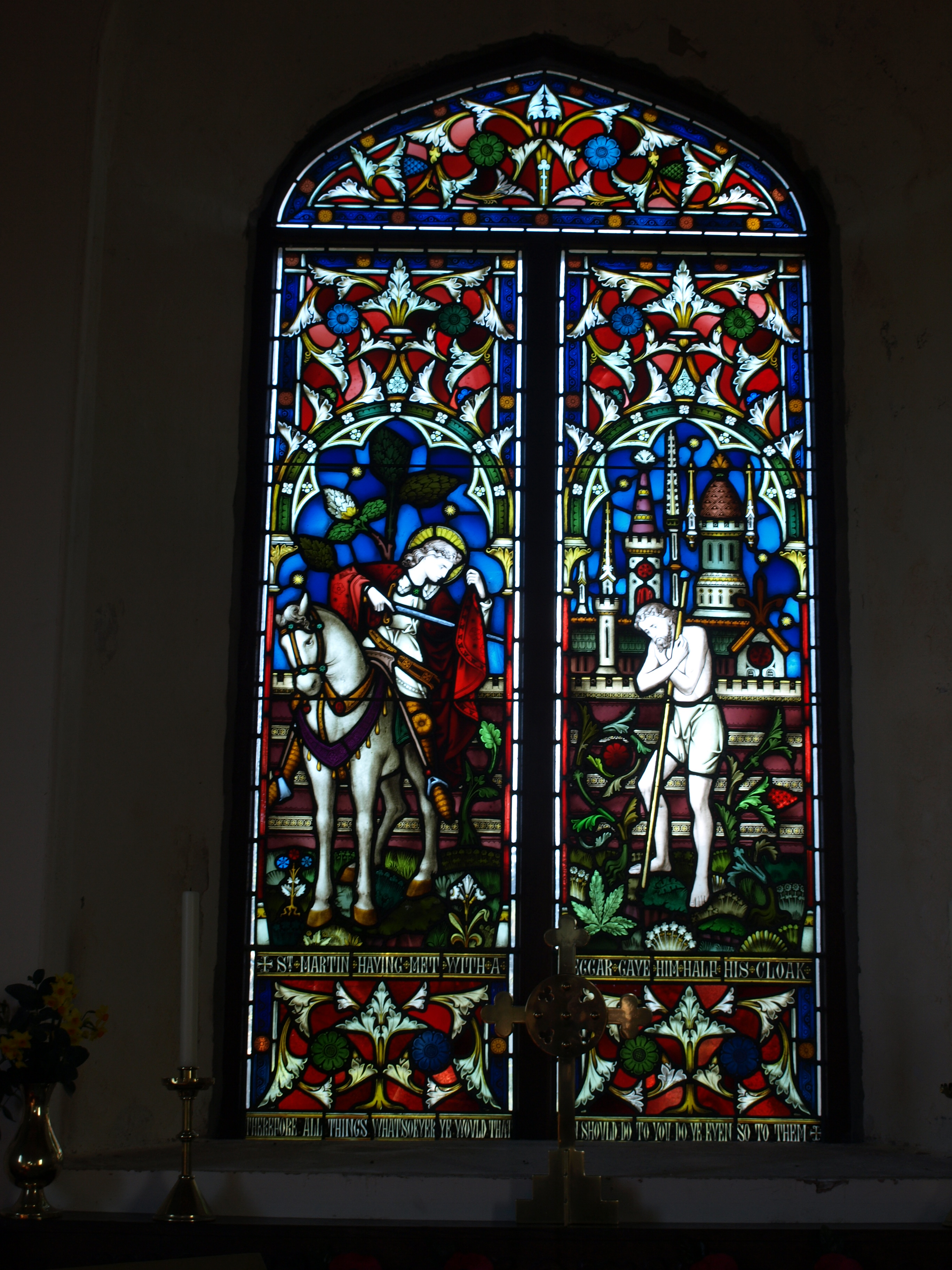
The east window

== Sources ==
- The Buildings of England, Cornwall. Nikolaus Pevsner
