= Five Islands Academy =

Academy in the Isles of Scilly, England

The Five Islands Academy
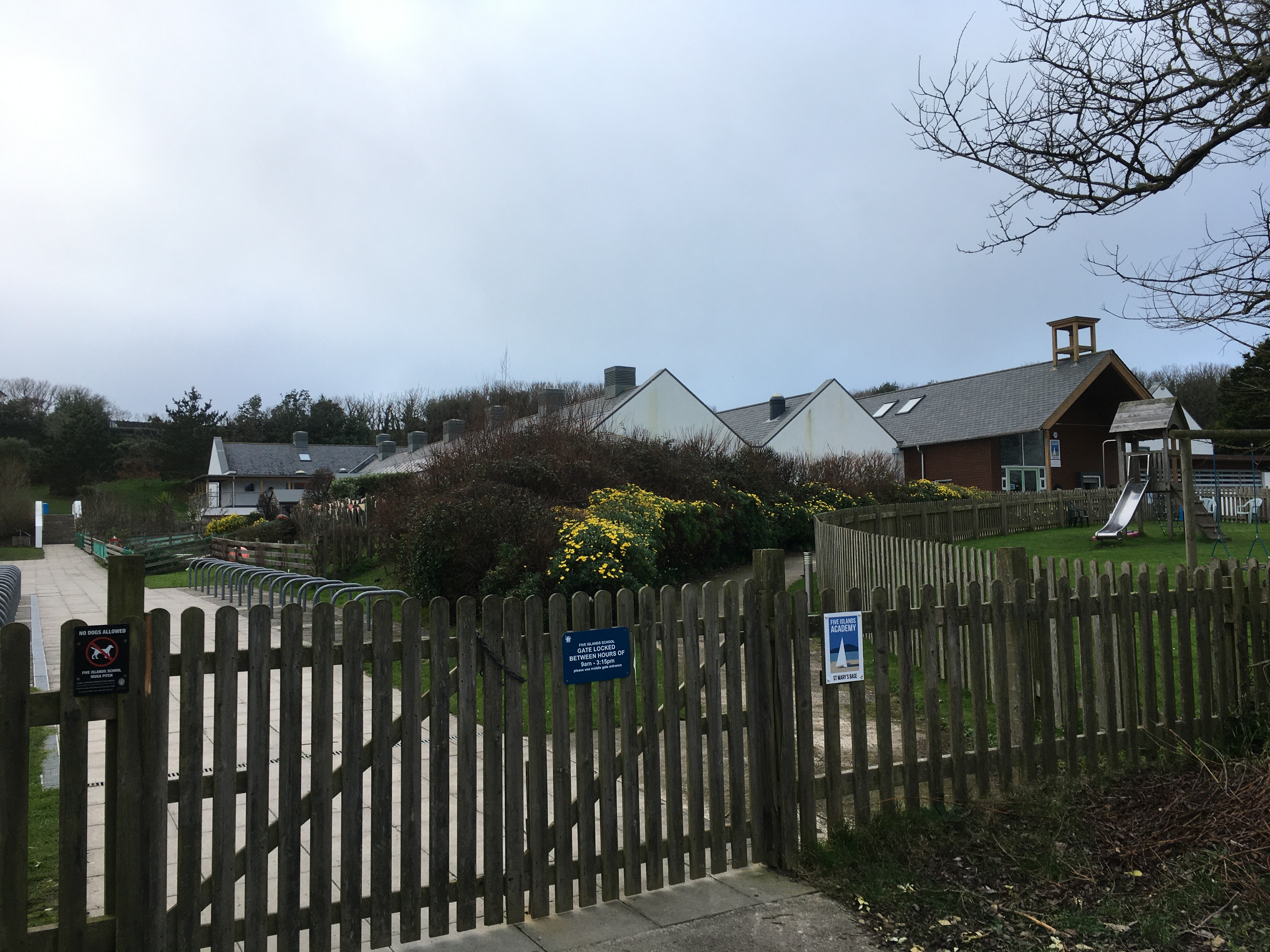

Location
- Carn Gwaval, Church Road, St Mary's, Isles of Scilly, TR21 0NA; England; 49.9125°N 6.305°W

Information
- Type: Academy
- Motto: Ethical, Excellence, Equity, Empathy, Evolution, Endurance
- Religious affiliation: Church of England
- Established: 2002
- Local authority: Council of the Isles of Scilly
- Department for Education URN: 144638 Tables
- Ofsted: Reports
- Chair: Jeremy Brown
- Head teacher: Rachel Gibb
- Gender: Mixed
- Age: 3 to 16
- Enrolment: 259
- Houses: Atlantic and Celtic
- Colours: Blue and White
- Website: Official website

Five Islands Academy, formerly Five Islands School, is the first federated school in the United Kingdom, providing primary and secondary education for children from 3 to 16 at five sites in the Isles of Scilly. As of May 2022, the headteacher is Rachel Gibb, and the Chair of the Local Academy Committee is Jeremy Brown.

== History ==
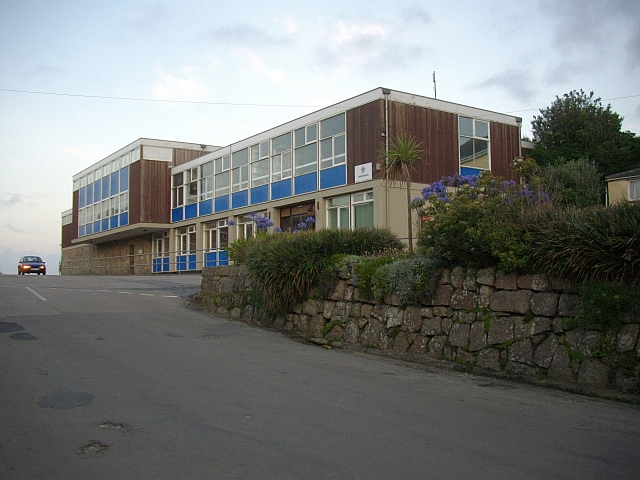
The former Carn Thomas Secondary School site, St Mary's (now demolished)

The secondary school and four primary schools were formerly five separate schools. While the smaller schools were praised by inspectors, the two larger schools on St Mary's were judged as inadequate. In response, the government forced a fresh start as a federated school, which opened in April 2002 and subsequently the other off islands bases were also federated.

An inspection in June and July 2003 again found the standard of education at the St Mary's sites to be inadequate, and the school was placed in special measures until 2005.

Under a succession of heads, the school had become a successful and cohesive federation, judged "outstanding" by the Office for Standards in Education (Ofsted) in 2007.

In 2008, the school was given funding of £13 million to build a new 3–16 school complex on a site adjacent to the existing Carn Gwaval primary school. This development took place 2010–11 and opened in time for the 2011–12 school year, which resulted in the secondary school moving permanently away from the Carn Thomas site, as well as the primary pupils at Carn Gwaval also moving into the new neighbouring school complex. The former primary school building was modernised and extended, becoming the island's main indoor sports and fitness centre. The old secondary school, at Carn Thomas, was demolished in the winter of 2016/2017.

In the May of 2012, the then incumbent head teacher, Bryce Wilby, was suspended after allegations of financial irregularities, allegations which he strongly denied. The NCTL Panel that hears evidence of Teacher Misconduct said that the evidence from the Council’s auditors following Wilby’s 2012 suspension was “wholly unreliable” after an Independent Forensic Auditor concluded the evidence was fabricated.

In the autumn of 2012, Ofsted downgraded the schools status to “requires improvement”, citing how leadership and management at the school “requires improvement”. Later, in 2015, the case against Wilby regarding improper conduct was thrown out. His wife stated that they would take legal action against the Council of the Isles of Scilly.

Wilby continued to liaise with the DfE and in 2016, the secondary school was placed into special measures, which prompted questions over which academy trust would take it on, due to the school's geographic isolation.

Previously a voluntary controlled school administered by the Council of the Isles of Scilly, in January 2019 Five Islands School converted to academy status and was renamed The Five Islands Academy. The school is now sponsored by the Leading Edge Academies Partnership (LEAP).

In July 2021, the Duke and Duchess of Cornwall visited the school on a tour of the South West.

== Sites ==
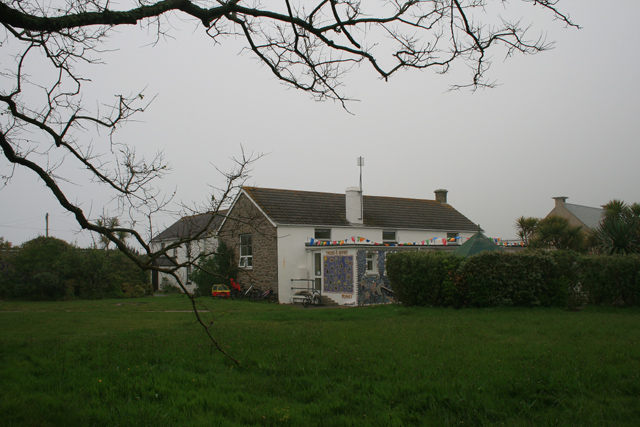
Tresco and Bryher School, Tresco

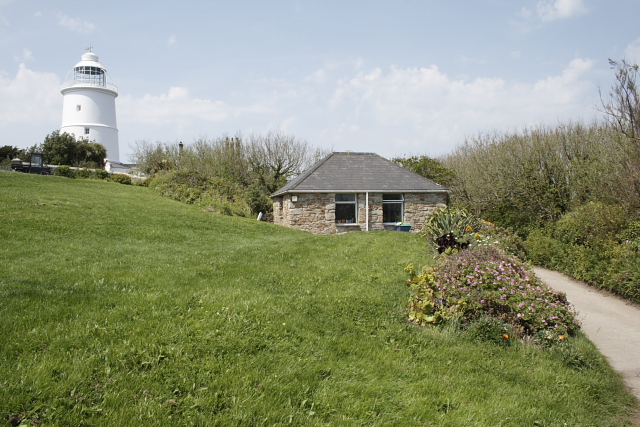
St Agnes School

Secondary education (up to GCSE) is provided only on the most populous island of St Mary's. There, it was based at the Carn Thomas site, on the eastern edge of Hugh Town, on the road to Porth Mellon, but in 2011 relocated to a new school complex at Carn Gwaval, adjacent to an existing primary base there, between Hugh Town and Old Town. Secondary pupils from the other islands are given free board at Mundesley Boarding House during the school week, returning home at the weekends and holidays.

The four primary education bases are: at Carn Gwaval, near Old Town (for St Mary's pupils); on Tresco, near Old Grimsby (for pupils from Tresco and the neighbouring island of Bryher); on St Martin's; and on St Agnes. The Carn Gwaval base has been combined since 2011 with the sole secondary education base.

As of 2003, the main campus had 117 secondary and 111 primary pupils, and the Tresco, St Agnes, and St Martin's bases had 24, 7, and 6 students, respectively. These enrollment figures are lower than the respective England-wide averages.

=== Boarding facilities ===
The boarding facility at St. Mary's is known as the Mundesley Boarding House, accommodating year 7 onwards during the school week, with students returning home by boat every weekend. The boarding building includes the original house and the extension for boarders. The original house has the dining room, kitchen, and living room on the ground floor and the house parents' flat on the first floor, while the extension has the boys' hostel and the clinic on the ground floor and the girls' hostel on the first floor. The boarding house is funded by the Department of Education, however, parents of the students residing at the house have opted to make voluntary contributions towards the upkeep of the boarding house.
