= Old Town, Isles of Scilly =

Coordinates: 49.9125°N 6.3°W

Old Town: Cornish: Treveglos
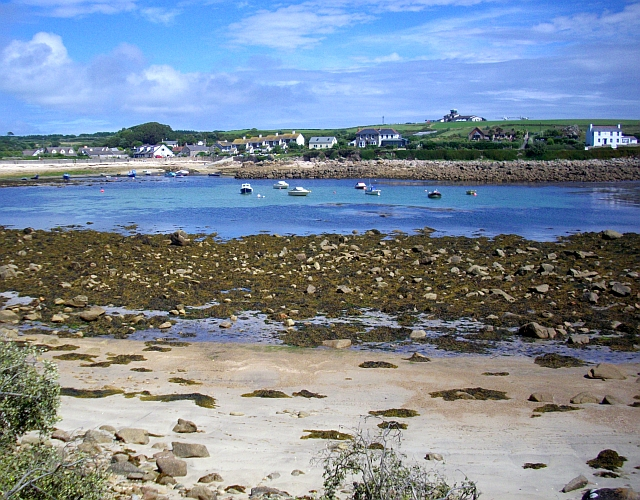
- Old Town Bay — the island's airport is seen atop the right-hand hill, whilst Ennor Castle was located at the small wooded hill towards the left.

- Location within Isles of Scilly
- OS grid reference: SV914102
- Civil parish: St Mary's
- Unitary authority: Isles of Scilly
- Ceremonial county: Cornwall
- Region: South West
- Country: England
- Sovereign state: United Kingdom
- Post town: ISLES OF SCILLY
- Postcode district: TR21
- Dialling code: 01720
- Police: Devon and Cornwall
- Fire: Isles of Scilly
- Ambulance: South Western
- UK Parliament: St Ives

Old Town (Cornish: Treveglos "church town") is a village on St Mary's in the Isles of Scilly located southeast of Hugh Town. It is thought to be the oldest settlement on the island.

It is a popular tourist area and is only a short distance from the island's airport. As well as a number of self-catering holiday properties, Old Town also has a large proportion of dwellings permanently occupied by local residents. The Five Islands School, as well as the main sports and fitness centre for St Mary's, is located just by Old Town, at the settlement of Carn Gwaval.

Old Town Bay (Cornish: Porth Treveglos) forms a natural harbour and links the village with the open sea; there is an old quay and there continues to be a slipway in use.

== History ==
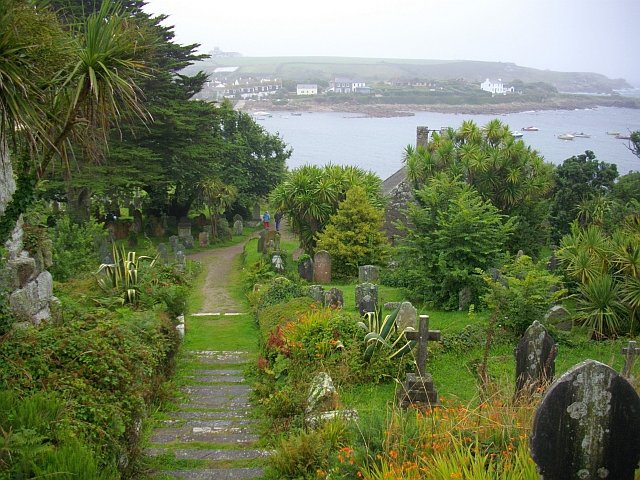
View of Old Town and the bay from the terraced graveyard; it is the resting place of many of those who have died in nearby shipwrecks.

In medieval times this was the main harbour, administrative centre and settlement of the Isles of Scilly. The island of St Mary's was then known as Ennor, and the Old Town was named Porth Ennor or Porthenor (being the main harbour settlement of the island). It declined with the development of the Garrison and neighbouring Hugh Town, which in turn replaced Old Town as the main harbour, administrative centre and settlement of the Isles.

== Amenities and landmarks ==
As well as being located close to the island's school and airport, within Old Town there is a small shop, a pub, two cafés, as well as three art studios located on the road leading north out of the village.

=== Ennor Castle ===
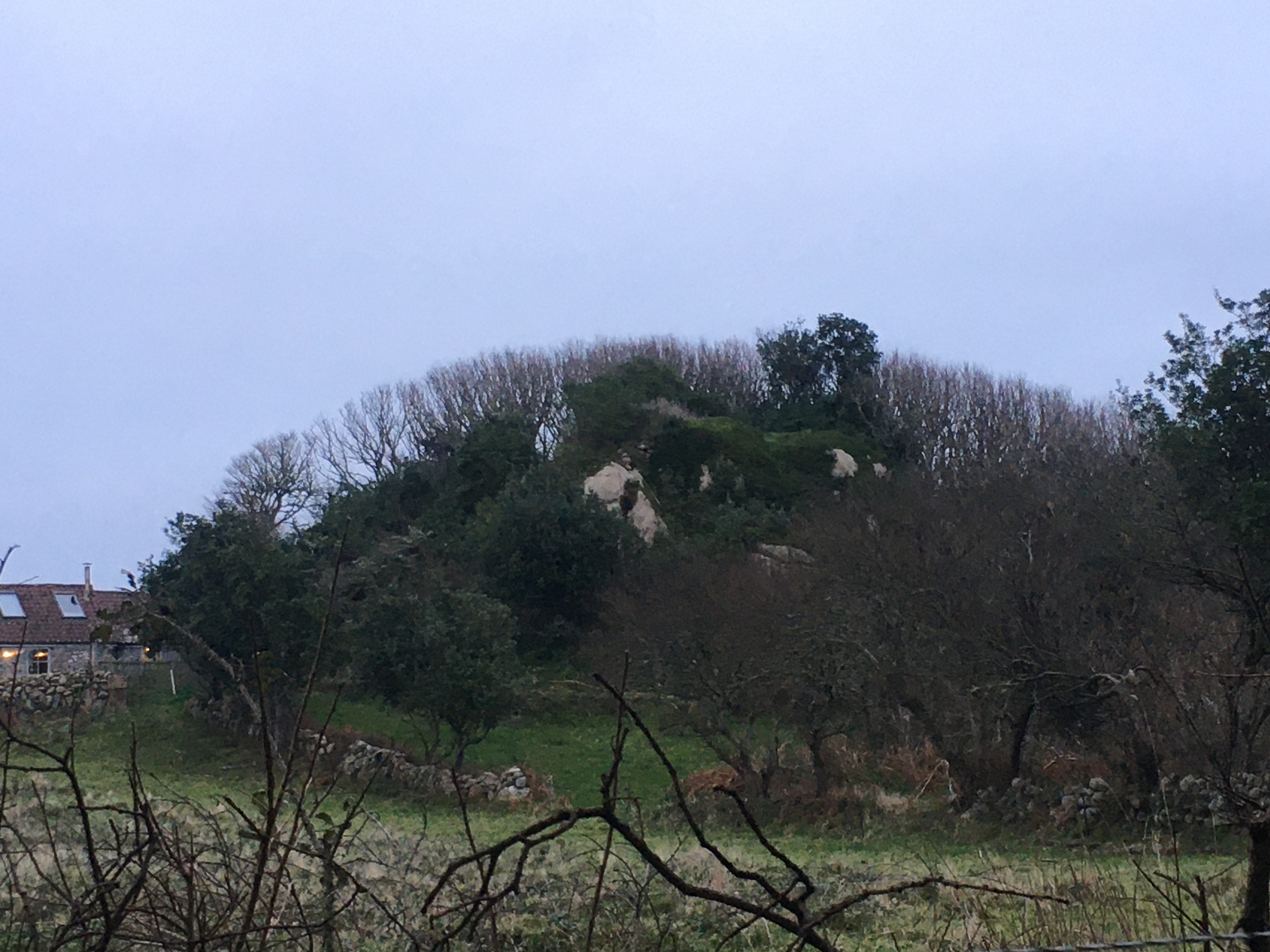
The knoll upon which the remains of Ennor Castle are located

On a small but prominent knoll are the fragmentary remains of a small shell keep castle dating from the thirteenth or fourteenth century, known as Ennor Castle, the only medieval castle on the islands. It became redundant after Star Castle, built on the Garrison, was built in the late sixteenth century. Some of the castle's stone was used to build Star Castle, with much of the rest robbed for buildings in Old Town. During 2014, overgrowth clearances were carried out, which made the castle far more visible. The project was supported by Natural England, English Heritage and the owners of the site.

=== Church ===
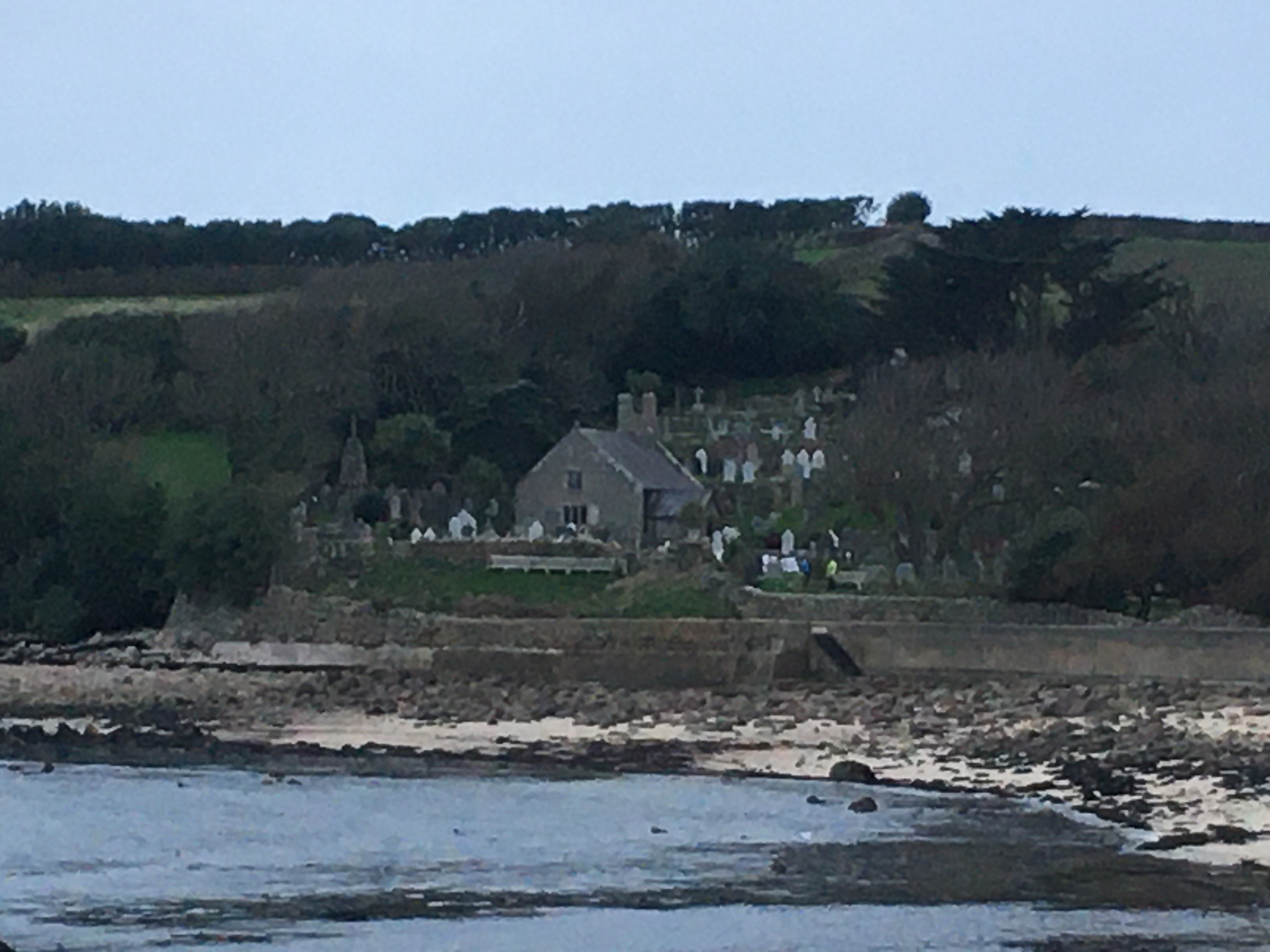
The church and churchyard from the other side of Old Town Bay

On the other side of the bay to the settlement lies St Mary's Old Church (commonly known as Old Town Church) which is surrounded by an old, terraced graveyard as well as the newer municipal cemetery. The dedication of the church to St Mary then gave that name to the island parish, replacing the older name of Ennor; the naming after the parish church is also the case with a number of other islands in Scilly. Common with other Cornish parishes, the church is located a little distance from the main settlement of the parish, and there once was a small churchtown surrounding the church; today however there are no other buildings in the vicinity of the church. The parish church of St Mary's is now in Hugh Town, also dedicated to St Mary the Virgin, though the Old Church is used for Sunday evening services (Easter-September) and the cemetery belonging to the Council of the Isles of Scilly lies adjacent.

== Notable residents ==
Former Prime Minister of the United Kingdom Harold Wilson was a regular visitor to the Isles of Scilly, and often stayed at Hugh Town in a bungalow named 'Lowenva'. He is buried in the cemetery at the church at Old Town.
