= Isles of Scilly Football League =

- Founded: 1910s
- Country: England (Cornwall)
- Divisions: 1
- Number of clubs: 2
- Domestic cups: Wholesalers Cup; Foredeck Cup; Charity Shield; Galley Cup; Scillonian Club Cup; Lyonnese Cup (Invitational)
- Current champions: Woolpack Wanderers (17th title) (2024–25)
- Most championships: Garrison Gunners (20 titles)

The Isles of Scilly Football League is the official football league for the Isles of Scilly. The football league is the smallest in the world, with only two clubs.

The league is affiliated with The Football Association. However, since the league is not part of the English football pyramid, teams are not eligible to enter the FA Cup.

== History ==
In the 1920s, the Lyonnesse Inter-Island Cup, a competition between the islands of St. Mary's, Tresco, St. Martins, Bryher and St. Agnes, was formed. By the 1950s, only two clubs remained—the Rangers and the Rovers. In 1984 the two clubs changed their names to the Garrison Gunners and the Woolpack Wanderers, which are their current names.

In April 2008, Adidas ran an advertisement called "Dream Big", highlighting the league, featuring several well-known football personnel including David Beckham, Steven Gerrard and Patrick Vieira.

Since 2016, the league is recognised by the Guinness World Records as the "smallest affiliated football league" in the world.

In 2019 the football league tested Fan Assisted Refereeing (FAR) in association with Vodafone.

== Competition structure ==
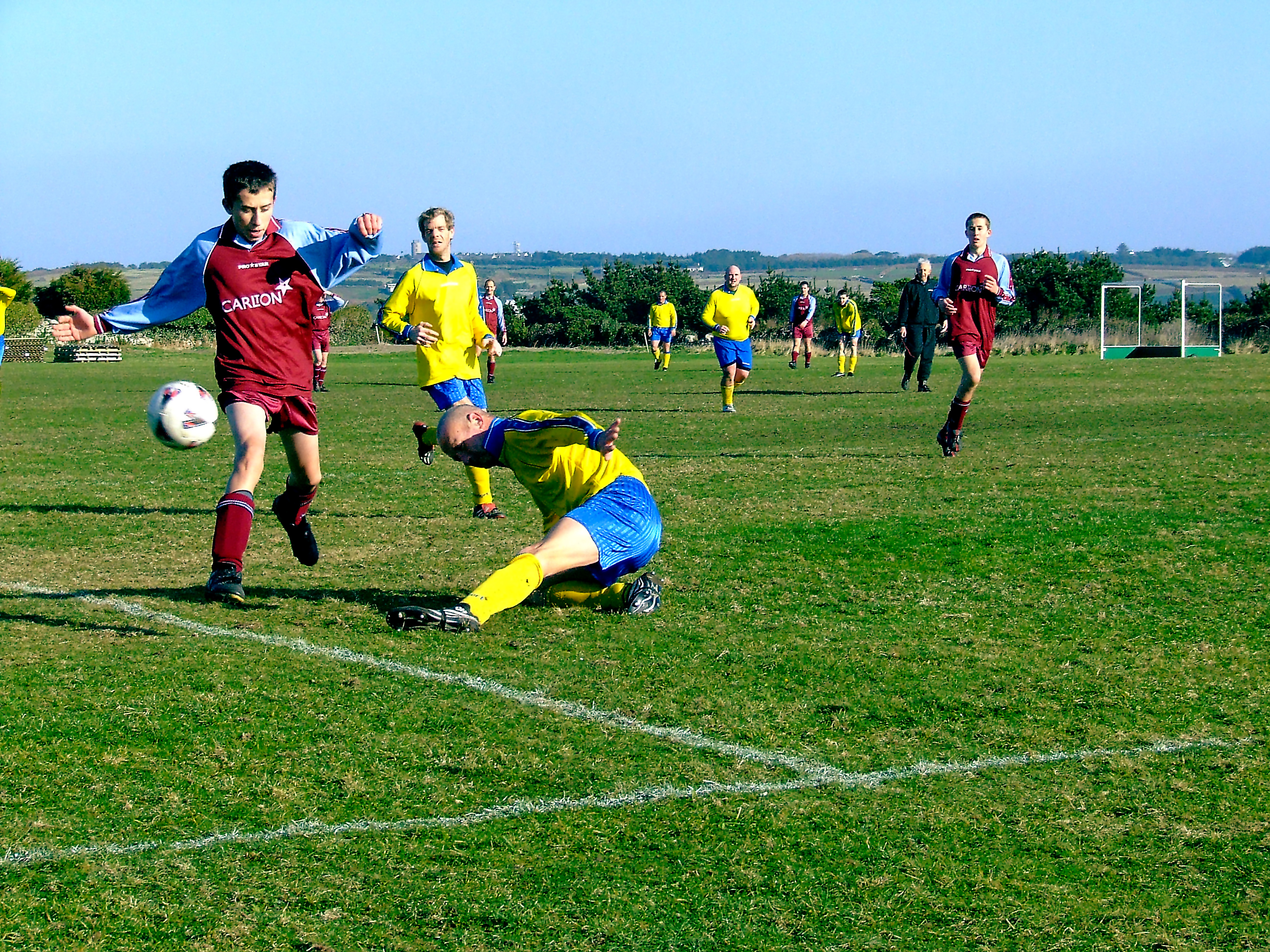
Game in progress between the two teams—the Garrison Gunners in yellow, and the Woolpack Wanderers in red.

The League competition involves the Woolpack Wanderers and the Garrison Gunners playing each other between fourteen and twenty times, often on a Sunday. Technically, the two teams are part of a single club, St Mary's Football Club. There also exist two Cups: The Wholesalers Cup and the Foredeck Cup, which is played over two legs. An "Old Men versus the Youngsters" match is played on Boxing Day. The season itself starts with the Charity Shield. All the matches are played on the Garrison football field, on the island of St. Mary's.

Team line-ups change at the start of each season. They are decided at a local pub before the first game, where footballers of the island appoint two captains, who then select their players one at a time.

The league is played during the winter, from October until March or April.

Occasionally, a combined Isles of Scilly team play Newlyn Non Athletico, a team at level 14 of the English football league system. A team from Truro used to visit annually to play against a combined team.

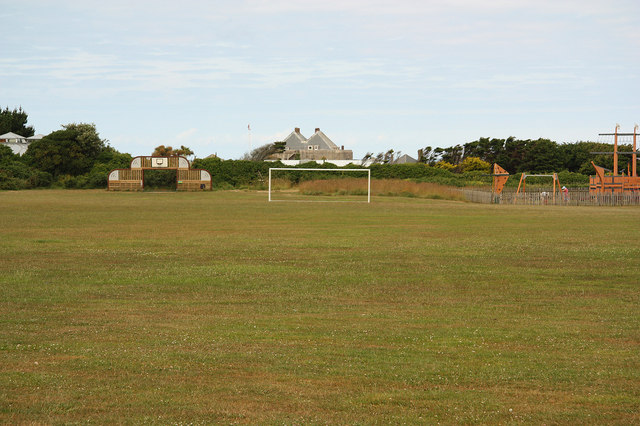
Garrison Field, where all official games are held

In 2012, the Lyonesse Cup was founded. It started as a 6 teams cup, before changing to an annual game with West Cornwall side Dynamo Choughs. After a several-year hiatus between 2015 and 2022, the cup returned in 2023. The winner is awarded a 6 millimetres trophy, nicknamed the "world's smallest cup". A replica is on display at the FIFA Museum in Zürich.

== Concerns ==
The Isles of Scilly are struggling to hold on to their young people. There is no sixth form on the Isles so when youngsters turn 16, they go to the mainland. In addition, house prices are expensive, so they tend not to return until much older. Between 2011 and 2021, population on the Isles of Scilly fell by 6.8%. As a result, the number of players in the league had been dwindling. In 2008 Howard Cole, a secretary who referees the games, estimated the average age of both teams to be within the mid- to late-30s. As of 2023, one player in his 70s still occasionally plays in official games.

Due to the league's nature on-duty firemen or policemen play in official games, occasionally leaving one team one-player short in case of an emergency.

Travelling to the Isles of Scilly is notoriously difficult and unpredictable due to frequent fog and storms, which means that including players living in mainland England is currently not a viable option.

== Champions (since 1991–92) ==
Season	Winners
1991–92	Woolpack Wanderers
1992–1994	not known
1994–95	Garrison Gunners
1995–99	not known
1999–2000	Garrison Gunners
2000–03	not known
2003–04	Garrison Gunners
2004–05	Garrison Gunners
2005–06	Woolpack Wanderers
2006–07	Woolpack Wanderers
2007–08	Garrison Gunners
2008–09	Garrison Gunners
2009–10	Woolpack Wanderers
2010–11	Woolpack Wanderers
2011–12	Garrison Gunners
2012–13	Woolpack Wanderers
2013–14	Garrison Gunners
2014–15	Garrison Gunners
2015–16	Garrison Gunners
2016–17	Garrison Gunners
2017–18	Garrison Gunners
2018–19	Garrison Gunners
2019–20	declared void
2020–21	Woolpack Wanderers
2021–22	Woolpack Wanderers
2022–23	Woolpack Wanderers
2023–24	Woolpack Wanderers
