= Philip Hygate =

Scillonian politician and farmer

Chief Executive of the Council of the Isles of Scilly
- In office 1992–2012

Chairman of the Isles of Scilly AONB Partnership
- Incumbent
- Assumed office 2012

Personal details
- Citizenship: United Kingdom

Philip Hygate is a Scillonian politician and farmer. He was the Chief Executive of the Council of the Isles of Scilly from 1992 to 2012 and has been the Chairman of the AONB partnership for the Isles since 2012.

== Biography ==
Hygate graduated school with degrees in politics and economic history. He held various positions, including working for the United Nations and European Union.

In 1992, Hygate was appointed as the Chief Executive of the Council of the Isles of Scilly, becoming the youngest person to hold the office. During his tenure, Hygate oversaw the construction of a new school on St Mary's, as well as preliminary plans for revitalization of the island's harbor and airport.

In 2012, the local council was criticized by the public because of an 18% pay raise for senior council officials, while regular council employees saw their wages frozen. The animosity of Scillonians towards council executives came to a head in May, when Hygate was involved in the suspension of a teacher at the Five Islands Academy. The elected chairman of the council, Mike Hicks, accused Hygate of overstepping his duties and not keeping the council informed of his actions. In October, Hicks informed Hygate that it was not possible for the two to continue working together, and began the process of removing Hygate as Chief Executive.

The original plan of the council was to appoint an independent investigator into the matter, as Hygate and the council could not agree on a candidate. However, before the 2 January deadline to appoint the investigator, the council and Hygate entered negotiations directly. On 30 October, it was agreed that Hygate would leave his position in a "mutual agreement" and be given severance pay of 80,000 pounds.

Following his separation, Hygate moved near the Tamar Valley AONB on the mainland and began farming. He became Chairman of the Isles of Scilly AONB Partnership, a position which he still held as of 2020.
