= Islands FM =

Radio station in the Isles of Scilly, England

Isles of Scilly; England
- Frequency: 107.9 MHz

Programming
- Format: Community radio

Ownership
- Owner: IslandsFM Ltd.

History
- First air date: 3 September 2007
- Former names: Radio Scilly (2007–2020)

Links
- Website: www.islandsfm.com

Islands FM, previously known as Radio Scilly, is a non-profit community radio station.

Originally launched as Radio Scilly in September 2007, the station broadcasts to the residents of the Isles of Scilly.

Radio Scilly rebranded as Islands FM on 31 January 2020.

== History ==
Radio Scilly was launched in September 2007, and was founded by Keri Jones, who had previously launched Radio Pembrokeshire.

In January 2016, Jones announced he would be leaving the station, and that his position would be taken up by his colleague Zoe Parry.

In January 2019, three months after Parry passed on ownership of the station to Beth and Steve Sims in October 2018, it was announced that Radio Scilly would be closing in March unless someone else took on ownership of the station, due to the management team no longer being able to run it.

On 31 January 2020, following a new set of directors taking ownership of the station, Radio Scilly rebranded as Islands FM, with the website, jingles, logo and music playlists also changing to reflect the rebrand and the audience demographics.

== Technical ==
It broadcasts on FM on 107.9 MHz from the existing radio mast by the Coastguard Tower at Telegraph on St. Mary's island. Most of the Isles of Scilly can be covered from this site.

It is one of the world's smallest radio stations, due to the small number of residents on the islands. Its licensed service area population is slightly larger than that of the UK's smallest licensed station Two Lochs Radio which broadcasts to an official service area population of just 1,681.

== Funding ==
The radio station is funded in part by a local weekly lottery, licensed by the Council for the Isles of Scilly. It costs £1 a week to enter and there are two weekly prizes (£500 and £250). The number of players is limited to 2,000 each week. Any money remaining after the prize has been paid goes towards the cost of running the station or to local clubs or organisations that request a grant.
