= Isles of Scilly =

Group of islands in Cornwall, England

Native name: Syllan
- Scillonian Cross flag

- The Isles of Scilly (red; bottom left corner) within Cornwall (light yellow)

Geography
- Location: 45 km (24 nmi) southwest of the Cornish peninsula
- Coordinates: 49.92°N 6.30°W; ISO Code: GB-IOS
- OS grid reference: SV8912
- Archipelago: British Isles
- Adjacent to: Celtic Sea; Atlantic Ocean
- Total islands: 5 inhabited, 140 others
- Major islands: St Mary's; Tresco; St Martin's; Bryher; St Agnes
- Area: 16 km^{2} (6.2 sq mi) (293rd)
- Highest elevation: 51 m (167 ft)
- Highest point: Telegraph

Administration
- United Kingdom
- Status: Sui generis unitary
- Country: England
- Region: South West
- Ceremonial county: Cornwall
- Capital and largest city: Hugh Town (pop. 948 2021 census.)
- Leadership: Joel Williams
- Chief executive: Russell Ashman
- MP: Andrew George (Lib Dem)

Demographics
- Demonym: Scillonian; Cornish
- Population: 2,299 (2025 · 296th)
- Pop. density: 141/km^{2} (365/sq mi)
- Languages: English, Cornish
- Ethnic groups: 93.7% White British; 3.7% Other White; 1.1% Mixed; 0.3% Asian; 0.2% Black; 0.9% Other groups

Additional information
- Official website: www.scilly.gov.uk

Ramsar Wetland
- Designated: 13 August 2001
- Reference no.: 1095

The Isles of Scilly (/ˈsɪl.i/, SIL-ee; Cornish: Syllan) are a small archipelago in Cornwall, England, approximately 45 km (28 mi) south-west of Land's End. One of the islands, St Agnes, is over four miles (six kilometres) further south than the most southerly point of the British mainland at Lizard Point, and has the southernmost inhabited settlement in Cornwall and the UK, Troy Town.

The total population of the islands at the 2021 United Kingdom census was 2,100. A majority live on one island, St Mary's, and close to half live in Hugh Town; the remainder live on four inhabited "off-islands".

People have lived on the islands since at least the Iron Age, and the Romans knew them as Sillina. Rising sea levels flooded low-lying land, and the islands were probably once much larger, possibly a single island. In the Middle Ages they belonged to Tavistock Abbey, which founded a priory on Tresco. During the English Civil War they were a Royalist base until Parliament captured them in 1651. In 1707, four Royal Navy ships were wrecked off the islands, and at least 1,450 people died. Most of the islands were held on lease, first by the Godolphin family and later by the Smith family, until 1920, when they passed back to the Duchy of Cornwall.

The islands are known for pilot gig racing, a rowing sport that began with crews racing to put pilots on ships. The World Pilot Gig Championships are held there every year over the May Day bank holiday weekend. The islands have what is reportedly the world's smallest football league. A 2006 survey found that residents were the most active in England for sport and fitness. Rock climbing and bouldering on the granite coast have been practised since 1977. The islands have also featured on television, including in the BBC series An Island Parish.

Scilly forms part of the ceremonial county of Cornwall and was historically one of the hundreds of Cornwall. Since 1890, the islands have had their own local authority, the Council of the Isles of Scilly, which is administratively separate from the mainland Cornwall Council, although some services are provided by it.

The adjective "Scillonian" is sometimes used for people or things related to the archipelago. The Duchy of Cornwall owns most of the freehold land on the islands. Tourism is a major part of the local economy along with agriculture, particularly the production of cut flowers.

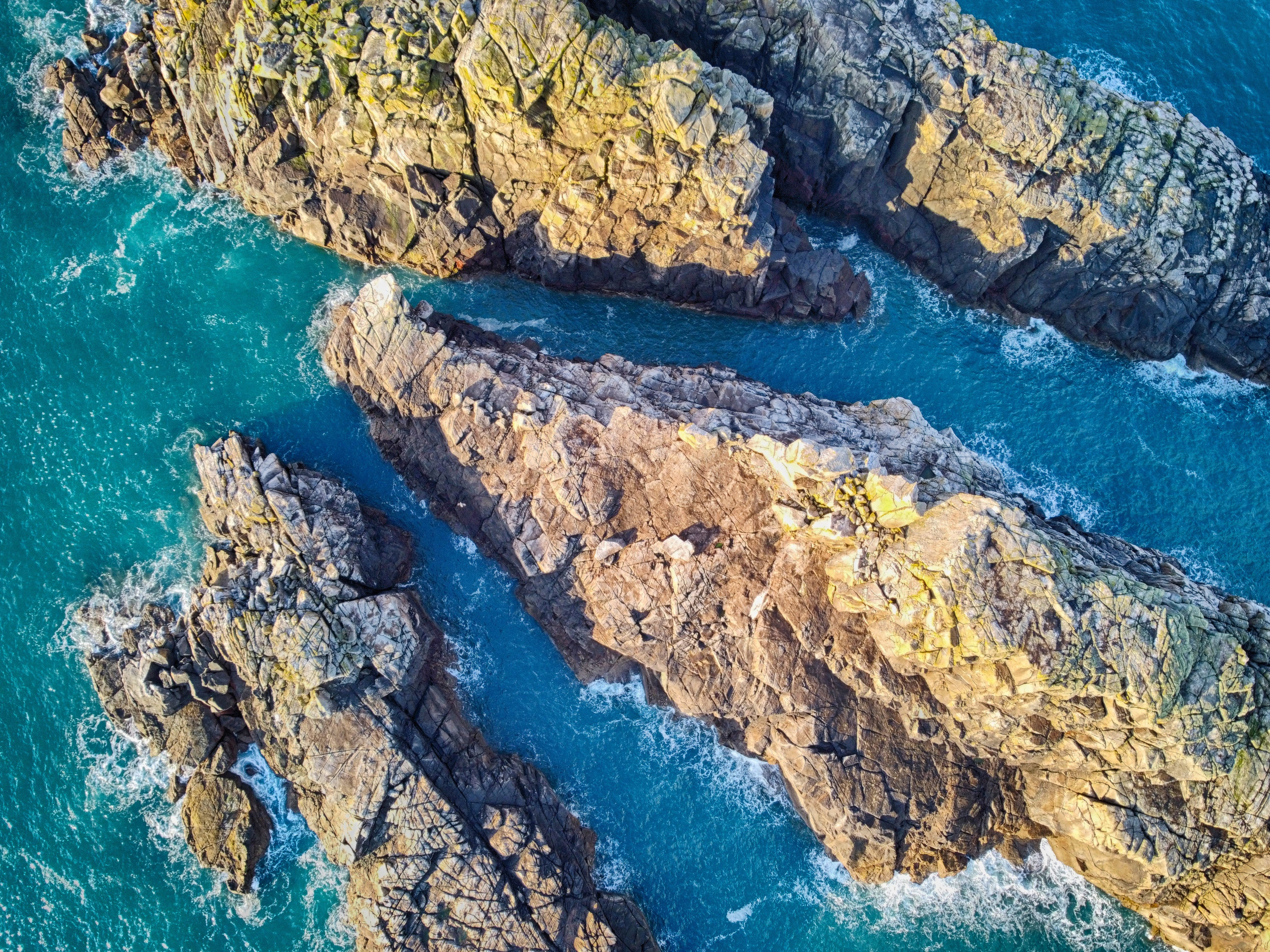
Men-a-Vaur in the Isles of Scilly

== Name ==
Scilly was known to the Romans as Sil(l)ina, a Latinisation of a Brittonic name that became Cornish Sillan, or Syllan in modern spelling. The name is of unknown origin, but has been speculatively linked to the goddess Sulis. The English name Scilly first appeared in 1176, in the form Sully. The unetymological c was added in the 16th century in order to distinguish the name from the word "silly", whose meaning was shifting at this time from "happy" to "foolish".

In French, they are called the Sorlingues, from Old Norse Syllingar (incorporating the suffix -ingr). Mercator used this name on his 1564 map of Britain, causing it to spread to several European languages.

== History ==
=== Early history ===
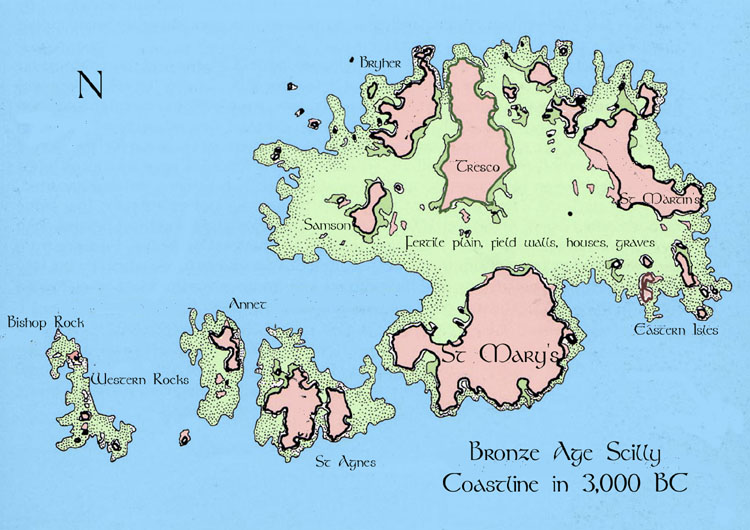
Projected coastline of the Isles of Scilly in 3,000 BCE, as supported by Barnett et al.

The islands may correspond to the Cassiterides ("Tin Isles"), believed by some to have been visited by the Phoenicians and mentioned by the Greeks. While Cornwall is an ancient tin-mining region, there is no evidence of this having taken place substantially on the islands.

During the Late Roman Empire, the islands may have been a place of exile. At least one person, one Tiberianus from Hispania, is known to have been condemned c. 385 to banishment on the isles, as well as the bishop Instantius, as part of the prosecution of the Priscillianists.

The isles were part of the Brittonic Celtic kingdom of Dumnonia. In the later Sub-Roman period, c. 7th century AD, the remaining Britons were split into three separate regions: the West (Cornwall), Wales and Cumbria–Ystrad Clyd (Strathclyde). The isles may have been a part of these polities until a short-lived conquest, by the English, in the 10th century was cut short by the Norman Conquest.

It is likely that, until relatively recent times, the islands were much larger, and perhaps conjoined into one island named Ennor. Rising sea levels flooded the central plain around 400–500 AD, forming the current 55 islands and islets (if an island is defined as "land surrounded by water at high tide and supporting land vegetation"). The word Ennor is a contraction of the Old Cornish En Noer (Doer, mutated to Noer), meaning 'the land' or 'the great island'.

Evidence for the older, large island includes:

- A description, written during Ancient Roman times, designates Scilly "Scillonia insula" in the singular, indicating either a single island or an island much bigger than any of the others.
- Remains of a prehistoric farm have been found on Nornour (now a small, rocky skerry far too small for farming). There once was an Iron Age British community here that continued into Roman times. This community was likely formed by immigrants from Brittany—probably the Veneti—who were active in the tin trade that originated in mining activity in Cornwall and Devon.
- At certain low tides, the sea becomes shallow enough for people to walk between some of the islands. This is possibly one of the sources for stories of "drowned lands", e.g. Lyonesse.
- Ancient field walls are visible below the high tideline off some of the islands, such as Samson.
- Some of the Cornish-language place names also appear to reflect historical shorelines and former land areas.
- The whole of southern England has been steadily sinking, in opposition to post-glacial rebound in Scotland: this has caused the rias (drowned river valleys) on the southern Cornish coast, e.g. River Fal and the Tamar Estuary.

Offshore, midway between Land's End and the Isles of Scilly, is the supposed location of the mythical lost land of Lyonesse, referred to in Arthurian literature (of which Tristan is said to have been a prince). This may be a folk memory of inundated lands, but this legend is also common among the Brythonic peoples; the legend of Ys is a parallel and cognate legend in Brittany, as is that of Cantre'r Gwaelod in Wales.

=== Norse and Norman period ===
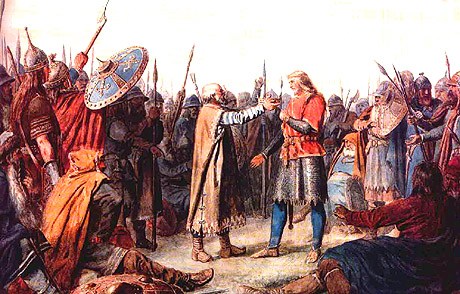
Olaf Tryggvason, who visited the islands in 986. It is said an encounter with a cleric there led him to Christianise Norway.

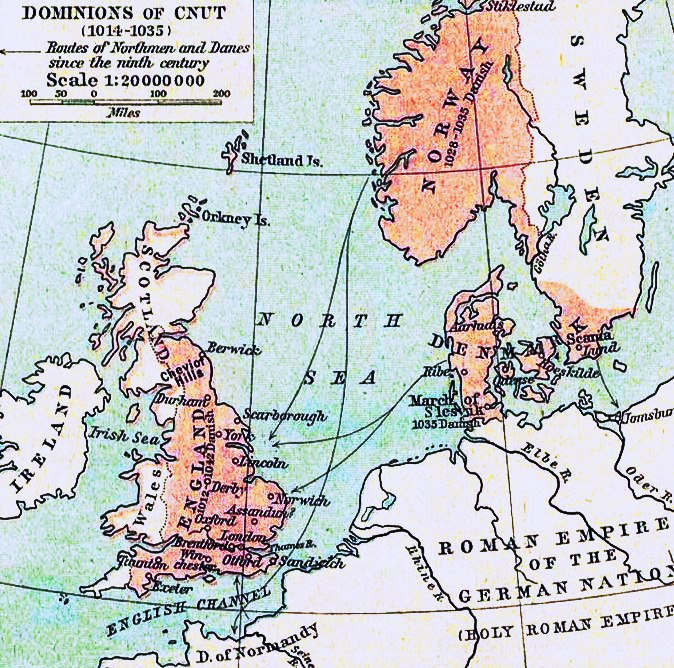
At the time of King Cnut, Cornwall and Wales fell outside England's rule.

In 995, Olaf Tryggvason became King Olaf I of Norway. Born c. 960, Olaf had raided various European cities and fought in several wars. In 986 he met a Christian seer on the Isles of Scilly. He was probably a follower of Priscillian and part of the tiny Christian community that was exiled here from Spain by Emperor Maximus for Priscillianism. In Snorri Sturluson's Royal Sagas of Norway, it is stated that this seer told him:

Thou wilt become a renowned king, and do celebrated deeds. Many men wilt thou bring to faith and baptism, and both to thy own and others' good; and that thou mayst have no doubt of the truth of this answer, listen to these tokens. When thou comest to thy ships many of thy people will conspire against thee, and then a battle will follow in which many of thy men will fall, and thou wilt be wounded almost to death, and carried upon a shield to thy ship; yet after seven days thou shalt be well of thy wounds, and immediately thou shalt let thyself be baptised.

The legend continues that, as the seer foretold, Olaf was attacked by a group of mutineers upon returning to his ships. As soon as he had recovered from his wounds, he let himself be baptised. He then stopped raiding Christian cities, and lived in England and Ireland. In 995, he used an opportunity to return to Norway. When he arrived, the Haakon Jarl was facing a revolt. Olaf Tryggvason persuaded the rebels to accept him as their king, and Jarl Haakon was murdered by his own slave, while he was hiding from the rebels in a pig sty.

With the Norman Conquest, the Isles of Scilly came more under centralised Norman control. About 20 years later, the Domesday survey was conducted. The islands would have formed part of the "Exeter Domesday" circuit, which included Cornwall, Devon, Dorset, Somerset, and Wiltshire.

In the mid-12th century, there was reportedly a Viking attack on the Isles of Scilly, called Syllingar by the Norse, recorded in the Orkneyinga saga—Sweyn Asleifsson "went south, under Ireland, and seized a barge belonging to some monks in Syllingar and plundered it." (Chap LXXIII)

... the three chiefs—Swein, Þorbjörn and Eirik—went out on a plundering expedition. They went first to the Suðreyar [Hebrides], and all along the west to the Syllingar, where they gained a great victory in Maríuhöfn on Columba's-mass [9 June], and took much booty. Then they returned to the Orkneys.

"Maríuhöfn" literally means "Mary's Harbour/Haven". The name does not make it clear if it referred to a harbour on a larger island than today's St Mary's, or a whole island.

It is generally considered that Cornwall, and possibly the Isles of Scilly, came under the dominion of the English Crown for a period until the Norman conquest, late in the reign of Æthelstan (r. 924–939). In early times one group of islands was in the possession of a confederacy of hermits. King Henry I (r. 1100–1135) gave it to the abbey of Tavistock who established a priory on Tresco, which was abolished at the Reformation.

=== Later Middle Ages and early modern period ===
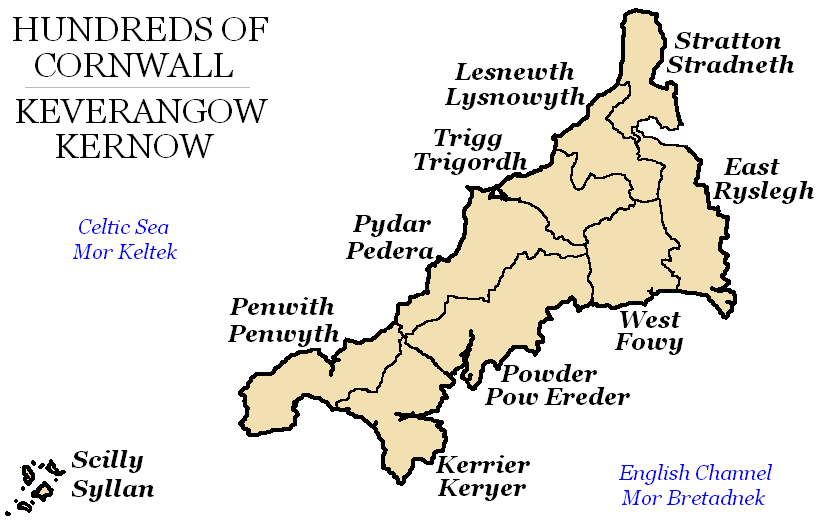
Scilly was one of the Hundreds of Cornwall (formerly known as Cornish Shires) in the early 19th century.

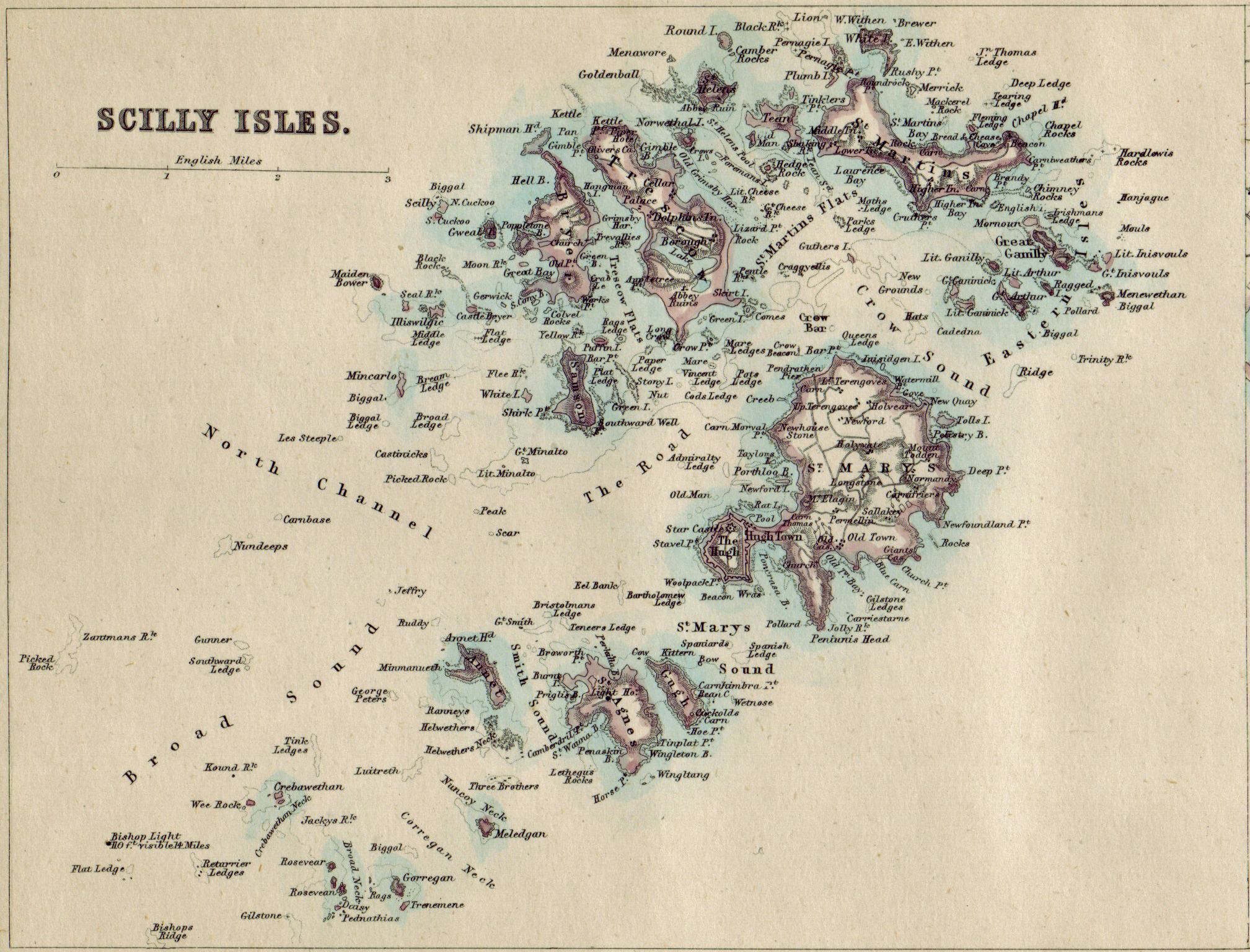
Scilly Isles: map by John Bartholomew (1874)

At the turn of the 14th century, the Abbot and convent of Tavistock Abbey petitioned the king,

stat[ing] that they hold certain isles in the sea between Cornwall and Ireland, of which the largest is called Scilly, to which ships come passing between France, Normandy, Spain, Bayonne, Gascony, Scotland, Ireland, Wales and Cornwall: and, because they feel that in the event of a war breaking out between the kings of England and France, or between any of the other places mentioned, they would not have enough power to do justice to these sailors, they ask that they might exchange these islands for lands in Devon, saving the churches on the islands appropriated to them.

William le Poer, coroner of Scilly, is recorded in 1305 as being worried about the extent of wrecking in the islands, and sending a petition to the King. The names provide a wide variety of origins, e.g. Robert and Henry Sage (English), Richard de Tregenestre (Cornish), Ace de Veldre (French), Davy Gogch (possibly Welsh, or Cornish), and Adam le Fuiz Yaldicz (possibly Spanish).

It is not known at what point the islanders stopped speaking the Cornish language, but the language seems to have gone into decline in Cornwall beginning in the Late Middle Ages; it was still dominant between the islands and Bodmin at the time of the Reformation, but it suffered an accelerated decline thereafter. The islands appear to have lost the old Brythonic (Celtic P) language before parts of Penwith on the mainland, in contrast to its Welsh sister language. Cornish is not directly linked to Irish, Scottish Gaelic or Manx, which fall into the Celtic Q group of languages.

During the English Civil War, the Parliamentarians captured the isles, only to see their garrison mutiny and return the isles to the Royalists. By 1651 the Royalist governor, Sir John Grenville, was using the islands as a base for privateering raids on Commonwealth and Dutch shipping. The Dutch admiral Maarten Tromp sailed to the isles and on arriving on 30 May 1651 demanded compensation. In the absence of compensation or a satisfactory reply, he declared war on England in June. It was during this period that the disputed Three Hundred and Thirty Five Years' War started between the isles and the Netherlands.

In June 1651, Admiral Robert Blake recaptured the isles for the Parliamentarians. Blake's initial attack on Old Grimsby failed, but the next attacks succeeded in taking Tresco and Bryher. Blake placed a battery on Tresco to fire on St Mary's, but one of the guns exploded, killing its crew and injuring Blake. A second battery proved more successful. Subsequently, Grenville and Blake negotiated terms that permitted the Royalists to surrender honourably. The Parliamentary forces then set to fortifying the islands. They built Cromwell's Castle—a gun platform on the west side of Tresco—using materials scavenged from an earlier gun platform further up the hill. Although this poorly sited earlier platform dated back to the 1550s, it is now referred to as King Charles's Castle.

The Isles of Scilly served as a place of exile during the English Civil War. Among those exiled there was Unitarian Jon Biddle.

During the night of 22 October 1707, the isles were the scene of one of the worst maritime disasters in British history, when out of a fleet of 21 Royal Navy ships headed from Gibraltar to Portsmouth, six were driven onto the cliffs. Four of the ships sank or capsized, with at least 1,450 dead, including the commanding admiral Sir Cloudesley Shovell.

There is evidence of inundation by the tsunami caused by the 1755 Lisbon earthquake.

== Geography ==
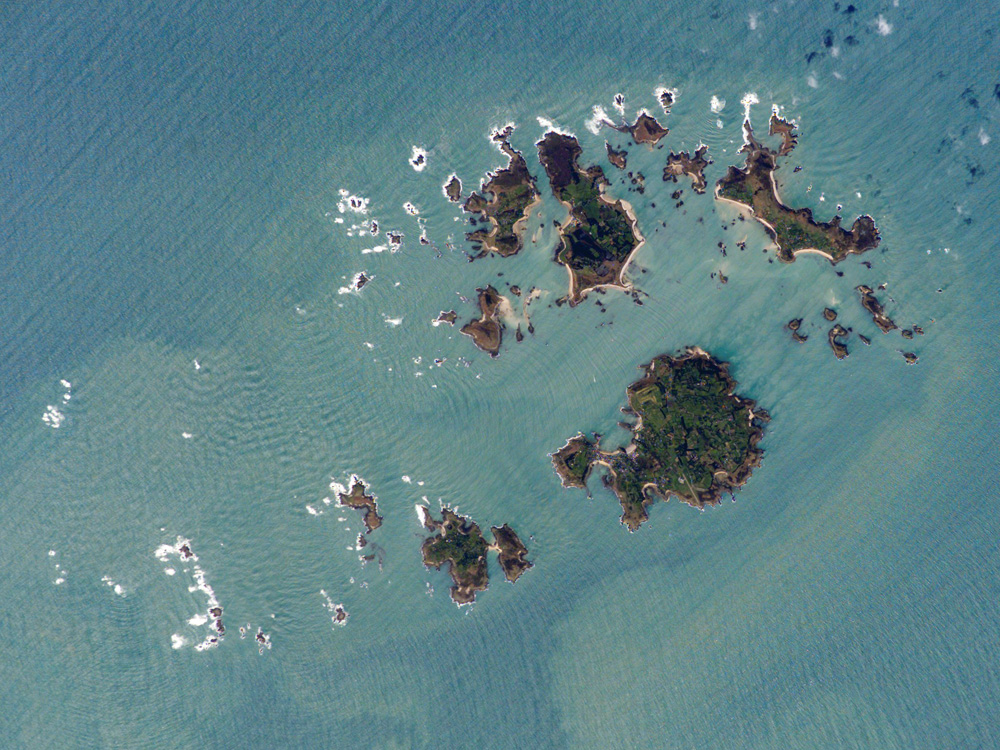
The Isles of Scilly, viewed from the International Space Station

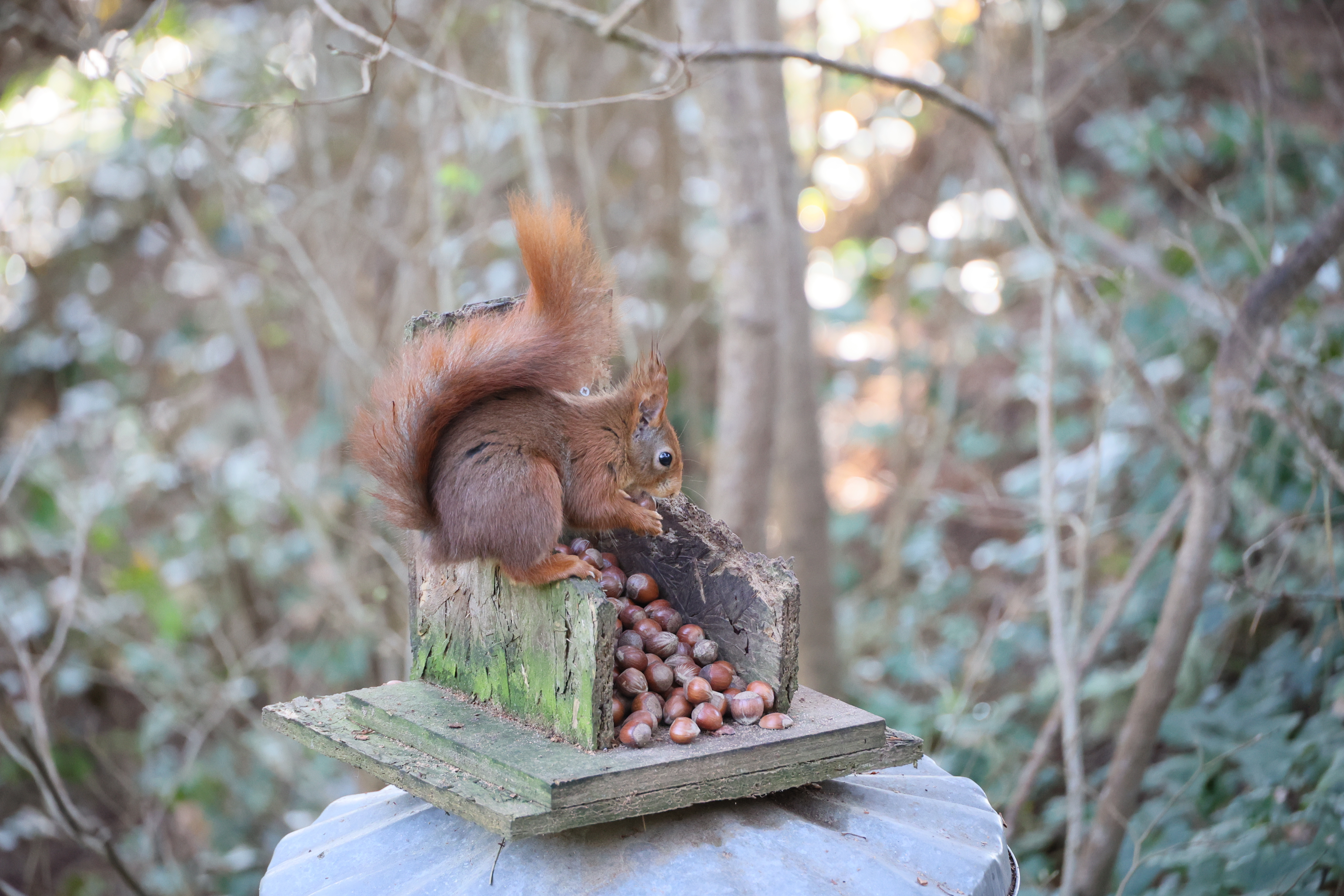
Red squirrel foraging in woodland habitat on Tresco

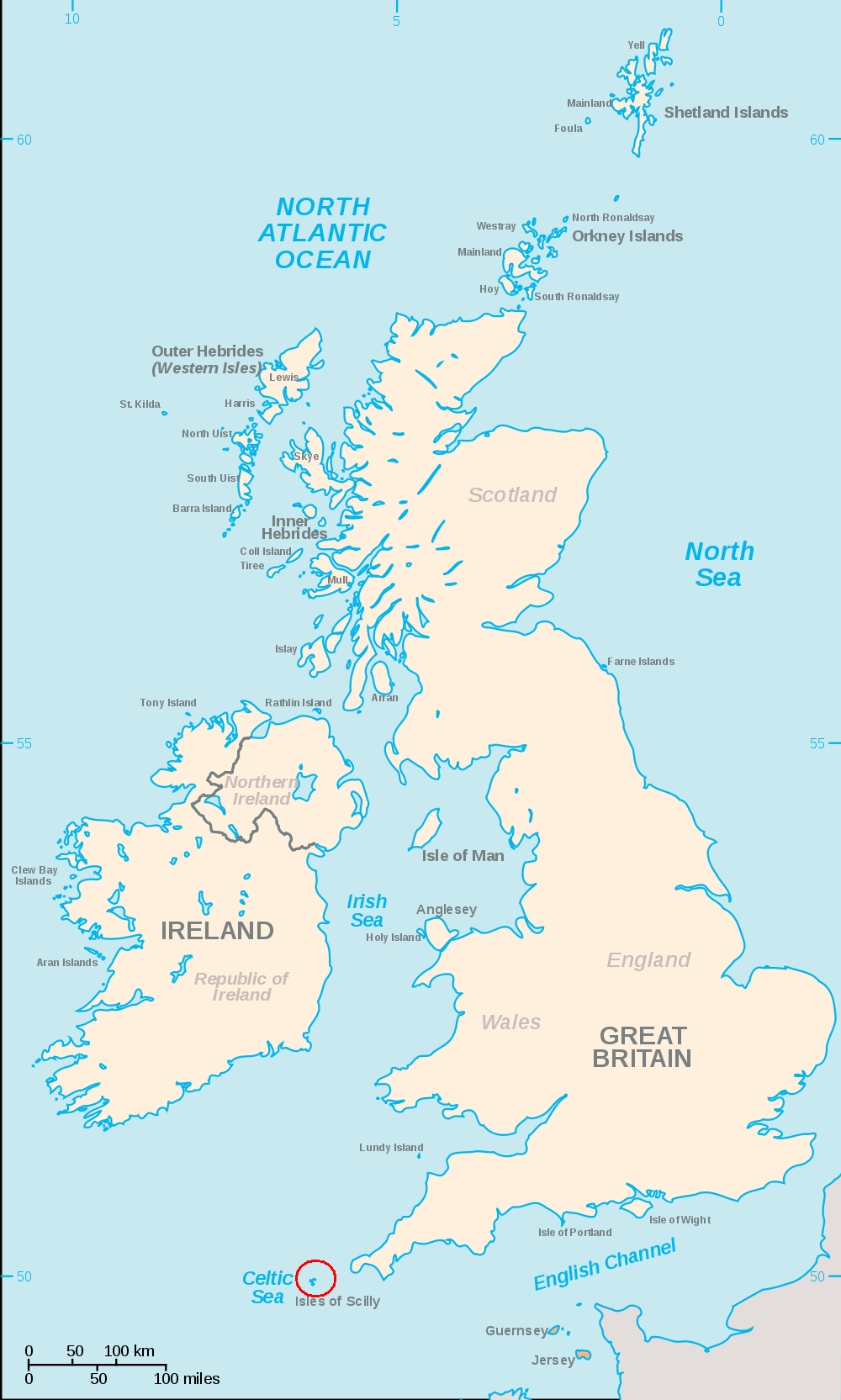
Location of the Isles of Scilly (circled)

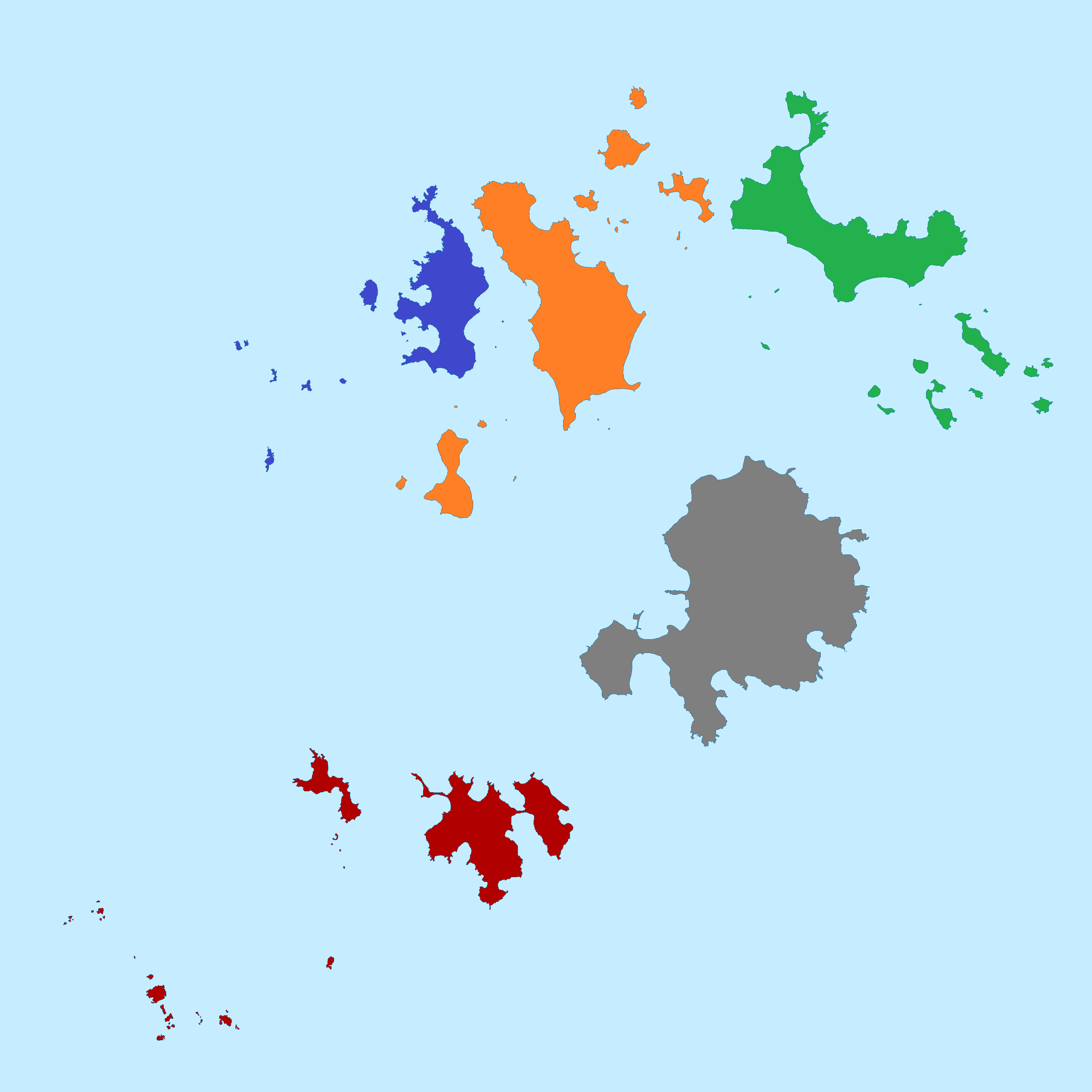
The five wards (which are also the civil parishes) of the Isles of Scilly; red is St Agnes, blue is Bryher, orange is Tresco, green is St Martin's, and grey is St Mary's.

The Isles of Scilly form an archipelago of five inhabited islands (six if Gugh is counted separately from St Agnes) and numerous other small rocky islets (around 140 in total) lying 45 kilometres (24 1/2 nautical miles) off Land's End. Troy Town Farm (Troytown Farm) on the southern part of the southernmost inhabited isle, St Agnes, is the southernmost settlement of the United Kingdom.

The islands' position produces a place of great contrast; the ameliorating effect of the sea, greatly influenced by the North Atlantic Current, means they rarely have frost or snow, which allows local farmers to grow flowers well ahead of those in mainland Britain. The chief agricultural product is cut flowers, mostly daffodils. Exposure to Atlantic winds also means that spectacular winter gales lash the islands from time to time. This is reflected in the landscape, most clearly seen on Tresco where the lush Abbey Gardens on the sheltered southern end of the island contrast with the low heather and bare rock sculpted by the wind on the exposed northern end.

Natural England has designated the Isles of Scilly as National Character Area 158. As part of a 2002 marketing campaign, the plant conservation charity Plantlife chose sea thrift (Armeria maritima) as the "county flower" of the islands.

Island	Population (Census 2001)	Area		Density		Main settlement
Island	Population (Census 2001)	km^{2}	sq mi	per km^{2}	per sq mi	Main settlement
St Mary's	1,666	6.58	2.54	253.2	656	Hugh Town
Tresco	180	2.97	1.15	60.6	157	New Grimsby
St Martin's (with White Island)	142	2.37	0.92	60.0	155	Higher Town
St Agnes (with Gugh)	73	1.48	0.57	49.3	128	Middle Town
Bryher (with Gweal)	92	1.32	0.51	70.0	181	The Town
Samson	–^{(1)}	0.38	0.15	-		
Annet	–	0.21	0.08	-		
St. Helen's	–	0.20	0.08	-		
Teän	–	0.16	0.06	-		
Great Ganilly	–	0.13	0.05	-		
Remaining 45 islets	–	0.57	0.22	-		
Isles of Scilly	2,153	16.37	6.32			Hugh Town

^{(1)} Inhabited until 1855.

In 1975 the islands were designated as an Area of Outstanding Natural Beauty. The designation covers the entire archipelago, including the uninhabited islands and rocks, and is the smallest such area in the UK. The islands of Annet and Samson have large terneries and the islands are well populated by seals. The Isles of Scilly are the only British habitat of the lesser white-toothed shrew (Crocidura suaveolens), where it is known locally as a "teak" or "teke".

=== Place names ===
The Cornish language was the main language of the islands until the 1700s, which is reflected in many of the islands' place names:

- Bryher - from Cornish breyer "place of hills"
- Bishop Rock - an English translation of the 14th century Cornish name Men an Epscop "the bishop's stone".
- Crebawethan - from Cornish creeb a wethan "reef with a tree".
- Ganilly - from Cornish guen hily "saltwater downs"
- Ganinick - from Cornish (an) geninack "the place of wild garlic"
- Gugh - from Cornish keow "hedge-banks"
- Gweal - recorded as Gwithiall in the 17th century, from Cornish gwethiall "place of trees"
- Helvear - recorded as Hayle Veor in the 16th century, from Cornish heyl veur "great estuary/tidings"
- Illiswilgig - from Cornish ennis welgack "grassy island"
- Menawethan - from Cornish men an wedhen "the tree stone"
- Peninnis - from Cornish penn enys "the end of the island"
- Porth Hellick - from Cornish porth helack "cove of willows"
- St Agnes - recorded in the 12th century as Aganas, from early Celtic ek enes "off-island". "Saint" was added later.
- St Martin's - recorded in the 14th century as Breghyek "dappled one", before taking the name of its church's patron saint.
- St Mary's - known as Ennor (an nor "the land") before the island took the name of its church's patron saint.
- Trenoweth - from Cornish tre noweth "new town"
- Tresco - from Cornish tre skaw "farm by elder trees", recorded in the 13th century for a holding and later applied to the whole island.

=== Tidal influx ===
The tidal range at the Isles of Scilly is high for an open sea location; the maximum for St Mary's is 5.99 m (19 ft 8 in). Additionally, the inter-island waters are mostly shallow, which at spring tides allows for dry land walking between several of the islands. Many of the northern islands can be reached from Tresco, including Bryher, Samson and St Martin's (requires very low tides). From St Martin's White Island, Little Ganilly and Great Arthur are reachable. Although the sound between St Mary's and Tresco, The Road, is fairly shallow, it never becomes totally dry, but according to some sources it should be possible to wade at extreme low tides. Around St Mary's several minor islands become accessible, including Taylor's Island on the west coast and Tolls Island on the east coast. From Saint Agnes, Gugh becomes accessible at each low tide, via a tombolo.

=== Climate ===
Depending on the classification system used, the Isles of Scilly have an oceanic (Köppen: Cfb) or humid subtropical (Trewartha: Cflk) climate. The average annual temperature is 12.0 °C (53.6 °F), the warmest place in the British Isles. Winters are, by far, the warmest in the UK due to the moderating effects of the North Atlantic Drift of the Gulf Stream. Despite being on exactly the same latitude as Winnipeg in Canada, snow and frost are extremely rare. The maximum snowfall was 23 cm (9 in) on 12 January 1987.

The climate has mild winters and cool summers, moderated by the Atlantic Ocean, thus summer temperatures are not as warm as on the mainland. However, the Isles are one of the sunniest areas in the southwest with an average of seven hours per day in May. The lowest temperature ever recorded was −7.2 °C (19.0 °F) and the highest was 27.8 °C (82.0 °F). The isles have never recorded a temperature below freezing in the months from May to November inclusive. Precipitation (the overwhelming majority of which is rain) averages about 35 in (890 mm) per year. The wettest months are from October to January, while April and May are the driest months.

Climate data for St Mary's Airport WMO ID: 03803; coordinates 49°54′52″N 6°17′45″W; elevation: 10 m (33 ft); 1991–2020 normals, extremes 1930-
Month	Jan	Feb	Mar	Apr	May	Jun	Jul	Aug	Sep	Oct	Nov	Dec	Year
Record high °C (°F)	14.4 (57.9)	13.5 (56.3)	16.1 (61.0)	20.3 (68.5)	22.2 (72.0)	27.4 (81.3)	27.8 (82.0)	27.8 (82.0)	24.4 (75.9)	21.3 (70.3)	18.3 (64.9)	14.7 (58.5)	27.8 (82.0)
Mean daily maximum °C (°F)	9.9 (49.8)	10.0 (50.0)	10.9 (51.6)	12.6 (54.7)	14.7 (58.5)	17.3 (63.1)	19.3 (66.7)	19.7 (67.5)	18.3 (64.9)	15.0 (59.0)	12.2 (54.0)	10.6 (51.1)	14.2 (57.6)
Daily mean °C (°F)	8.2 (46.8)	8.2 (46.8)	8.8 (47.8)	10.1 (50.2)	12.1 (53.8)	14.7 (58.5)	16.6 (61.9)	17.0 (62.6)	15.7 (60.3)	12.9 (55.2)	10.5 (50.9)	8.9 (48.0)	12.0 (53.6)
Mean daily minimum °C (°F)	6.4 (43.5)	6.3 (43.3)	6.7 (44.1)	7.5 (45.5)	9.5 (49.1)	12.0 (53.6)	13.8 (56.8)	14.3 (57.7)	13.1 (55.6)	10.8 (51.4)	8.7 (47.7)	7.1 (44.8)	9.7 (49.5)
Record low °C (°F)	−7.2 (19.0)	−5.0 (23.0)	−2.3 (27.9)	−1.8 (28.8)	2.4 (36.3)	6.1 (43.0)	7.2 (45.0)	7.2 (45.0)	6.6 (43.9)	3.9 (39.0)	0.7 (33.3)	−2.2 (28.0)	−7.2 (19.0)
Average precipitation mm (inches)	93.2 (3.67)	75.6 (2.98)	57.4 (2.26)	49.6 (1.95)	47.6 (1.87)	50.4 (1.98)	68.5 (2.70)	76.8 (3.02)	71.1 (2.80)	89.0 (3.50)	100.0 (3.94)	100.1 (3.94)	879.3 (34.62)
Average precipitation days (≥ 1.0 mm)	15.1	13.3	11.7	10.3	8.6	8.7	8.8	10.3	9.6	13.8	15.6	15.9	141.8
Average relative humidity (%)	83	81	84	83	86	86	85	85	85	85	83	84	84
Average dew point °C (°F)	6 (43)	5 (41)	6 (43)	7 (45)	9 (48)	12 (54)	14 (57)	14 (57)	13 (55)	11 (52)	8 (46)	7 (45)	9 (49)
Mean monthly sunshine hours	58.3	83.4	131.6	195.2	220.6	211.0	205.0	196.6	165.1	116.9	72.1	52.1	1,707.9
Source 1: Met Office
Source 2: Starlings Roost Weather Time and Date

=== Geology ===
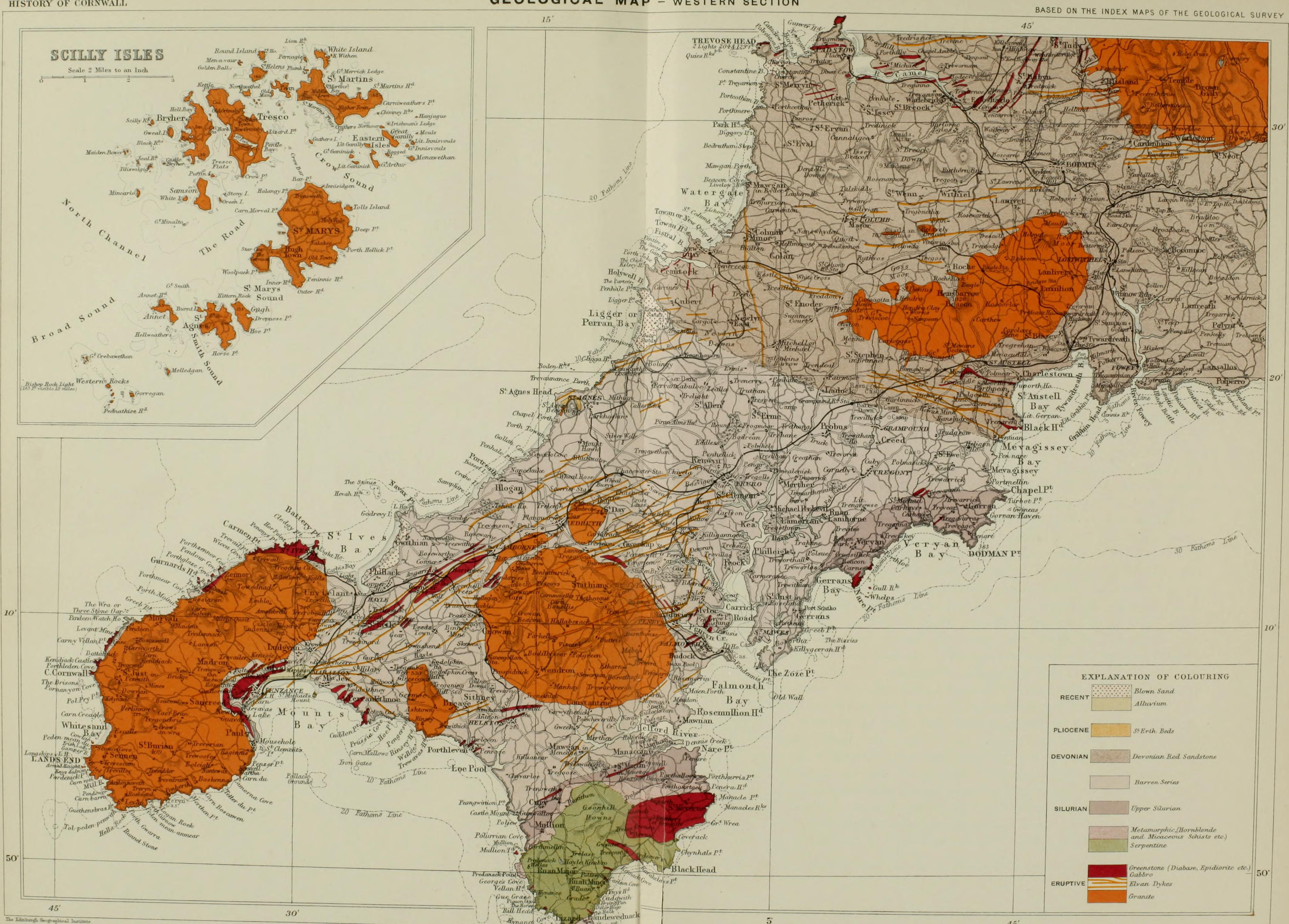
Geological map of western Cornwall, with the Isles of Scilly (inset)

All the islands of Scilly are all composed of granite rock of Early Permian age, an exposed part of the Cornubian batholith. The Irish Sea Glacier terminated just to the north of the Isles of Scilly during the last ice age.

=== Ancient monuments and historic buildings ===
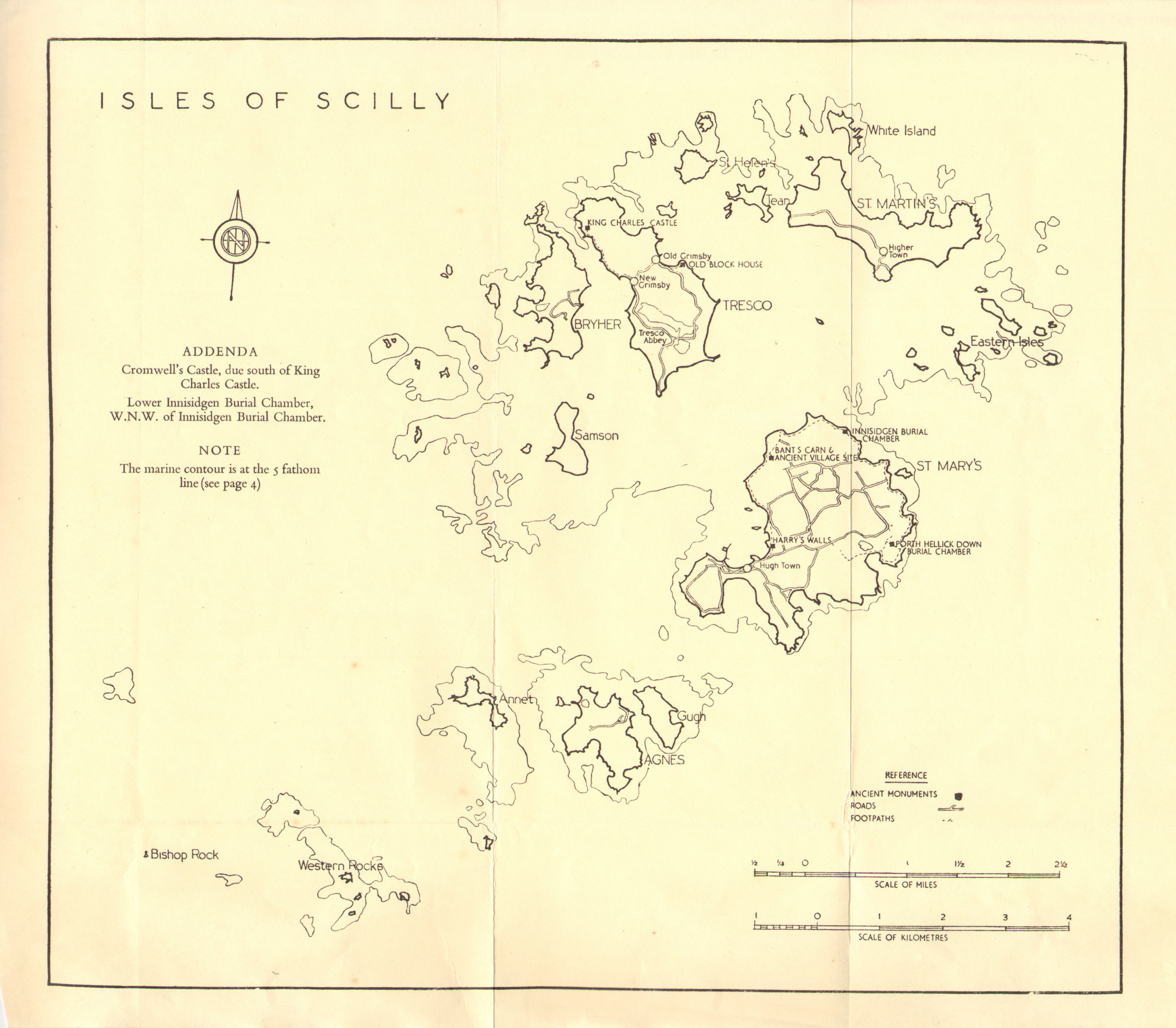
Map of ancient monuments on the Isles of Scilly

Historic sites on the Isles of Scilly include:

- Bant's Carn, a Bronze Age entrance grave
- Halangy Down Ancient Village
- Porth Hellick Down Burial Chamber
- Innisidgen Lower and Upper Burial Chambers
- The Old Blockhouse
- The St Agnes Troy Town (stone labyrinth)
- King Charles's Castle
- Harry's Walls, an unfinished artillery fort
- Garrison Tower
- Cromwell's Castle

== Flora ==
The Isles of Scilly have been a famous location for flower farming for centuries, and in that time horticultural flora has become a mainstay of the Scillonian economy. Due to the oceanic climate found on the Isles of Scilly the isles have the unique ability to grow a multitude of plants found around the world. Perhaps the most prominently grown flower on the Isles are the scented Narcissi or Narcissus, commonly known as the daffodil. There are flower farms on the isles of St. Agnes, St. Mary's, as well as St. Martin's and Bryher. The scented Narcissi are grown October through April, scented pinks or Dianthus are the second most notably grown flower on the isles which are in full bloom from May through September. Summer time on the Isles provides the temperate conditions for the blossom of many more types of plant. Bermuda Buttercup or Oxalis pes-caprae are very often found growing in bulb fields. In early summer, Digitalis colloquially known as foxgloves grow amongst hedgerows and bramble.

Other common sprouting plants throughout the summer season include:

- Ixia maculata
- Iris pseudacorus
- Lythrum salicaria
- Oenanthe crocata

In saturated areas you might observe:

- Lysimachia tenella, syn. Anagallis tenella
- Mentha aquatica
- Stellaria alsine
- Triadenum

Hedgerows were planted a century ago as windbreaks to protect the crop fields and to survive battering from storms and sea spray. To thrive there, plants need sturdy roots and the ability to withstand salt and gusty winds.

A many species of exotic plants have been brought in over the years including some trees; however there are still few remaining native tree species on the Isles of Scilly: these include elm, elder, hawthorn and grey sallow.

== Fauna ==
Scilly is situated far into the Atlantic Ocean, so many North American vagrant birds will make first European landfall in the archipelago. Scilly is responsible for many firsts for Britain, and is particularly good at producing vagrant American passerines. The islands are famous among birdwatchers for the large variety of rare and migratory birds that visit the islands, and when an extremely rare bird turns up, the islands see a significant increase in numbers of birders. The peak time of year for sightings is generally in the autumn.

=== Important Bird Area ===
The archipelago has been designated an Important Bird Area (IBA) by BirdLife International because it supports breeding populations of several species of seabirds, including European storm-petrels, European shags, lesser and great black-backed gulls, and common terns. Ruddy turnstones visit in winter.

== Government ==
The Scillonian Cross, the flag of the Isles of Scilly.

Saint Piran's Cross, the flag of Cornwall. The Isles of Scilly were one of the Hundreds of Cornwall, and although they have been administratively separate since 1890, they are still part of the ceremonial county of Cornwall.

=== Governors of Scilly ===
Historically, the Isles of Scilly were primarily ruled by a Proprietor/Governor. The governor was a military commission made by the monarch in consultation with the Admiralty in recognition of the islands' strategic position. The office of Governor was pre-eminent in military law but not in civil law, where the magistracy was vested in the Proprietor, who had a leasehold from the Duchy of Cornwall of the islands' land area. Usually the Proprietor served as Governor, although, according to Robert Heath, a Major Bennett was Governor for a short time before Proprietor Francis Godolphin, 2nd Earl of Godolphin was commissioned on 7 July 1733. The Proprietor/Governor was non-resident, delegating the military functions to a Lieutenant-Governor and the civil functions to a Council of twelve residents.

An early governor of Scilly was Thomas Godolphin, whose son Francis received a lease on the Isles in 1568. The Godolphins and their Osborne relatives held this position until 1831, when George Osbourne, 6th Duke of Leeds surrendered the lease to the islands, with them then returning to direct rule from the Duchy of Cornwall. In 1834 Augustus Smith acquired the lease from the Duchy for £20,000, and created the title Lord Proprietor of the Isles of Scilly. The lease remained in his family until it expired for most of the Isles in 1920 when ownership reverted to back to the Duchy of Cornwall. Today, the Dorrien-Smith family still holds the lease for the island of Tresco.

=== National government ===
Politically, the islands are part of England, one of the four countries of the United Kingdom. They are represented in the UK Parliament as part of the St Ives constituency. As part of the United Kingdom, the islands were part of the European Union and were represented in the European Parliament as part of the multi-member South West England constituency.

=== Local government ===
Historically, the Isles of Scilly were administered as one of the hundreds of Cornwall, although the Cornwall quarter sessions had limited jurisdiction there. For judicial purposes, shrievalty purposes, and lieutenancy purposes, the Isles of Scilly are "deemed to form part of the county of Cornwall".

The Local Government Act 1888 allowed the Local Government Board to establish in the Isles of Scilly "councils and other local authorities separate from those of the county of Cornwall"... "for the application to the islands of any act touching local government." Accordingly, in 1890 the Isles of Scilly Rural District Council (the RDC) was formed as a sui generis unitary authority, outside the administrative county of Cornwall. Cornwall County Council provided some services to the Isles, for which the RDC made financial contributions. The Isles of Scilly Order 1930 granted the council the "powers, duties and liabilities" of a county council. Section 265 of the Local Government Act 1972 allowed for the continued existence of the RDC, but renamed as the Council of the Isles of Scilly. This unusual status also means that much administrative law (for example relating to the functions of local authorities, the health service and other public bodies) that applies in the rest of England applies in modified form in the islands.

With a total population of just over 2,000, the council represents fewer inhabitants than many English parish councils, and is by far the smallest English unitary council. As of 2015, 130 people are employed full-time by the council to provide local services (including water supply and air traffic control). These numbers are significant, in that almost 10% of the adult population of the islands is directly linked to the council, as an employee or a councillor.

The Council consists of 16 elected councillors, 12 of whom are returned by the ward of St Mary's, and one from each of four "off-island" wards (St Martin's, St Agnes, Bryher, and Tresco). The latest elections took place on 1 May 2025; all candidates stood as independents, and only one seat (St Martin's) was contested.

The council is headquartered at Town Hall, by The Parade park in Hugh Town, and also performs the administrative functions of the AONB Partnership and the Inshore Fisheries and Conservation Authority.

Some aspects of local government are shared with Cornwall, including health, and the Council of the Isles of Scilly together with Cornwall Council form a Local Enterprise Partnership. In July 2015 a devolution deal was announced by the government under which Cornwall Council and the Council of the Isles of Scilly are to create a plan to bring health and social care services together under local control. The Local Enterprise Partnership is also to be bolstered. The islands are part of the Devon and Cornwall Police Force, and have voted in elections for the Devon and Cornwall Police and Crime Commissioner since the establishment of the post in 2012.

=== Flags ===
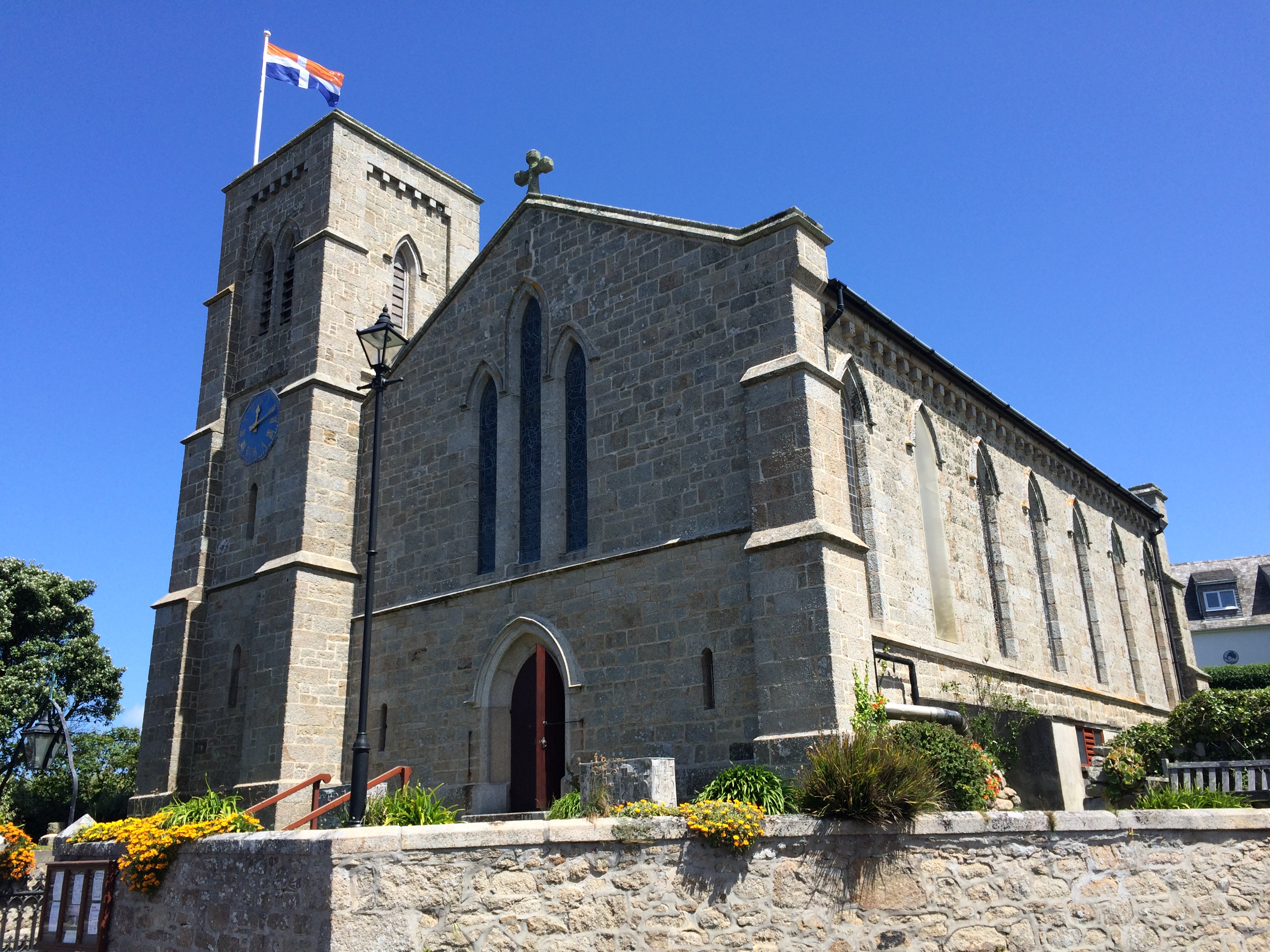
The Scillonian Cross flying above St Mary's Church in Hugh Town.

Two flags are used to represent Scilly, The Scillonian Cross, selected by readers of Scilly News in a 2002 vote and then registered with the Flag Institute as the flag of the islands, and the flag of the Council of the Isles of Scilly, which incorporates the council's logo and represents the council. An adapted version of the old Board of Ordnance flag has also been used, after it was left behind when munitions were removed from the isles. The "Cornish Ensign" (the Cornish cross with the Union Jack in the canton) has also been used.

=== Emergency services ===
The Isles of Scilly form part of the Devon and Cornwall Police force area. There is a police station in Hugh Town.

The Cornwall Air Ambulance helicopter provides cover to the islands.

The islands have their own independent fire brigade – the Isles of Scilly Fire and Rescue Service – which is staffed entirely by retained firefighters on all the inhabited islands.

The emergency ambulance service is provided by the South Western Ambulance Service with full-time paramedics employed to cover the islands working with emergency care attendants.

=== Administration ===
The Isles of Scilly altogether is a local government district, administered by a sui generis unitary authority, Council of the Isles of Scilly, which is independent from Cornwall Council.

== Education ==
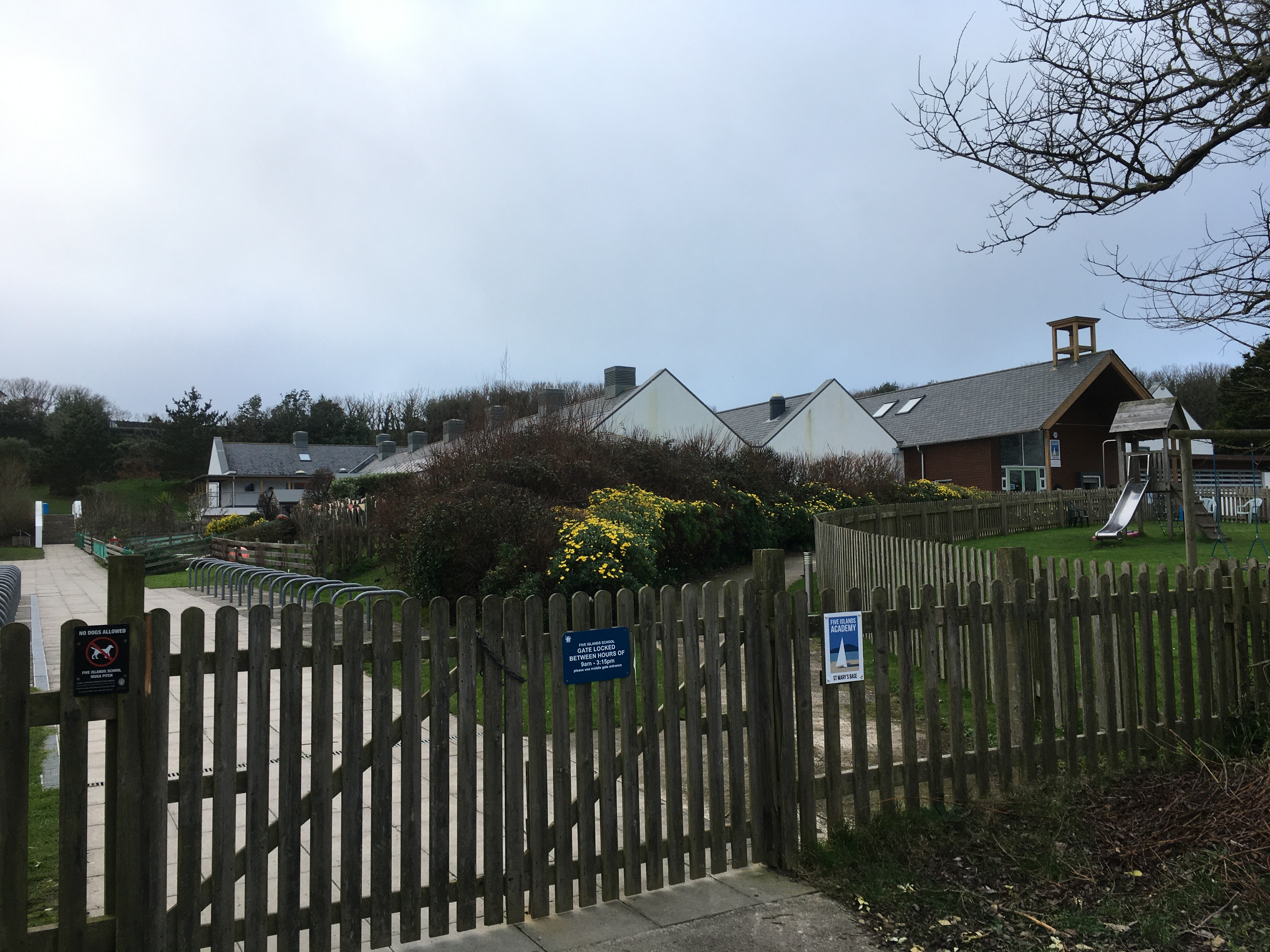
Five Islands Academy site at St Mary's

Education is available on the islands up to age 16. There is one school, the Five Islands Academy, which provides primary schooling at sites on St Agnes, St Mary's, St Martin's and Tresco, and secondary schooling at a site on St Mary's, with secondary students from outside St Mary's living at a school boarding house (Mundesley House) during the week. Sixteen- to eighteen-year-olds are entitled to a free sixth form place at a state school or sixth form college on the mainland, and are provided with free flights and a grant towards accommodation.

== Economy ==
=== Historical context ===
Since the mid-18th century the Scillonian economy has relied on trade with the mainland and beyond as a means of sustaining its population. Over the years the nature of this trade has varied, due to wider economic and political factors that have seen the rise and fall of industries, such as kelp harvesting, pilotage, smuggling, fishing, shipbuilding and, latterly flower farming. In a 1987 study of the Scillonian economy, Neate found that many farms on the islands were struggling to remain profitable due to increasing costs and strong competition from overseas producers, with resulting diversification into tourism. Statistics suggest that agriculture on the islands now represents less than 2% of all employment.

=== Tourism ===
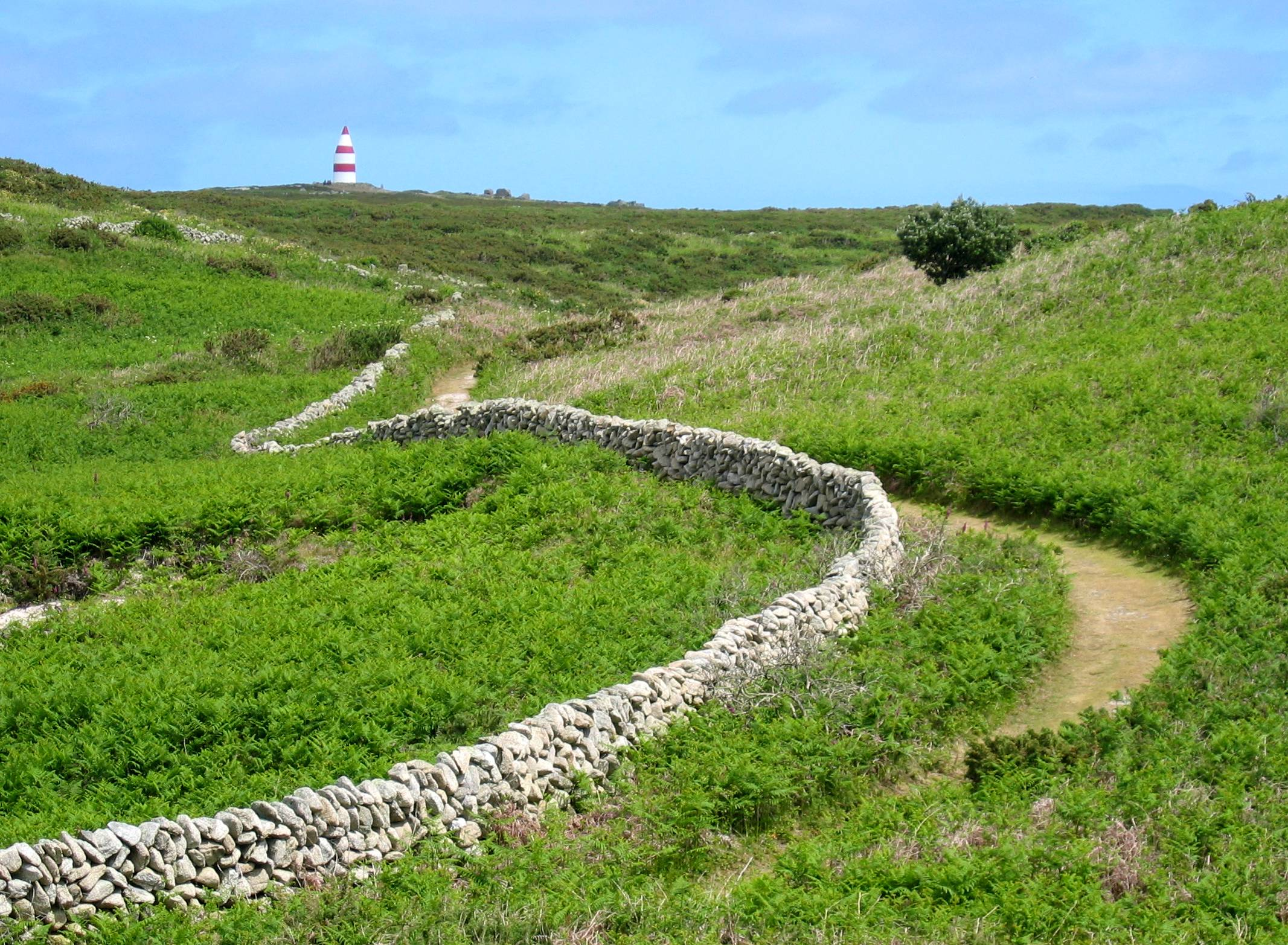
The Daymark (daylight version of a lighthouse) on St Martins, the nearest point to the mainland of Cornwall.

Today, tourism is estimated to account for 85% of the islands' income. The islands have been successful in attracting this investment due to their special environment, favourable summer climate, relaxed culture, efficient co-ordination of tourism providers and good transport links by sea and air to the mainland, uncommon in scale to similar-sized island communities.

The islands' economy is highly dependent on tourism, even by the standards of other island communities. "The concentration [on] a small number of sectors is typical of most similarly sized UK island communities. However, it is the degree of concentration, which is distinctive along with the overall importance of tourism within the economy as a whole and the very limited manufacturing base that stands out".

Tourism is also a highly seasonal industry owing to its reliance on outdoor recreation, and the lower number of tourists in winter results in a significant constriction of the islands' commercial activities. However, the tourist season benefits from an extended period of business in October when many birdwatchers ("twitchers") arrive.

==== Ornithology ====
Because of its position, Scilly is the first landing for many migrant birds, including extreme rarities from North America and Siberia. Scilly is situated far into the Atlantic Ocean, so many American vagrant birds will make first European landfall in the archipelago.

If an extremely rare bird turns up, the island will see a significant increase in numbers of birdwatchers. This type of birding, chasing after rare birds, is called "twitching".

The islands are home to ornithologist Will Wagstaff.

=== Employment ===
The predominance of tourism means that "tourism is by far the main sector throughout each of the individual islands, in terms of employment... [and] this is much greater than other remote and rural areas in the United Kingdom". Tourism accounts for approximately 63% of all employment.

Businesses dependent on tourism, with the exception of a few hotels, tend to be small enterprises typically employing fewer than four people; many of these are family run, suggesting an entrepreneurial culture among the local population. However, much of the work generated by this, with the exception of management, is low skilled and thus poorly paid, especially for those involved in cleaning, catering and retail.

Because of the seasonality of tourism, many jobs on the islands are seasonal and part-time, so work cannot be guaranteed throughout the year. Some islanders take up other temporary jobs 'out of season' to compensate for this. Due to a lack of local casual labour at peak holiday times, many of the larger employers accommodate guest workers.

=== Taxation ===
The islands were not subject to income tax until 1954, and there was no motor vehicle excise duty levied until 1971. The Council Tax is set by the Local Authority in order to meet their budget requirements. The Valuation Office Agency values properties for the purpose of council tax. The amount of council tax paid depends on the band of the property as shown below. The Isles of Scilly property valuation is based on what the property would have been worth in 1991.

Isles of Scilly Valuation (01/04/1991)
Band	Property Valuation	Average Tax
A	≤ £40,000	£1,087
B	£40,001 - £52,000	£1,268
C	£52,001 - £68,000	£1,450
D	£68,001 - £88,000	£1,631
E	£88,001 - £120,000	£1,993
F	£120,001 - £160,000	£2,356
G	£160,001 - £320,000	£2,718
H	> £320,000	£3,262

Source 1: Council of the Isles of Scilly

Source 2: Isles of Scilly Council Tax

=== Transport ===
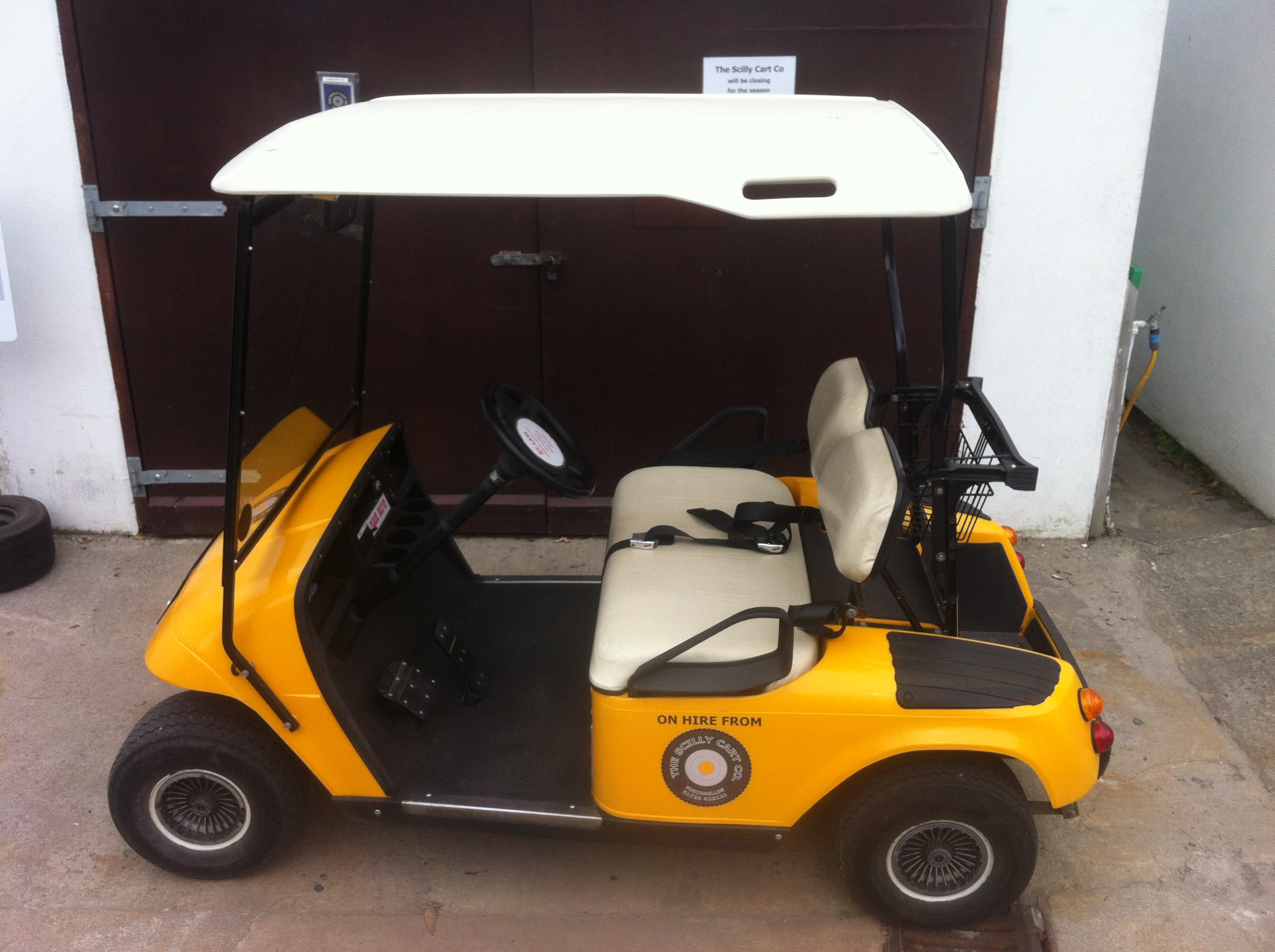
An electric golf buggy on St Mary's; these are road licensed and available for hire, as are bicycles, for use on public roads on the island.

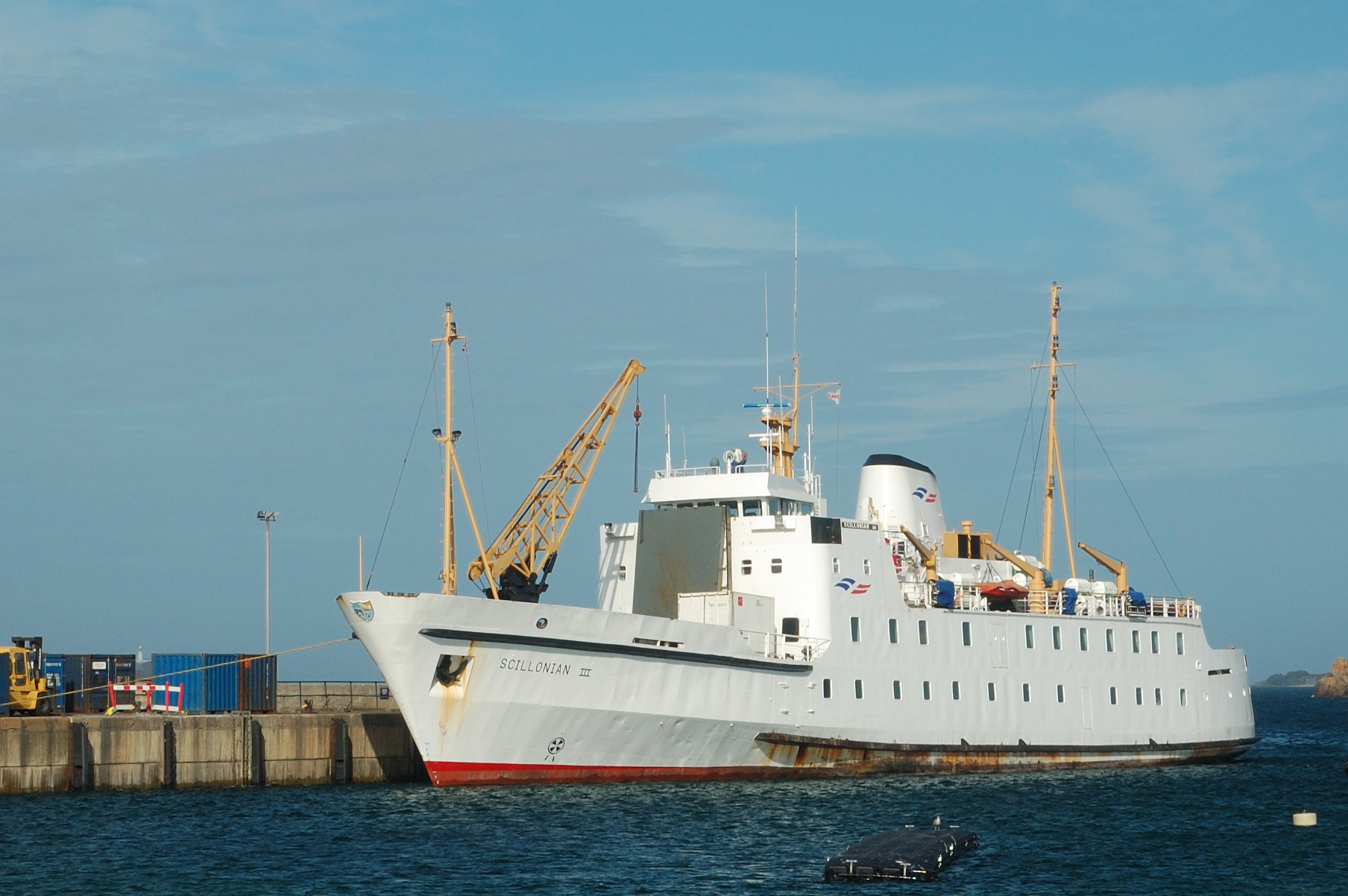
Scillonian III in St Mary's Harbour

St Mary's is the only island with a significant road network and the only island with classified roads - the A3110, A3111 and A3112. St Agnes and St Martin's also have public highways adopted by the local authority. In 2005 there were 619 registered vehicles on the island. The island also has taxis and a tour bus. Vehicles on the islands are exempt from annual MOT tests.

Fixed-wing aircraft services, operated by Isles of Scilly Skybus, operate from Land's End, Newquay and Exeter to St Mary's Airport. A scheduled helicopter service has operated from a new Penzance Heliport to both St Mary's Airport and Tresco Heliport since 2020. The helicopter is the only direct flight to the island of Tresco.

By sea, the Isles of Scilly Steamship Company provides a passenger and cargo service from Penzance to St Mary's, which is currently operated by the Scillonian III passenger ferry, supported until summer 2017 by the Gry Maritha cargo vessel and now by the Mali Rose. The other islands are linked to St. Mary's by a network of inter-island launches. From St Mary's this is provided by the St Mary's Boatmen's Association. St Mary's Harbour is the principal harbour of the Isles of Scilly, and is located in Hugh Town.

=== Tenure ===
A majority of the freehold land of the islands is the property of the Duchy of Cornwall, with a few exceptions, including much of Hugh Town on St Mary's, which was sold to the inhabitants in 1949. The duchy also holds 3,921 acres (1,587 hectares) as duchy property, part of the duchy's landholding. All the uninhabited islands, islets and rocks and much of the untenanted land on the inhabited islands is managed by the Isles of Scilly Wildlife Trust, which leases these lands from the Duchy for the rent of one daffodil per year.

Limited housing availability is a contentious yet critical issue for the Isles of Scilly, especially as it affects the feasibility of residency on the islands. Few properties are privately owned, with many units being let by the Duchy of Cornwall, the council and a few by housing associations. The management of these subsequently affects the possibility of residency on the islands.

Housing demand outstrips supply, a problem compounded by restrictions on further development designed to protect the islands' unique environment and prevent the infrastructural carrying capacity from being exceeded. This has pushed up the prices of the few private properties that become available and, significantly for the majority of the islands' populations, it has also affected the rental sector where rates have likewise drastically increased.

High housing costs pose significant problems for the local population, especially as local incomes (in Cornwall) are only 70% of the national average, whilst house prices are almost £5,000 higher than the national average. This in turn affects the retention of 'key workers' and the younger generation, which consequently affects the viability of schools and other essential community services.

The limited access to housing provokes strong local politics. It is often assumed that tourism is to blame for this, attracting newcomers to the area who can afford to outbid locals for available housing. Many buildings are used for tourist accommodation which reduces the number available for local residents. Second homes are also thought to account for a significant proportion of the housing stock, leaving many buildings empty for much of the year.

In December 2021, the Council bought a property to ease the housing crisis, which would be converted into 3 affordable homes. The council also, in January 2022, declared a housing crisis, due to the housing crisis placing the islands in "real danger of putting essential services at risk, such as the hospital and school". The council also highlighted that 15 households would be homeless by March and would face having to move from the Islands.

=== Utilities ===
The SS Caroline was used to lay 25.5 miles (41.0 km) 125 tons of cable to connect the Isles of Scilly with the telegraph network in Cornwall. The initial connections were made in 1870 when a line was laid to St Mary’s from Zawn Reeve, a nook of Mill Bay to Deep Point in Scilly which was renamed, Cable Bay, arriving into the area now known as Telegraph and with a branch from St Mary’s to the library at Tresco Abbey.

A telephone exchange was opened in the Atlantic Hotel, St Mary's, in February 1938. The messages between the Islands and the mainland were carried by ultra-short-wave radio link using a short-wave length of about 5 metres (16 ft).. The radio stations on St Mary’s and at St Just were connected to the Isles of Scilly telephone exchange (named Scillonia) and the Penzance telephone exchanges by land lines. The site at St Just was chosen as it provided an optical path between the two radio terminals. They were mains operated and consisted of crystal controlled transmitters using a power of one watt associated with super-heterodyne receivers with crystal controlled oscilators. Special signalling equipment was installed at the terminal exchanges to enable normal ringing facilities to be made available to the exchange operators controlling the trunk circuits.

Starting in 1932 a public electricity supply was provided on St Mary's by installing successive diesel generators in a power station on the island, eventually totalling 5 MW. Other islands had no public electricity supply and consumers generated their own electricity. In 1985–86, 11 kV submarine cables were installed to connect St Agnes, Tresco, St Martin's and Bryher to St Mary's, and in 1988–89 the islands were connected to the mainland by a 33 kV submarine cable of 7.5 MW capacity running from Whitesand Bay near Land's End to Porthcressa Bay on St Mary's. The power station is maintained but is now used only when the cable is unavailable. There are also 200 kVA generators on Bryher and St Agnes for use when the inter-island cables are unavailable.

Water comes from boreholes and, on St Mary's, a desalination plant at Mount Todden providing 40–50% of demand, with only a small amount of surface water collection.

On St Mary's, Hugh Town and Old Town have piped foul drainage systems, discharging the eventual effluent into the sea. Tresco has a sewage treatment plant. All other properties have septic tanks.

== Notable people ==
- John Godolphin (1617–1678), an English jurist and writer, and Judge of the High Court of Admiralty.
- Augustus Smith (1804–1872), politician, MP for Truro; 1857–1865, philanthropist and the local Lord Proprietor from 1834 to 1872.
- Sir Frederick Hervey-Bathurst, 3rd Baronet (1807–1881), cricketer who played 92 First-class cricket matches for Hampshire
- John Deason (1829–1915), he co-discovered in Australia in 1869 the largest alluvial gold nugget ever discovered
- Constance Meyer (1882–1967), a competitive diver from St Martin's who was the AAU women's champion in 1915 and 1917.
- Stella Turk (1925–2017), zoologist, naturalist and conservationist.
- David Hunt (1934–1985), ornithologist who worked mostly on the Isles of Scilly
- Sam Llewellyn (born 1948 in Tresco), a British author of literature for children and adults.
- Philip Hygate, politician and farmer, he was the Chief Executive of the Council of the Isles of Scilly from 1992 to 2012
- Robert Francis, politician and businessman, Chairman of the Council of the Isles of Scilly from 2018 to 2026.

== Culture ==
=== People ===
According to the 2001 UK census, 97% of the population of the islands are white British, with nearly 93% of the inhabitants born in the islands, in mainland Cornwall or elsewhere in England. Following EU enlargement in 2004, a number of central Europeans moved to the island, joining the Australians, New Zealanders and South Africans who traditionally made up most of the islands' overseas workers. In 2005, their numbers were estimated at nearly 100 out of a total population of just over 2,000. The Isles have also been referred to as "the land that crime forgot", reflecting lower crime levels than national averages.

=== Sport ===
One continuing legacy of the isles' past is Cornish gig racing, wherein fast rowing boats ("gigs") with crews of six (or in one case, seven) race between the main islands. Gig racing has been said to derive from the race to collect salvage from shipwrecks on the rocks around Scilly, but the race was actually to deliver a pilot onto incoming vessels, to guide them through the hazardous reefs and shallows. (The boats are correctly termed "pilot gigs"). The World Pilot Gig Championships are held annually over the May Day bank holiday weekend. The event originally involved crews from the Islands and a few crews from mainland Cornwall, but in the intervening years the number of gigs attending has increased, with crews coming from all over the South-West and further afield.

Since 1977, rock climbing on the granite crags and boulders along the Scilly coastine has been practised. The area predominantly provides bouldering and trad climbing, although deep water solo and aid climbing routes have also been established. Bouldering is mostly practiced on St Agnes whereas most routes are found on the southern coast of St Mary's. The hardest route is considered to be Rock Hard Peninnis (also known as When The Boat Comes In) graded E4 6a. Located on Peninnis Head on St Mary's, it was first ascended by Andy Grieve, Sean Hawken and R. Plymouth in September 1996.

The Isles of Scilly is home to what is reportedly the smallest football league in the world, the Isles of Scilly Football League.

In December 2006, Sport England published a survey which revealed that residents of the Isles of Scilly were the most active in England in sports and other fitness activities. 32% of the population participate at least three times a week for 30 minutes or more.

There is a golf club with a nine-hole course (each with two tees) situated on the island of St Mary's, near Porthloo and Telegraph, which was founded in 1904.

=== Media ===
The islands are served by the Halangy Down radio and television transmitter on St Mary's north of Telegraph at 49.932505°N 6.305358°W. It is a relay of the main transmitter at Redruth (Cornwall) that broadcasts BBC South West, ITV West Country, BBC Radio 1, 2, 3, 4 and BBC Radio Cornwall and the range of Freeview television and BBC radio channels on the public service broadcast multiplexes. Radio Scilly, a community radio station, was launched in September 2007. In January 2020, Radio Scilly was rebranded as Islands FM.

The Isles of Scilly were featured on the TV programme Seven Natural Wonders as one of the wonders of South West England. Since 2007 the islands have featured in the BBC series An Island Parish, following various real-life stories and featuring in particular the newly appointed Chaplain to the Isles of Scilly. A 12-part series was filmed in 2007 and first broadcast on BBC2 in January 2008. After Reverend David Easton left the islands in 2009, the series continued under the same name but focused elsewhere.

== See also ==
- List of shipwrecks of the Isles of Scilly
- List of extreme points of the United Kingdom
- Three Hundred and Thirty Five Years' War
- Isles of Scilly Football League
