= List of islands of the Isles of Scilly =

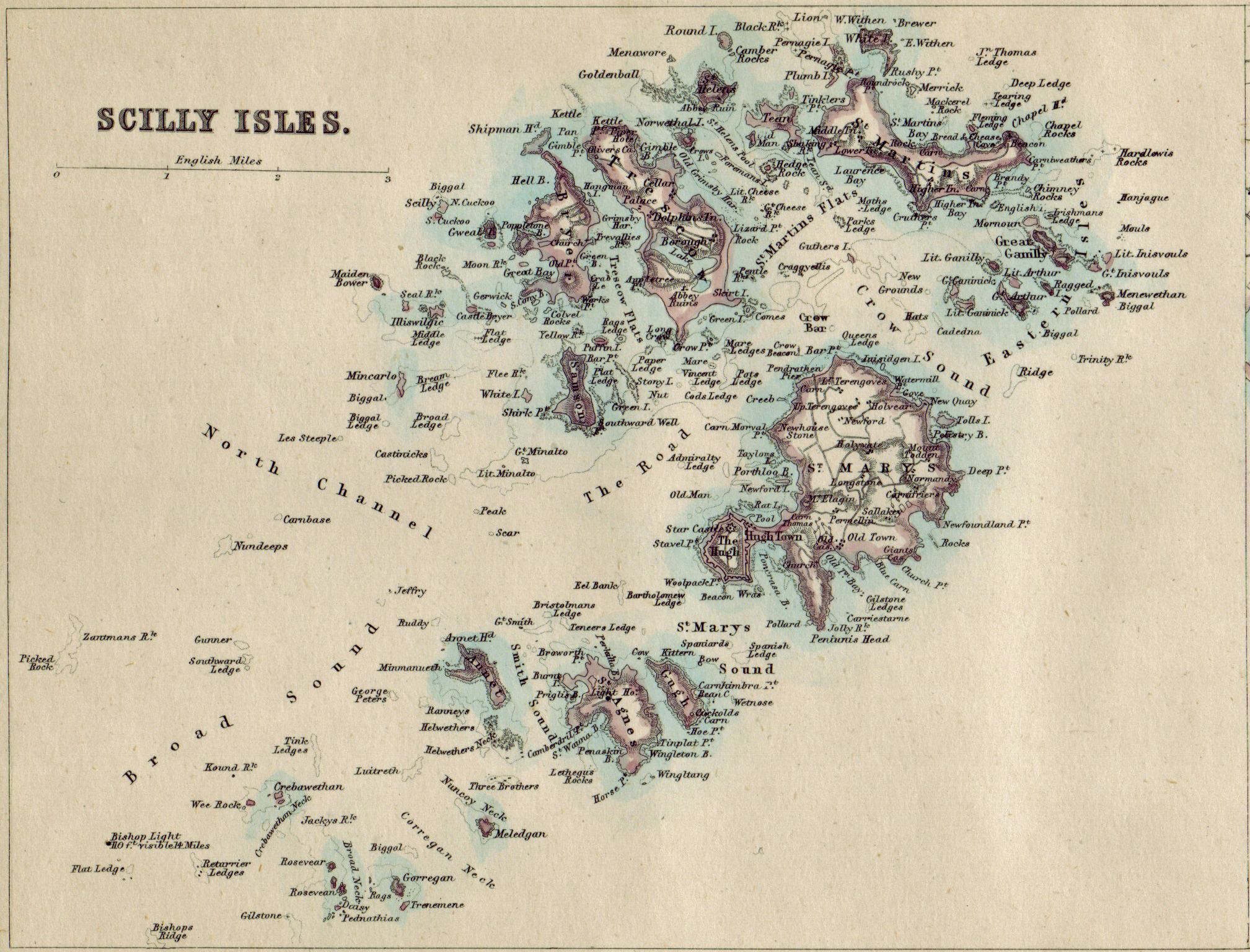
Bartholomew's map "Scilly Isles"

This is a list of the islands in the Isles of Scilly.

== Inhabited islands ==
There are five inhabited islands of the Isles of Scilly, Cornwall, United Kingdom (six if you count the tidal island of Gugh which is separated from St. Agnes at high tide).

Name	Image	Coordinates	Population	Area (hectares)	Elevation (metres)
Bryher		SV876361	83	122	42
Gugh			3	50	34
St Agnes		SV881430	73	366	
St Martin's		925 159 SV 925 159	142	237	47
St Mary's		SV915115	1723 (2011)	629	51
Tresco		SV894147	175 (2011)	297	44

== Islands around Bryher ==
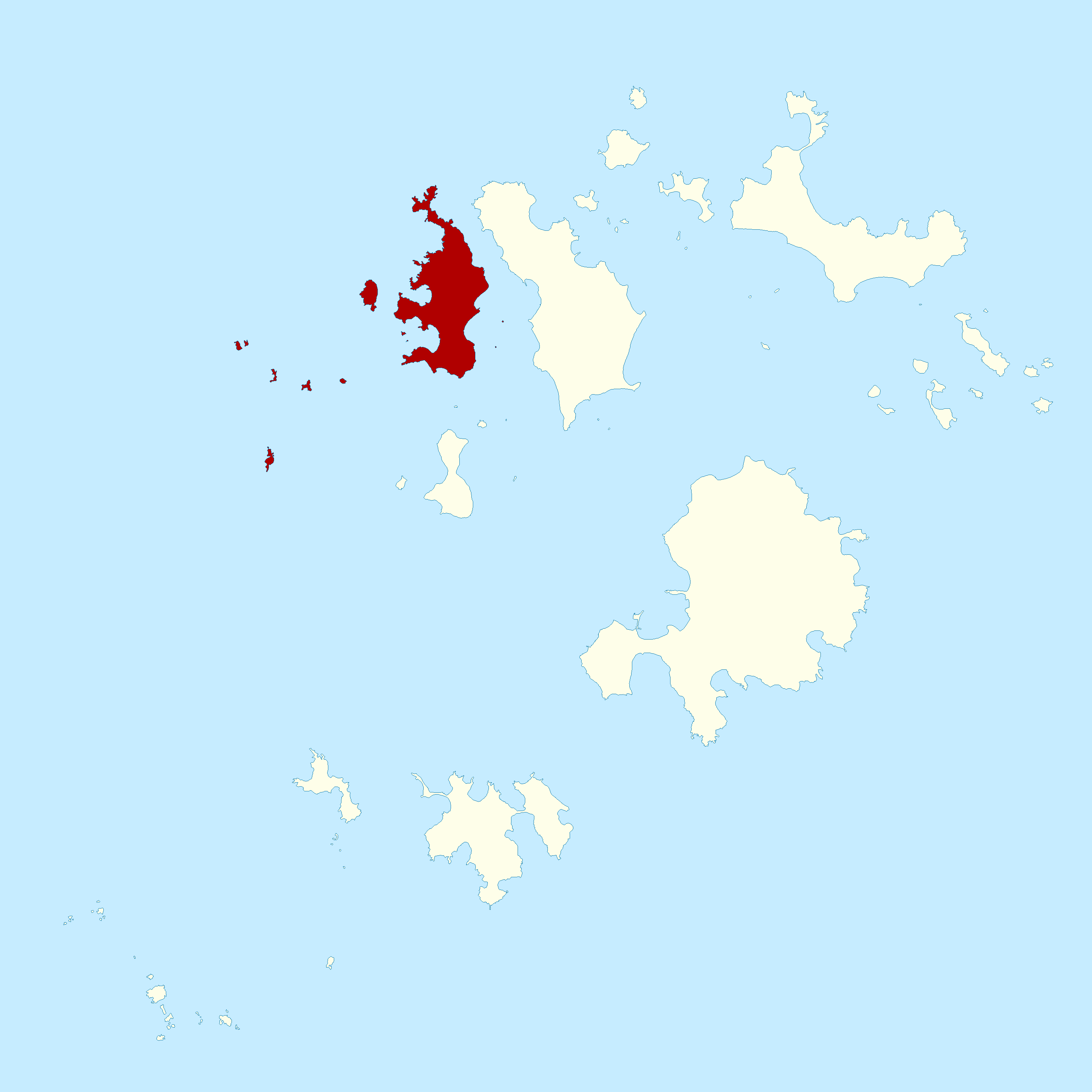
The civil parish of Bryher

The following islands lie in the civil parish of Bryher, and include the group of Norrard Rocks which were designated as a Site of Special Scientific Interest in 1971. The only inhabited island in this area is Bryher itself.

Name	Image	Coordinates	Area (hectares)
Castle Bryher		SV863140	0.39
Gweal		SV866152	5.82
Illiswilgig		SV858139	0.9
Maiden Bower		SV850145	0.66
Mincarlo		SV853129	1.82
Scilly Rock		SV859156	1.98
Seal Rock		SV854141	0.2
Zantman's Rock			0.02

== Islands around St. Agnes ==
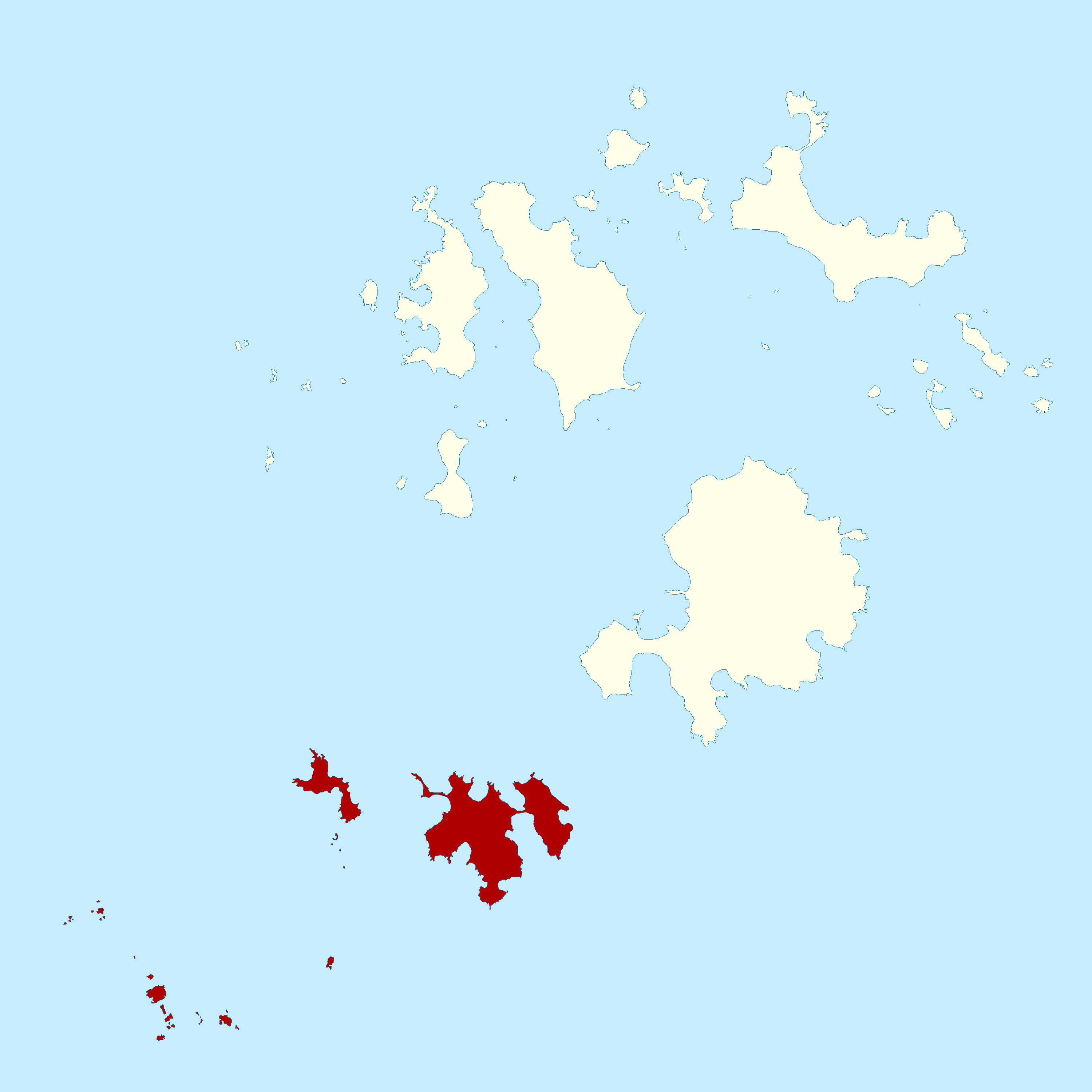
The civil parish of St. Agnes

The following islands lie in the civil parish of St. Agnes, and include the group of Western Rocks. The only inhabited islands in this area are St Agnes and Gugh.

Name	Image	Coordinates	Area (hectares)
Annet			21
Biggal of Gorregan			
Burnt Island			
Daisy		SV839053	0.57
Gilstone		SV832053	
Gorregan			1.57
Great Crebawethan		SV830071	0.51
Hellweathers			
Jacky's Rock			
Little Crebawethan		SV827069	0.14
Melledgan			0.96
Retarrier Ledges		SV820059	
Rosevean		SV839056	0.63
Rosevear			4
The Brow			

== Islands around St. Martin's ==
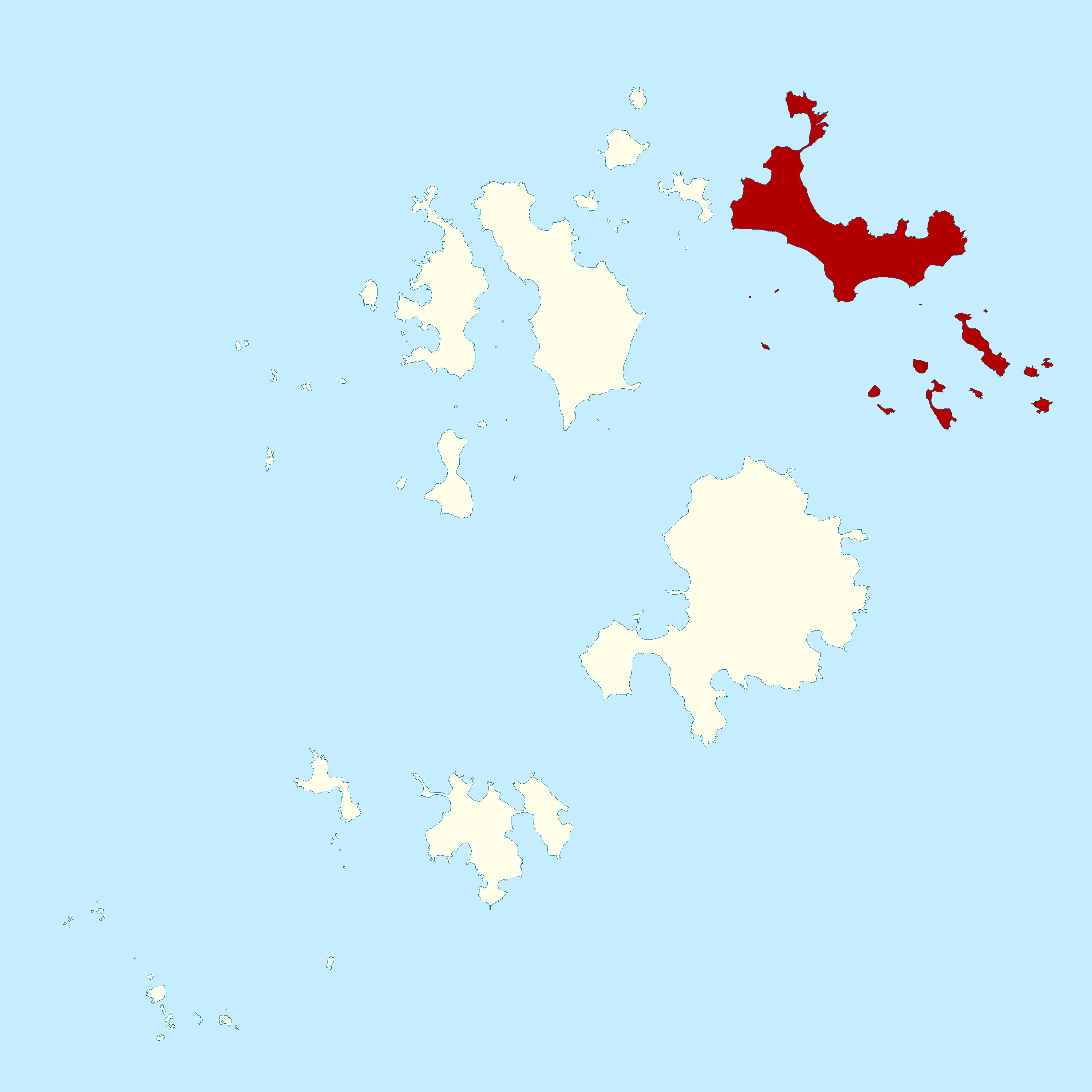
The civil parish of St. Martin's

The following islands lie in the civil parish of St. Martin's, and include the group of Eastern Isles. The only inhabited island in this area is St Martin's itself.

Name	Image	Coordinates	Area (hectares)
Eastern Isles		, SV939149	
Great Arthur			
Great Ganilly			13
Great Ganinick			
Great Innisvouls			
Guther's Island			
Hanjague		SV957150	
Little Ganilly			
Little Ganinick			
Little Innisvouls		SV955142	
Menawethan		SV954137	
Moths Ledge		9205 1516 SV 9205 1516	
Nornour		SV944148	
Ragged Island		SV946138	
White Island			15

== Islands around St. Mary's ==
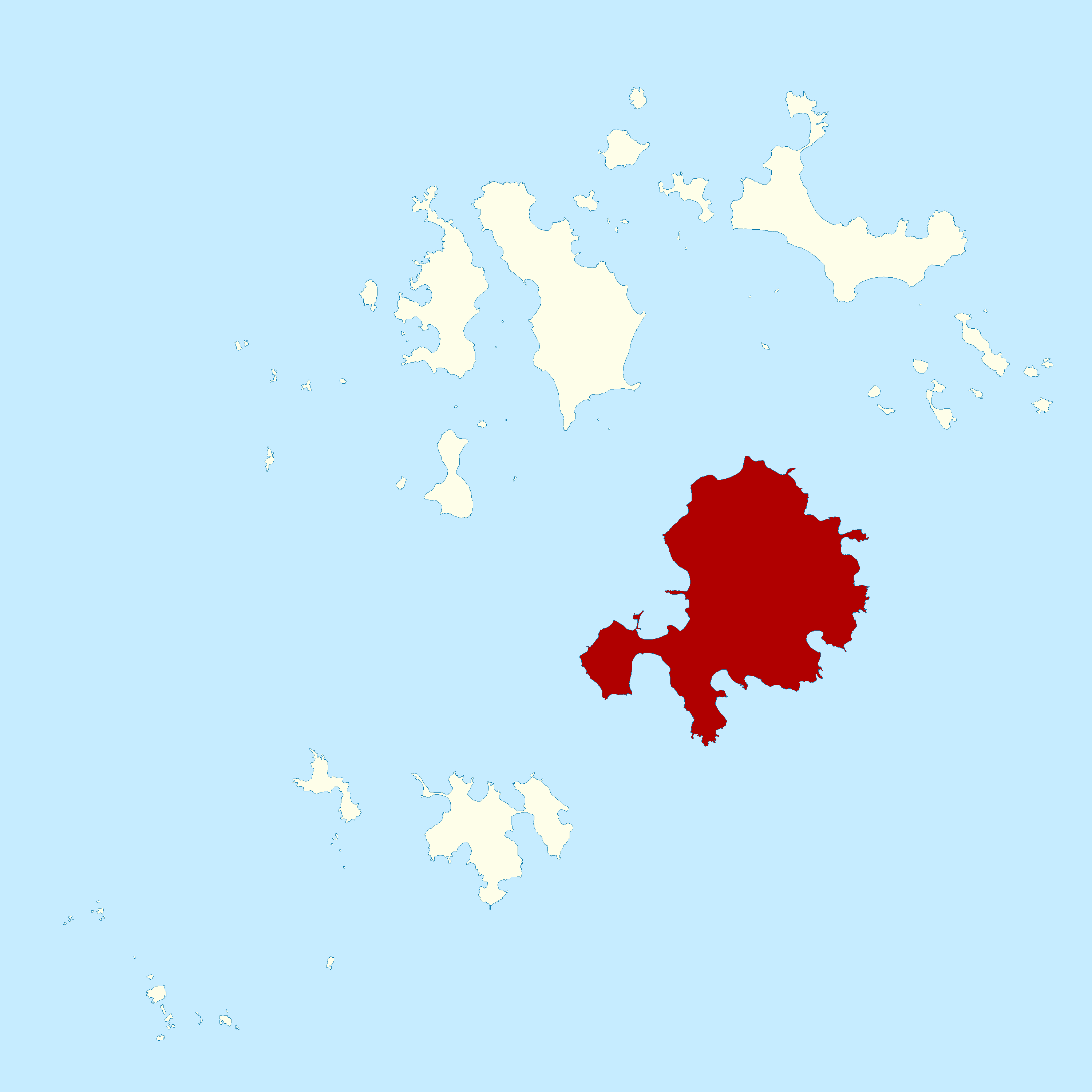
The civil parish of St. Mary's

The civil parish of St. Mary's contains the island of St Mary's itself which includes a few tidal islands which are connected at low tide.

Name	Image	Coordinates	Area (hectares)
Newford Island			
Taylor's Island			
Toll's Island			

== Islands around Tresco ==
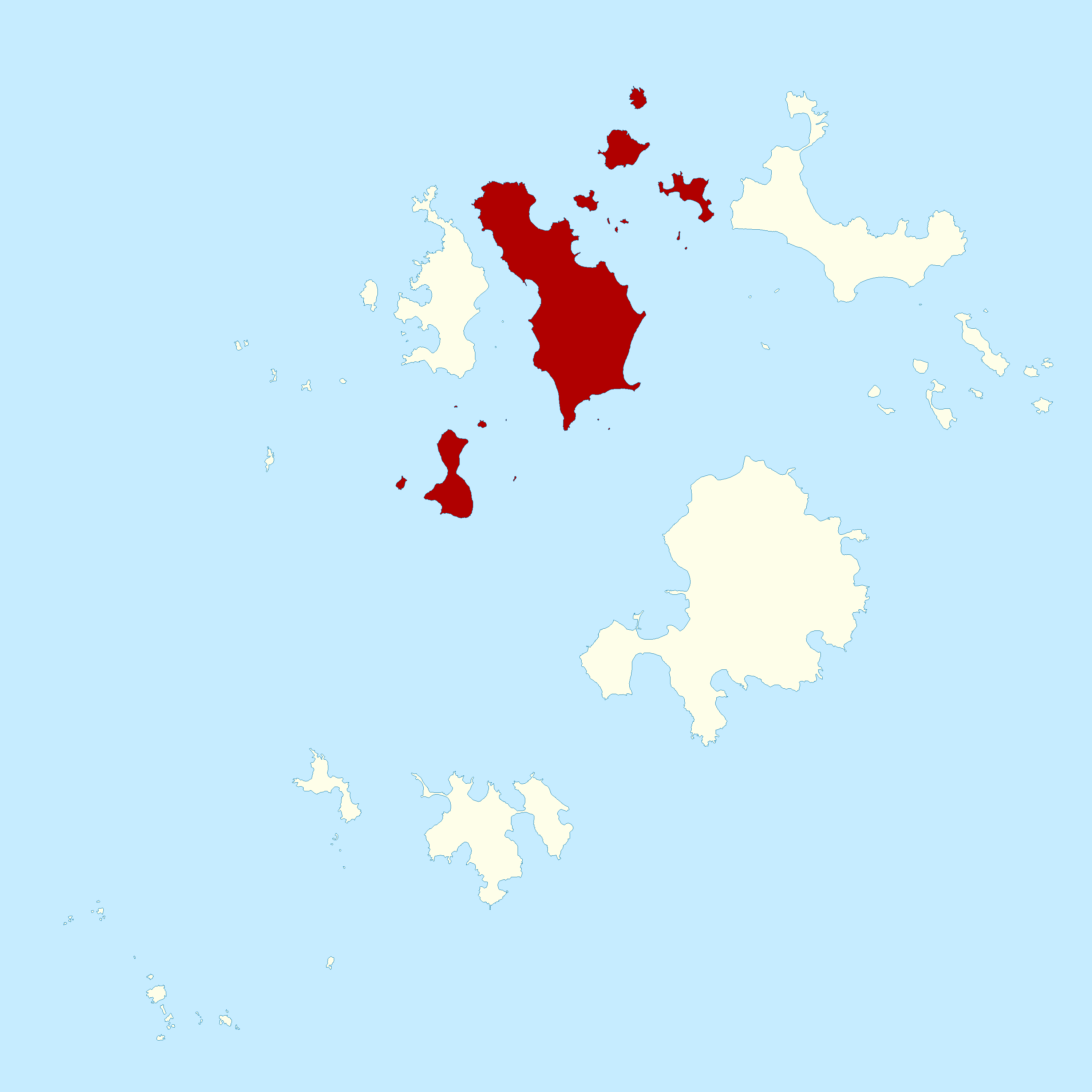
The civil parish of Tresco

The following islands lie in the civil parish of Tresco. The only inhabited island in this area is Tresco itself.

Name	Image	Coordinates	Area (hectares)
Broad Ledge			
Green Island			
Hedge Rock			
Mare Ledges			
Northwethel		SV895163	4.63
Old Man			
Pednbrose			
Round Island			1.2
Samson			38
St Helen's			20
Stony Island			
Teän			16
Tobaccoman's Ledge			
