= Bryher =

Island in the Isles of Scilly, England

Coordinates: 49.954°N 6.356°W

Bryher: Cornish: Breyer
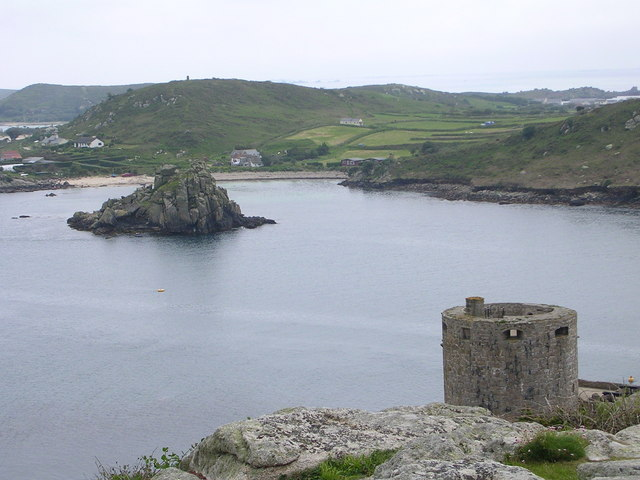
- Bryher seen from Tresco

- Location within Isles of Scilly
- Population: 84 (2011)
- OS grid reference: SV876361
- Civil parish: Bryher
- Unitary authority: Isles of Scilly
- Ceremonial county: Cornwall
- Region: South West
- Country: England
- Sovereign state: United Kingdom
- Post town: ISLES OF SCILLY
- Postcode district: TR23
- Dialling code: 01720
- Police: Devon and Cornwall
- Fire: Isles of Scilly
- Ambulance: South Western
- UK Parliament: St Ives

Bryher (Cornish: Breyer, lit. 'place of hills') is one of the smallest inhabited islands of the Isles of Scilly, with a population of 84 in 2011, spread across 134 hectares (1.34 km^{2}). The apparently larger population of 177 in 2021 is misleading - the census captures numbers sleeping on the island on a given date, and in 2021 this date fell during the tourist season and numbers therefore included visitors.

== History ==
=== Toponymy ===
The name of the island was recorded as Braer in 1319, as Brayer in 1336, and as Brear in 1500. It has also been called Brehar and Bryther - the name Bryher is relatively modern. The island's name derives from Cornish place-name element 'bre' ('hill') and the plural suffix 'yer' meaning, 'the hills' or 'place of hills'.

=== Archaeology ===
An iron-age grave, containing a sword and a mirror, was discovered on Bryher by a farmer in 1999. In 2023 analysis of the teeth of the deceased showed her to be a female, leading to her being referred to as Bryher Woman.

The Early Bronze Age saw considerable construction of burial and ceremonial monuments on Bryher, although little evidence of recognisable settlement. There are large numbers of grouped cairns - the cairnfield on Shipman Head contains over 130, mostly flat, low, platform cairns, laid in deliberate patterns. A few of them are chambered: these may not have been used for the permanent interment of corpses. While there is no doubt that human remains played a part in the lives of some cairns, they were not mausoleums, and seems more likely that they served as monuments for events relating to both the living and the dead.

A shard of possible Bell Beaker Culture pottery has been found on Bonfire Carn, the only Beaker artefact to have been discovered on Scilly .

The remains of an extensive prehistoric field system can still be seen in the intertidal zone at Green Bay. Isolated walls are visible as lines of spaced boulders and edge set slabs. Whilst it is believed that the separation of Bryher, Tresco and Samson by rising sea levels was mostly achieved by 1,500 BC, the Romans were still referring to the Isles of Scilly as one large island as late as the 4th-century.

== Geography ==
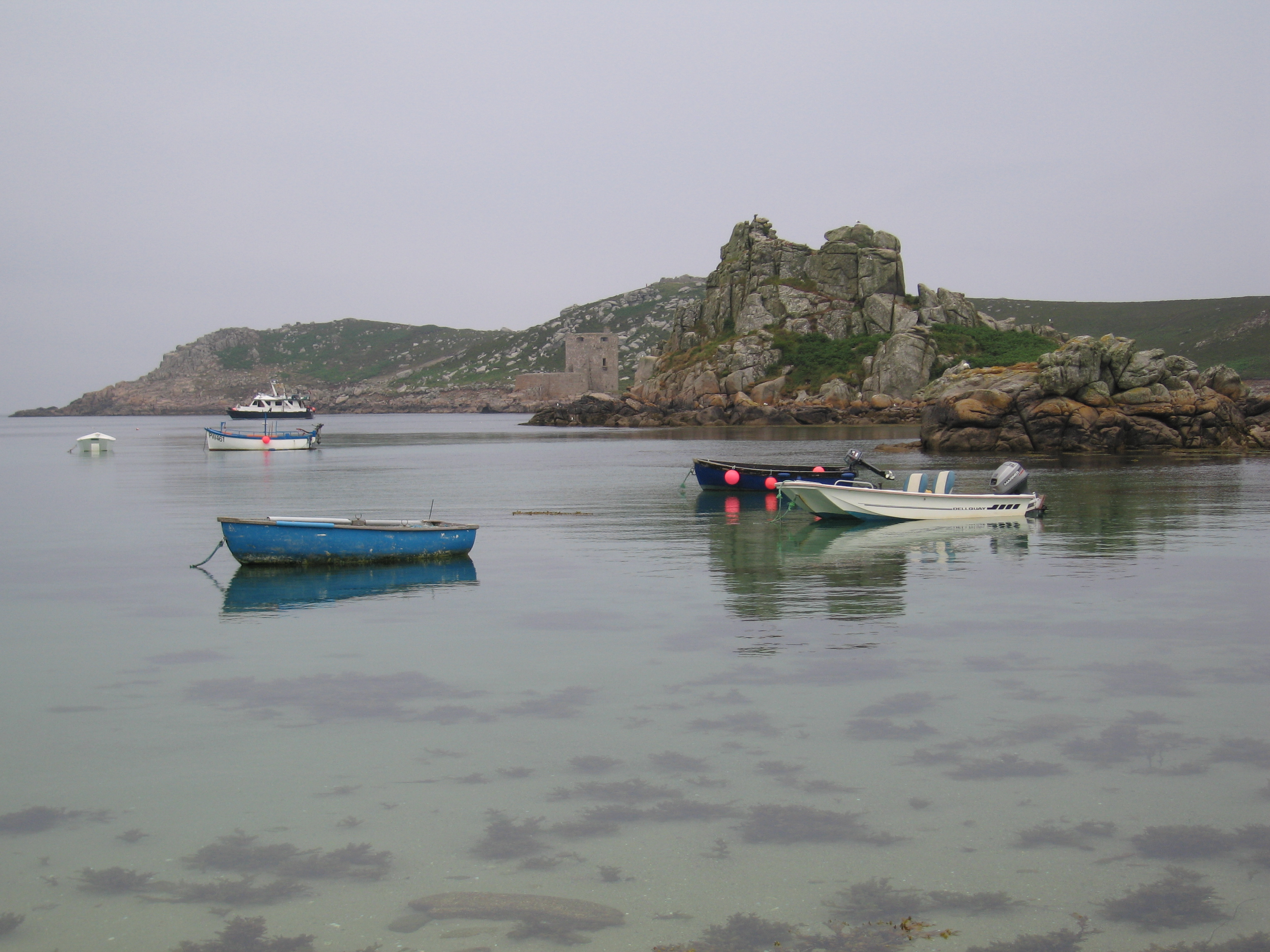
A view of Bryher

The island is a procession of prominent hills all joined to one another by low-lying necks and sandy bars. It would only need sea levels to rise by a few metres for the southern part of Bryher to transform itself into a group of five or six separate islands. As all these hills – Gweal, Timmy's, Watch, Heathy and Samson – are exposed and windswept. Watch Hill, the island's highest point, has a stone marker on top and small stone shelter that was possibly once used as a look-out by gig crews watching for wrecks. The island has a length of 2 kilometres (1.2 mi), a maximum width of 1 kilometre (0.62 mi) and an area of 134 hectares (330 acres), including Shipman Head, which rises to 42 metres (138 ft) at the northern end of the island. Bryher lies to the west of Tresco, and is separated from that island by the Tresco Channel, once the main anchorage for the islands and now an area where sandflats are exposed at low tide. Off the southern end of Bryher is the uninhabited island of Samson. It is possible to walk between the three islands at the lowest spring tides.

The settlement at the Pool is the westernmost in England. Without the tidal island of Gugh included, St Agnes is marginally smaller than Bryher; however if Gugh is included with St Agnes, which is the common interpretation, then Bryher is (again, marginally) the smallest of the populated isles of Scilly.

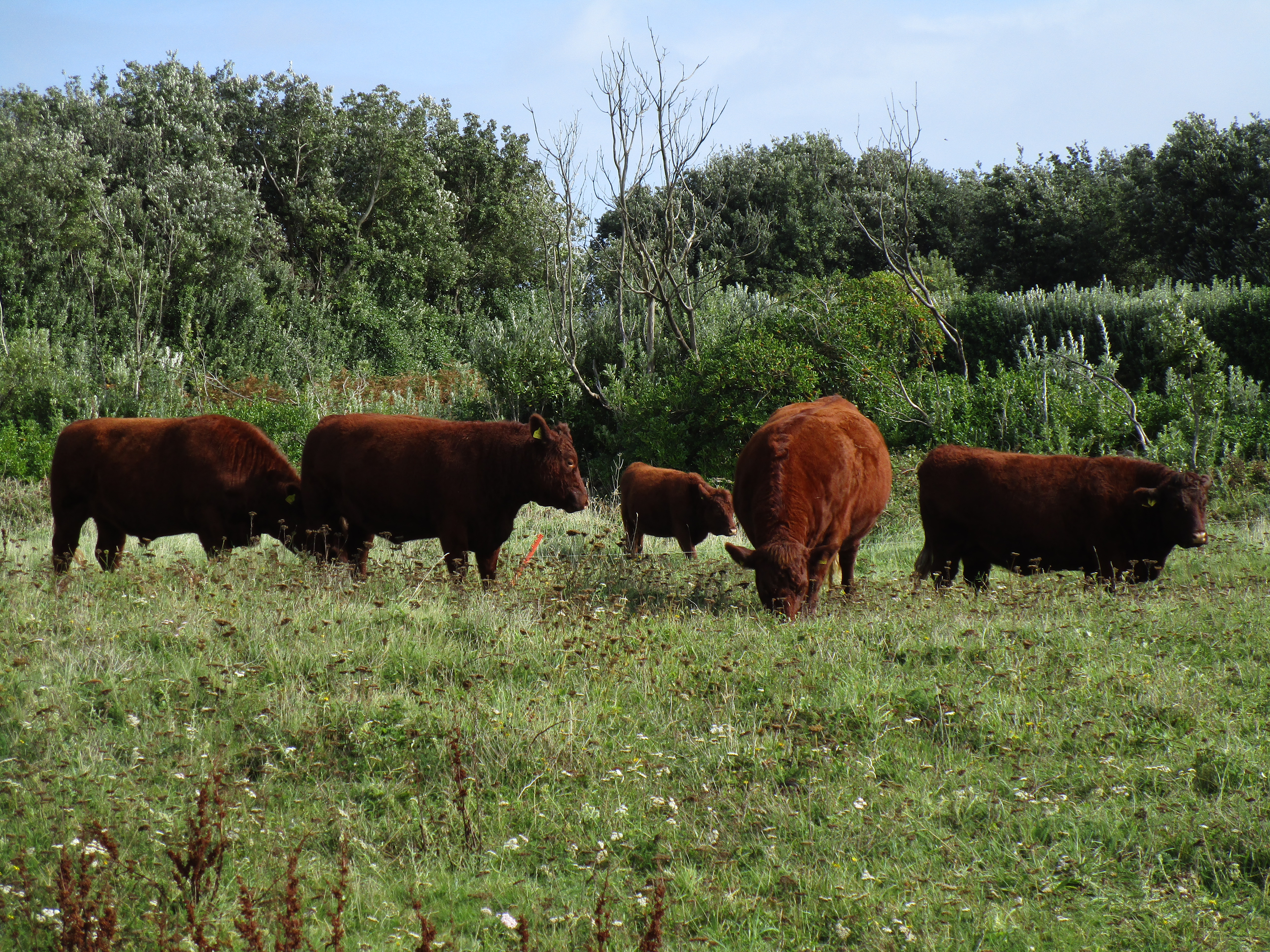
Ruby Red Devon cattle used for conservation grazing; on Rushy Bay Green, Bryher.

The centre of Bryher is mainly low-lying with arable fields, pasture and housing and is where most of the population live. On the west side is the brackish Great Pool - the only true brackish lagoon on Scilly - which is separated from the sea by a narrow storm beach, and in the south are sandy beaches like Rushy Bay. The island lies within the Isles of Scilly Heritage Coast, is part of the Isles of Scilly Area of Outstanding Natural Beauty and untenanted land is leased by the Duchy of Cornwall to the Isles of Scilly Wildlife Trust which is using ponies and red ruby cattle to graze the overgrown areas as part of the Waves of Heath project.

=== Hell Bay ===
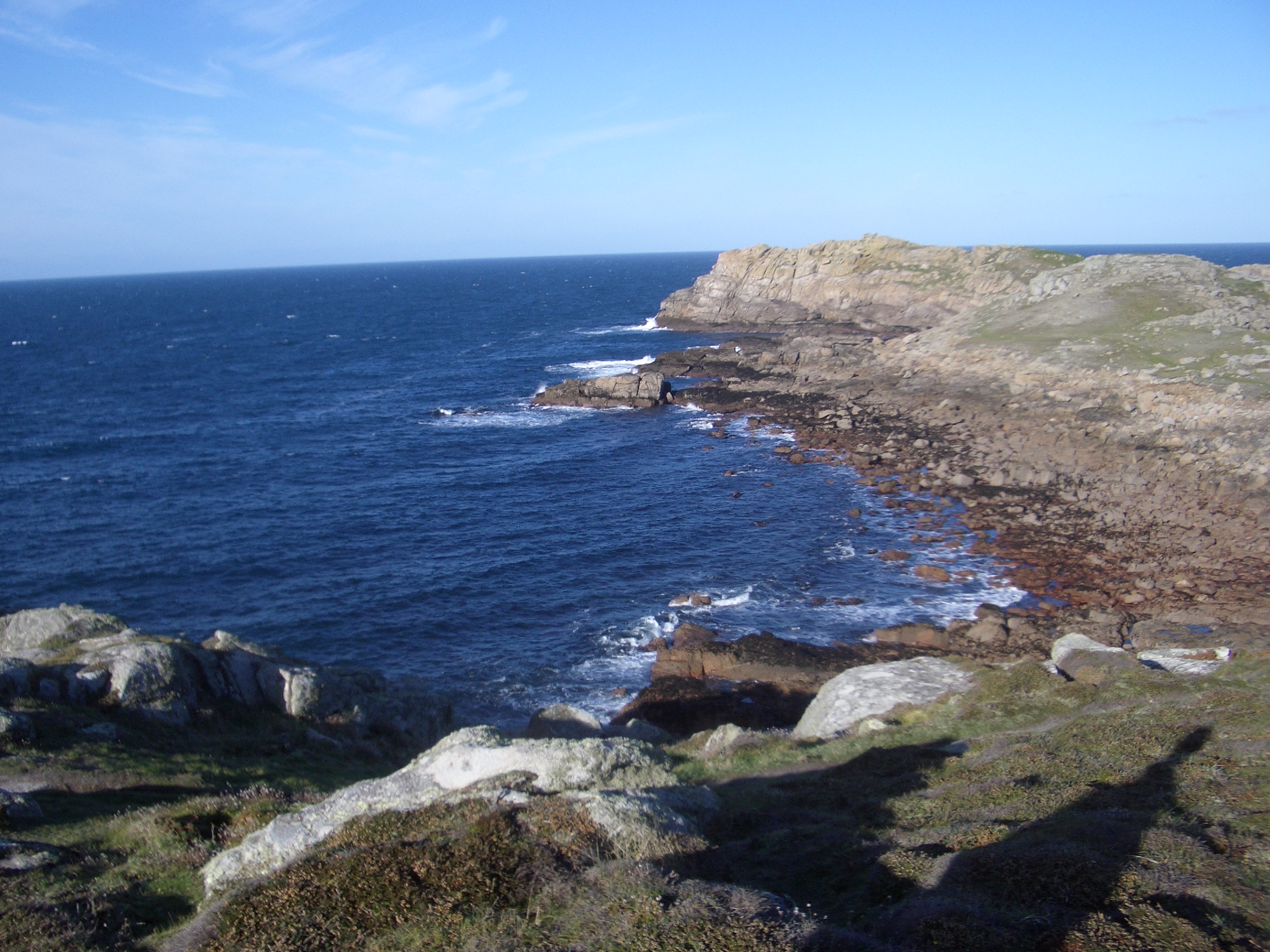
Hell Bay, Bryher

The infamous Hell Bay, named for its wild waves and swell, is on the north-west coast of Bryher, immediately to the south of Shipman Head. This Atlantic-facing cove became a notorious place for shipwrecks in the 18th and 19th centuries, although most ships wrecked on Scilly were wrecked on the many hazards in the Western approaches to the archipelago well before they could reach Hell Bay.

Hell Bay also gives its name to Bryher's only hotel, Hell Bay Hotel, which is the most westerly hotel in England.

== Civil parish and ward ==
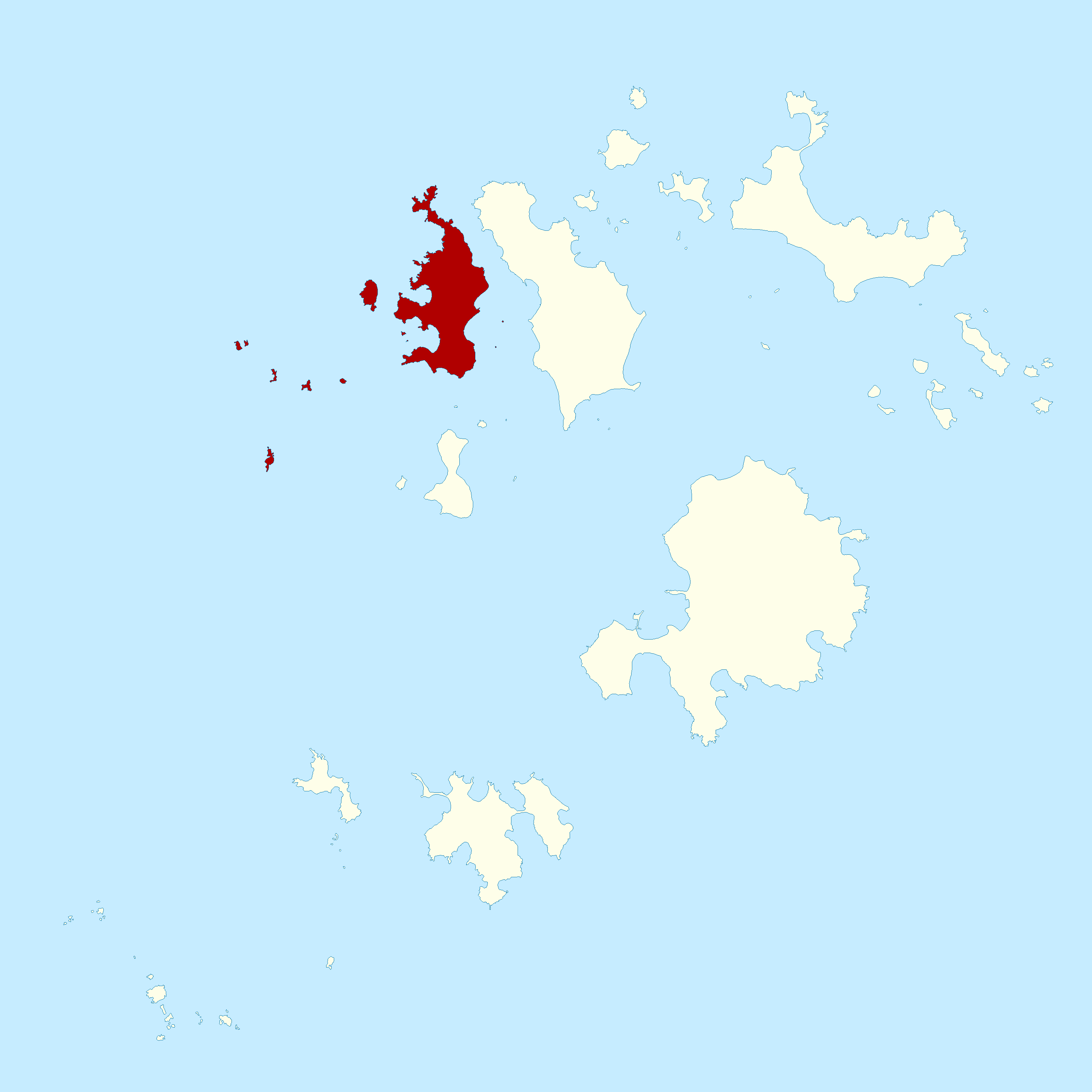
The Isles of Scilly, comprising the civil parish and ward of Bryher, shown in red.

Bryher is one of the five civil parishes of the Isles of Scilly, which are also wards. The civil parish and ward include several uninhabited islands and rocks, including the Norrard Rocks, Gweal, Zantman's Rock and the Crim Rocks (the westernmost place of England). Bryher returns one councillor to the Council of the Isles of Scilly, the same as the other "off-island" wards. The civil parish is not functional, however, and there is no council or meeting.

In the 2021 United Kingdom local elections held on 6 May 2021, no persons were nominated to stand for election in the ward, causing another election to be held in accordance with section 39(1) of the Representation of the People Act 1983.

== Demography ==
Historical population
Year	Pop.	±%
1841	121	—
1851	34 Families	—
1861	115	—
1871	104	−9.6%
1881	103	−1.0%
1891	91	−11.7%
1901	97	+6.6%
1911	113	+16.5%
1921	101	−10.6%
1931	64	−36.6%
1951	117	+82.8%
1961	66	−43.6%
1971	57	−13.6%
1981	66	+15.8%
1991	80	+21.2%
2001	92	+15.0%
2009	83	−9.8%
2011	84	+1.2%
2021	177	+110.7%

Bryher was recorded as having 177 residents on the 2021 United Kingdom census.

== Churches ==
=== All Saints' Church ===
All Saints' Church (Church of England) is in the centre of the island, close to the east coast, opposite New Grimsby on Tresco. A church was originally built on the site in about 1742 (a small building dedicated to 'God and All Saints' which also served the community on Samson). It was enlarged in 1822 by the surveyor Christopher Strick, with further additions and alterations in 1882. A new chancel was added in 1897 and new roof (6 feet higher than the previous) in 1930. The four modern stained glass windows by Oriel Hicks (Phoenix Stained Glass) were completed in 2007.

=== Bryher Baptist Church ===
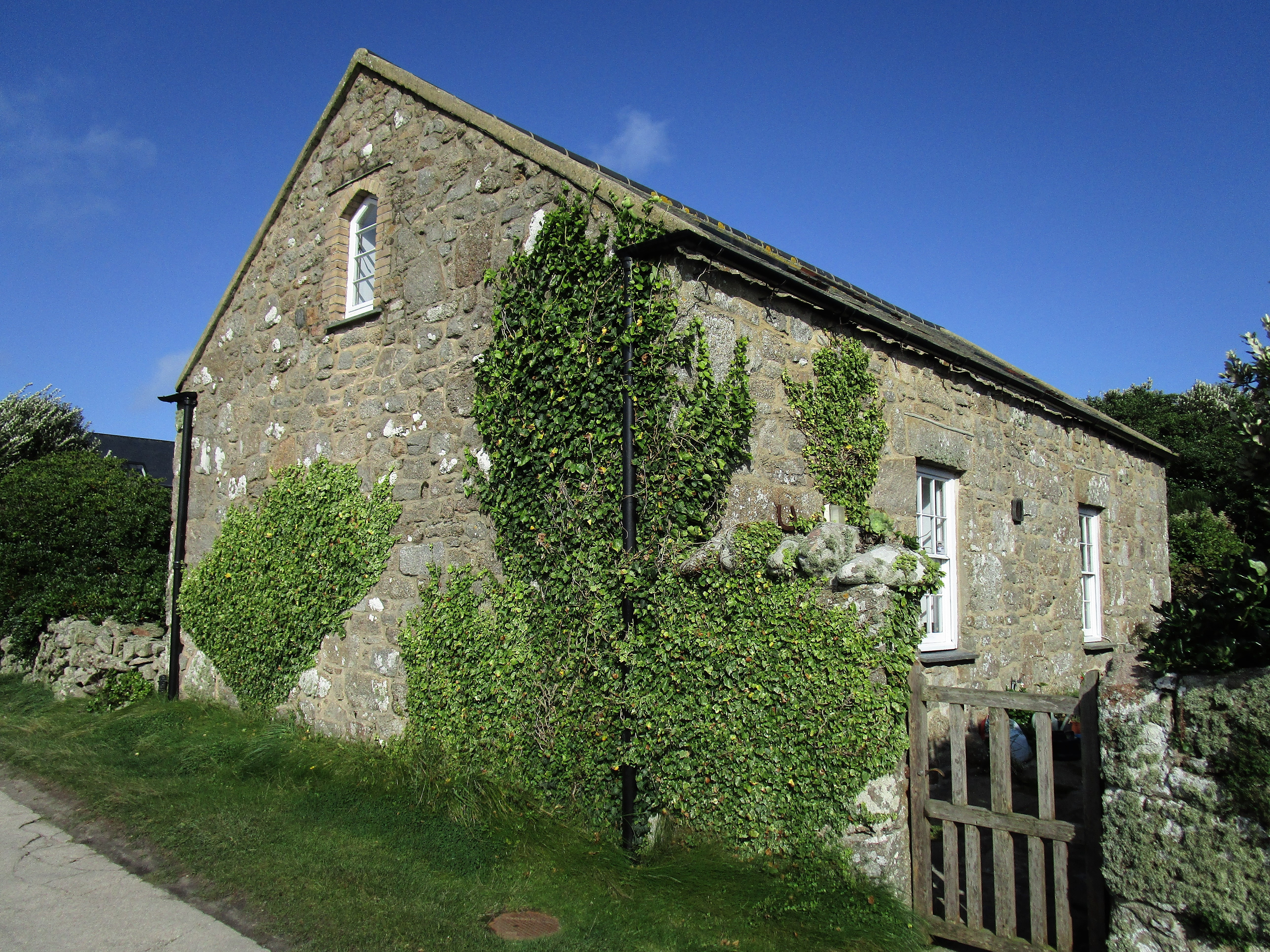
Former Bryher Baptist Church

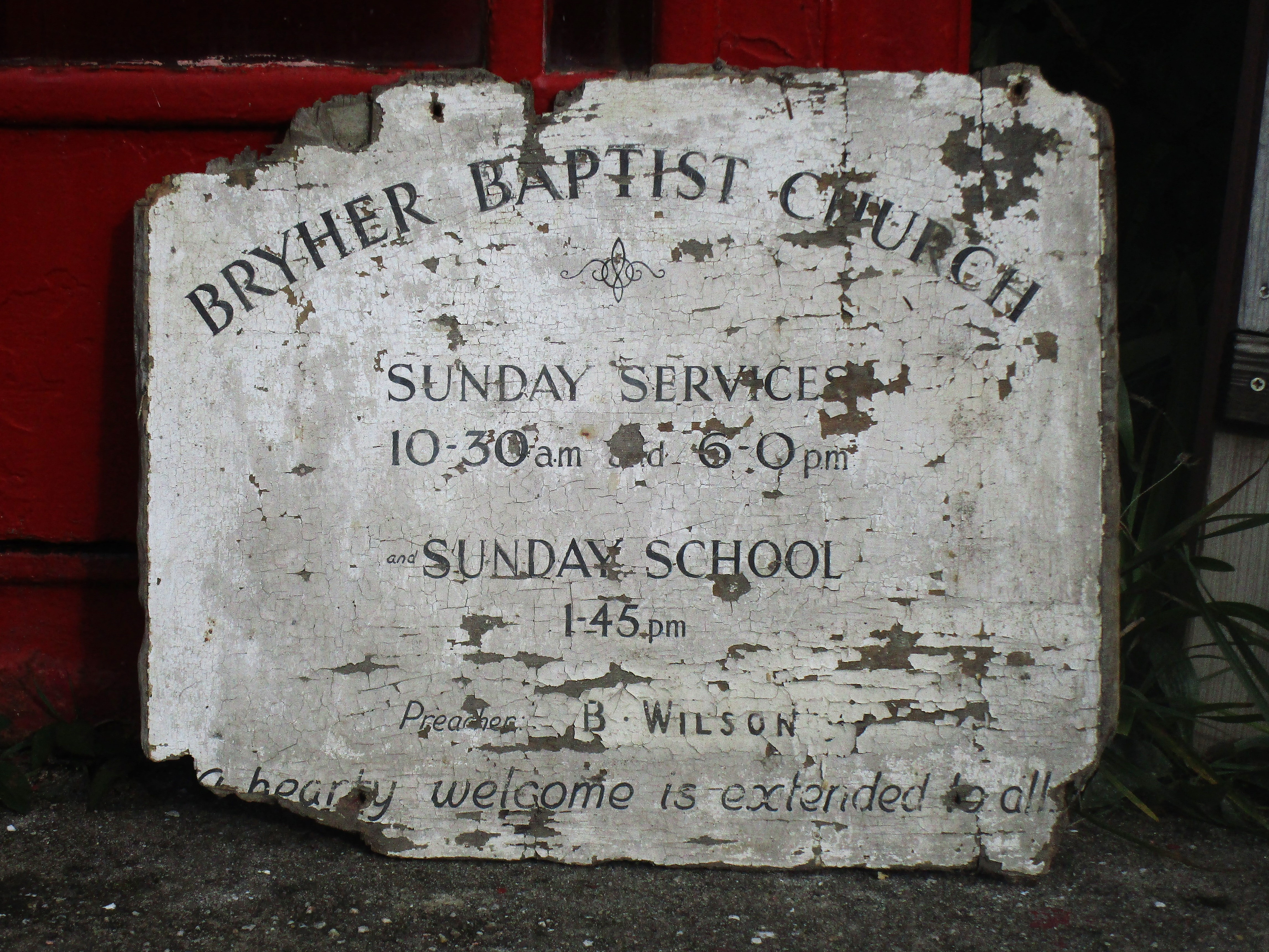
Notice board from the former Byher Baptist Church

The Baptists arrived in Scilly in the early nineteenth century. The Baptist Itinerant Aid Society established Scilly as their first missionary station, with chapels on all the inhabited islands including Bryher. Augustus Smith, "Lord Proprietor" of the Isles of Scilly, fell out with the Baptists and in 1843 "caused notice to be served at all the chapels", so they were closed. However, a new Baptist chapel was built on Bryher in 1874. It continued to be used for nearly a century, before being converted into a private house in 1972.

== Bryher's Quays ==
Bryher has two quays: Church Quay, used as the high-water quay, and Bar Quay, used as the low-water quay. The quays are used by Scilly's inter-island boats, for both passengers and freight.

Church Quay, as its name suggests, is located close to All Saints' Church, on a small promontory called "The Island", at the north end of Green Bay. There has been a quay on this site since at least the nineteenth century. The quay is shown on the OS Six-inch map published in 1889.

Bar Quay, or Anneka's Quay, located to the north of Church Quay, was originally built in 1990 by volunteers, for the television programme Challenge Anneka. It is locally known as "Bar".

The Duchy of Cornwall is responsible for both quays on Bryher.

=== Quay renovation, 2006–2008 ===
The quays on Bryher (together with quays on St Agnes and St Martins) benefited from a £3.5m Duchy of Cornwall renovation project in 2006–2008 to improve operational safety and reduce maintenance.

For all off-island quays, except Anneka's Quay, a common solution was provided: a new quay wall was built from prefabricated concrete block units, which were anchored to the bedrock using post tensioned bars and connected to the existing structure using precast deck planks.

Anneka's Quay was originally a timber deck structure support on sand filled caissons. The quay was lengthened by approximately 12m by adding two additional concrete filled caissons; the timber deck was replaced by a concrete slab.

On 2 October 2007, BBC News reported that before the renovation project it had been 50 years since any major work was done on the off-islands quays.

== Education ==
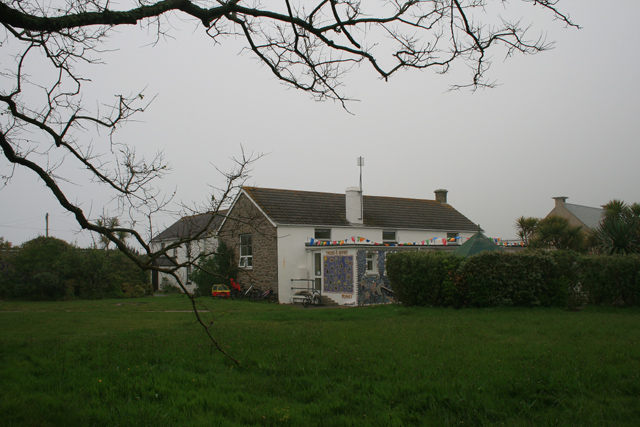
Tresco & Bryher Base in Tresco

Five Islands Academy (previously Five Islands School) has its Tresco and Bryher Base, a primary campus in Tresco. Primary pupils commute daily to Tresco, using boats. Secondary pupils board at the St Mary's main campus, staying there on weekdays and coming back and forth to their home islands on weekends.

Students at the sixth-form college level reside and board elsewhere in mainland Great Britain. Previously the Learning and Skills Council paid for costs of accommodation for sixth-formers.

== Natural history ==
There are three Sites of Special Scientific Interest (SSSI) on Bryher. The Shipman Head and Shipman Down SSSI was first designated in 1971 and covers over 40 ha of the northern part of the island. Waved maritime heath grows over shallow podzolic soils which are underlain by Hercynian granite. Rare plants include the Red Data Book (RDB) Orange Bird's-foot (Ornithopus pinnatus) and the nationally scarce Hairy Bird's-foot trefoil (Lotus subbiflorus). Lichens include (Lobaria pulmonaria) and (Teloschistes flavicans).

On the west side of the island is Great Pool which is part of the Pool of Bryher and Popplestone Bank SSSI. It is separated from the sea by a storm beach and small dune system, and is the only natural brackish lagoon on Scilly with plants such as Saltmarsh Rush (Juncus gerardii) and Beaked Tasselweed (Ruppia maritima).

Covering 12 hectares (30 acres) of the southern part of the island is the Rushy Bay and Heathy Hill SSSI which has a number of nationally rare plants. An Isles of Scilly speciality is the Dwarf Pansy (Viola kitaibeliana) which grows nowhere else in Great Britain. It is locally abundant on Bryher and thousands can be found in May in short turf and bare sand. Unfortunately a storm in 2008 reduced the numbers of plants seen; there are also small colonies on Tresco and Teän. Orange Bird's-foot, Small Adder's-tongue (Ophioglossum azoricum) and Autumn's Lady's-tresses (Spiranthes spiralis) grow on Heathy Hill.

=== Breeding birds ===
Shipman head has seven species of breeding seabirds:

- Kittiwake (Rissa tridactyla)
- Herring Gull (Larus argentatus)
- Greater Black-backed Gull (L marinus)
- Lesser Black-backed Gull (L fuscus)
- Razorbill (Alca torda)
- European Shag (Gulosus aristotelis)
- European Storm Petrel (Hydrobates pelagicus)

Ringed Plover (Charadrius hiaticula) breed on Shipman Down.

== Visiting the island ==
Varied accommodation is available on the island. There are guesthouses and self-catering cottages scattered across the island. The campsite is located close to the north end of the island overlooking both coasts. The Hell Bay Hotel is located close to the coast on the west side.

Boat services are provided by Tresco Boat Services. Two quays are used (depending on tides) by boats which take tourists between Bryher and other islands, including St Mary's and Tresco. On some low tides it is possible to walk between Bryher and Tresco and even Samson, the uninhabited island to the south. There is also safe anchorage for small yachts in the channel and Green Bay.

Local activities include boating, walking and watching wildlife.

== Culture and Media ==
=== Use in film and television ===
In 1989, the island was used for some of the scenes in the BBC's television adaptation of The Voyage of the Dawn Treader.

When the Whales Came was made on location in 1989 and starred Helen Mirren, Helen Pearce, Paul Scofield and David Suchet.

=== In fiction ===
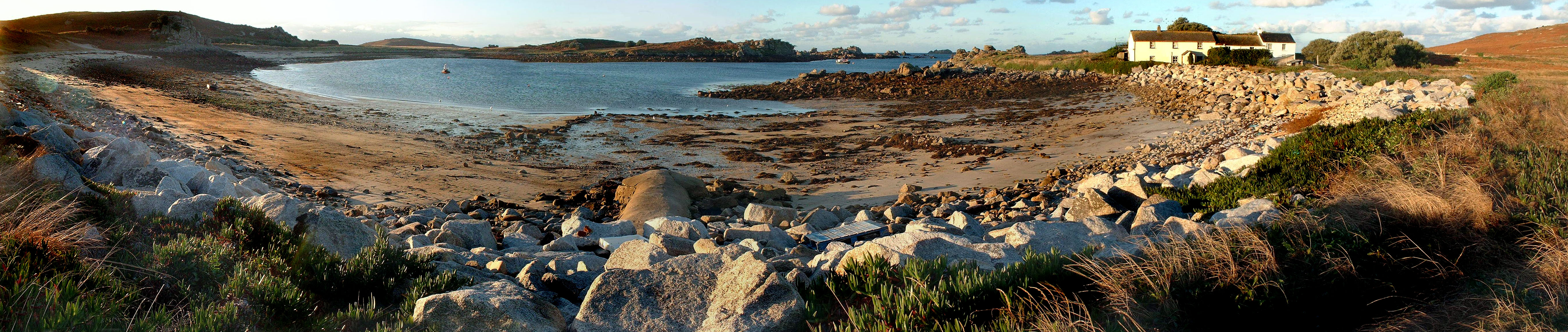
Great Par, Bryher

Bryher features in various books: The Wreck of the Zanzibar, The Sleeping Sword, Why the Whales Came and Listen to the Moon, all by Michael Morpurgo, Hell Bay by Sam Llewellyn, Hell Bay by Kate Rhodes and The Old Success by Martha Grimes

=== "Bryher" as a name ===
Annie Winifred Ellerman, daughter of the UK's wealthiest man Sir John Ellerman, took the name Bryher as her pen name in the early 20th century.

== See also ==
- Listed buildings in Bryher, Isles of Scilly
- List of shipwrecks of the Isles of Scilly
- List of extreme points of the United Kingdom
