= Burnt Island =

Burnt Island or Burnt Islands may refer to:

== Canada ==
- Burnt Island, Ontario, community on Manitoulin Island in Lake Huron
- Burnt Islands, Newfoundland and Labrador, community on the island of Newfoundland, Canada

== United Kingdom ==
- Burnt Island, Bermuda, located in Paget Parish
- Burnt Island, Isles of Scilly, Cornwall
- Burnt Islands, group of three islands in the Kyles of Bute, Scotland

== See also ==
- Burntisland, town in Fife, Scotland
- Burntisland (Parliament of Scotland constituency), pre-1707
- Burnt Island Tickle, Newfoundland and Labrador, settlement in Canada
