= Why the Whales Came =

2004 British children's novel

- First edition cover
- Author: Michael Morpurgo
- Language: English
- Genre: Children's novel
- Publisher: William Heinemann
- Publication date: 1985
- Publication place: United Kingdom
- Media type: Print
- Pages: 139
- ISBN: 0-434-95200-1
- OCLC: 20723532

Why the Whales Came is a British children's story written by Michael Morpurgo. It was first published in 1985 in the United Kingdom by William Heinemann, and by Scholastic in the United States. It is set on the island of Bryher, one of the Isles of Scilly, off the coast of Cornwall, in the year 1914. In 1989, It was adapted into the film When the Whales Came, and in 2001 it was adapted into a stage play.

== Plot ==
'Why the Whales Came' is about ten-year-old Gracie Jenkins, who lives on Bryher, an island in the Isles of Scilly off the southwestern coast of Cornwall, in the year 1914. "You keep away from the Birdman," Gracie's Father had warned her. The Birdman lives alone in a cottage that stands all by itself on a hill in the south part of the island. Gracie's father knows stories about him that he thinks are too horrible to tell her. The Birdman used to live on Samson Island, which people say has a curse on it.

Gracie and her friend Daniel have a fleet of toy boats they have made. When the lake where they usually sail the boats is taken over by bad-tempered swans, Daniel talks Gracie into coming with him to a cove near the Birdman's cottage. She's scared, but she finally agrees. Soon they find themselves on the most frightening adventure of their lives. Gracie's father also goes to war and is reported missing in action.

The whales in the novel are narwhals, a type of whale with a long, spiralling horn on the front of its head. In their adventure, Gracie and Daniel find a narwhal's horn. Later, they have to decide whether to help a stranded narwhal. They then rescue the narwhal. Later, the Birdman comes back to Bryher, and he is welcomed back by everybody.

== Characters ==
- Gracie Jenkins — Gracie believes any story told to her about the Birdman.
- Daniel Pender — Daniel is a handy boy, adventurous and social.
- Zachariah Woodcock — A deaf old man that lives in a cottage away from all the island people also known as the Birdman.
- Peter Jenkins — The father of Gracie, he has a slightly angry personality in the story.
- Clemmie Jenkins — The mother of Gracie who possesses a calm but weird personality.
- Mr. Wellbeloved — Gracie and Daniel's teacher who judges every student by arithmetic.
- Big Tim Pender — Tim is a bully to Gracie and Daniel, and is Daniel's brother.
- The Preventative — A group of people that want to take driftwood from the island.

== Background ==
Morpurgo said the inspiration for the novel came from a trip to the Isles of Scilly. He explained how he became stranded overnight on a deserted island, and that "ruined cottages stood here and there, empty, and the well I found was completely dry". He recalls that a boat came and picked him up the next day, and later, "a woman told me that the island I'd seen was 'cursed and haunted' in the aftermath of a shipwreck, and she proceeded to relate a story much like the Birdman's". Morpurgo then added the narwhals to complete the story.

== Reviews ==
Cindy Darling from the School Library Journal said the books "masterful use of parallelism heightens the sense of drama, and Morpurgo's language is lean, yet lyrical; his descriptive paragraphs let readers taste the salt of the sea and feel the grit of the islander's lives". British writer Daniel Hahn wrote in The Oxford Companion to Children's Literature, that "set amidst the hardship of living on a small island, with a story that encompasses all the fear people felt in 1914, local legend, the power of guilt, and the strength of friendship, this is one of Morpurgo's most powerful and emotional books".

== Film adaption ==
In 1989, the novel was adapted into a British drama film titled When the Whales Came, directed by Clive Rees. The movie stars, Helen Mirren, Paul Scofield, David Suchet, Barbara Jefford, David Threlfall, John Hallam, Barbara Ewing, Jeremy Kemp and Dexter Fletcher. Variety said in their review that the film "is a slight story beautifully dressed to give the appearance of more substance. Performances, direction and design are all first-rate, but there is the overwhelming sensation that there is a lot less there then meets the eye".

== Play adaption ==
In 2001 it was adapted into a stage play by Greg Banks and Nikki Sved of Theatre Alibi, which had its debut at the Midlands Arts Centre. In 2003, British theatre critic Lyn Gardner reviewed the Theatre Alibi production when it played at the West End theatre. She opined that "as in the best stage adaptations, the raw material is very good, the playing style is very simple - the precariousness of the children's misadventure on a foggy sea at night is brilliantly evoked with a seesaw plank of wood - and a comic interlude in which the islanders get the better of the law is ingeniously handled". She summed up her review by stating, "it doesn't make you feel that you've 'done the book', but leaves you wanting to return to it afresh". In 2005, it was adapted into a dramatisation for BBC Radio 4. Danyah Miller also adapted the novel into a one-woman stage play, which toured the UK and played a limited season at Ovalhouse in London in 2016.
