= Crim Rocks =

Islands in the Isles of Scilly, United Kingdom

An Creeban
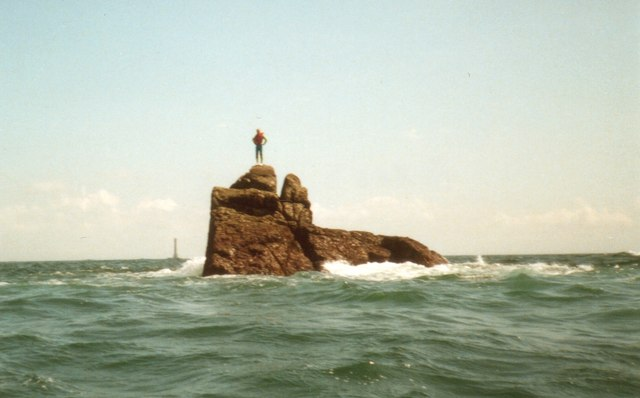
- Peaked Rock, one of the Crim Rocks, and the westernmost point of England

- Location within Isles of Scilly

Geography
- Coordinates: 49.8967°N 6.4500°W
- OS grid reference: SV802092
- Archipelago: Isles of Scilly

Administration
- United Kingdom
- Civil parish: Bryher

Demographics
- Population: 0

Crim Rocks (Cornish: Kribyn "little reef") is a small group of uninhabited islands in the Isles of Scilly, England, United Kingdom.

The Crim Rocks are the most westward of the archipelago's Western Rocks, therefore making them the westernmost point of England. They are approximately 1.5 miles (2.4 km) north of Bishop Rock, and about 0.25 miles (0.40 km) southwest of Zantman's Rock. The name may be cognate with the Middle Welsh "crimp" meaning "shin, ridge, or ledge." The most conspicuous of the Crim Rocks is the Peaked Rock. At least thirty ships are known to have been wrecked on the Crims.

== See also ==
- List of shipwrecks of the Isles of Scilly
- List of extreme points of the United Kingdom
