= Listed buildings in Bryher =

Bryher is a civil parish in the Isles of Scilly, Cornwall, England. It contains four buildings that are recorded in the National Heritage List for England as designated listed buildings, all of which are listed at Grade II. This grade is the lowest of the three gradings given to listed buildings and is applied to "buildings of national importance and special interest". The listed buildings consist of a church, a former house, and a former farmhouse with its brewhouse.

== Buildings ==
Name and location	Photograph	Date	Notes
All Saints' Church; 49.95261°N 6.35116°W		1821-22	Originally built in 1742, rebuilt in 1821-22, renovated in 1860-61, with alterations of 1897-98 and a new roof of 1930. Roughly coursed granite rubble with slate roofs. Rectangular single-cell plan with narrowed sanctuary end and south west tower. The tower is in two stages and has a pyramidal roof with a cross on the apex. At the east end are two lancet windows, the other windows having semicircular heads.
The Forge; 49.95116°N 6.35361°W	—	18th century	Originally a house, later used as an outbuilding, it is in granite with a pantile roof. The building is in a single storey and two bays, with a central doorway.
Veronica Farmhouse; 49.95075°N 6.35323°W	—	Early 19th century	The former farmhouse was extended later in the 19th century. It is in granite with slate roofs, and has two storeys and a four-bay front. Most of the windows are sashes, with one casement window in the upper floor.
Brewhouse; 49.95063°N 6.35320°W	—	19th century	The brewhouse is associated with Veronica Farmhouse. It is built in granite with a pantile roof, and is in a single storey with a loft. There is a doorway with a window to the left, and another window in the loft.
