= Zantman's Rock =

Island in the Isles of Scilly

- Location within Isles of Scilly

Geography
- Coordinates: 49.9006°N 6.4519°W
- OS grid reference: SV804096
- Archipelago: Isles of Scilly

Administration
- United Kingdom
- Civil parish: Bryher

Demographics
- Population: 0

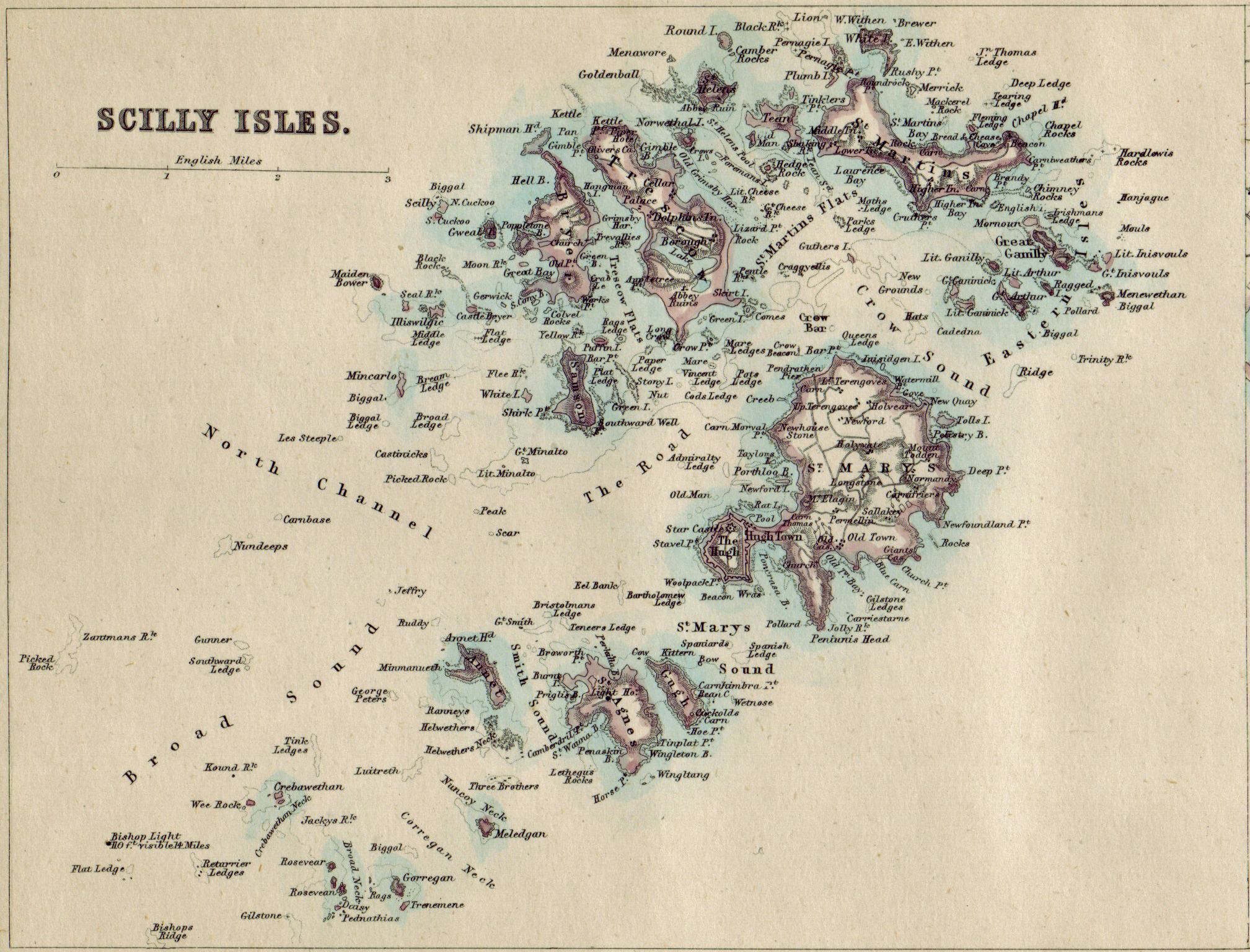
Map of Isles of Scilly Zantman's Rock near left margin

Zantman's Rock is located 34 miles (55 km) to the west of Land's End, Cornwall, and 6 miles (9.7 km) west from the Isles of Scilly. Viewed from a distance, it is barely visible on the surface of the waters. It is 2 miles (3.2 km) north of Bishop Rock Lighthouse, and about 0.25 miles (0.40 km) northeast of the Crim Rocks.

The name "Zantman's Rock" is recorded on an Admiralty chart of 1860. Before then, it appears not to have been distinguished from the Crim Rocks a short distance to the southwest. Several legends attempt to explain the name of the rock, one of which involves a Dutchman being shipwrecked and finding himself in the unlikely position of clinging on to the rock.

Zantman's Rock has been the cause of at least one famous shipwreck: that of the Susanna, on 14 August 1913. The wreckage still lies on the southwestern side of Zantman's Rock.

== See also ==
- List of shipwrecks of the Isles of Scilly
