= Danyah Miller =

English Storyteller

- Education: Bretton Hall College; L'École Internationale de Théâtre Jacques Lecoq
- Occupations: Storyteller, writer, theatre producer
- Years active: 1980s–present
- Known for: I Believe in Unicorns, Perfectly Imperfect Women
- Notable work: Seven Secrets of Spontaneous Storytelling (2023)

Danyah Miller is an English storyteller, writer and theatre producer.

== Biography ==
Miller trained in drama, dance and English at Bretton Hall College from 1983 to 1986 and L'École Internationale de Théâtre Jacques Lecoq from 2002 to 2003. Her first job was as a front of house usher at the Theatre Royal, Drury Lane.

Miller was the first female front of house manager for Stoll Moss Theatres in 1986, Marketing Manager at the Soho Poly Theatre, General Manager at the Shaftesbury Theatre, and Chief Executive of the Everyman Theatre, Cheltenham. She was included in Debrett's People of Today from 1989 for her contribution to British society.

Miller founded theatre production company Wizard Presents in 1999 with her husband John Miller. They produced musicals including All You Need is Love, featuring more than 50 Lennon & McCartney songs, and Soul Sister, which opened at the Hackney Empire for a limited run before transferring to the Savoy Theatre in August 2012. The musical was nominated for 2013 Laurence Olivier Award for Best New Musical. The production also toured the UK in 2013.

The musical production of Pippi Longstocking played a limited season at Royal and Derngate Northampton in December 2019

== Storytelling ==
Miller was a regular storyteller on BBC Three Counties Radio for three years and a course leader at The School of Storytelling in East Sussex. Her storytelling tips were published by The Guardian in 2014.

In 2013 Miller adapted and performed I Believe in Unicorns by Michael Morpurgo for the stage with director Dani Parr, produced by Wizard Presents. The production debuted at the Edinburgh Festival Fringe, The Pleasance Courtyard in 2013. It toured the UK and transferred to the Vaudeville Theatre in the West End for limited runs in 2014 and 2015. In 2023 the production played the Lyric Theatre for a gala performance in aid of The Reading Agency and the Apollo Theatre for a limited run. Reviews for the show were positive. Victoria Segal in her review for The Sunday Times wrote "keeping small children in their seats takes magic and wonder, qualities that 'I Believe in Unicorns' has in abundance." Neil Norman for The Daily Express commented that "Miller delivers a one-woman show that is pure storytelling, pure theatre and pure magic." I Believe in Unicorns won the Argus Angel Award for Artistic excellence at the Brighton Festival 2014 and the Audience Choice Award for Best Family Welcome at the Get Creative Family Arts Festival 2015 awards.

Miller also adapted and performed Why the Whales Came by Michael Morpurgo, which toured the UK and played a limited season at Ovalhouse in London in 2016. She wrote and performed Perfectly Imperfect Women which opened at Ovalhouse and ran at Edinburgh Festival Fringe, Pleasance Courtyard 2017.

Kika's Birthday by John and Danyah Miller opened at Orange Tree Theatre in December 2017. The production transferred to Little Angel Theatre and Edinburgh Festival Fringe, Pleasance Courtyard in 2018.

Miller adapted and narrated an audio version of The Secret Garden by Frances Hodgson Burnett as part of The Secret Garden Experience in 2021 produced by Wizard Presents with Watford Palace Theatre and Oxford Playhouse.

== Writing ==
Miller's first book, Seven Secrets of Spontaneous Storytelling, was published by Hawthorn Press in November 2023. Her stage script of Michael Morpurgo's I Believe in Unicorns, co-adapted with Dani Parr, was published by Oberon Books in 2015.
