= List of shipwrecks of the Isles of Scilly =

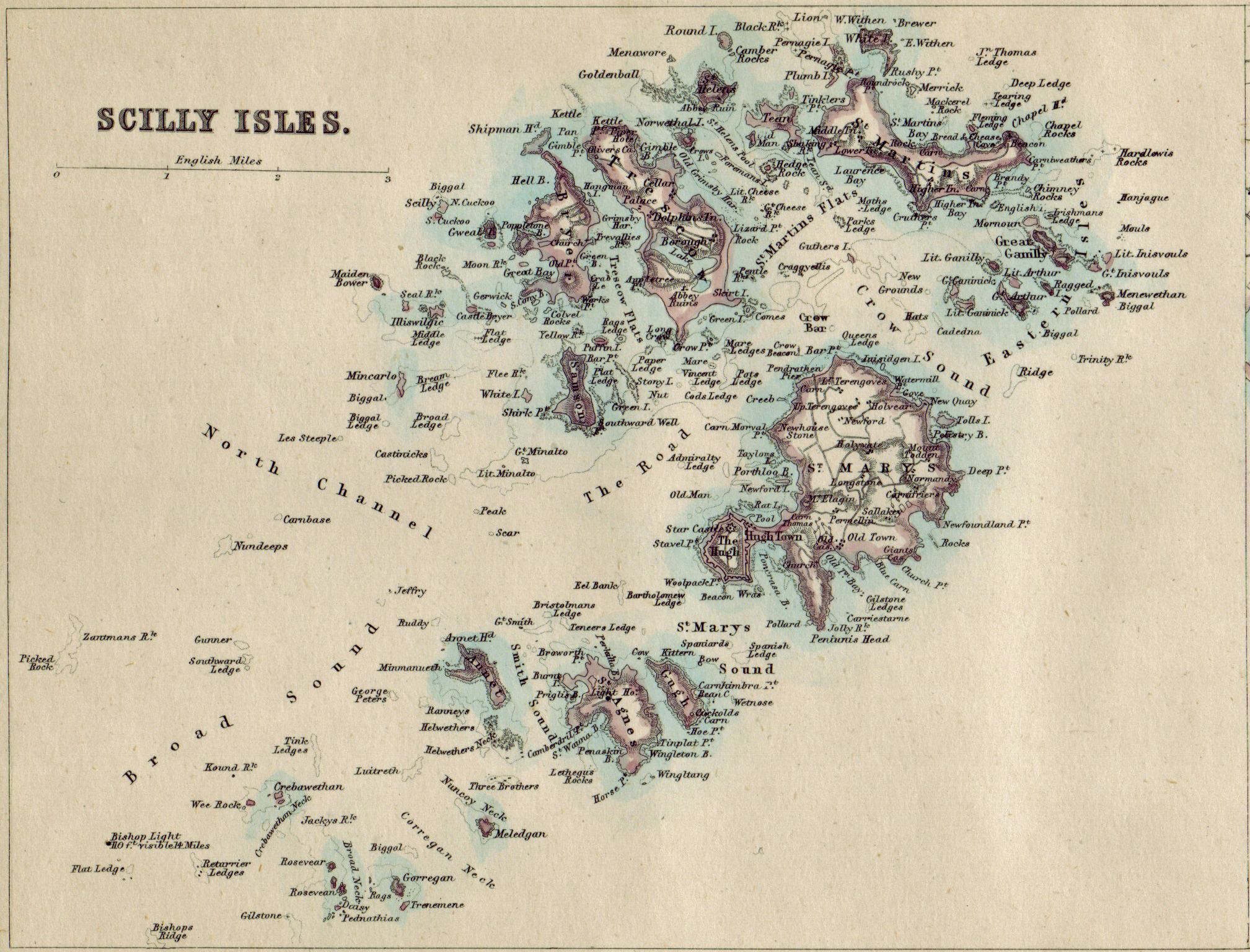
Map of the Isles of Scilly

The list of shipwrecks of the Isles of Scilly is a list of ships which sank on or near the Isles of Scilly. The list includes ships that sustained a damaged hull, which were later refloated and repaired.

== Before 1601 ==
=== 1305 ===
- an unnamed sailing vessel wrecked on Tresco. The Coroner, William le Poer, on the island to take charge of the salvaged cargo, was ″seized by the mob″ led by Randulph de Blancminster, Lord of the Manor, and imprisoned until he was able to purchase his freedom.

=== 1555 ===
- unidentified Spanish or Spanish–Netherlands vessel on Bartholomew Ledge. The oldest wreck site in the Isles of Scilly protected under the Protection of Wrecks Act 1973.

=== 1597 ===
- February – the Spanish Fleet of Indies galleon San Bartolomé (Spain) was lost within the Isles of Scilly. She was carrying lead ingots and fragments of bronze bells. (Note: may refer to 1555 wreck above.)

== 1601–1700 ==
=== 1616 or 1617 ===
- a ship (England) equipped by Sir Walter Raleigh at his own expense sank in a gale whilst outward bound to Guiana seeking gold. A small Elizabethan shipwreck fitting the size and description of this ship was found by Todd Stevens in St Marys Roadstead which could be the remains of this vessel- the Fly boat "Flying Joan".

=== 1617 ===
- the pinnace Supply (Kingdom of England) of the East India Company was driven aground on the Western Rocks whilst homeward bound from Bantam to London. Men and goods saved and she made a second voyage to Java in 1621 and reported as laid up, there, in 1623.

=== 1636 ===
- 24 March – sailing ship Gift of God (Kingdom of Scotland) of Kirkcaldy was wrecked.

=== 1641 ===
- 23 September – the Dartmouth based Merchant Royal (Kingdom of England) foundered between Land's End, Cornwall and the Isles of Scilly.

=== 1645 ===
- July – the Royalist vessel John ran ashore after a skirmish with three Parliamentary ships. She was the flagship of the pirate John Mucknell. For more information about this wreck Read the book 'Pirate John Mucknell' by Todd Stevens.

=== 1651 ===
- Two unidentified Royalist frigates anchored under Hugh Hill (now the Garrison) and blockading St Mary's was driven ashore in a storm and thought to be total wrecks (not confirmed by research).

=== 1665 ===
- 18 January – while on her first voyage home from the Moluccas and Bantam to London, the East Indiaman ship Royal Oak ( British East India Company) was lost (probably) on Pednathise Head in the Western Rocks. Some of the crew managed to abandon ship and took to a ″low rock″ where they were rescued fifty-two hours later. She was carrying peppercorns, cloth and porcelain.

=== 1667 ===
- 22 December (first report) – three ships lost near Scilly.
- (first report) – unidentified vessel (Spain) wrecked at an unknown location. A passenger complained that he was left on a rock for one or two days while the cargo was salvaged, saying "Valuing the goods more than my life".

=== 1668 ===
- 11 December – sixth-rate Hind (Royal Navy) lost on Crim rocks.

=== 1670 ===
- 21 August (first report) – "A great ship has been lost about the Scillies, the afterpart of a wreck has been found."

=== 1680 ===
- 11 January – East India Company ship Phoenix carrying white pepper and cloth wrecked on the Western Rocks. Much of the cargo was salvaged and sold on Scilly to Thomas Abney who paid £202 8s 1d for 269 pieces of Peerlongs.

=== 1681 ===
- December – A cargo vessel (Kingdom of England) wrecked off St Agnes. The lighthouse keeper on St Agnes was found guilty of negligence for being inattentive to the light and for plundering some of the cargo.

=== 1686 ===
- February – Vereenigde Oostindische Compagnie ship, Prinses Maria sank in shallow water near Silver Carn, north of Santaspery Neck within the Western Rocks. King James II sent his yacht to salvage some of the cargo and in 1973 a diving team recovered real coins, iron cannon and timbers.

== 1701–1800 ==
=== unknown year ===
- a French seventy–four gun ship was wrecked on the Western Rocks whilst making an attempt to invade the islands, an accompanying frigate managed to evade the rocks and return to France.

=== 1707 ===
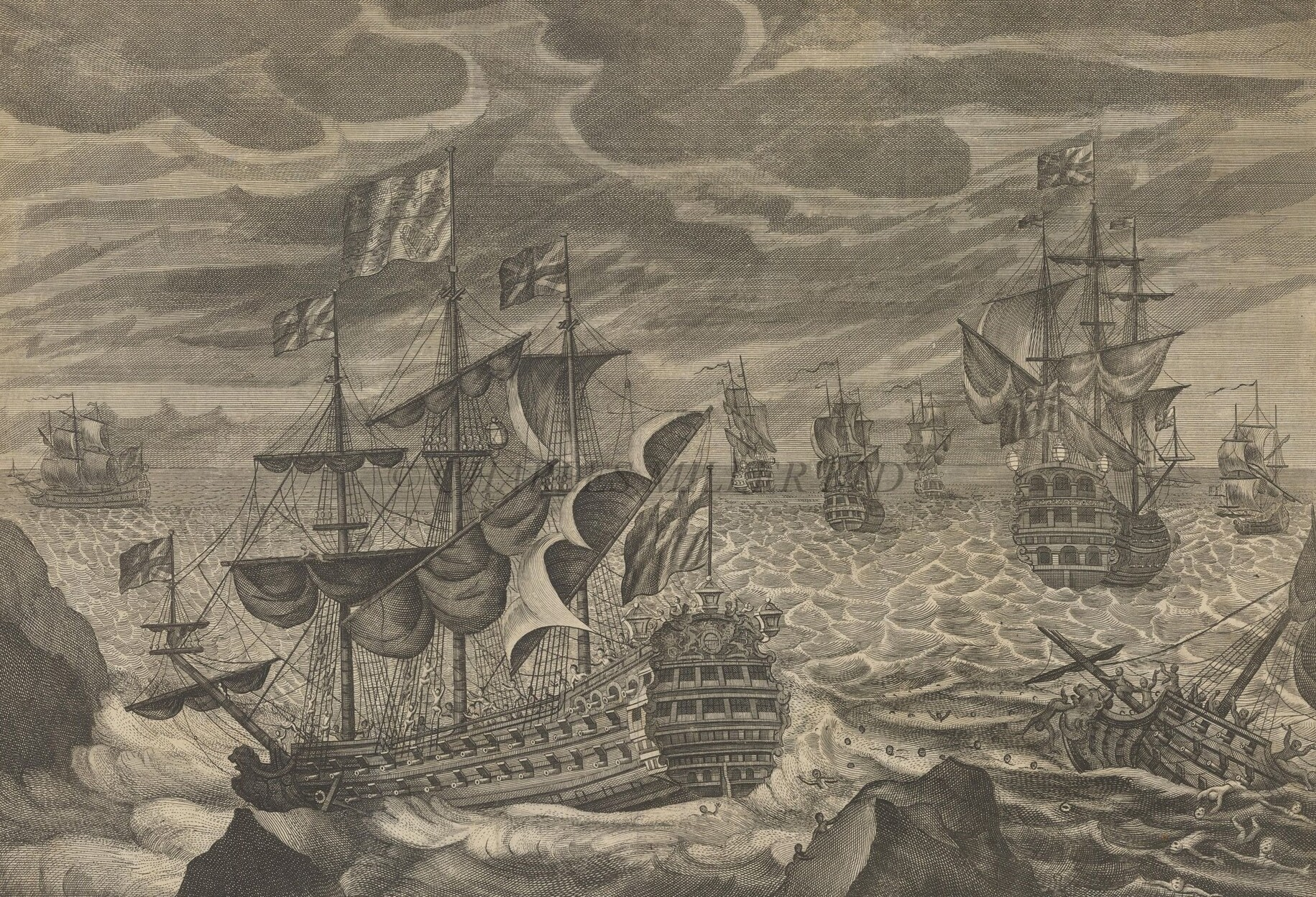
The Scilly naval disaster of 1707

- 22 October – HMS Association, HMS Eagle, HMS Romney and HMS Firebrand (all (Kingdom of Great Britain) Royal Navy) with the loss of nearly 2,000 souls; HMS Phoenix ( (Kingdom of Great Britain) Royal Navy) sustained a damaged hull but was later refloated and repaired (see Scilly naval disaster of 1707).

=== 1720 ===
- a Dutch ship lost on Great Wingletang Rock, St Agnes along with her cargo and crew.

=== 1727 ===
- William and Mary from Jamaica

=== 1730 ===
- a ship carrying wine from the Canary Islands was wrecked on or near Rosevean. The master and a crewman were lashed to a rock for three days before rescue.

=== 1733 ===
- unknown ship carrying mahogany from the Bay of Honduras to London went ashore on Melledgan. Only the captain and one crew managed to get away on a raft and drifted to Kitten Rock, north of Gugh where they were picked up days later.

=== 1736 ===
- 9 October – The Triumph from Jamaica carrying 500 hogshead of sugar and a large quantity of rum.

=== 1737 ===
- a Dutch ship was wrecked in Wingletang Bay, St Agnes in a south-east gale. The master and one of the crew were lost.

=== 1738 ===
- November – the Diana (Kingdom of France) of Calais wrecked on Mincarlo.

=== 1739 ===
- 30 December – Mermaid (Kingdom of Great Britain) of Plymouth wrecked on Crow Bar.

=== 1742 ===
- 9 March – Nancy carrying Bristol compound spirits, hemp, iron and gunpowder caught fire and blew up in New Grimsby. There was damage to several ships in the vicinity.

=== 1743 ===
- 13 July – Dutch East India Company cargo ship VOC Hollandia, on her maiden voyage and bound from Amsterdam to Batavia, wrecked on the Gunner Rock, near Annet with the loss of 276 souls. In 1971 Rex Cowan found the wreck, a large quantity of silver coins, along with bronze cannons and mortars.

=== 1748 ===
- 27 February – HMS Lizard ( (Kingdom of Great Britain) Royal Navy wrecked on the Seven Stones reef with the loss of one hundred lives in 1747.

=== 1750 ===
- unknown date – a large unidentified sailing vessel lost in the Gilstone area.

=== 1752 ===
- a Dutchman carrying cotton from Smyrna in Turkey wrecked on Rosevean. There were no survivors.

=== 1753 ===
- 20 May – the Johanna stranded at Little Smith, St Agnes; accounts differ as to year of loss and voyage details. Either registered at (or left) Topsham for Swansea or from the Isle of Wight for Liverpool. or en route from South Shields to Liverpool.

=== 1758 ===
- 30 December – the Furnace bound for Gosport with a cargo of brandy, oil, prunes, rosin and pewter wrecked on Broad Ledge near Guther's Island. Most of her cargo was saved by locals and Custom officers.

=== 1759 ===
- January – while bound for Barcelona from London and Falmouth the Vincento Farea was lost at Scilly.
- 23 February – schooner Anna Adriana wrecked at Scilly with the loss of her crew and cargo.

=== 1760 ===
- a ″Dutchman″ was lost on the rock Biggal of Melledgan. She was carrying wine and paper.

=== 1762 ===
- a French vessel was wrecked on Rosevean; six of the eighteen crew survived by clinging to floating timbers.

=== 1764 ===
- a Dutch galliot carrying wine and brandy from Bordeaux to Hamburg wrecked on the Lethegus Ledge, St Agnes. Accounts vary from no lives lost to three lives lost.
- a vessel with coal for the beacon (St Agnes lighthouse) was wrecked on Burnt Island, St Agnes.

=== 1767 ===
- 11 January – Seahorse of Newcastle, John James, Master, bound from Cadiz to London, laden with currants, cream of tartar, Spanish wool and fustick, was wrecked near Old Grimsby

=== 1771 ===
- an unidentified ship lost with all hands on Gugh (probably on the Cuckolds Ledge).

=== 1773 ===
- 25 September – snow Duke of Cumberland from Boston, Massachusetts carrying oil, lumber, deal and other timber to London wrecked north-east of St Helen's.

=== 1774 ===
- 1 February – Royd (Kingdom of Great Britain) of London was beached on rocks when she parted her cable. She was en route from Barcelona to Roscoff with brandy and wine.

=== 1776 ===
- A galliot was driven ashore while on a journey from Bordeaux to Hamburg with a cargo of coffee, sugar, indigo and wine, which was salvaged and put under lock and key. They were consequently stolen by a number of men. A Custom House boatman was sentenced to transportation for seven years and two women were acquitted.

=== 1780 ===
- 31 August – brig Tryal (Kingdom of Great Britain) of Bristol wrecked in Crow Sound en route from St Christopher with sugar.
- 20 November – while carrying Portland stone to Dublin, Weymouth brig Charming Molly (Kingdom of Great Britain) was stranded and lost on Bryher.

=== 1781 ===
- 3 March – brig Endeavour (Kingdom of Great Britain) of Liverpool was beached and lost along with her cargo of herrings, coal, rum and brandy. She was bound for Portsmouth from her home port.
- an unidentified Venetian ship was wrecked on Crebawethan. She was out of Marseille carrying Castille soap, wine almonds and oil for London. Eleven of her crew escaped the wreck by holding on to a mast which carried them to New Grimsby on Tresco.

=== 1782 ===
- 2 February – a British cargo ship the Lady Johanna (Kingdom of Great Britain) wrecked at Little Smith, St Agnes. The cargo of cotton and rum was salvaged and taken to Plymouth whilst the wreck was sold and broken up. Note: this is a different ship to the wreck on Little Smith in 1753.
- 14 July – cargo ship the Madonna de Carmine (Republic of Venice) hit the Golden Ball Bar, west of St Helen's. Bound from Rotterdam to Smyrna with cloth, the crew sold some of the cargo in order to pay for their passage to Falmouth. No lives lost. A scheduled monument and also referred to as Madonna de Carminic.
- an unidentified Venetian ship was wrecked on Crebawethan. She was out of Marseille carrying Castille soap, wine almonds and oil for London. Eleven of her crew escaped the wreck by holding on to a mast which carried them to New Grimsby on Tresco.

=== 1783 ===
- 24 January – brig Oldenburger carrying a general cargo from St Vincent to Ostend went ashore on Tresco in New Grimsby harbour.
- 31 July – Agnetta wrecked.
- 4 September – the Financier bound for London from Charlestown, Carolina with tobacco, rice and indigo hit rocks near Annet and sank. In the same hour the Nancy (see 1784 for a different ship) carrying sugar and rum from Jamaica was wrecked near St Agnes with no loss of life. A third, unnamed, ship was also believed to have been lost with all hands.
- 25 November – while bound for Liverpool from Viborg with deals the Sophia (Kingdom of Great Britain) of London stranded and sank.

=== 1784 ===
- 26 February – a New York transport vessel wrecked on the back of Bryher.
- 26 February – the packet ship Nancy, carrying actress Ann Cargill and her young child, struck the Gilstone in the Western Rocks and sank in deeper water near Rosevear Ledges. Some of the crew and passengers took to a small boat which was dashed on Rosevear killing all aboard. In total 36 crew, 12 passengers, and 1 prisoner drowned. For lots more information on this wreck read book 'Ghosts of Rosevear' by Ed Cumming & Todd Stevens.
- 31 December – the Aurora struck a sunken rock off Land's End and made it to the Isles of Scilly finally sinking in St Helen's Gap. Cargo salvaged and she was refloated.

=== 1786 ===
- 24 December – brigantine Duke of Cornwall (Kingdom of Great Britain) of Penzance hit the Bartholomew Ledge and was beached on St Agnes. She was the Duke of Cornwall's private tin ship and was carrying a general cargo from London for Falmouth and Penzance, in the teeth of a violent gale. The crew were saved but little of her cargo was retrieved for the proprietors.
- 24 December – brig Betsy (Kingdom of Great Britain) from Chester, and heading for London, was lost between the Bartholomew Ledge and Perconger, St Agnes. She was carrying lead blocks and empty casks.
- 24 December – Dowson (Kingdom of Great Britain) from Leverpool (Liverpool) lost on the Isles of Scilly in a gale.
- 24 December – an unidentified sloop sank on the Isles of Scilly.
- 24 December – an unidentified brig sank on the Isles of Scilly.

=== 1788 ===
- 7 June – an unnamed Virginian (United States) lost in the Gilstone area of the Western Rocks.

=== 1789 ===
- 24 March – Ann wrecked.

=== 1790 ===
- 5 June – brigantine Eagle of Charlestown carrying tobacco, rice and staves went ashore near St Agnes.
- 8 July – the 28-gun, sixth rate, HMS Pegasus ( (Kingdom of Great Britain) Royal Navy) ) went ashore on Annet and refloated on the flood tide undamaged.
- 20 April – the Elizabeth of London (Kingdom of Great Britain) with a cargo of salt from Alicante wrecked under Tinklers Hill, St Martin's. She was originally seen with a broken mainmast, smashed decking and rigging trailing astern and encircled the islands three times before beaching herself.

=== 1791 ===
- April – Scilly pilot boat sunk off Old Town Bay with the loss of eleven men.

=== 1797 ===
- 10 January – Albion wrecked.
- September – The Lethe wrecked on Scilly Rocks.

=== 1798 ===
- 10 December – HMS Colossus, ( (Kingdom of Great Britain) Royal Navy) British naval vessel wrecked off Samson in St Mary's Roads. One sailor drowned. For more information on this wreck read 'Wreck of Colossus' by Todd Stevens who discovered the stern of this wreck in St Marys Roadstead.

== 1901–1914 ==
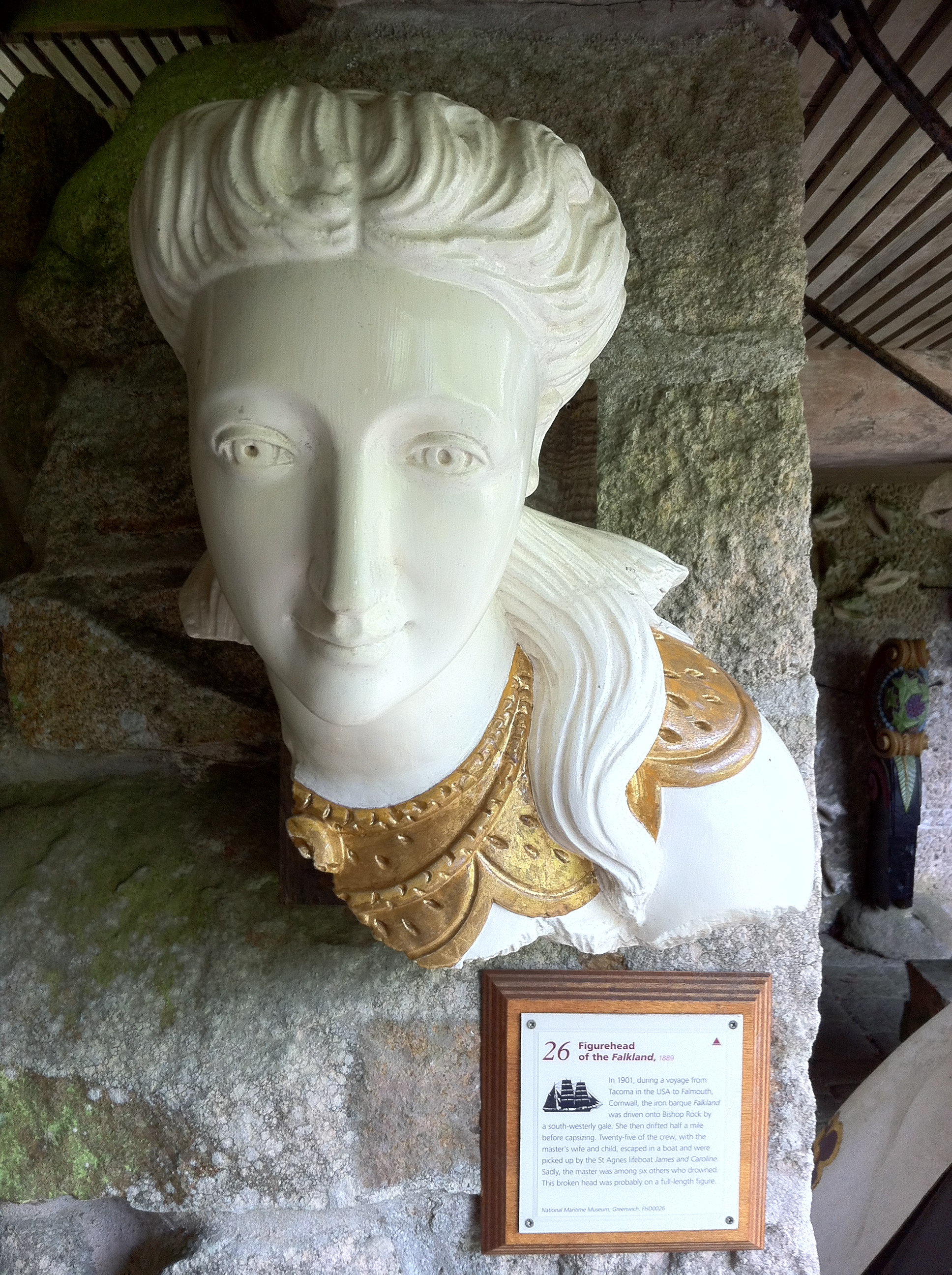
Figurehead of the Falkland in Tresco Abbey Gardens

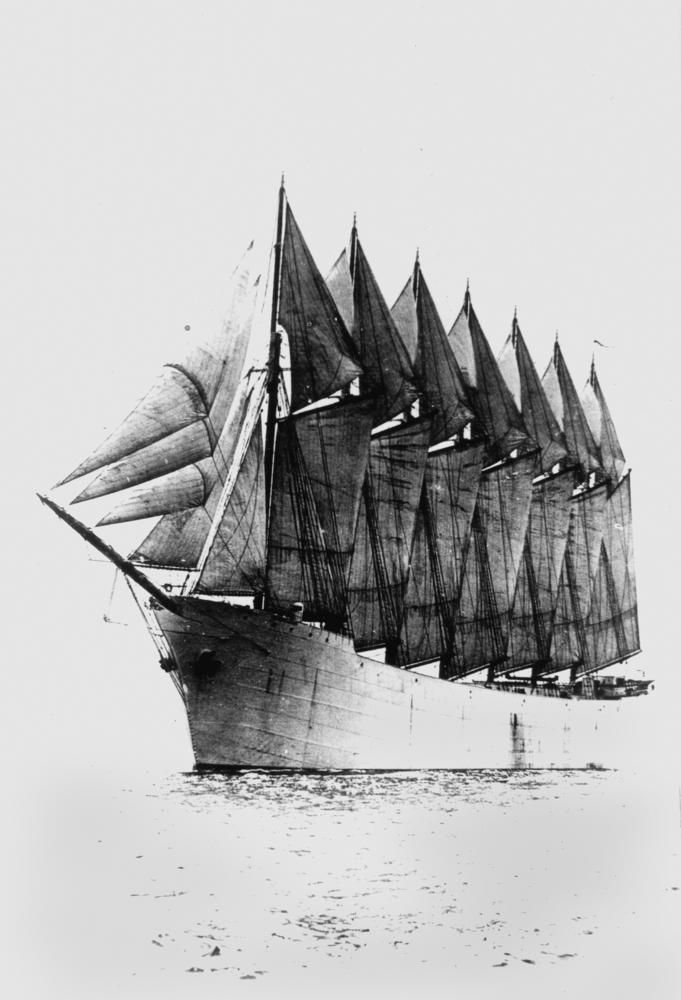
The schooner Thomas W. Lawson, world's only seven-masted ship and largest pure sailing vessel (without an auxiliary engine) ever built. Destroyed off the uninhabited island of Annet in a storm on 14 December 1907.

=== 1901 ===
- 22 June – four masted barque Falkland (United Kingdom) of Liverpool struck the Crebinacks and drifted onto the Bishop's Rock where she foundered with several of the crew drowning. Two passengers and twenty-one of the crew made it on to the ship's boat which was piloted to St Mary's by the St Agnes lifeboat.

=== 1902 ===
- 2 February – sailing ship Lofaro (Kingdom of Italy) sunk off St Martin's Head with the loss of the crew despite attempts by the gig Emperor to save them. The Lofaro figurehead is currently in the Valhalla Museum on Tresco.

=== 1903 ===
- 17 June – Newcastle steamer James Spier (United Kingdom) bound for Bastia from Liverpool was rammed in dense fog by Norwegian barque Magdelen 30 miles SSW. She lost her mizzen mast and was towed to Penzance by steam trawler Buckhound.
- 20 September – barque Queen Mab (United Kingdom) of Glasgow was 105 days out of Punta Arenas when she struck the Spanish Ledges. She was bound for Falmouth, with fustic log-wood and had passed the Wolf Rock on the 18th but was forced back by a strong, easterly gale. She was holed as she sailed over the Spanish Ledges and was then piloted by the St Agnes gig O & M to anchorage off the southern tip of Samson. Found to be taking in water, and under tow by the island's packet steamer Lyonesse, she was escorted to harbour with the assistance of the St Mary's and the St Agnes (James and Caroline) lifeboats. Thirteen local men manned the pumps for over five hours, and she made it to Hugh Town where she grounded at the harbour entrance. She was salvaged and left, on tow, for Falmouth and Le Havre on 7 October.
- 17 October – while entering Crow Sound on a journey from Glasgow to Nova Scotia with a general cargo, the Kilkeel hit the Hats. She was later refloated.

=== 1904 ===
- 13 August – HMS Decoy (Royal Navy) a Daring-class torpedo boat destroyer in collision with HMS Arun off the Isles of Scilly with the loss of one life.

=== 1906 ===
- 3 June – steam-trawler Magdalene (France) of Boulogne, despite passing on the wrong side of the buoy while entering St Mary's Roads to seek medical assistance for an injured member of crew, managed to miss the Bartholmew Ledges. When leaving for sea the following day she again took the wrong route and this time struck the Ledges and sank two hours later.
- 5 June – steam-trawler General Roberts (United Kingdom) of Hull sank after taking on water in the fishing grounds north of St Martin. Her crew abandoned ship in the punt and rowed towards Round Island.
- 22 July – 2126 ton King Line steamer King Cadwallon (United Kingdom) bound for Naples with a cargo of coal from Barry, was lost on the Hard Lewis rocks to the east of St Martin's.
- 21 August – steam-trawler Grassholm damaged her bows on Great Minalto while trying to make anchorage during thick fog. She was on passage to Cardiff with fish. St Mary's Lifeboat Henry Dundas towed her to harbour.

=== 1907 ===
- 14 December – Thomas W. Lawson (United States), the world's only seven-masted schooner going as bulk oil carrier in charter for the Anglo-American Oil Co. Bound for London from Philadelphia the huge schooner was caught in a northwest gale off the Isles of Scilly on 13 December 1907. The captain and engineer were found the following day on South Carn in the Hellweather Rocks by a gig's crew which included the son of the pilot who was out searching for his father.

=== 1909 ===
- 14 August – the Plympton struck the Lethegus' Ledge off St Agnes in thick fog. All the crew were saved but a man and boy from Hugh Town were lost when the boat went down without warning as they were unloading the cargo of grain which she was carrying from Villa Constitution to Dublin via Falmouth.

=== 1910 ===
- 18 April – SS Minnehaha, first-class liner hit Scilly Rock off Bryher in dense fog. Later refloated with no loss of life.

=== 1911 ===
- 8 January – Ardencraig (United Kingdom) off the Gunners, abandoned by the crew and foundered about three o'clock in the afternoon in the North West Channel.
- 13 January – Georges of Auray was found, by the St Mary's lifeboat Henry Dundas on the 12th, at anchor near St Agnes with a light burning but no one on board. Out from Swansea for Trinite with 170 tons of coal she lost her sails in a gale and started to leak. Her crew abandoned and landed safely on St Agnes and she sank the next morning.
- 26 March – steamship Setiembre (Spain) struck The Hats in Crow Sound and sank. She was a total loss despite her crew dumping her cargo of iron-ore overboard in an attempt to refloat her. Her boiler can still be seen above low water.

=== 1912 ===
- 8 December – steamer Antonios (Greece) lost on Old Bess with the loss of her crew. The wreck went unnoticed for three days until wreckage and thousands of oranges were washed up on St Agnes.

=== 1913 ===
- 14 August – the Susanna, on Zantman's Rock
- November – the Thornliebank, 2,105 tons of the Bank Line Limited, on a voyage from Iquique to London, wrecked on Crim Rock.

=== 1914 ===
- 23 June – Gothland struck the Crim with a ″consignment of Belgium undesirables″ deported from the USA. The passengers were landed on St Mary's and later taken to Cornwall on the Lyonesse. The Gothland was refloated.

== World War I ==
=== 1915 ===
- 1 May – neutral tanker Gulflight (United States) torpedoed by U-30, commander: Erich von Rosenberg-Gruszczynski (Imperial German Navy) and later refloated.

=== 1916 ===
- 18 May – armed auxiliary naval trawler HMT Carbineer (Royal Navy) struck one of the Crim Rocks and was run ashore at Great Crebawethan becoming a total loss.
- November – Admiralty auxiliary supply ship Brodfield (United Kingdom) went ashore at the Giant's Castle, St Mary's whilst in ballast from Le Havre to South Wales. Several attempts to refloat her were unsuccessful.

=== 1917 ===
- 11 May – two ships were wrecked on the same day during heavy fog, the SS Italia (Italy), a steam collier was wrecked on the Great Wingletang Rock off St Agnes, and the SS Lady Charlotte, another collier, was lost, shortly before, at Porth Hellick on St Mary's. The Italia was carrying coal from Cardiff to Taranto and went aground at 15:30 and quickly sank. The only witness, a St Agnes girl was not believed and the wreckage that washed up was believed to belong to the Lady Charlotte. When the crew of the Italia reached St Mary's it was assumed that she had been torpedoed somewhere off the islands, as none of the crew could speak English. The Wingletang wreck was finally identified in 1964 when her serial number was found on the ship's patent log.
- 5 October – schooner Annie F. Conlon (United States) was badly damaged by gunfire from a German submarine, and was towed to Crow Sound, where she began to break up. Her cargo of 455 casks of oil made £1,406 9s for her owners Marine Transport of Mobile, Alabama.
- 6 December – USS Jacob Jones (United States Navy), American destroyer was hit in the stern by a torpedo while on convoy duty. She exploded killing her crew and sank within eight minutes 25 miles SE of the Bishop Rock.

=== 1918 ===
- 10 November – Admiralty tug Blazer (United Kingdom) struck the Garrison. All her crew of 24 survived.

== 1918–1939 ==
=== 1920 ===
- 2 December – SS Hathor (Germany) wrecked on the Lethurges to the south of St Agnes. After breaking down near the Azores she was taken under tow by two German tugs who abandoned her in a gale off Scilly after the tow broke. Her crew was saved by lifeboat Elsie ( Royal National Lifeboat Institution). She lies on the wreck of the Plympton which sank on 14 August 1909.

=== 1921 ===
- 11 July – SS The Western Front (United States) foundered several miles west of the Isles of Scilly when she caught fire after an explosion. She was carrying 7,000 tons of naval stores, including naphtha, turpentine and resin from Jacksonville to London. One member of crew lost his life.

=== 1925 ===
- 21 March – steam-trawler Cité de Verdun (France) struck Rosevear in a snowstorm. The crew of thirty landed, lit a fire and sent distress signals which were answered by the St Mary's lifeboat, Elsie ( Royal National Lifeboat Institution). The nameboards of the trawler can still be seen in the Mermaid and Atlantic public houses on St Mary's.
- 12 June – steam-trawler Europe (France) of Boulogne struck Rosevear in fog. As the tide rose the trawler floated off the rocks and made for Dunkirk with slight damage.

=== 1927 ===
- 27 October – SS Isabo (Italy) with a cargo of grain foundered on Scilly Rock, west of Bryher. Three small boats Czar, Ivy and Sunbeam saved thirty-one men. Conditions deteriorated by the time lifeboat Elsie ( Royal National Lifeboat Institution) arrived and she had to leave four men clinging to the rigging, returning the next day to pick them up along with one on the Scilly Rock. (The account of the rescue differs with twenty-eight or thirty-six men saved out of a crew of thirty-eight).
- 26 December – sailing barge Daphne (United Kingdom) of Rochester was abandoned by her crew and foundered one mile east of St Mary's with her main sail lost. With her jib set she sailed on into Crow Sound and grounded on Tresco. Three days later she was towed to St Mary's as salvage, repaired and returned to Rochester.

=== 1938 ===
- 12 September – Pasteur (France), a fishing vessel from Camaret stranded on Hanjaque. She was a regular visitor to Scillonian and Cornish waters fishing for crayfish. She was refloated on the next high tide.

== World War II ==
=== 1939 ===
- 22 December 1939 – the Clyde Shipping Company's ship Longships (United Kingdom) was wrecked on the Seven Stones reef near the spot where the Torrey Canyon was later lost. The 27 crew was rescued by the St Mary's Lifeboat ( Royal National Lifeboat Institution).

=== 1944 ===
- 20 June 1944 – HMS Warwick (Royal Navy) sunk off the islands by U-413 (Kriegsmarine).
- 1 September 1944 – U-247 (Kriegsmarine), German U-boat
- 18 December 1944 – U-1209 (Kriegsmarine), German U-boat hit the Wolf Rock while schnorkelling. Survivors picked up by Naval vessels.

=== 1945 ===
- 12 January 1945 – merchant ship torpedoed off Scilly.
- 21 January 1945 – U-1199 (Kriegsmarine), German U-boat.
- 24 February 1945 – Oriskany, fruit cargo ship.
- 24 February 1945 – U-1208 (Kriegsmarine), German U-boat.
- 11 March 1945 – U-681 (Kriegsmarine), hit either the Bishop Rock or the Crebinicks. She was badly damaged, tried to make for a neutral port in Ireland but was attacked by an American Liberator plane. The crew scuttled her off Mincarlo or 4 miles (6.4 km) to the north-east of the Isles of Scilly.

== 1946–2000 ==
=== 1949 ===
- 6 October – the 6,300 ton Fantree (or Fantee) (United Kingdom) of the Elder Dempster Line, en route from West Africa to Liverpool via Amsterdam and carrying a cargo of hardwood, palm kernels, palm oil, cocoa, rubber, cotton, coffee beans and copal struck the Seven Stones reef in dense fog. The 53 crew and passengers managed to launch the ship's two lifeboats and many of the mahogany logs were salvaged by local boatman.

=== 1951 ===
- 10 September – the Isles of Scilly packet steamer SS Scillonian (United Kingdom) ran ashore on the Wingletang Rock in fog. She was later refloated and continued in service. The 54 passengers were taken to Hugh Town by the company launch Kittern which went ashore on Rat Island damaging her rudder before finally making it to harbour.

=== 1955 ===
- 21 January – Mando (Panama) a former liberty ship, previously known as SS Stepas Darius, drifted onto Golden Ball bar 0.5 miles west of St Helens when her engines failed. She was en route from Hampton Roads to Rotterdam with 9,000 tons of coal. The captain was initially reluctant to leave his ship and twenty-five crew were saved by the St Mary's lifeboat Cunard. A scheduled monument.
- 22 July 1955 – Panamanian registered steamer Punta (Panama) drove onto the Seven Stones reef and was abandoned by her crew. She filled and sank soon afterwards.

=== 1961 ===
- 9 March – trawler Petit Jean Yves (France) went aground near Cuckolds Carn, Gugh. She was refloated the next day with the help of the St Mary's lifeboat ( Royal National Lifeboat Institution).

=== 1967 ===
- 18 March - oil tanker Torrey Canyon struck Pollard's Rock on Seven Stones reef, 7 mi (11 km) east-northeast (ENE) of Scilly, causing an environmental disaster and the largest oil spill in UK waters to date.

=== 1970 ===
- 25 February – channel trawler Jean Gougy (France) was lost on the Western Rocks. The exact location is unknown, but wreckage and a body were washed up on Tresco. The other thirteen crew were never found.
- 15 April – the MV Poleire (Cyprus) transporting zinc ore to Poland was wrecked on the Little Kettle Rock north of Tresco, and rapidly sank.

=== 1976 ===
- 29 September – the fish factory ship Rarau (Romania) was wrecked on the Seven Stones, where she later sank, although the crew were all rescued.

=== 1977 ===
- 13 February – St Malo trawler Enfant de Bretagne (France) was lost on Pednathise, within the Western Rocks at night. The lifeboat came within hearing distance of the crew, but all drowned in the heavy seas before they could be brought aboard.

=== 1979 ===
- August – Fastnet race, many racing yachts sank in extreme weather

=== 1997 ===
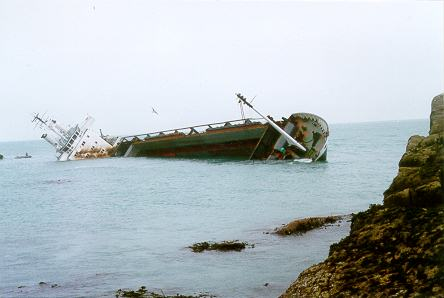
MV Cita

- 26 March – MV Cita (Antigua and Barbuda), German-owned cargo ship wrecked at Newfoundland Point, St Mary's. She was en route to Ireland and on automatic pilot whilst the crew slept. The St Mary's lifeboat took all nine Polish crew ashore.

== See also ==
- List of disasters in Great Britain and Ireland by death toll
- List of shipwrecks of Cornwall
- List of shipwrecks of the Seven Stones Reef
- List of U-boats of Germany
- Lists of shipwrecks
- 1983 British Airways Sikorsky S-61 crash – helicopter crash off the Isles of Scilly
