= Gweal, Isles of Scilly =

Island of the Isles of Scilly, Cornwall, England

Gweal
Gwydhyel
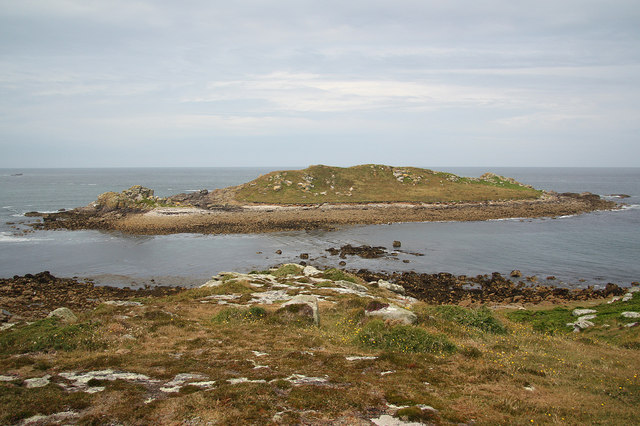
- Gweal viewed from Bryher

- Location within Isles of Scilly

Geography
- Coordinates: 49.9533°N 6.3700°W
- OS grid reference: SV867152
- Archipelago: Isles of Scilly

Administration
- United Kingdom
- Civil parish: Bryher

Demographics
- Population: 52

Gweal (/ɡwiːl/ GWEEL; Cornish: Gwydhyel, lit. 'place of trees') is one of the Isles of Scilly. It is the largest of the seven Norrard Rocks due west of Bryher. The name perhaps refers back to a time before most of the islands' area was inundated. On the top of Gweal Hill are the remnants of an entrance grave and two cairns. The water surrounding the island is about 52 feet deep.
