= Norrard Rocks =

Group of rocks of the Isles of Scilly, Cornwall, England

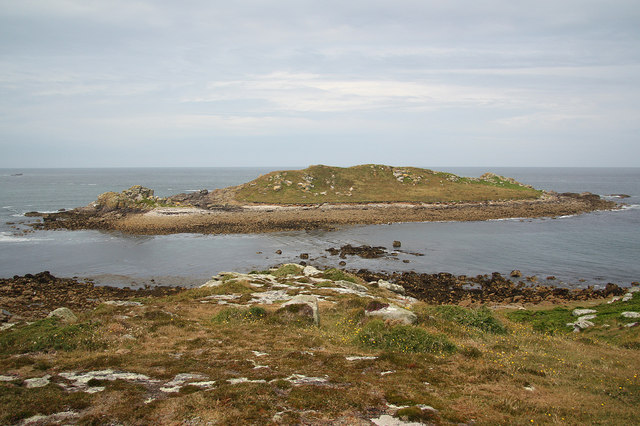
- Gweal viewed from Bryher

- Location within Isles of Scilly

Geography
- Coordinates: 49.9533°N 6.3700°W
- OS grid reference: SV867152
- Archipelago: Isles of Scilly

Administration
- United Kingdom
- Civil parish: Bryher

Demographics
- Population: 0

The Norrard (Northern) Rocks are a group of small uninhabited granite rocks in the north-western part of the Isles of Scilly, to the west of Bryher and Samson. In 1971 they were designated as a Site of Special Scientific Interest (SSSI) for their breeding seabird colonies and they are permanently closed to landings from boat passengers. The vegetation on the islands is limited by the extreme exposure and only six species of flowering plants have been recorded.

== Nature reserve ==
The islands are largely managed as nature reserves by the Isles of Scilly Wildlife Trust, principally for breeding seabirds and grey seals (Halichoerus grypus). The only breeding sites for European storm-petrel in England are on the Isles of Scilly with eleven colonies and an estimated 1475 occupied sites (i.e. breeding pairs). There are only three small breeding colonies on the Norrard Rocks; Mincarlo, Illiswilgig and Castle Bryher with a total of 37 pairs. Other seabirds breeding within the SSSI are fulmar (Fulmarus glacialis), guillemot (Uria aalge), lesser black-backed gull (Larus fuscus) and herring gull (L argentatus). The rove beetle (Omalium allardi) has been recorded on several of the islands.

== Individual islands and rocks ==
The islands and rocks are listed below in decreasing order of area.

=== Gweal ===
(Cornish: Gwydhyel, lit. 'place of trees') (grid reference SV866152) 5.82 hectares (14.4 acres) and 32 metres (105 ft) high.

Gweal is a small rocky island consisting of two hills linked by a boulder beach, just off the west coast of Bryher and is an occasional pupping site for grey seals. Plants recorded are sea beet (Beta vulgaris subsp. maritima), rock sea-spurrey (Spergularia rupicola), common scurvygrass (Cochlearia officinalis), thrift (Armeria maritima) and tree mallow (Lavatera arborea). Twenty-three cattle were salvaged from the Sussex, which was wrecked on Seal Rock, were landed on Gweal in 1885.

=== Scilly Rock ===
(grid reference SV859156) 1.98 hectares (4.9 acres)

Scilly Rock (Cornish: Karrek Syllan) is just over 1 kilometre (0.62 mi) west of Bryher is a large rock, divided by a deep chasm into two parts with a maximum height of 22 metres (72 ft). Each part has a summit named North Cuckoo and South Cuckoo. Landing is difficult and only possible in calm conditions. It is reputedly the island from which the rest of the archipelago gets its name because it was the first part to become separate from the original main island. fr. Puffin (Fratercula arctica) breed and the only plants recorded are rock sea-spurrey and oraches (Atriplex) species.

=== Mincarlo ===
(Cornish: Men Karleyth, lit. 'rayfish stone') (grid reference SV853129) 1.82 hectares (4.5 acres)

Mincarlo is the southernmost of the group 2 kilometres (1.2 mi) west of Samson. Several species nest on the island including the largest breeding colony of cormorant (Phalacrocorax carbo) in the Isles of Scilly as well as puffin, great black-backed gull (Larus marinus), razorbill (Alca torda) and common shag (Gulosus aristotelis). The breeding colony of European storm-petrel (Hydrobates pelagicus) occupied 17 sites during the Seabird 2000 survey. Tree mallow, orache, common scurveygrass, rock sea-spurrey and sea beet have all been recorded. The rocks are a main pupping site for grey seal (Halichoerus grypus). The Arachnologist, W S Bristow visited the Isles of Scilly in 1928, 1929 and 1934 and landed on many of the uninhabited islands. On Mincarlo he recorded the following spiders; Trochosa terricola, Oedothorax fuscus, Lepthyphantes tenuis, Dismodicus bifrons, Xysticus kochi and Halorates reprobus which is associated with the nests of seabirds, especially cormorant and shag.

=== Illiswilgig ===
(Cornish: Enys Weljek, lit. 'grassy island') (grid reference SV858139) 0.90 hectares (2.2 acres)

Several species have bred on Illiswilgig, including a small colony of only three pairs of European storm-petrel, recorded during the Seascape 2000 survey. Plants recorded are tree mallow, thrift, sea beet, rock sea-spurrey, common scurvy grass, orache and English stonecrop (Sedum anglicum). Illiswilgig is a main pupping and haul-out site for grey seal.

=== Maiden Bower ===
(Cornish: Erber an Voren) (grid reference SV850145) 0.66 hectares (1.6 acres)

Only a few gulls breed on Maiden Bower and no plants have been recorded.

=== Castle Bryher ===
(Cornish: Kastel Breyer, lit. 'Bryher's castle') (grid reference SV863140) 0.39 hectares (0.96 acres) and 26 metres (85 ft)

The Seabird 2000 survey recorded 17 occupied sites of European storm-petrel. Puffin and gulls also breed on the island and plants recorded are tree mallow, sea beet, rock sea-spurrey, common scurvygrass and orache.

=== Seal Rock ===
(grid reference SV854141) 0.20 hectares (0.49 acres)

An important breeding and haul out site for grey seal and orache is the only plant recorded.
