= Samson, Isles of Scilly =

Largest uninhabited island of the Isles of Scilly

Samson
Enys Sampson
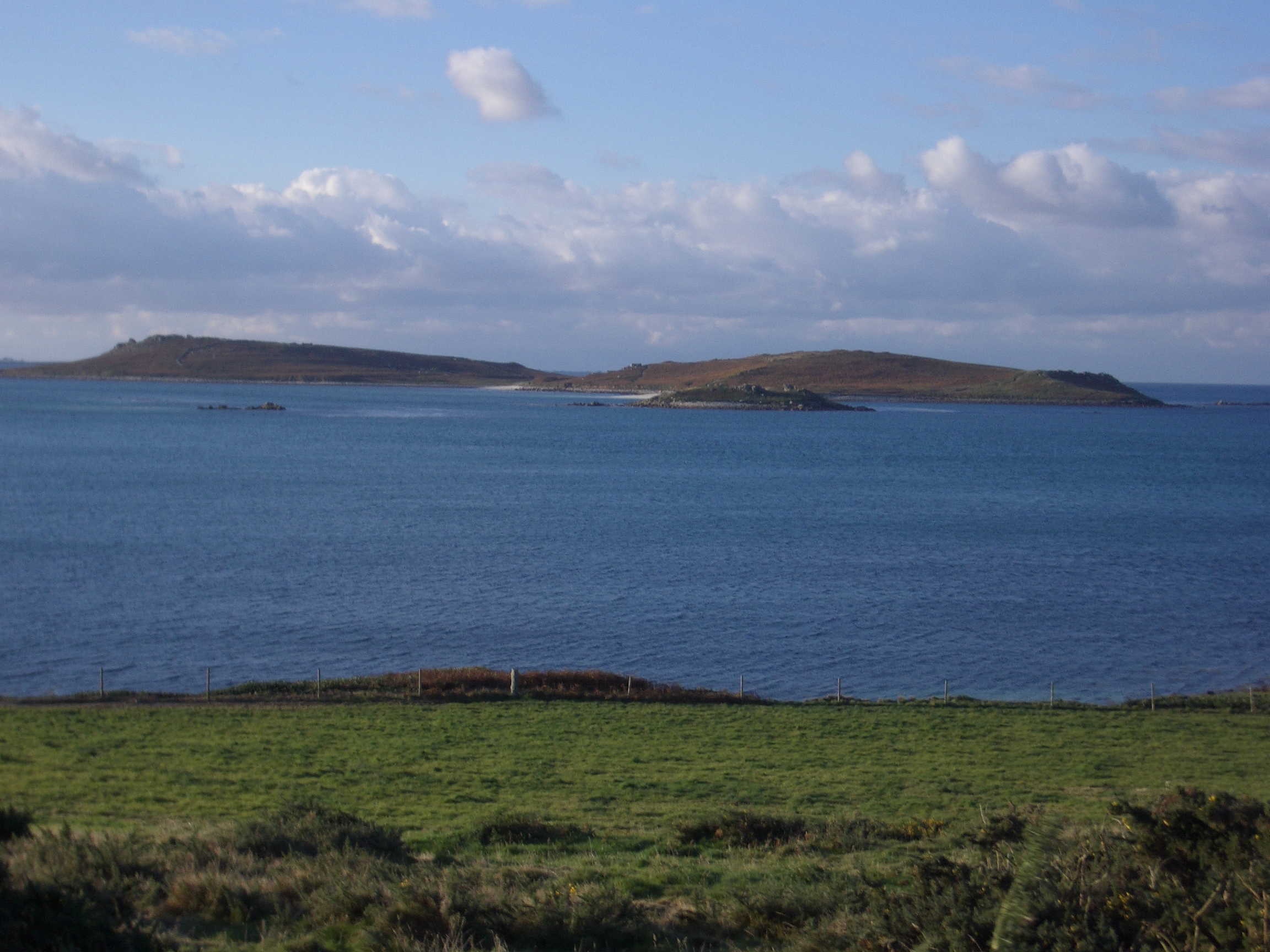
- A view of Samson from Tresco

- Location within Isles of Scilly
- Etymology: Samson of Dol

Geography
- Coordinates: 49.9332°N 6.3529°W
- OS grid reference: SV877127
- Archipelago: Isles of Scilly
- Area: 0.15 sq mi (0.39 km^{2})

Administration
- United Kingdom
- Civil parish: Tresco

Demographics
- Population: 0

Samson (Cornish: (Enys) Sampson) is the largest uninhabited island of the Isles of Scilly, off the southwestern tip of the Cornish peninsula of Great Britain. It is 38 hectares (0.15 sq mi) in size. The island consists of two hills, North Hill and South Hill, which are connected by an isthmus. Samson was named after Samson of Dol.

== History ==
The twin hills of Samson were formerly associated with breasts, in a similar way to the Paps of Jura in Scotland and the Paps of Anu in Ireland. There are large ancient burial grounds both on the North Hill and South Hill.

The first written evidence for the habitation of Samson comes from the Interregnum Survey of 1651–52, when it was recorded that:

"the Sampsons [sic] have been formerly occupied by one or two tenants and divers pieces of the same enclosed & improved as Arable ground. But the houses and inclosures are now fallen downe & ruin'd since the taking of Scilley from the Enemy so that the whole Island of Sampson doth now lay wast & is a Mountainous Rocky & Rugged peece of pasture & Arable ground now used only for some Goates and Conies."

The two most prominent families on Samson, the Woodcocks and the Webbers, allegedly first settled Samson after they came into conflict with two other local families, the Banfields and the Mumfords, who had ordered them to leave their homes and move to Hugh Town. The Woodcocks and Webbers instead opted to move to Samson.

During the 18th century, Samson was used as an unofficial penal colony by the Council of Twelve, the local administration at the time. Local "undesirables" would be banished to the island.

The island was inhabited until 1855, when the Lord Proprietor Augustus Smith removed the remaining population from the island. By this point, the population was found to be suffering from severe deprivation—particularly due to a diet of limpets and potatoes—and consisted of only two families: the Woodcocks and the Webbers. Smith then built a deer park on the island, but the deer escaped from their stone walled enclosure, and some attempted to wade across to Tresco (at low tide). By the 1880s the island was grazed by cattle, sheep and rabbits.

In August 1933 there was a major fire, which was put out by the staff of Major Dorrien-Smith, by digging ditches to stop it spreading.

In recent times the area has become a protected wildlife site. The island is home to many different birds, such as terns and gannets, and many wild flowers. In 1971 the island, along with the nearby islands of Green Island, Puffin Island, Stony Island and White Island, was designated a Site of Special Scientific Interest (SSSI) for its biological characteristics.

== Gallery ==
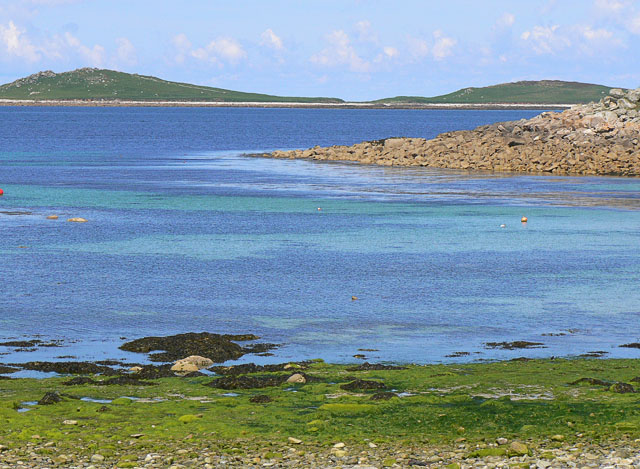
Samson from Porthloo, St Mary's

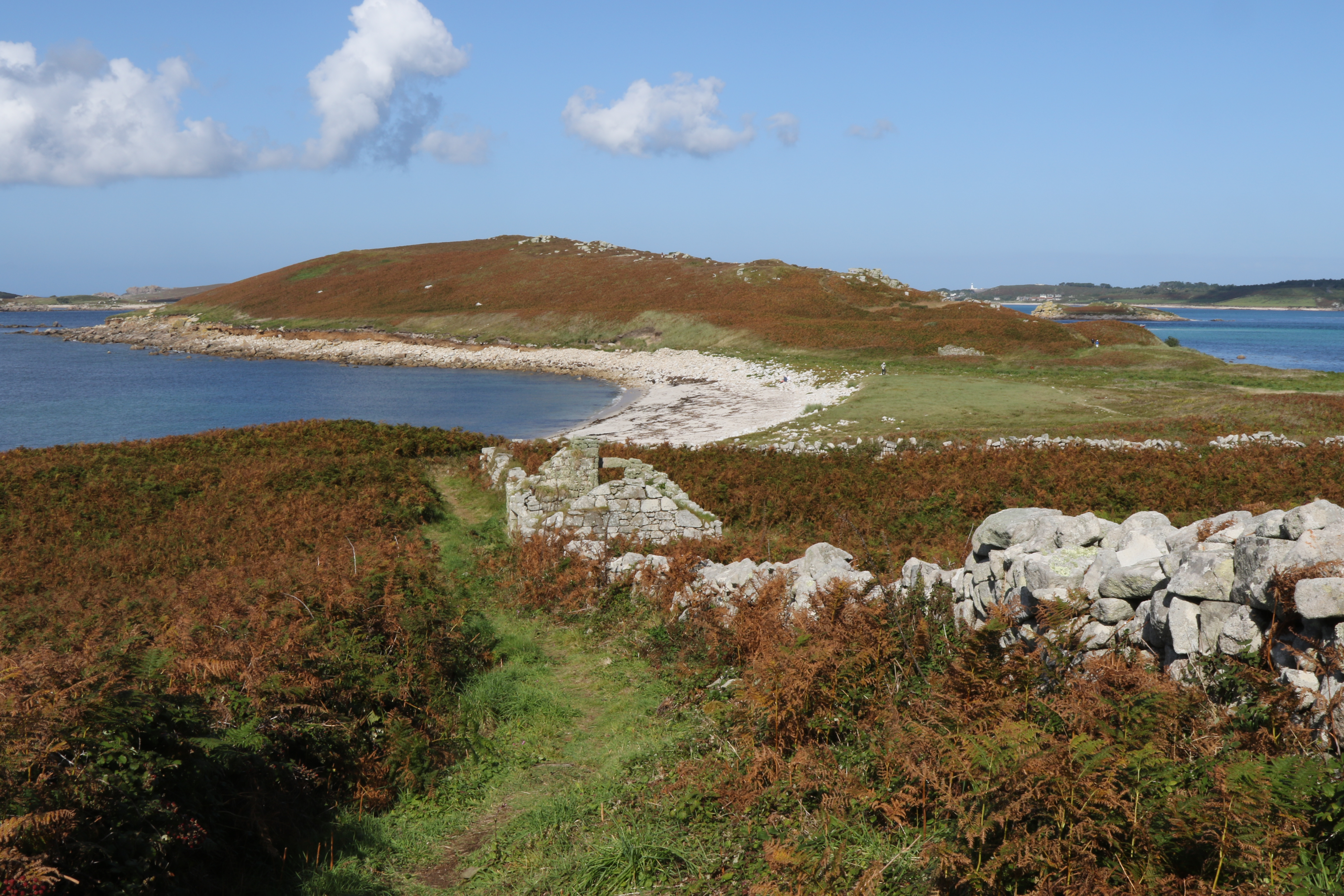
North Hill from South Hill

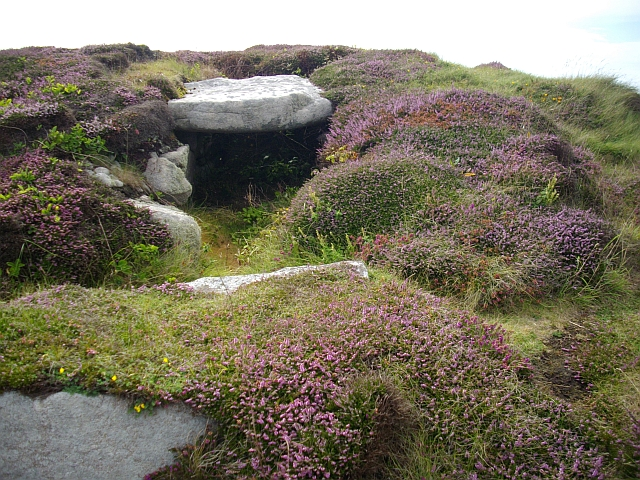
Chambered Cairn on North Hill

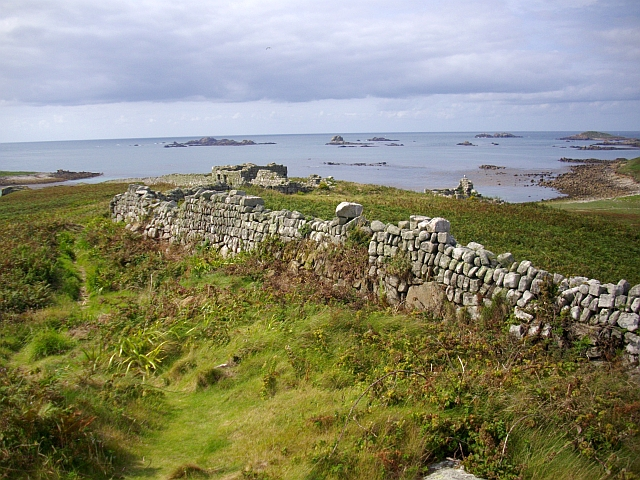
Remains of the deer park wall on South Hill

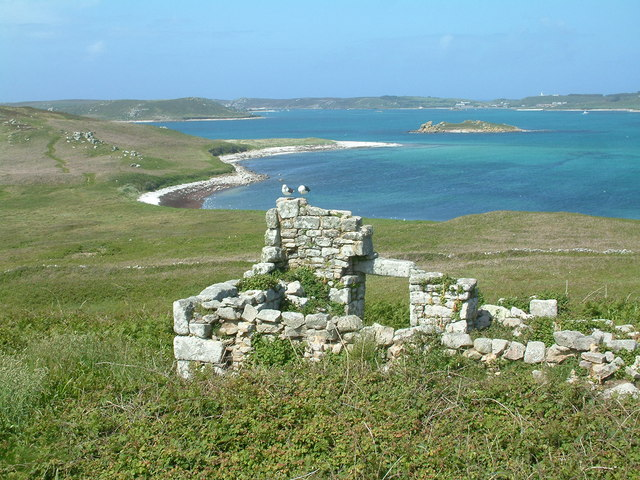
Remains of Cottage on South Hill

=== Population ===
- 1669: one family
- 1715: only three men fit to carry arms
- 1751: two households
- 1794: six households
- 1816: forty people
- 1822: seven households (thirty-four people)
- 1851: three households
- 1855: Augustus Smith removed the remaining inhabitants who consisted of two families.

== Visiting the island ==
Boat trips to Samson are regularly available May through to September. There is no quay, so visitors disembark via a wooden plank. The remains of the old cottages can be explored, and there are also the remains of Smith's deer park and prehistoric entrance graves. There are no amenities or services available, but guided walks are led by local experts.

== Literary associations ==
The island is featured in the children's story Why the Whales Came by Michael Morpurgo. In the book, Samson is under a curse that needs to be lifted. The island also featured in Armorel of Lyonesse by Walter Besant. Webber's Cottage supposedly features in that novel as Armorel's house.

In some medieval versions of the Tristan and Iseult story, Tristan defeats and kills the knight Morholt, uncle of Iseult and brother-in-law of the King of Ireland, at an island called St Samson which is now identified either with the Scilly Isles Samson or with an islet in the Fowey estuary.

Dougie Blaxland's play Leaving Samson (1996) is about the last inhabitants and their removal from the island.

== See also ==
- List of shipwrecks of the Isles of Scilly
- Breast-shaped hill
