= Burnt Island, Isles of Scilly =

Uninhabited island in Isles of Scilly, Cornwall, UK

Burnt Island
- Map showing location of Burnt Island

Geography
- Coordinates: 49°53′44″N 6°21′14″W
- Archipelago: Isles of Scilly
- Area: 0.01 km^{2} (0.0039 sq mi)
- Highest elevation: 1 m (3 ft)

Administration
- United Kingdom

Demographics
- Population: 0 (2020)

Burnt Island is a small, uninhabited island in the Isles of Scilly, Cornwall, United Kingdom. It is covered in thrift and long grasses. and is linked to the island of St Agnes at low tide. It is approximately 150 metres long and 125 metres wide and is oblong in shape.

As of 2014, Burnt Island had a geocache.
