= Council of the Isles of Scilly elections =

Local government elections in Cornwall, England

The Council of the Isles of Scilly is a sui generis authority in the ceremonial county of Cornwall, England, UK. It is elected every four years.

== Council elections ==
- 1973 Council of the Isles of Scilly election
- 1977 Council of the Isles of Scilly election
- 1979 Council of the Isles of Scilly election
- 1981 Council of the Isles of Scilly election
- 1985 Council of the Isles of Scilly election
- 1989 Council of the Isles of Scilly election
- 1993 Council of the Isles of Scilly election
- 1997 Council of the Isles of Scilly election
- 2001 Council of the Isles of Scilly election
- 2005 Council of the Isles of Scilly election
- 2009 Council of the Isles of Scilly election
- 2013 Council of the Isles of Scilly election
- 2017 Council of the Isles of Scilly election (reduction in number of seats from 21 to 16)
- 2021 Council of the Isles of Scilly election
- 2025 Council of the Isles of Scilly election

== By-elections ==
St Mary's by-election 23 May 2019
Party	Candidate	Votes	%	±%
Independent	Tim Dean	281	42.3	
Independent	Jeanette Ware	206	31.0	
Independent	Steve Whomersley	91	13.7	
Independent	Andrew Coombes	86	13.0	
Majority		75	11.3	
Turnout		664		
Independent hold		Swing		

Bryher by-election 24 June 2021
Party	Candidate	Votes	%	±%
Independent	Andrew Frazer	Unopposed		

St Mary's by-election 22 May 2023
Party	Candidate	Votes	%	±%
Independent	John Peacock	301	67.6	
Independent	Tim Jones	144	32.4	
Majority		157	35.3	
Turnout		445		
Independent hold		Swing		
