= 2021 Council of the Isles of Scilly election =

2021 UK local government election

- 6 May 2021
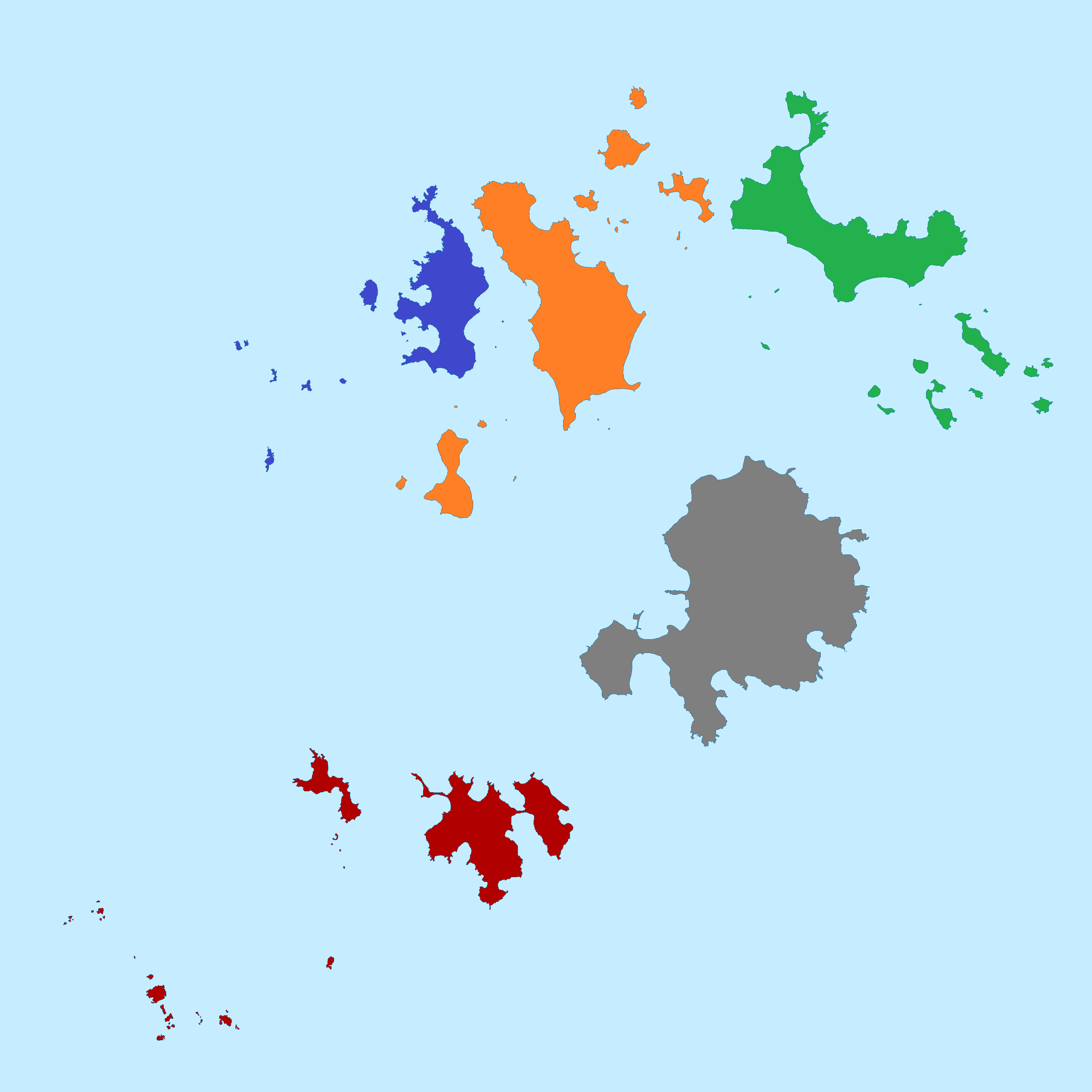
- Map showing the five electoral wards of the Council of the Isles of Scilly. St Mary's (denoted in grey) elects 12 councillors, whereas the other four wards elect one each.
Council control before election
Nonpartisan
Council control after election
Nonpartisan

Elections to the Council of the Isles of Scilly took place on 6 May 2021, alongside other United Kingdom local elections. All 16 seats on the council were up for election. There are 12 councillors for St Mary's and 1 each of the other inhabited isles of Bryher, St Agnes, St Martin's and Tresco.

== Ward results ==
Bryher
Party	Candidate	Votes	%	±%
no nominations	no-one nominated			

St. Agnes
Party	Candidate	Votes	%	±%
no description	Harry Legg	Unopposed		

St. Martin’s
Party	Candidate	Votes	%	±%
no description	Toby Tobin-Dougan	Unopposed		

St. Mary’s
Party	Candidate	Votes	%	±%
no description	Avril Mumford	518		
no description	Robert Francis	492		
no description	Tim Dean	491		
no description	Joel Williams	490		
no description	Anita Bedford	470		
no description	Fran Grottick	458		
no description	Alexander Rodger	419		
no description	Steve Sims	419		
no description	Daniel Marcus	406		
no description	Steve Watt	378		
no description	Andy Guy	371		
no description	Michael Nelhams	367		
no description	Tim Jones	272		

Tresco
Party	Candidate	Votes	%	±%
no description	Robert Dorrien-Smith	Unopposed		

== Changes 2021–2025 ==
=== Further election ===
==== Bryher ====
The previous Bryher councillor, Kathleen Marian Berkeley, also known as Marian, Lady Berkeley, had been elected unopposed in 2017 and retired at the 2021 election. No one was nominated for Bryher on 6 May 2021, so the seat remained vacant and the Returning Officer was required to order a further election. Andrew Crispin Frazer was declared elected for Bryher on 28 May 2021, being the only person nominated.

Bryher further election, 28 May 2021
Party	Candidate	Votes	%	±%
no description	Andrew Crispin Frazer	Unopposed		

== See also ==
- Council of the Isles of Scilly elections
