= 2013 Council of the Isles of Scilly election =

2013 UK local government election

← 2009	2 May 2013	2017 →

All 21 seats to the Council of the Isles of Scilly
Incumbent Council control
Nonpartisan

The 2013 Council of the Isles of Scilly election took place on 2 May 2013 as part of the 2013 local elections in the United Kingdom The council is a sui generis unitary authority within the ceremonial county of Cornwall.

The whole council of 21 members was up for election, with thirteen members elected in the St Mary's electoral division and another eight from the 'Off Islands': being two each from Bryher, St Martin's, St Agnes and Tresco. Since only one candidate stood for each of six 'Off Island' seats they were elected unopposed. The Green Party of England and Wales put up candidates – the first time any party had done so, but both were unsuccessful.

As with other unitary and county elections in England, these local elections in the Isles of Scilly took place for the first time since 1993 without a European or Westminster election on the same day.

== Results summary ==
2013 Isles of Scilly Council election
Party	Seats	Gains	Losses	Net gain/loss	Seats %	Votes %	Votes	+/−
Independent	21	0	0	0	100.0	92.5	6,844	+815
Green	0	0	0	0	0.0	7.5	557	+557

=== By ward ===
St Mary's (13 seats)
Party	Candidate	Votes	%	±%
Independent	Steve M. Sims	658		
Independent	Amanda Jane Martin	628		
Independent	Adrian J. G. Davis	584		
Independent	Gaz O'Neill	552		
Independent	Dudley Mumford	438		
Independent	Fran M. Grottick	426		
Independent	Gordon Bilsborough	423		
Independent	H. Roy Duncan	412		
Independent	Christopher Robin Thomas	388		
Independent	Avril Mumford	360		
Independent	Andrew Guy	358		
Independent	James Francis	347		
Independent	David Pearson	319		
Green	Mark Prebble	297		
Independent	Frederick John Ticehurst	290		
Independent	Sheila Thomas	270		
Green	Louise Graham	260		
Independent	Ralph Harban Banfield	234		

Bryher (2 seats)
Party	Candidate	Votes	%	±%
Independent	K. Marian Bennett	Unopposed		

St Agnes (2 seats)
Party	Candidate	Votes	%	±%
Independent	E. Molly Peacock	Unopposed		
Independent	Richard I. McCarthy	Unopposed		

St Martin's (2 seats)
Party	Candidate	Votes	%	±%
Independent	Colin R. Daly	64		
Independent	Christine S. Savill	63		
Independent	Adam Morton	30		

Tresco (2 seats)
Party	Candidate	Votes	%	±%
Independent	Robert A. Dorrien Smith	Unopposed		
Independent	Michael A. Nelhams	Unopposed		
