= Castle Down =

Plateau on the island of Tresco, England

Castle Down (Tresco)
- Site of Special Scientific Interest
- Location within Isles of Scilly
- Location of Castle Down (Tresco).
- Area of search: Cornwall
- Grid reference: SV885160
- Coordinates: 49.9632°N 6.3444°W
- Interest: Biological and Geological
- Area: 58.1 hectares (0.581 km^{2}; 0.224 sq mi)
- Notification date: 1971

Castle Down is a windswept plateau of maritime heath in the northern part of the island of Tresco, Isles of Scilly. The area has a number of designations including Castle Down (Tresco) Site of Special Scientific Interest (SSSI); is part of the Isles of Scilly Area of Outstanding Natural Beauty; part of the Isles of Scilly Heritage Coast; and part of Plantlife's Isles of Scilly Important Plant Area. The Castle Down Site of Special Scientific Interest is entirely owned by the Duchy of Cornwall. There are a number of Schedule Ancient Monument's ranging in age from Bronze Age cairns (or burial places) to castles built in the 16th and 17th centuries to protect the anchorage of New Grimsby harbour.

== History ==
There is a long history of human habitation with 66 cairns (usually burial sites) dating to the Bronze Age. In addition, within 100 m (328 ft) of the southern boundary of the SSSI, there is an Iron Age field system, associated hut circles and large middens covering 3 ha (7.4 acres). The huts are 5 m (16 ft) to 20 m (66 ft) apart and have diameters ranging from 5 m (16 ft) to 7 m (23 ft) while the middens are up to 11 m (36 ft) long, 10 m (33 ft) wide and 1 m (3.3 ft) high. (grid reference SV 888156) The field system was reused in the 19th century.

The artillery fort on the highest point of the west side of Chapel Down, and now known as King Charles's Castle (grid reference SV882161), was built between 1548 and 1554 in the reign of King Edward VI (1537–53). It was built to guard the northern, deep water approach, to New Grimsby harbour, although it proved to be badly sited to fire on ships below, or to withstand attack from the landward side. For a short time it was the main stronghold in the islands but was replaced by Star Castle on the Garrison, St Mary’s in the 1590s. It was later used as a quarry for the building of the nearby fort known as Cromwell’s Castle. The name, King Charle's, comes from the occupation by Royalist forces – the Parliamentarians took Tresco in 1651 by landing on the other side of the island. In March, 1651 a Dutch fleet arrived off the islands demanding reparations from Royalist privateers. The Dutch threat was countered by Admiral Robert Blake who captured the islands from the Royalists in June. The round tower of Cromwell's Castle (grid reference SV881159), built on the site of a previous blockhouse, was completed the following year to guard the deep water approach to New Grimsby harbour. It was updated around 1740 with a platform built for cannon on the seaward side.

In 1652 the Parliamentary Survey of Scilly reported a row of shallow pits and spoil heaps (grid reference SV884164) following, in part the line of a tin lode. The pits were mostly 1.8 m (6 ft) to 2.4 m (8 ft) deep with some shafts to 7.3 m (24 ft). At the western end was an adit. The mining started in the 1640s and ended by 1652 and was said to be of no value.

Piper’s Hole is a deep cavern reached by scrambling down the north coast cliff. The cave consists of a 20 m (66 ft) long boulder–filled passage leading to an underground pool. With the arrival of tourism in the 19th century a punt was kept there and was used to take tourists to the inner chamber.

== Geography ==
Castle Down is the name given to the northern part of the island of Tresco and is a 35 m (115 ft) plateau of coarse–grained Hercynian granite. The southern edge of the Late Devensian ice sheet probably reached the northern islands of the Isles of Scilly about 18,000 years BP (before present) and there are glacial outwash gravels on the northern part of the downs with erratic pebbles. Raised beach deposits are exposed on the cliffs between Cromwell’s Castle and Gimble Porth. The thin skeletal podzolic soils and extreme exposure to salt laden winds have led to the development of a wind–pruned, lichen–rich, “waved” maritime heath dominated by heather (Calluna vulgaris).

== Wildlife and ecology ==
The northern part of Tresco is designated as the Castle Down (Tresco) Site of Special Scientific Interest for its waved maritime heath, its lichen flora, a breeding colony of Common Tern (Sterna hirundo) and for its geology. The SSSI was first notified in 1971, re–notified in 1986 and covers most of the higher land and cliffs to the north of the inhabited area of the island.

=== Flora ===
Due to the thin, low nutrient podzolic soils and exposure to salt laden winds the vegetation is pruned into a low growing, ankle height, heather carpet. Waved heath is so called because the plants form ‘waves’. On the windward side of the plant there is bare ground and exposed roots with the leaves and flowers concentrated on the sheltered side. The heath is species poor with western gorse (Ulex gallii) and some bell heather (Erica cinerea), which becomes dominate on the southern side of the area. Other species found on the heath are common bird’s-foot trefoil (Lotus corniculatus), English stonecrop (Sedum anglicum), heath bedstraw (Galium saxatile), lousewort (Pedicularis sylvatica) and tormentil (Potentilla erecta). Forty five species of lichen have been recorded including rare Heterodermia communities. The only European sites for H. propagulifera are in the Isles of Scilly.

=== Fauna ===
Peter and Myrtle Ashmore investigated Piper’s Hole in 1993 and amongst the cavernicolous fauna found a springtail new to Britain, Onychiurus argus, a troglophile species known from caves in Belgium, France and Spain.

== See also ==
- Isles of Scilly Wildlife Trust
