= 2009 Council of the Isles of Scilly election =

2009 UK local government election

← 2005	4 June 2009	2013 →

All 21 seats to the Council of the Isles of Scilly
Council control after election
Independent

Elections to the Council of the Isles of Scilly, a sui generis unitary authority in the far southwest of England, were held on 4 June 2009.

The whole council of 21 members was up for election, with thirteen members elected in the St Mary's electoral division and another eight from the 'Off Islands', being two each from Bryher, St Martin's, St Agnes and Tresco. All eight seats for the 'Off Islands' were uncontested.

As with other unitary elections in England, these local elections in the Isles of Scilly took place on the same day as the European elections of 2009. The previous election, in 2005, coincided with the 2005 United Kingdom general election.

== Results summary ==
2009 Isles of Scilly Council election
Party	Seats	Gains	Losses	Net gain/loss	Seats %	Votes %	Votes	+/−
Independent	21	N/A	N/A	N/A	100.0	100.0	6,029	

=== By ward ===
St Mary's (13 seats)
Party	Candidate	Votes	%	±%
Independent	Gordon Bilsborough	570		
Independent	Merryn Smith	526		
Independent	Roy Duncan	510		
Independent	Dudley Mumford	505		
Independent	Brian Mark Lowen	483		
Independent	Christopher Robin Thomas	481		
Independent	Michael Hicks	473		
Independent	Julia Margaret Day	404		
Independent	David Pearson	396		
Independent	Gaz O'Neill	394		
Independent	Amanda Jane Martin	367		
Independent	Ralph Harban Banfield	357		
Independent	Frederick John Ticehurst	335		
Independent	Lorraine Cheney	218		

Bryher (2 seats)
Party	Candidate	Votes	%	±%
Independent	K. Marian Bennett	uncontested		
Independent	Christopher P. Hopkins	uncontested		

St Agnes (2 seats)
Party	Candidate	Votes	%	±%
Independent	E. Molly Peacock	uncontested		
Independent	Richard I. McCarthy	uncontested		

St Martin's (2 seats)
Party	Candidate	Votes	%	±%
Independent	John J. Goddard	uncontested		
Independent	Christine S. Savill	uncontested		

Tresco (2 seats)
Party	Candidate	Votes	%	±%
Independent	Robert A. Dorrien Smith	uncontested		
Independent	Michael A. Nelhams	uncontested		
