= 2017 Council of the Isles of Scilly election =

2017 UK local government election

← 2013	4 May 2017	2021 →

All 16 seats to the Council of the Isles of Scilly
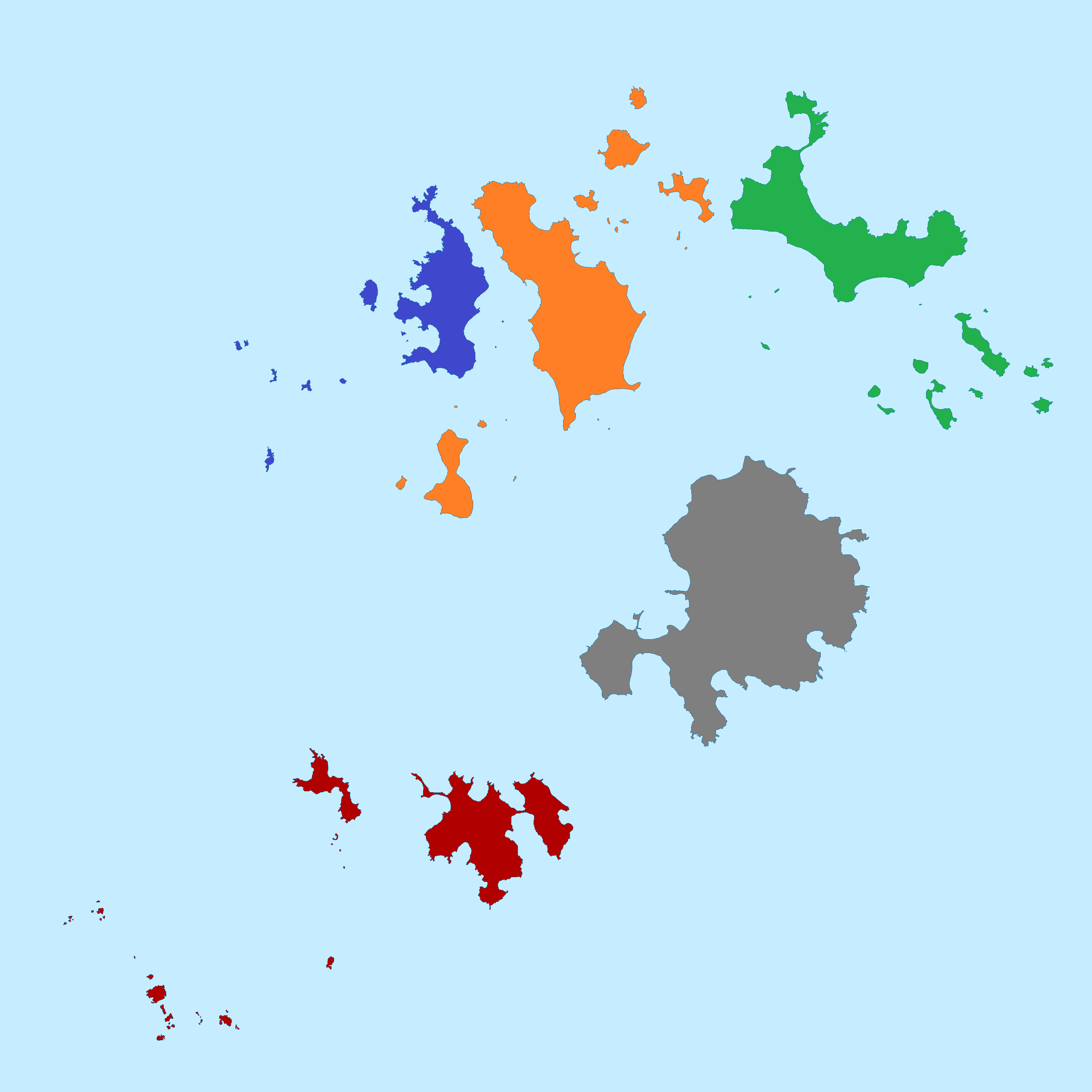
- Map showing the five electoral wards of the Council of the Isles of Scilly. St Mary's (denoted in grey) elects 12 councillors, whereas the four off islands elect one each.
Incumbent Council control
Nonpartisan

The 2017 Council of the Isles of Scilly election took place on 4 May 2017 as part of the 2017 local elections in the United Kingdom. The council is a sui generis unitary authority within the ceremonial county of Cornwall.

The whole council of 16 members was up for election, with twelve members elected in the St Mary's electoral division and another four from the 'Off Islands'; one each from Bryher, St Martin's, St Agnes and Tresco. The total number of councillors was being reduced from 21, with each island electing one councillor fewer than previously.

== Candidates ==
22 candidates stood for election, with all candidates standing independently of any political party. Since only one candidate stood for each off island they were elected unopposed. 18 candidates stood for the remaining 12 seats on St Mary's.

St Mary's (12 seats)
Party	Candidate	Votes	%	±%
Independent	Robert D Francis	576		
Independent	Frances M Grottick	538		
Independent	Adrian J G Davis	520		
Independent	Joel Williams	514		
Independent	Avril W Mumford	493		
Independent	Edward W Moulson	481		
Independent	Stephen J Watt	436		
Independent	A Euan Rodger	430		
Independent	Daniel M Marcus	428		
Independent	Andrew S Guy	420		
Independent	Michael A Nelhams	408		
Independent	Stephen M Sims	376		
Independent	Amanda J Martin	321		
Independent	J Nicola Guthrie	319		
Independent	Bethany J Hilton	311		
Independent	Fraser V Hicks	297		
Independent	Andrew J Combes	250		
Independent	Thomas Mitchell	25		

Bryher
Party	Candidate	Votes	%	±%
Independent	Kathleen Marian Berkeley	Unopposed		

St Agnes
Party	Candidate	Votes	%	±%
Independent	Harry F Legg	Unopposed		

St Martin's
Party	Candidate	Votes	%	±%
Independent	Jonathan Smith	Unopposed		

Tresco
Party	Candidate	Votes	%	±%
Independent	Robert A Dorrien Smith	Unopposed		
