= Tom Dorrien-Smith =

British politician and leaseholder of Tresco (1913–1973)

Lt. Cdr. Tom Dorrien-Smith JP
- Born: Thomas Mervyn Smith-Dorrien-Smith; 12 May 1913
- Died: 5 December 1973 (aged 60); Tresco, Isles of Scilly
- Education: Royal Naval College, Dartmouth
- Occupation: Politician
- Spouses: Tamara Imeretinsky (married 1945, divorced 1967); Peggy Worthington (married 1967)
- Children: 5 (including Robert Dorrien-Smith)
- Parents: Arthur Dorrien-Smith (father); Eleanor Bowlby (mother)
- Relatives: Thomas Smith-Dorrien (grandfather); Augustus Smith (great-granduncle)

Lieutenant Commander Thomas Mervyn Smith-Dorrien-Smith JP (12 May 1913 – 5 December 1973) was a British politician who was the leaseholder of the island of Tresco from 1955 until 1973. He served as Chairman of the Council of the Isles of Scilly from 1972 until his death in 1973.

== Biography ==
Tom Dorrien-Smith was born on 12 May 1913 to Arthur Dorrien-Smith and Eleanor Bowlby. He had three brothers and three sisters. All three of his brothers were killed while serving in World War Two. He was educated at the Royal Naval College at Dartmouth. He served in the Royal Navy from 1927 to 1946. While serving in World War Two, he was involved in the sinking of the Bismark. In 1944, he was made a Lieutenant Commander. He married Princess Tamara Imeretinsky in 1945. He had five children with her, including their eldest son Robert Dorrien-Smith.In September 1947, Tom Dorrien-Smith became a councillor, representing Tresco. In 1967 Dorrien-Smith and his wife Tamara divorced, and he married Peggy Worthington the same year. Also in that year, he was visited at the Tresco Abbey Gardens by members of the Royal Family, including the Queen, Prince Philip, Prince Charles and Princess Anne. The Queen Mother also visited him at the gardens in 1962 and 1969. In April 1970, Dorrien-Smith was made an alderman and vice-chairman of the Council of the Isles of Scilly, and was made chairman in April 1972. Unlike his father, who inherited the title of chairman, Tom Dorrien-Smith was democratically elected as chair. In 1973, he returned to the Isles of Scilly from King Edward VII Hospital in London, ill from cancer, and died shortly after on 5 December 1973. He was succeeded as leaseholder of Tresco by his eldest son Robert Dorrien-Smith.
