= 2025 Council of the Isles of Scilly election =

2025 UK local government election

- 1 May 2025

All 16 seats to the Council of the Isles of Scilly
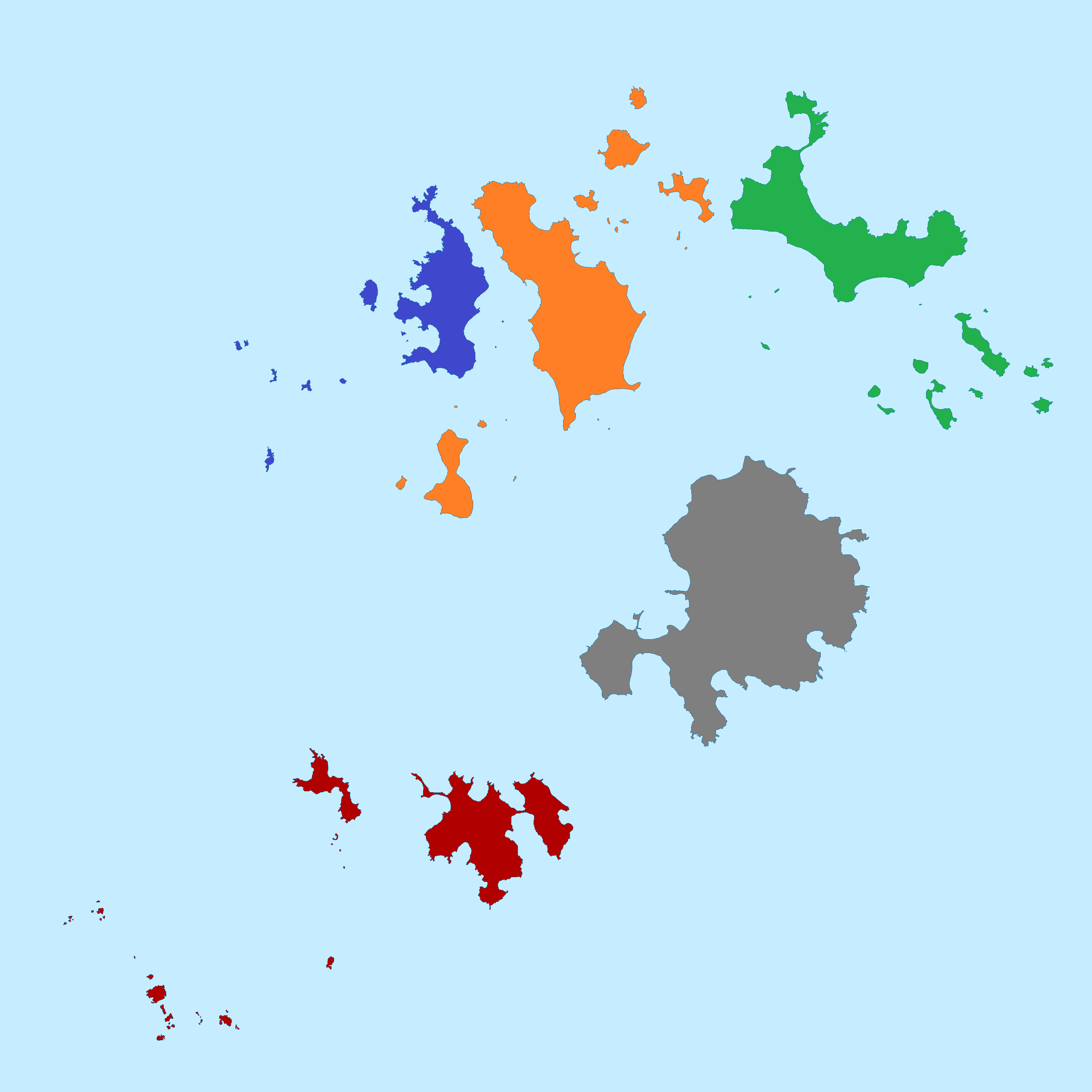
- Map showing the five electoral wards of the Council of the Isles of Scilly. St Mary's (denoted in grey) elects 12 councillors, whereas four of the other islands elect one each.
Council control before election
Nonpartisan
Council control after election
Nonpartisan

Elections to the Council of the Isles of Scilly took place on 1 May 2025, alongside other United Kingdom local elections. All 16 seats on the council — 12 councillors for St Mary's and 1 each of the other inhabited isles of Bryher, St Agnes, St Martin's and Tresco—were up for election.

Only one seat was contested, on St Martin's, with all other seats filled by unopposed nominations.

== Ward results ==
St Agnes
Party	Candidate	Votes	%	±%
No description	Harry Francis Legg	Unopposed		

Bryher
Party	Candidate	Votes	%	±%
No description	Alex Sandford	Unopposed		

St Martin’s
Party	Candidate	Votes	%	±%
Independent	Geoff White	66	76.7	N/A
No description	Toby Tobin-Dougan	20	23.3	N/A
Majority		46	53.5	N/A
Rejected ballots		1	1.1	
Turnout		86	72.5	
Registered electors		120		
Independent gain from Independent				

St Mary's (12 seats)
Party	Candidate	Votes	%	±%
No description	Lynn Blackwell	Unopposed		
Independent	Tim Dean	Unopposed		
Independent	Robert Francis	Unopposed		
Independent	Fran Grottick	Unopposed		
Independent	Andy Guy	Unopposed		
Independent	Daniel Michael Marcus	Unopposed		
Independent	Avril Washington Mumford	Unopposed		
No description	Stuart Anthony Nixon	Unopposed		
No description	John Peacock	Unopposed		
Independent	Euan Rodger	Unopposed		
No description	Steve Sims	Unopposed		
Independent	Joel Williams	Unopposed		

Tresco
Party	Candidate	Votes	%	±%
No description	Robert Arthur Dorrien-Smith	Unopposed		

== See also ==
- Council of the Isles of Scilly elections
