= Robert Dorrien-Smith =

British businessman and leaseholder of Tresco

- Born: Robert Arthur Smith-Dorrien-Smith; 1951 (age 74–75)
- Education: Eton College
- Occupations: Businessman, politician
- Spouses: Lady Emma Windsor Clive (divorced); Lucy Morgan Smith
- Children: 5
- Parents: Tom Dorrien-Smith (father); Tamara Imeretinsky (mother)

Robert Arthur Smith-Dorrien-Smith (born 1951) is a British businessman and politician. He is also the current leaseholder of Tresco, an island of the Isles of Scilly.

== Biography ==
Robert Dorrien-Smith was born in 1951 to Thomas Mervyn Smith-Dorrien-Smith and Princess Tamara Imeretinsky. He was raised at Tresco Abbey. At age 8, he attended Sunningdale School, a prep school in Berkshire. He attended an agricultural college before later being educated at Eton. After the death of his father Thomas Dorrien-Smith in 1973, Robert Dorrien-Smith inherited the lease to Tresco at the age of 22. Up until 2004, Dorrien-Smith and his wife Lucy had made numerous improvements to Tresco, such as the construction of a new terminal building at Tresco Heliport, as well as many additions to the Tresco Abbey Gardens including a new entrance building, a shell-decorated gazebo and 2 sculptures by David Wynne. He also acquired a hotel on the neighbouring island of Bryher, then the second Tresco Estate owned hotel on the Islands, in 1999. He introduced the concept of timeshares to Tresco in 1978.

Dorrien-Smith was one of the backers of a new helicopter service to the islands and the new Penzance Heliport. He is friends with King Charles III, who, through the Duchy of Cornwall, was the landlord and ultimate owner of Tresco, and often visits the Islands. Dorrien-Smith has been a councillor, representing the ward of Tresco, for the Council of the Isles of Scilly from 1976 to 1979 and since 2002.

Dorrien-Smith's first marriage was to Lady Emma Windsor Clive; together they had 3 children. His second marriage was to Lucy Morgan Smith, and they had 2 children.

== Electoral record ==
=== 2009 Council of the Isles of Scilly elections ===
Tresco (2 seats)
Party	Candidate	Votes	%	±%
Independent	Robert Dorrien-Smith	Unopposed		
Independent	Michael A. Nelhams	Unopposed		

=== 2013 Council of the Isles of Scilly elections ===
Tresco (2 seats)
Party	Candidate	Votes	%	±%
Independent	Robert Dorrien-Smith	Unopposed		
Independent	Michael A. Nelhams	Unopposed		

=== 2017 Council of the Isles of Scilly elections ===
Tresco
Party	Candidate	Votes	%	±%
Independent	Robert Dorrien-Smith	Unopposed		

=== 2021 Council of the Isles of Scilly elections ===
Tresco
Party	Candidate	Votes	%	±%
no description	Robert Dorrien-Smith	Unopposed		

=== 2025 Council of the Isles of Scilly elections ===
Tresco
Party	Candidate	Votes	%	±%
no description	Robert Dorrien-Smith	Unopposed		
