= Tresco Boat Services =

Passenger boat services in the Isles of Scilly

- Firethorn at Church Quay, Bryher
- Industry: Passenger transport
- Predecessor: Bryher Boat Services
- Founded: 2014
- Founder: Tresco Estate
- Headquarters: Tresco, Isles of Scilly, England

Tresco Boat Services provides passenger boat services in the Isles of Scilly for those resident or staying on the islands of Tresco and Bryher.

== History ==
The business was formed in 2014 when Tresco Estate took over the operation of Bryher Boat Services which had previously been run by David and Kathleen Stedeford, and James Stedeford of Bryher.

The company inherited the vessels Firethorn, Cyclone and Hurricane from Bryher Boat Services, and in 2024 Cyclone and Hurricane were replaced with larger rib boats Thunder and Lightening.

== List of vessels ==
Thunder of 2024

- Firethorn 1991 (originally Firethorn of Bryher built by Chapman and Hewitt, Wadebridge, Cornwall at a cost of £180,000 (equivalent to £414,000 in 2025)). A news item of the construction and arrival of Firethorn is available Video on YouTube MMSI 235003726
- Thunder 2024 (built by Mainstay Marine Solutions Ltd, Pembroke Dock. A Ribworker 2.0) MMSI 232051504
- Lightning 2024 (built by Mainstay Marine Solutions Ltd, Pembroke Dock. A Ribworker 2.0) MMSI 232051506

== Former vessels ==
This list includes those previously owned by Bryher Boat Services.

New Britannic formerly Commodore

Faldore II of 1981

- Commodore 1976 - 1991 (originally New Britannic 1930, one of the Little Ships of Dunkirk). She is registered as a National Historic Ship with registration number 543 and has returned to her original name.
- Faldore II 1981
- Cyclone 2003 (built by Ocean Dynamics. A Ribworker D 1100) MMSI 235009381
- Hurricane 2003 (built by Ocean Dynamics. A Ribworker D 1100) MMSI 235014877
- Tornado (large Rib)
