= Robert Francis (politician) =

British politician and businessman

Chairman of the Council of the Isles of Scilly
- In office 8 May 2018 – 21 May 2026
- Preceded by: Ted Moulson
- Succeeded by: Joel Williams

Member of the Council of the Isles of Scilly
- Incumbent
- Assumed office 2017
- Ward: St Mary's

Personal details
- Party: Independent
- Occupation: Hotelier, politician

Robert Francis is a British politician and businessman who served as Chairman of the Council of the Isles of Scilly from 2018 to 2026. He, along with his wife Teresa, have owned the Star Castle hotel since 2003 and the Holy Vale vineyard since 2009. Previous to this, he built a hotel on St Martin's which opened in 1989, and ran the Polurrian Hotel in Mullion, on the Lizard Peninsula.

== Electoral record ==
=== 2017 Council of the Isles of Scilly election ===
St Mary's (12 seats)
Party	Candidate	Votes	%	±%
Independent	Robert D Francis	576		
Independent	Frances M Grottick	538		
Independent	Adrian J G Davis	520		
Independent	Joel Williams	514		
Independent	Avril W Mumford	493		
Independent	Edward W Moulson	481		
Independent	Stephen J Watt	436		
Independent	A Euan Rodger	430		
Independent	Daniel M Marcus	428		
Independent	Andrew S Guy	420		
Independent	Michael A Nelhams	408		
Independent	Stephen M Sims	376		
Independent	Amanda J Martin	321		
Independent	J Nicola Guthrie	319		
Independent	Bethany J Hilton	311		
Independent	Fraser V Hicks	297		
Independent	Andrew J Combes	250		
Independent	Thomas Mitchell	25		

=== 2021 Council of the Isles of Scilly election ===
St. Mary’s
Party	Candidate	Votes	%	±%
no description	Avril Mumford	518		
no description	Robert Francis	492		
Independent	Tim Dean	491		
no description	Joel Williams	490		
no description	Anita Bedford	470		
Independent	Fran Grottick	458		
no description	Alexander Rodger	419		
no description	Steve Sims	419		
no description	Daniel Marcus	406		
Independent	Steve Watt	378		
Independent	Andy Guy	371		
no description	Michael Nelhams	367		
Independent	Tim Jones	272		
Turnout				

=== 2025 Council of the Isles of Scilly election ===
St Mary's (12 seats)
Party	Candidate	Votes	%	±%
No description	Lynn Blackwell	Unopposed		
Independent	Tim Dean	Unopposed		
Independent	Robert Francis	Unopposed		
Independent	Fran Grottick	Unopposed		
Independent	Andy Guy	Unopposed		
Independent	Daniel Michael Marcus	Unopposed		
Independent	Avril Washington Mumford	Unopposed		
No description	Stuart Anthony Nixon	Unopposed		
No description	John Peacock	Unopposed		
Independent	Euan Rodger	Unopposed		
No description	Steve Sims	Unopposed		
Independent	Joel Williams	Unopposed		
