= Tamara Imeretinsky =

Georgian royal princess (born 1926)

Princess Tamar Mikheilis Asuli Bagration-Imeretinsky (Georgian: თამარ მიხეილის ასული ბაგრატიონ-იმერეტინსკი) is a Georgian royal princess (batonishvili) of the royal Bagrationi dynasty of Imereti.

She married, firstly, Thomas Mervyn Smith-Dorrien-Smith, son of Arthur Dorrien-Smith on 21 July 1945 at London, England. She and Thomas were divorced in 1967.

She married, secondly, Charles Strachey, 4th Baron O'Hagan, on 13 July 1967 at London, England. They were divorced in 1984.

Princess Tamar with Thomas Mervyn Smith-Dorrien-Smith had 5 children:

- Teona Judith Smith-Dorrien-Smith (b. 29 Nov. 1946)
- Alexandra Smith-Dorrien-Smith (b. 11 Oct. 1948 – d. 5 Apr. 2007)
- Robert Arthur Smith-Dorrien-Smith (b. 15 May 1951)
- Charlotte Sophia Smith-Dorrien-Smith (b. 22 Apr 1954 – d. 3 Jan 1997)
- James Smith-Dorrien-Smith (b. 20 Jul 1957)

Princess Tamar with Charles Strachey, 4th Baron O'Hagan, had 1 child:

- Hon. Nino Natalia O'Hagan Strachey (b. 16 Jul 1968)
