= Sam Llewellyn =

British author (born 1948)

- Born: 1948 (age 77–78); Tresco, Isles of Scilly
- Occupation: Author
- Writing career
- Genres: Novels, Children's literature, Sailing thrillers
- Website: www.samllewellyn.com

Sam Llewellyn (born 1948) is a British author of literature for children and adults.

== Biography ==
Sam Llewellyn was born on Tresco, Isles of Scilly, where his ancestors lived for many years. He grew up in Norfolk. He attended Eton College and later St Catherine's College, Oxford. Llewellyn went on to live in Toronto, Ontario, Canada, and Ireland, before settling in Herefordshire, England, where he still lives. Llewellyn has a deep love for the sea, and this has influenced much of his writing. He goes sailing regularly.

He was originally an editor and fine art dealer before becoming an author. He has become a prolific writer, and has written for both children and adults. He has also worked as a journalist with newspapers and magazines from both America and Britain.

He is a columnist for Practical Boat Owner, Hortus, Broad Sheep and the RYA website, and the owner and editor of The Marine Quarterly, a journal of the sea - 'The thinking sailor's sea journal' according to Tom Cunliffe.

== Personal life ==
Llewellyn is married to Canadian children's author Karen Wallace. They have two sons.

== Works ==
=== Novels for adults ===
- Gurney's Release (1979)
- Gurney's Revenge (1981) – a.k.a. Sea Devil
- Gurney's Reward (1981)
- Hell Bay, Arch, 1984, ISBN 0-947618-00-7
- Great Circle, Weidenfeld & Nicolson, 1987, ISBN 0-297-79167-2 (a.k.a. Sea Story)
- The Shadow in the Sands, 1998, ISBN 0-7472-6005-2 (a "sequel" to the Erskine Childers novel "The Riddle of the Sands")
- The Sea Garden, 1999, ISBN 0-7472-6006-0
- The Iron Hotel, 2000, ISBN 0-7551-0009-3
- The Malpas Legacy, 2001, ISBN 0-7472-7276-X

==== Navarone series ====
(written as authorised sequels to the Alistair MacLean novels "The Guns of Navarone" and "Force 10 from Navarone"

- Storm Force from Navarone, HarperCollins, 1996
- Thunderbolt from Navarone, HarperCollins, 1998
- The four Navarone novels are published as an omnibus volume "The Complete Navarone", HarperCollins, 2008 (HB) & 2011 (PB) ISBN 978 000 7416950.

==== Sailing thrillers ====
(set in and around the fishing village of Pulteney)

- Dead Reckoning, 1987
- Blood Orange, 1988
- Death Roll, 1989
- Deadeye, 1990
- Blood Knot, 1991
- Riptide, 1992
- Clawhammer, 1993
- Maelstrom, 1994
- Black Fish, 2010
- Singlehand, 2019

==== Non fiction ====
- The Worst Journey in the Midlands, 1983
- Emperor Smith - the man who built Scilly
- The Minimum Boat, Adlard Coles Nautical, 2010
- Digging with the Duchess, 2018
- Digging Deeper with the Duchess, 2021

=== For children ===
==== Monsters of Lyonesse series ====
- Lyonesse:The Well Between The Worlds, Scholastic 2009
- Lyonesse:Dark Solstice, Scholastic 2010

==== Darlings series ====
- Little Darlings, Puffin, 2004, ISBN 0-14-131691-8
- Bad, Bad Darlings, Puffin Books, 2005, ISBN 0-14-131701-9
- Desperado Darlings, Puffin Books, 2006, ISBN 0-14-131981-X

==== Death Eric ====
- The Return of Death Eric, Puffin, 2005, ISBN 0-14-131853-8
- The Haunting of Death Eric, Puffin Books, 2006, ISBN 0-14-131984-4

==== Others ====
- The Magic Boathouse, Walker Books Ltd, 1994, ISBN 0-7445-2473-3
- The Rope School, Walker Books Ltd, 1995, ISBN 0-7445-3663-4
- Pig in the Middle, Walker Books Ltd, 1996, ISBN 0-7445-5217-6
- The Polecat Cafe, Walker Books Ltd, 1998, ISBN 0-7445-4157-3
- Nelson - the sailor who dared to win, Short Books, 2004, ISBN 1-904095-65-8
- Pegleg, ISBN 0-7551-0011-5
- Wonderdog

== See also ==
- Tresco
