= Piper's Hole =

Sea Cave on the Isles of Scilly

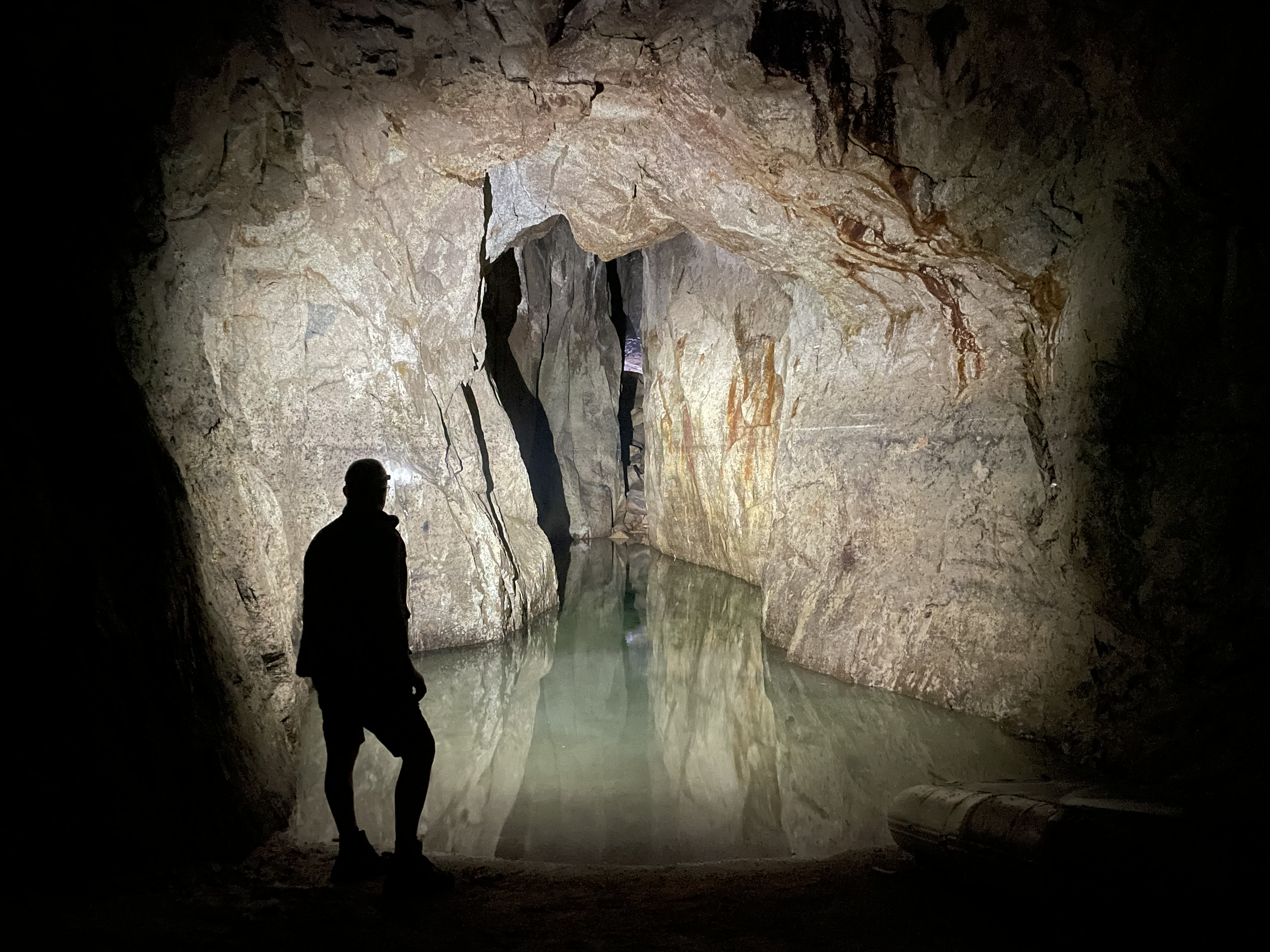
- Inside Piper's Hole

- Location within Isles of Scilly
- OS grid: SV 8864 1655
- Coordinates: 49°58′04″N 6°20′36″W
- Entrances: 1

Piper's Hole is a sea cave located on Tresco, an island of the Isles of Scilly. The name Piper's Hole can also refer to another, more minor, sea cave in the Isles of Scilly, located on Penninis Head, St Mary's.

== Etymology ==
Piper's Hole is thought to have been named after the clay pipes that smokers would have used, due to the clay seams on the cave walls. Alternatively, others have theorised that the name comes from legends that postulated that the cave was once a fairy cave, and that said fairies would play pipes which could be heard from the cave.

== History ==
Piper's Hole is thought to have once been a smugglers hideout. In the 17th century, the cave was mined out for tin. With the rise of tourism to the islands in the 19th and early 20th centuries, a punt was kept in the subterranean pool to ferry people across to the small beach on the other side for a fee. Candles would be placed and lit in the cave in order to illuminate it for visitors. Ethel Smyth, a suffragette and composer, once visited the cave, and featured it in her 1903 opera The Wreckers.

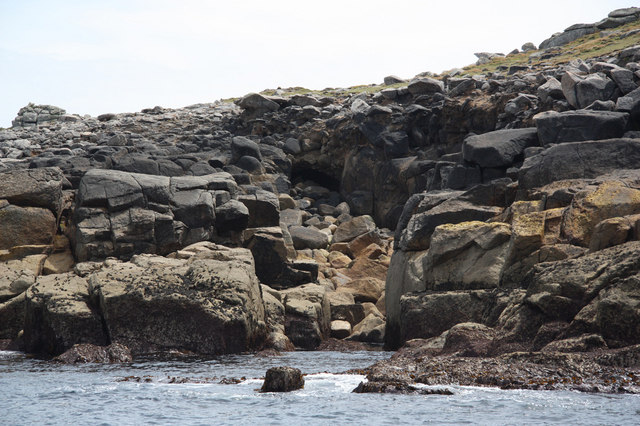
The entrance of Piper's Hole

== Layout ==
The cave entrance is located on the far northeast of Tresco. Access to the cave is through this entrance, which is relatively small and fronted by boulders. The cave opens up from this entrance to a small underground lake. Across the lake there is a small gravel beach, and a 30-metre-long (98 ft) corridor.

== Legend ==
According to legend, Piper's Hole, Tresco, is connected via an underground passage to Piper's Hole, St Mary's. The legend states that people who attempted to traverse the passage were never seen again, and dogs who went through would emerge without much of their fur. Another legend states that Piper's Hole, Tresco, was home to a mermaid.

== Fauna ==
An investigation of Piper’s Hole by Peter and Myrtle Ashmore in 1993 found a springtail new to Britain, Onychiurus argus, a troglophile species known from caves in Belgium, France and Spain.

== Gallery ==
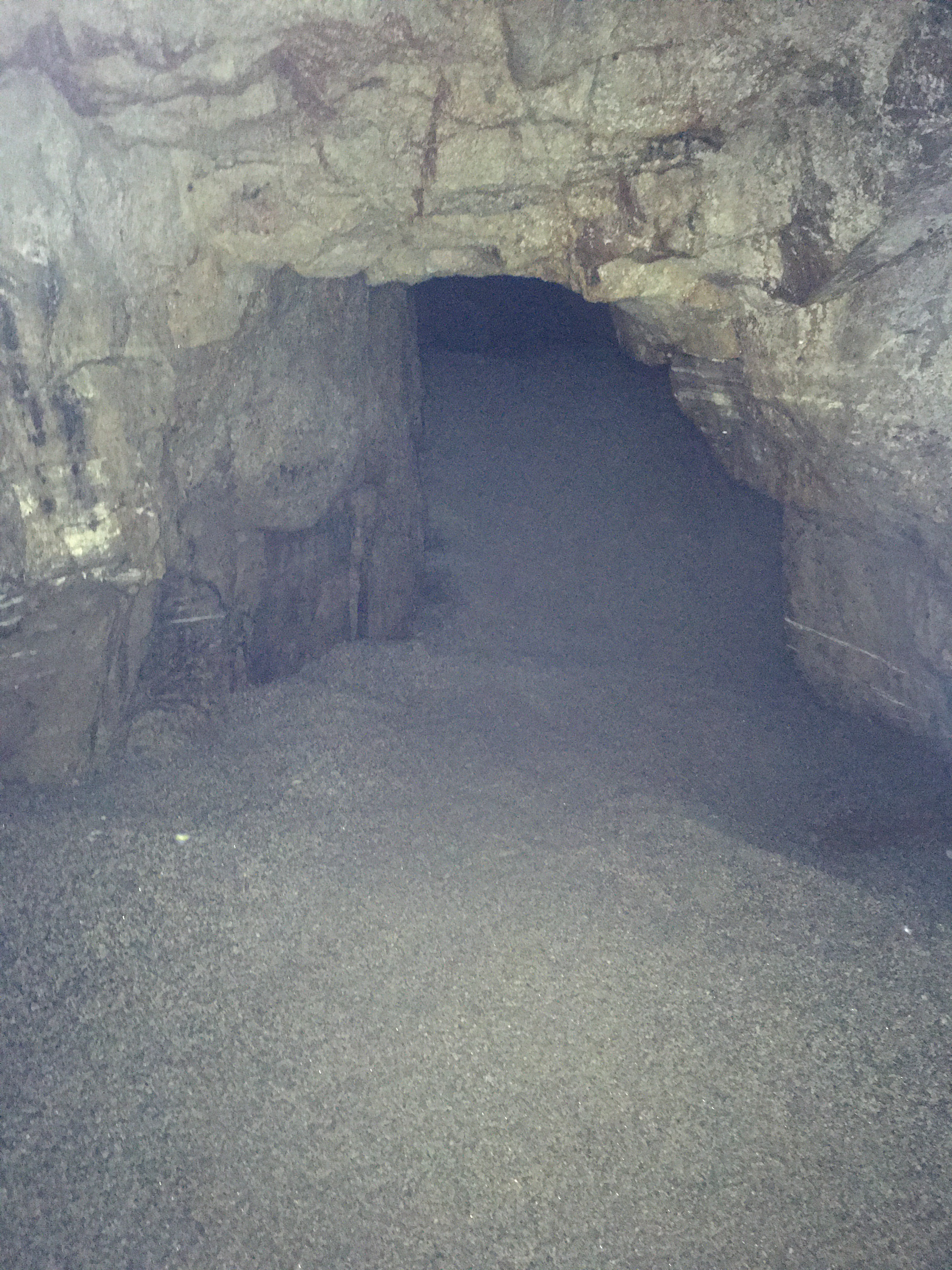
Interior of Piper's Hole, Tresco

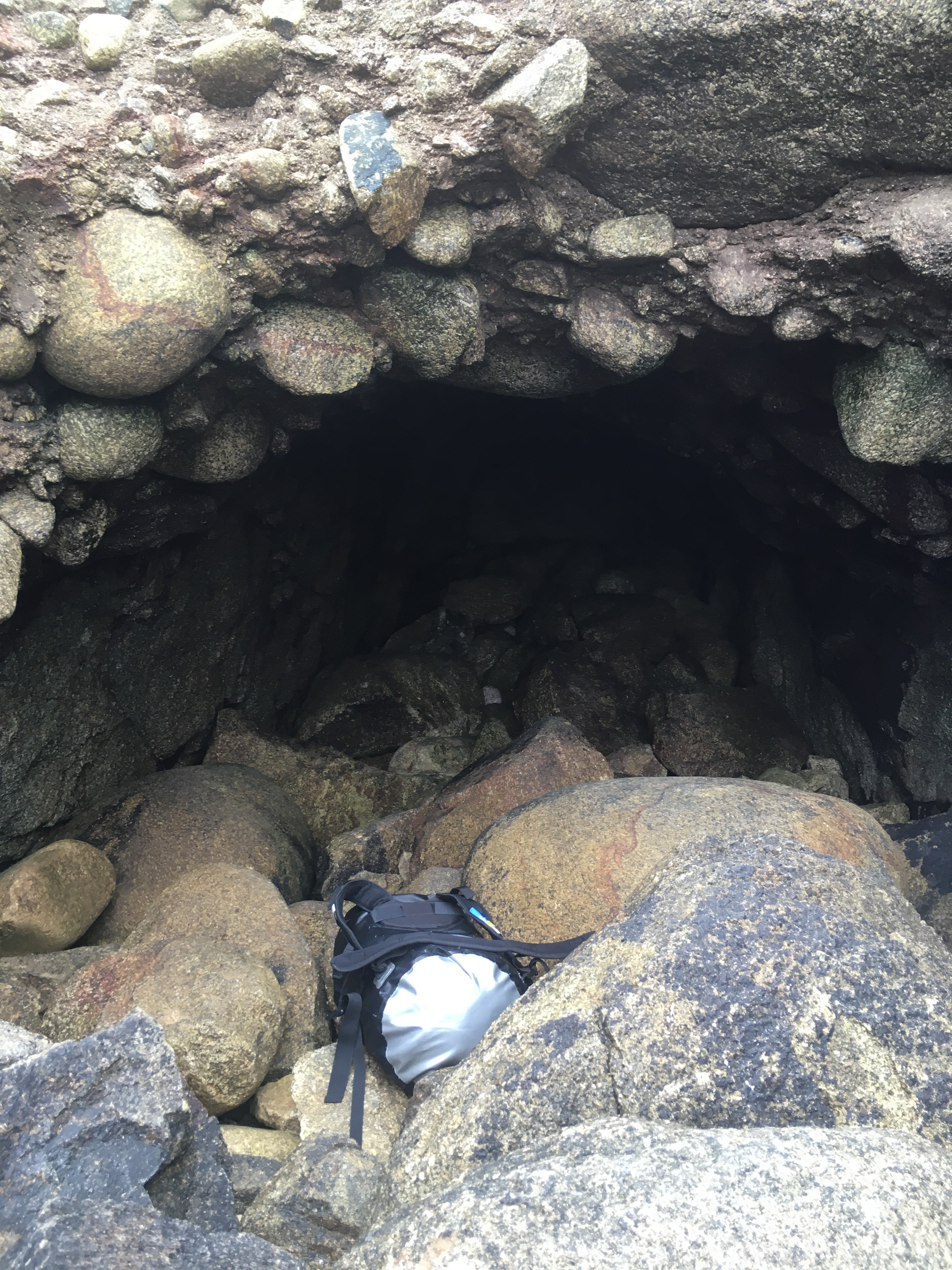
Entrance of Piper's Hole, Tresco

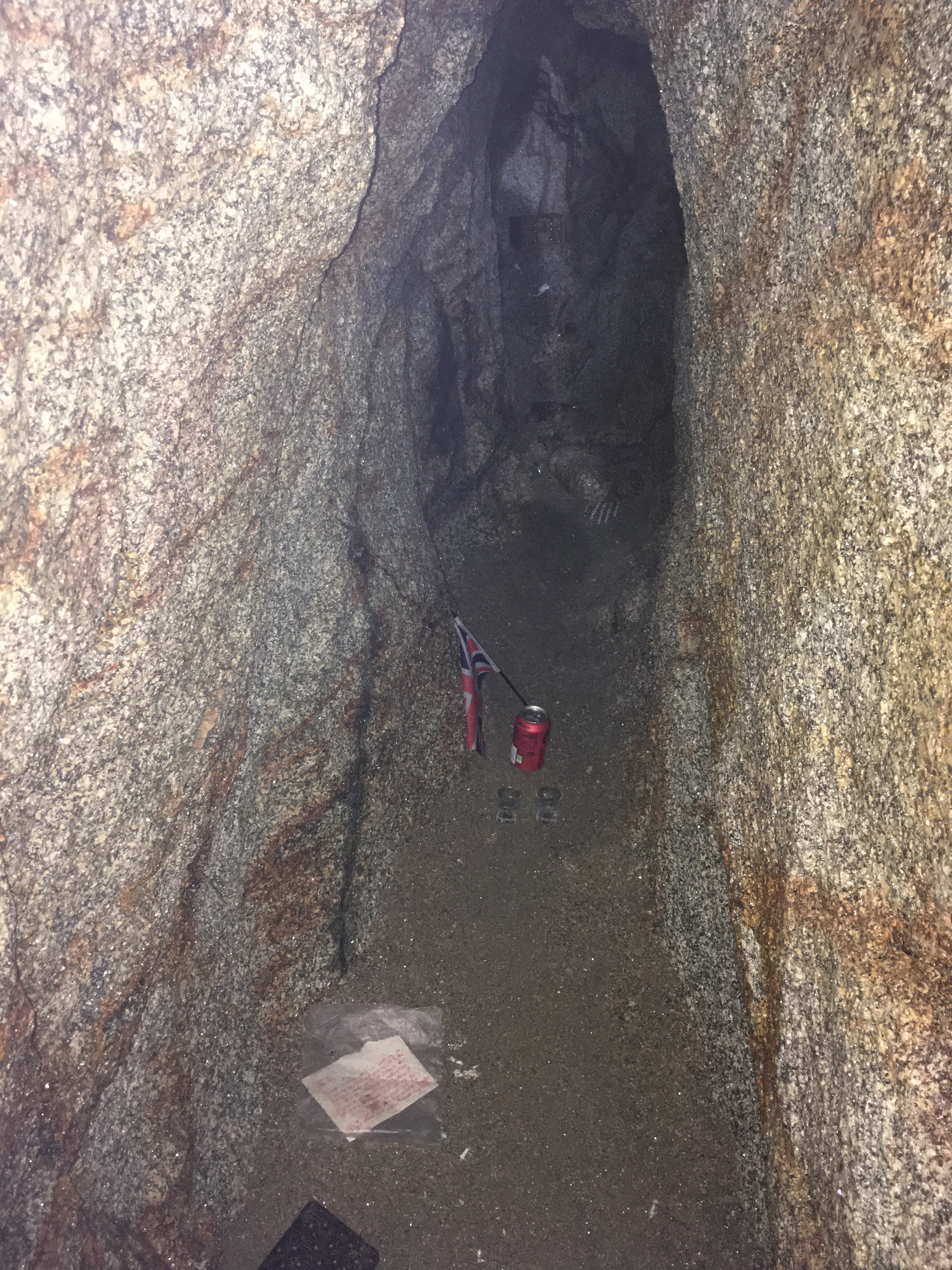
End of Piper's Hole, Tresco, with various items left by visitors
