= Chapman and Hewitt =

Chapman & Hewitt Ltd
- The Jubilee Queen at the boatyard
- Industry: Boat building, maintenance and storage
- Founded: 1971
- Founder: Brian Thomas Chapman and Jeffrey Hewitt
- Headquarters: Wadebridge
- Website: wadebridgeboatyard.co.uk

Chapman & Hewitt is a boat building service based on the Camel Estuary in Wadebridge, Cornwall.

== History ==
The business was started by Brian Thomas Chapman and Jeffrey Hewitt in 1971. The boatyard is in Trevilling Road in Wadebridge.

In 2023 the company changed its name to Wadebridge Boatyard Ltd.

== List of vessels ==
- Jubilee Queen 1977
- Apollo 3 1978 (a 30 feet (9.1 m) speedboat, scrapped 2001)
- Privateer 1979
- Firethorn (originally Firethorn of Bryher) 1991 (for Bryher Boat Services).
