= Arthur Dorrien-Smith =

Lord Proprietor of the Isles of Scilly from 1918 to 1920

Major Arthur Dorrien-Smith DSO, DL, JP
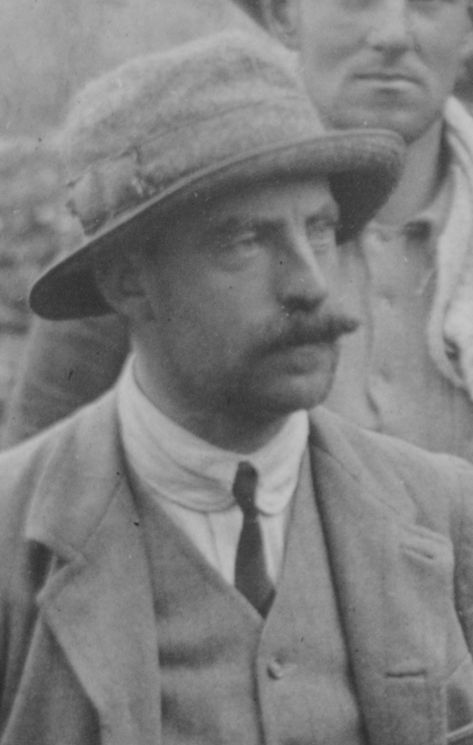
- Arthur Dorrien-Smith in 1907
- Born: 28 January 1876; Oxfordshire, England
- Died: 30 May 1955 (aged 79)
- Education: Eton college
- Title: Lord Proprietor of the Isles of Scilly
- Spouse: Eleanor Bowlby (m. 1909)
- Parents: Thomas Smith-Dorrien-Smith (father); Edith Smith-Dorrien-Smith (mother)

Major Arthur Algernon Dorrien-Smith DSO DL JP (28 January 1876 – 30 May 1955) was Lord Proprietor of the Isles of Scilly from 1918 to 1920.

== Family ==
Major Arthur Algernon Smith-Dorrien-Smith was born on 28 January 1876, in Oxfordshire, to Thomas Smith-Dorrien-Smith and Edith Anna Maria (née Tower). He married Eleanor Salvin Bowlby (died 13 April 1978), daughter of Edward Salvin Bowlby and Elizabeth Vans (née Agnew), on 11 May 1909 at Holy Trinity Church, Sloane Street, London. There were four sons and three daughters from this marriage:

- Captain Algernon Robert Augustus Dorrien-Smith (5 May 1910 – 20 May 1940, buried in Lapugnoy Military Cemetery, Pas de Calais, France) married Rosemarie Helen Lucas-Tooth
- Anne Elizabeth Dorrien-Smith (4 July 1911), married Claud Phillimore, 4th Baron Phillimore
- Lieutenant-Commander Thomas Mervyn Dorrien-Smith RN (12 May 1913 – 5 December 1973), married firstly Princess Tamar Bagration-Imeretinsky, secondly Margaret Claire "Peggy" Hugh-Jones
- Innis Mary Dorrien-Smith (8 May 1916), married William Somers Llewellyn
- Pilot Officer Lionel Roger Dorrien-Smith RAF (1918 – 20 May 1940, he has no known grave and is commemorated on panel 8 of the Runnymede Memorial in Bayeux Commonwealth War Graves Commission Cemetery)
- Major Francis Arthur Dorrien-Smith (26 August 1921 – 20 June 1944 buried in Bayeux Commonwealth War Graves Commission Cemetery)
- Helen Dorrien-Smith (12 December 1932 - 26 October 2015)

== Career ==
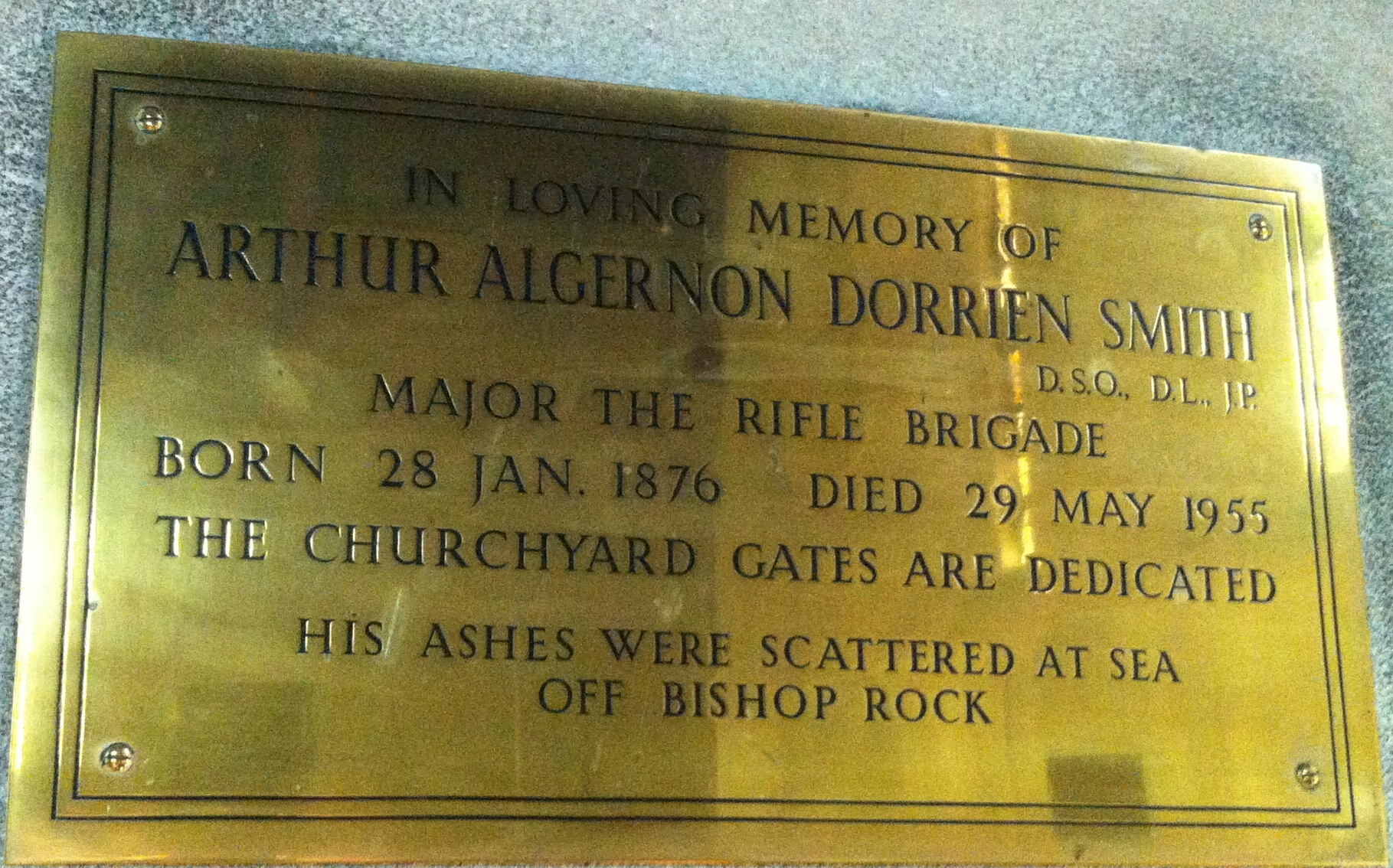
Memorial to Arthur Dorrien-Smith in St Nicholas's Church, Tresco

Dorrien-Smith was educated at Eton College.

He was commissioned a second lieutenant in the Rifle Brigade on 4 May 1898, and promoted to lieutenant on 3 February 1900. On the outbreak of the Second Boer War, his battalion was sent to South Africa, and he was mentioned in dispatches, and received the Distinguished Service Order (DSO) for his services during the war. He was promoted to captain on 22 January 1902. Following the end of hostilities in June 1902, he left Cape Town for England and returned to Southampton in early August. He was back with his battalion from January 1903. In 1904-5 he was an extra Aide-de-camp to Henry Northcote, 1st Baron Northcote, Governor-General of Australia, and retired in 1906, joining the Special Reserve. In the First World War he was Major, 6th Battalion (Reserve) Rifle Brigade, 1914; Brigade Major 17th Infantry Brigade, 1914–17; On the Staff 59th Division and 8th Corps, 1917–18.

On the death of his father in 1918, he succeeded as Lord Proprietor of the Isles of Scilly, a position he held until 1920 when the lease for the majority of the Isles of Scilly was handed back to the Duchy of Cornwall, Dorrien-Smith retaining control only over Tresco.

He continued the work of his father and developed Tresco Abbey Gardens making many trips to South Africa looking for suitable trees and plants. He went on the 1907 Sub-Antarctic Islands Scientific Expedition, which had as its primary object magnetic observation in the Auckland and Campbell Islands. Following the expedition he travelled widely in New Zealand, as well as making a shorter visit to Australia. In 1909 he again visited Australia, New Zealand and the Chatham Islands, and had a total collection of plants and seeds of about 2280 specimens. He was awarded the Victoria Medal of Honour by the Royal Horticultural Society in 1944.

He was appointed a Justice of the Peace for Cornwall, and on 31 January 1938, Deputy Lieutenant for Cornwall. He was a Fellow of the Linnean Society of London.

== Bibliography ==
- The southern islands expedition. Bulletin of Miscellaneous Information, Royal Botanic Gardens, Kew, 1908. 239–49.
- An account of a trip to the Nelson District of New Zealand in January. 1908. Ibid. 441–44.
- A botanizing expedition to West Australia in the spring (October), 1909. Journal of the Royal Horticultural Society 36: 1910, 285–93.
- An attempt to introduce Olearia semidentata into the British Isles. Bulletin of Miscellaneous Information, Royal Botanic Gardens, Kew, 1910, 120–6.
- Plants of Chatham Island. Journal of the Royal Horticultural Society 37, 1911, 57–64

Honorary titles
Preceded by Thomas Dorrien-Smith	Lord Proprietor of the Isles of Scilly; 1918–1920	title abolished
