= Council of the Isles of Scilly =

Local government authority in Cornwall

Council of the Isles of Scilly Konsel Syllan

Type
- Type: Sui generis authority of the Isles of Scilly

History
- Founded: 1891

Leadership
- Chair: Joel Williams, Independent since 21 May 2026
- Chief Executive: Russell Ashman since 12 January 2024

Structure
- Seats: 16 councillors
- Graph of the party split among 16 seats.
- Political groups: All parties (16) Independent (16)
- Length of term: 4 years

Elections
- Voting system: Multiple non-transferable vote
- Last election: 1 May 2025
- Next election: 3 May 2029

Meeting place
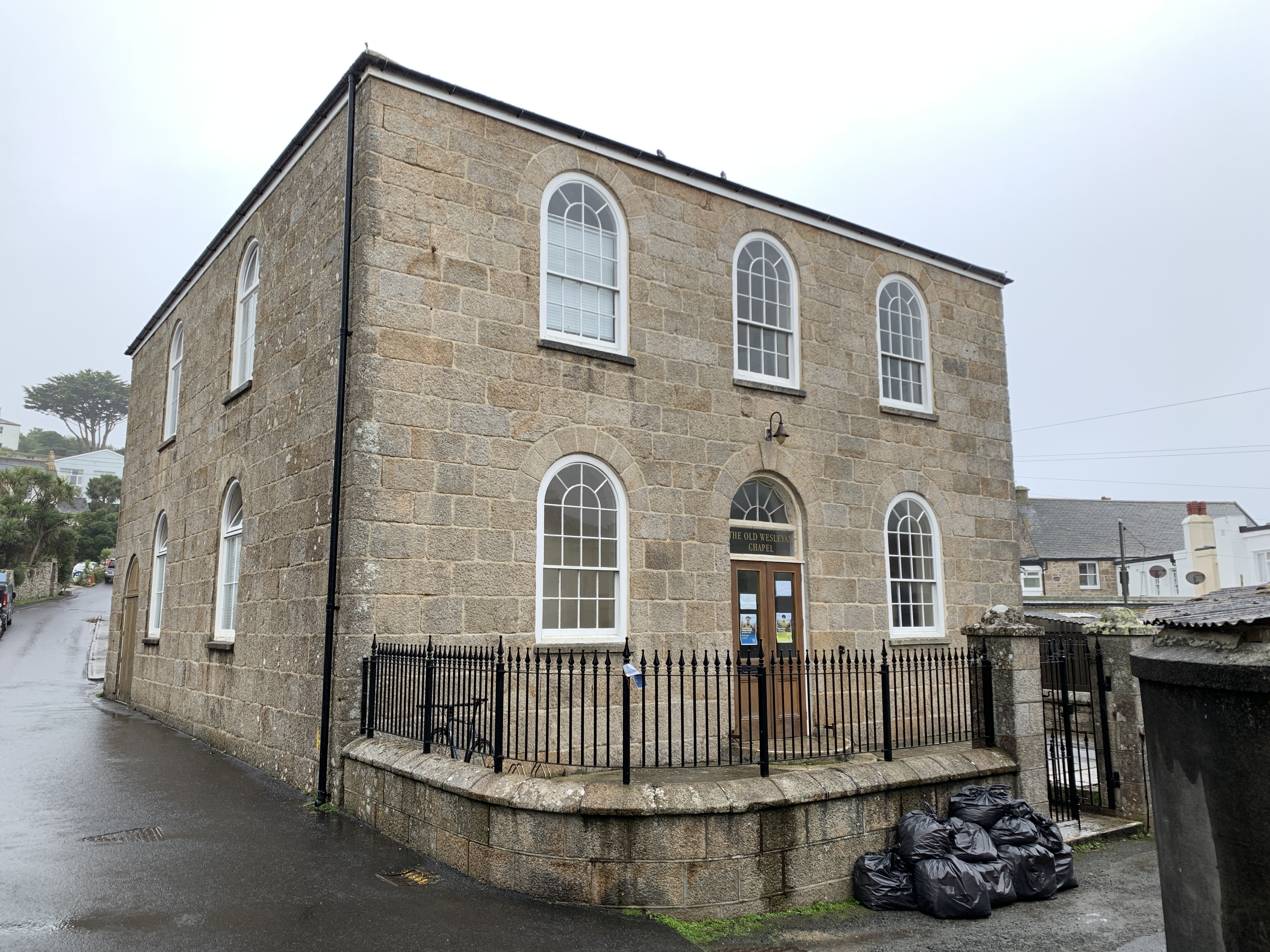
- Old Wesleyan Chapel, Garrison Lane, Hugh Town, St Mary's, Isles of Scilly, TR21 0JD

Website
- www.scilly.gov.uk

The Council of the Isles of Scilly (Cornish: Konsel Syllan) is a sui generis local government authority covering the Isles of Scilly in Cornwall, England. It is one of two local authorities in Cornwall, the other being the mainland Cornwall Council. It is currently made up of 16 councillors, all independents. The council was created in 1891. It meets at the Old Wesleyan Chapel and has its main offices at the Isles of Scilly Town Hall, both in Hugh Town on the main island of St Mary's.

== History ==
Historically, the Isles of Scilly were administered as one of the hundreds of Cornwall, although the Cornwall quarter sessions had limited jurisdiction there, due to the remote nature of the islands.

The need for a bespoke local government arrangement for the islands came from recognition of the particular difficulties of governing remote islands from mainland Cornwall. In addition to their distance from the mainland, several of the inhabited islands - Tresco, St Martin’s, St Agnes and Bryher - are themselves separated from St Mary’s, the largest and most populous island. The islands’ small population also made a conventional local government structure impractical.

The legal basis for a separate local authority in the Isles of Scilly was established by section 49 of the Local Government Act 1888. This allowed the Local Government Board to create a local authority for the islands separate from Cornwall County Council. The islands remained part of the ceremonial county of Cornwall, and the act provided for the Isles of Scilly to contribute financially to Cornwall County Council for services provided by Cornwall for the benefit of the islands.

The Council of the Isles of Scilly was created by the Local Government Board's Provisional Order Confirmation (No. 6) Act 1890 and came into being in 1891. The powers of the Council were further developed by the Isles of Scilly Order 1930, which applied provisions of the Local Government Act 1929 to the islands "as if the Isles of Scilly were an administrative county". This effectively gave the Council of the Isles of Scilly powers comparable to those of a county council.

The Local Government Act 1972, which reorganised local government in England, preserved the islands’ special local government arrangements. Section 265 of the Act continued the mechanism by which the islands could contribute to Cornwall County Council for services provided by Cornwall.

Because of the council's unique status, acts of Parliament defining local government powers have generally made express provision for how those powers may be applied to the islands. In practice, where powers are to be extended to the Isles of Scilly, a government minister must usually make an order applying the relevant statutory provisions to the islands.

On 17 April 1986, Roy Duncan, the then Chairman of the Council, and Dutch Ambassador Jonkheer Huydecoper symbolically declared peace between the Isles of Scilly and the Netherlands, ending the so-called Three Hundred and Thirty Five Years' War, an alleged state of war between the two.

The council was a member of the Islands Forum from 2022 until it was disbanded in 2026.

== Governance ==
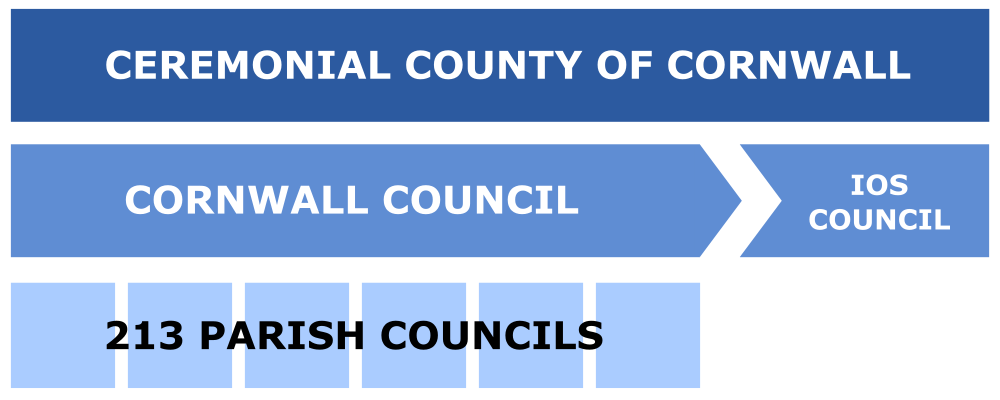
The Council of the Isles of Scilly is one of two councils within Cornwall.

The council is responsible for all local government functions on the islands. It also performs the administrative functions of the AONB Partnership and the Inshore Fisheries and Conservation Authority.

Some aspects of local government are shared with Cornwall, including health, and the Council of the Isles of Scilly together with Cornwall Council form a local enterprise partnership. In July 2015 a devolution deal was announced by the government under which Cornwall Council and the Council of the Isles of Scilly are to create a plan to bring health and social care services together under local control. The Local Enterprise Partnership is also to be bolstered.

Where joint bodies are set up in cooperation with Cornwall Council, the term "Cornwall and the Isles of Scilly" is commonly used. The name refers to cooperation between the two Cornish councils, and does not indicate that the Isles of Scilly are not part of Cornwall. The following joint bodies are in existence:

- Cornwall and Isles of Scilly Climate Commission
- Cornwall and Isles of Scilly Creative Industries Sector Body
- Cornwall and Isles of Scilly Economic Forum
- Cornwall and Isles of Scilly Fairness Commission
- Cornwall and Isles of Scilly Growth and Skills Hub
- Cornwall and Isles of Scilly Historic Environment Record
- Cornwall and Isles of Scilly Integrated Care Board
- Cornwall and Isles of Scilly Integrated Care System
- Cornwall and Isles of Scilly Leadership Board
- Cornwall and Isles of Scilly Local Nature Partnership
- Cornwall and Isles of Scilly Shared Prosperity Fund
- Cornwall and Isles of Scilly Strategic Housing Group
- Cornwall and Isles of Scilly Workforce and Skills Board

As of 2015, 130 people are employed full-time by the council to provide local services (including water supply and air traffic control). These numbers are significant, in that almost ten per cent of the adult population of the islands is directly linked to the council, as an employee or a councillor.

=== Political control ===
The main national political parties do not routinely field candidates for elections to the Council of the Isles of Scilly. Since the 2009 elections, all but two of the candidates have been independents. Two Green Party candidates stood in 2013, but neither was elected. The elected council has therefore entirely comprised independent councillors since at least 2009.

Party in control	Years
Independent	pre-2009–present

=== Leadership ===
Political leadership is provided by the chairman of the council, unlike in other English local authorities where the chairman is now a largely ceremonial role. The chairmen since the formation of the council in 1891 have been:

Councillor	Party	From	To
Thomas Dorrien-Smith		1891	1918
Arthur Dorrien-Smith		1919	1955
George Woodcock		1955	1960
Roland Gibson		1960	1964
Tregarthen Mumford		1964	1972
Tom Dorrien-Smith		1972	1973
Samuel Ellis		1974	1981
William Mumford		1981	1985
Roy Duncan		1985	1992
Patrick Greenlaw		1992	1996
Mike Hicks		1996	1997
Colin Daly		1997	1999
Dudley Mumford		1999	2005
Christine Savill	Independent	2005	Jun 2009
Julia Day	Independent	23 Jun 2009	Sep 2010
Mike Hicks	Independent	23 Sep 2010	28 Mar 2013
Amanda Martin	Independent	21 May 2013	May 2017
Ted Moulson	Independent	25 May 2017	May 2018
Robert Francis	Independent	8 May 2018	21 May 2026
Joel Williams	Independent	21 May 2026	

== Premises ==
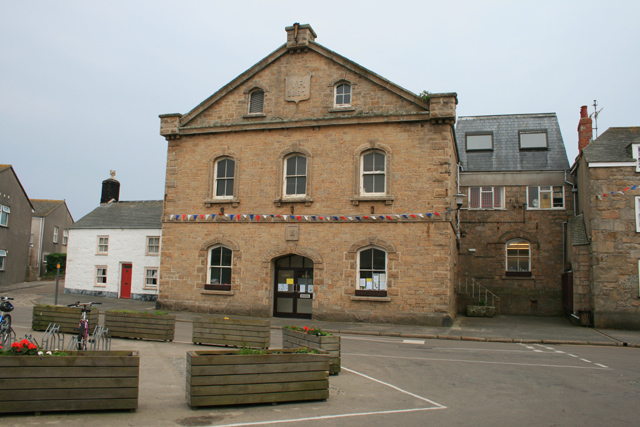
Isles of Scilly Town Hall, The Parade, Hugh Town, St Mary's, Isles of Scilly, TR21 0LW: Council's offices

The council has its offices at the Isles of Scilly Town Hall on The Parade in Hugh Town on St Mary's, the largest island. The town hall was built in 1887–1889. Council meetings are held a short distance away at the council chamber, which is the Old Wesleyan Chapel on Garrison Lane, which was built in 1828.

== Elections ==
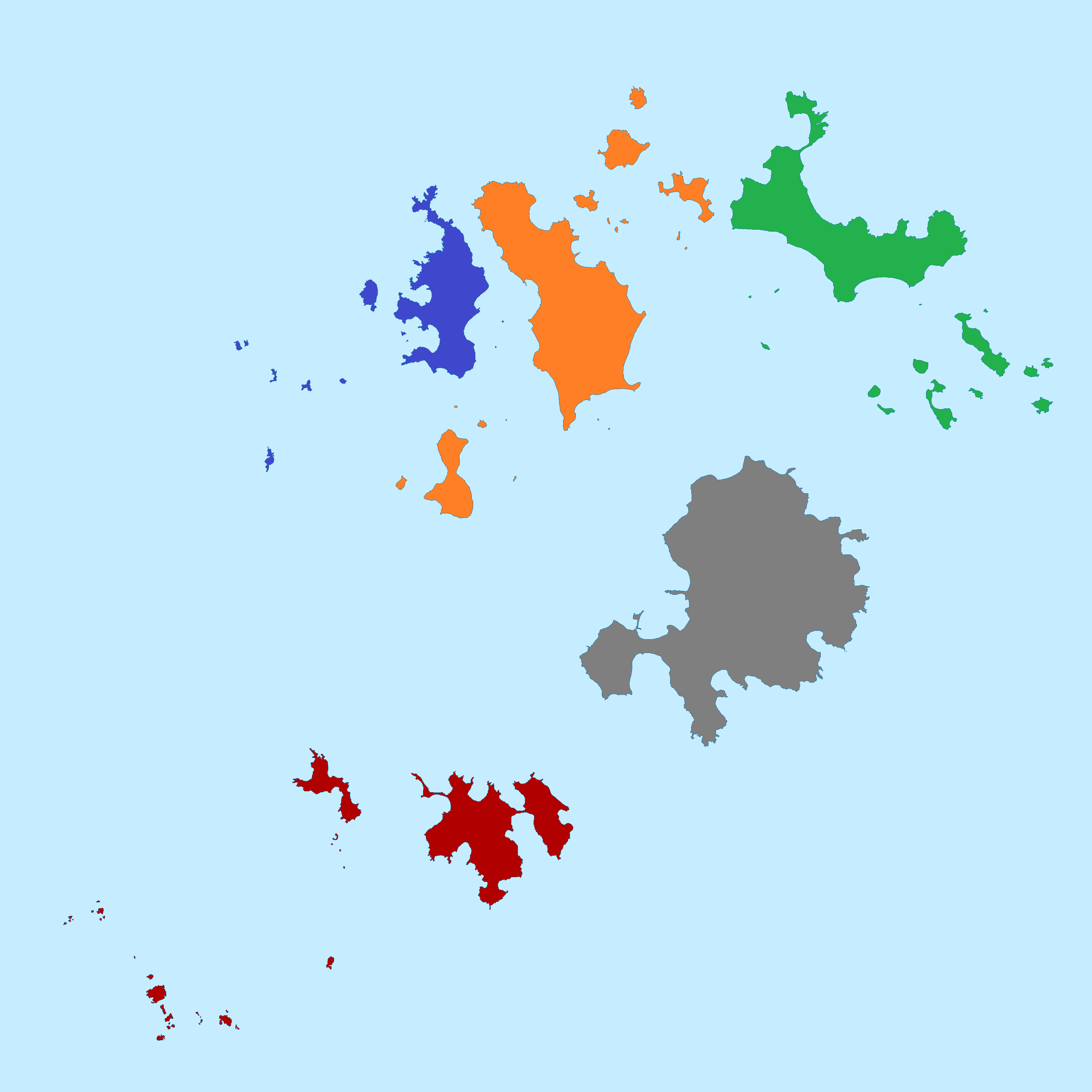
The five wards (which are also the civil parishes) of the Isles of Scilly; St Agnes Bryher St Martin's St Mary's Tresco

The council consists of 16 elected councillors: 12 of these are returned by the ward of St Mary's, and one from each of four "off-island" wards (St Martin's, St Agnes, Bryher, and Tresco). The number of councillors elected in each ward was reduced by one for the 2017 local elections; there had previously been 21 councillors, with the same ward boundaries.

Whilst each of the inhabited isles is formally a civil parish, none of them possess a council or meeting in their own right.
