= Tresco, Isles of Scilly =

Island of the Isles of Scilly, England

Coordinates: 49°57′15″N 06°19′57″W

Tresco: Cornish: Enys Skaw
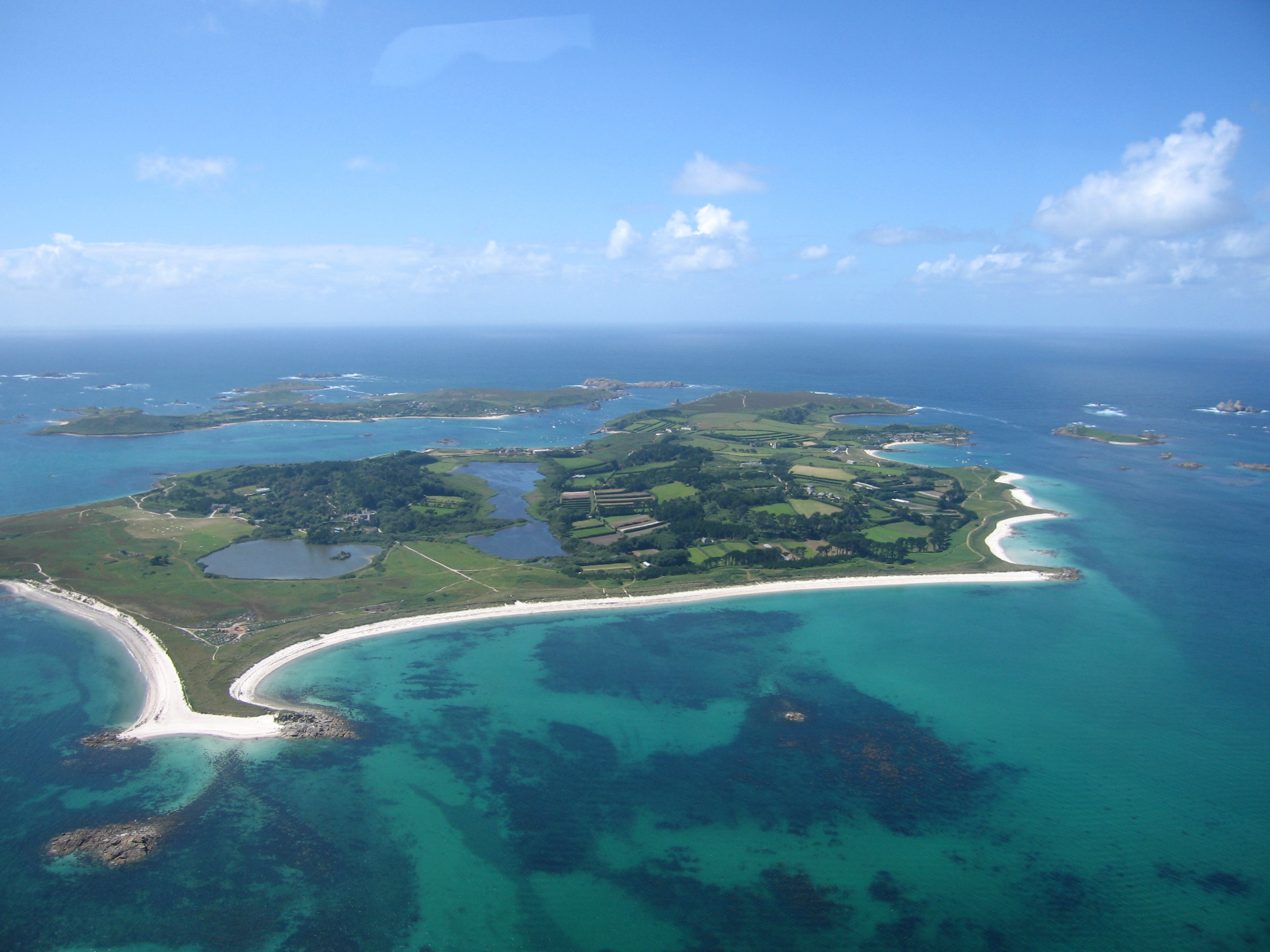
- Aerial view of Tresco

- Location within Isles of Scilly
- Population: 175 (2011)
- OS grid reference: SV894147
- Civil parish: Tresco
- Unitary authority: Isles of Scilly
- Ceremonial county: Cornwall
- Region: South West
- Country: England
- Sovereign state: United Kingdom
- Post town: ISLES OF SCILLY
- Postcode district: TR24
- Dialling code: 01720
- Police: Devon and Cornwall
- Fire: Isles of Scilly
- Ambulance: South Western
- UK Parliament: St Ives

Tresco (Cornish: Enys Skaw, lit. 'island of elder-trees') is the second-biggest island of the Isles of Scilly. It is 297 ha (1.15 sq mi) in area, measuring about 3.5 km (2.2 mi) by 1.75 km (1.09 mi).

== Name ==
The original name for the island (including Bryher) was the Cornish: Ryn Tewyn, meaning "promontory of sand-dunes". In 1193, when the island was granted to the Abbot of Tavistock by Pope Celestine III, the island was known as St. Nicholas's island, and by 1305 it was called Trescau (farm of elder-trees). By 1540, this name had changed to Iniscaw (island of elder-trees). The island was named as Trescaw in an 1814 publication.

== History ==
In early times one group of islands was in the possession of a confederacy of hermits. King Henry I gave it to Tavistock Abbey, which established a priory on Tresco (later abolished during the Dissolution of the Monasteries). The priory was given the care of souls in the secular islands by the lord of the fief. In 1233, a prior here, known as Alan of Cornwall, was made Abbot of Tavistock.

The island is administered for the Crown by the Duchy of Cornwall and is leased to the Dorrien-Smith estate, which runs it as a timeshare business. The current leaseholder is Robert Dorrien-Smith. Members of the Dorrien-Smith family (descended from Augustus Smith) held the position of Lord Proprietors of the Scilly Islands between 1834 and 1920.

From 2001 until 2009, the island hosted a marathon run organised to benefit the Cystic Fibrosis Trust, consisting of 7½ laps around the island. The event was held on the same day as the London Marathon. Past winners include Dara O'Kearney. It was replaced by a sprint triathlon.

In 2007 a rebuild of the Abbey Farm/Shed area was completed; this area was RNAS Tresco, a seaplane base during the First World War.

== Geography ==
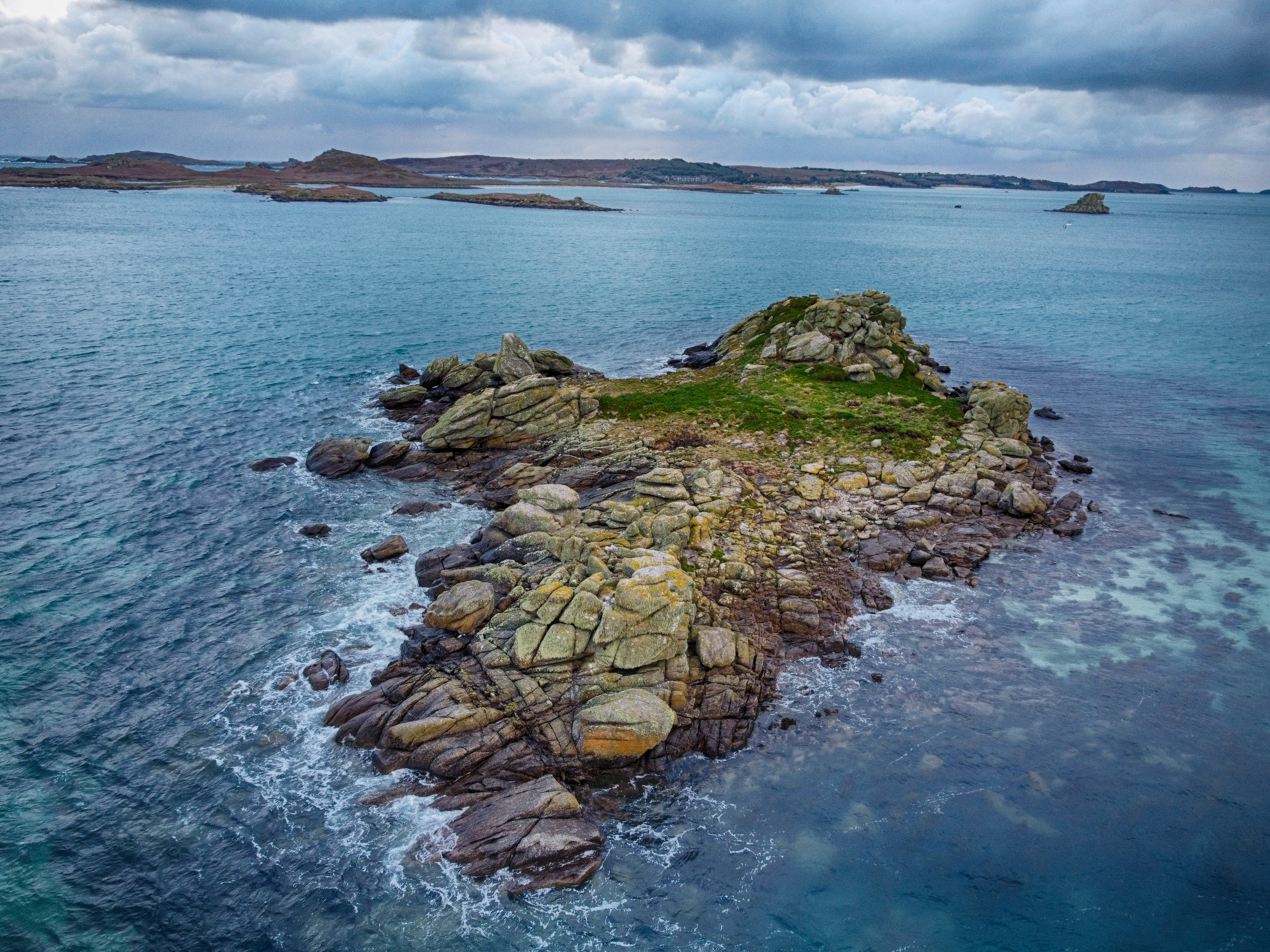
View looking back to Tresco, Isles of Scilly.

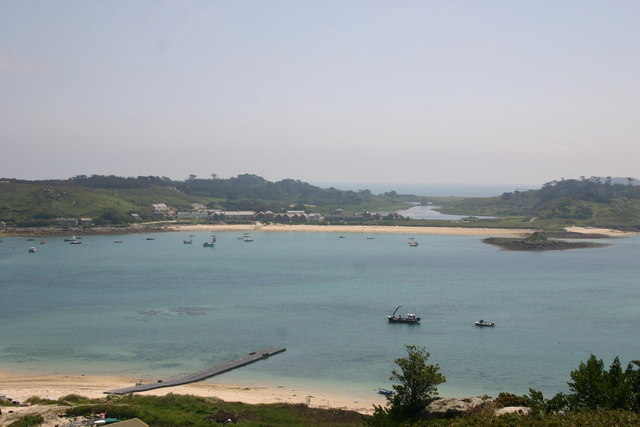
Tresco seen from Bryher.

A variety of scenery is found on the island, including rugged granite outcrops, heathland of the exposed north coast and mainly shell beaches in the east and south. The variety of its scenery and geomorphology is partly a result of the last ice age, when the Devensian ice sheet clipped the north side of the island, leaving deformation till deposits.

The main settlements are New Grimsby and Old Grimsby in the central part of the island. Combined, their facilities include a convenience store (with a post office sub-branch), an art gallery, a pub, and two café/restaurants, all of which are owned and run by the Tresco Estate. At the south of the island are the sub-tropical Tresco Abbey Gardens, including the Valhalla Figurehead Collection, and Tresco Heliport. To the north of New Grimsby are King Charles's Castle and Cromwell's Castle.

== Civil parish and ward ==
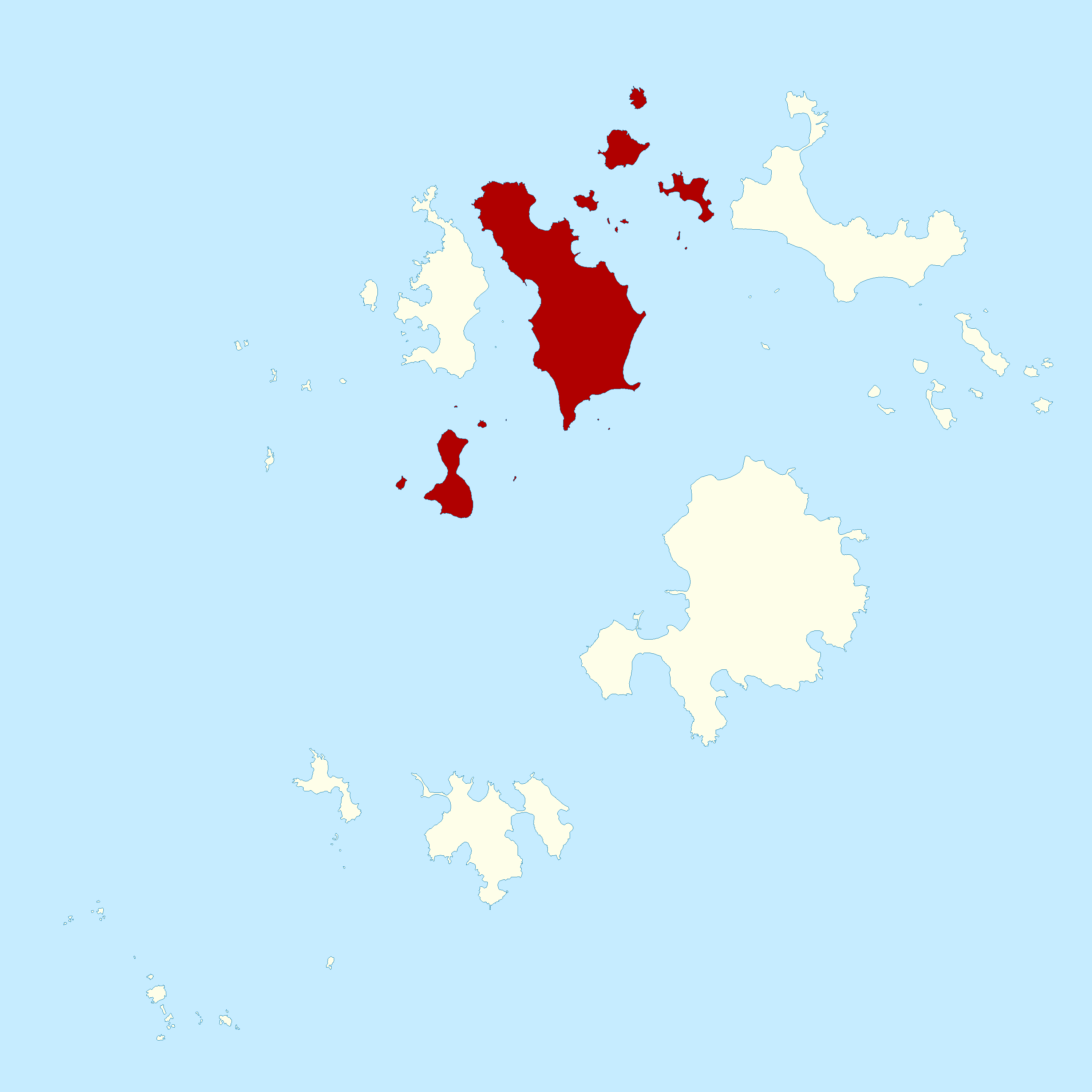
The Isles of Scilly comprising the civil parish and ward of Tresco, shown in red.

Tresco is one of the five civil parishes of the Isles of Scilly, which are also wards. The civil parish and ward covers much more than the island of Tresco: it includes uninhabited islands such as Samson (inhabited until 1855), Teän, St Helen's, Northwethel and Round Island. Tresco elects one councillor to the Council of the Isles of Scilly, the same as the other "off-island" wards. The civil parish is not functional, however, and there is no council or meeting.

== Demography ==
These figures include permanent residents only. A large number of seasonal staff also reside on the island during the summer.

Population
City	Population
1841	430
1861	399
1871	266
1891	315
1901	331
1911	315
1921	217
1931	248
1951	243
1961	283
1971	246
1991	170
2001	180
2011	175

== Economy ==
Unlike the other Scilly islands, Tresco is primarily run as a holiday resort, and virtually all activity and employment is tourist-related. On the other islands tourism is important, but does not dominate to the same extent.

== Landmarks ==
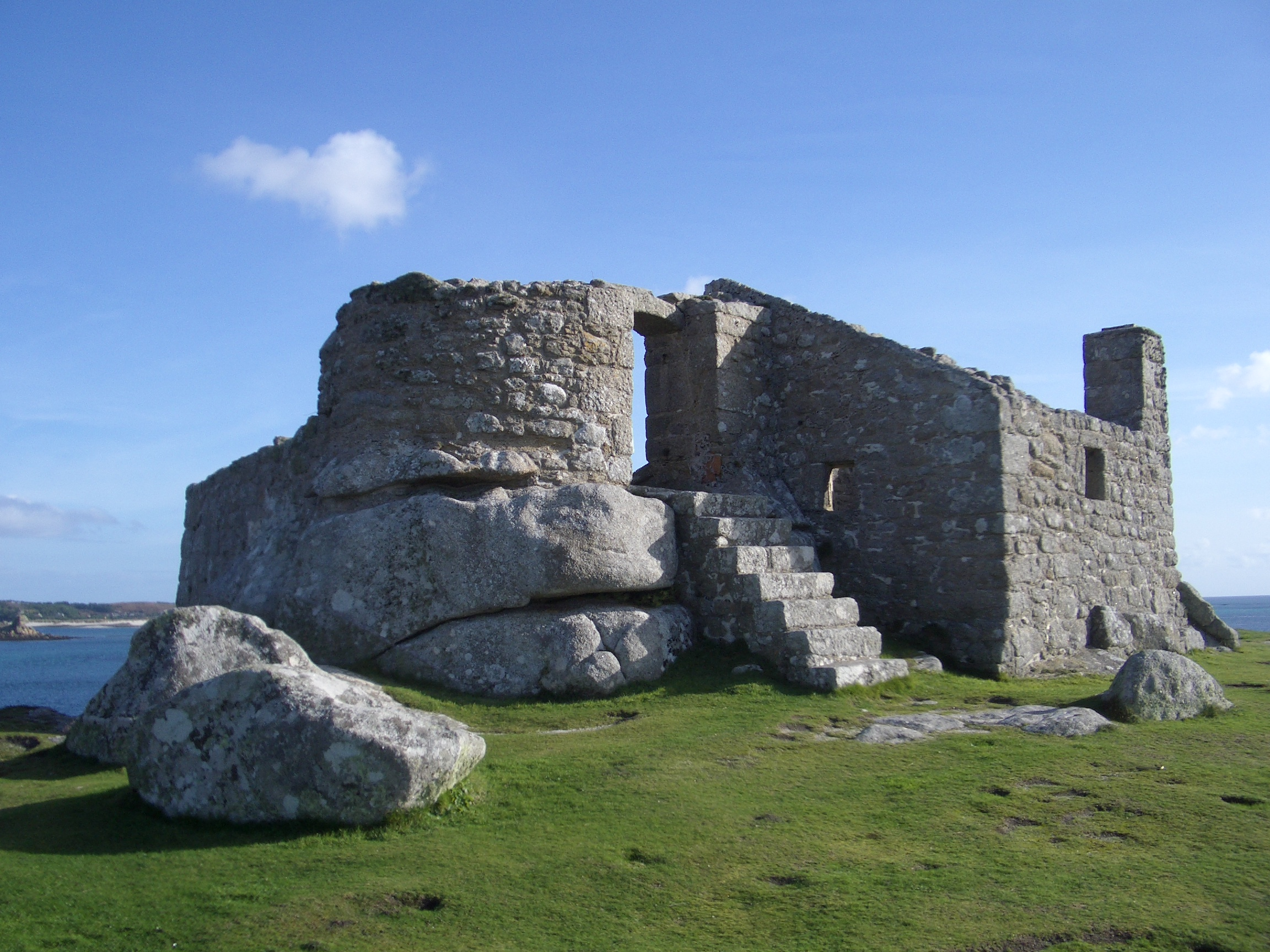
The Old Blockhouse, Tresco

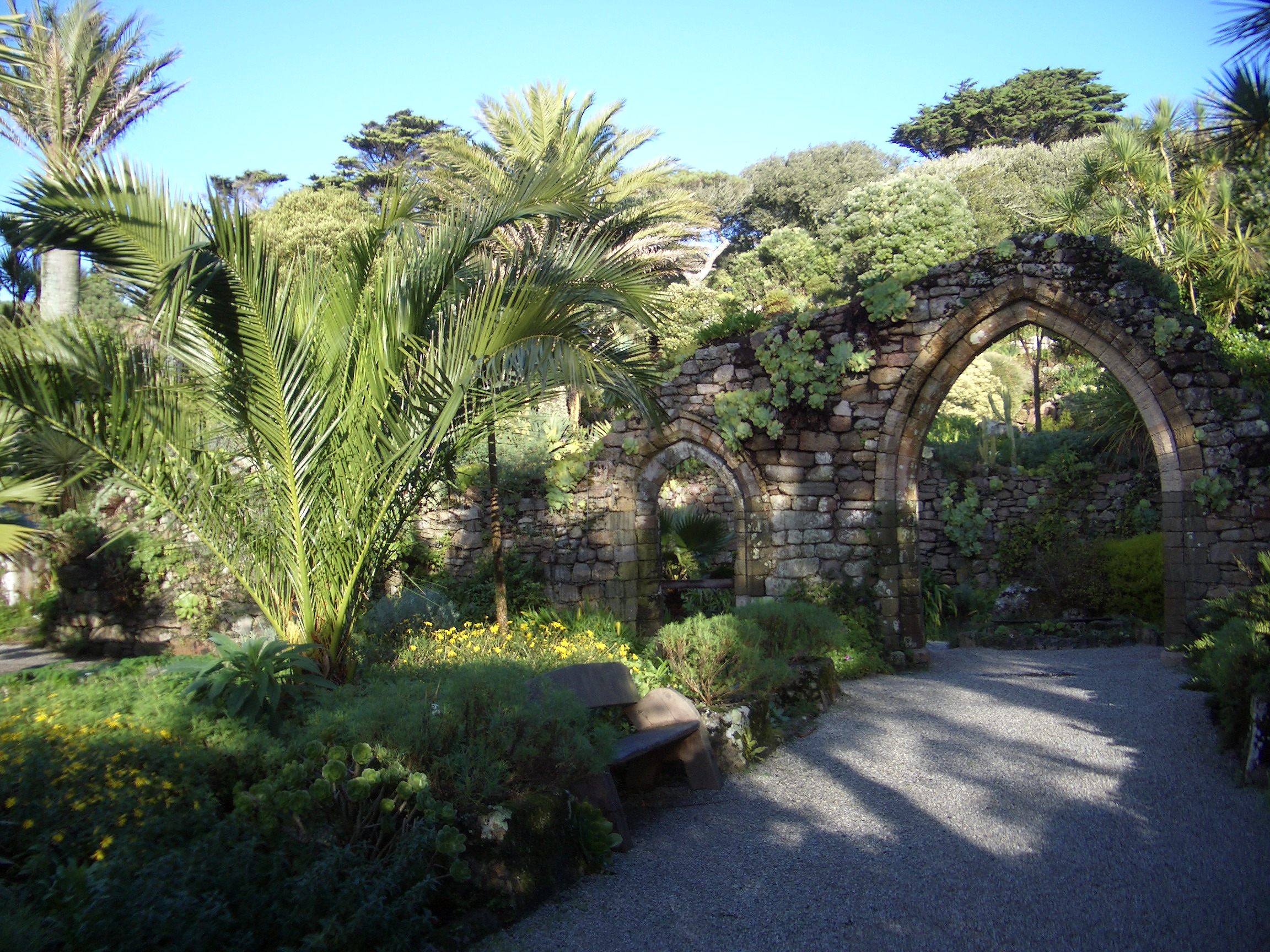
The arch from the wall of the mediaeval monastery in Tresco Abbey Gardens

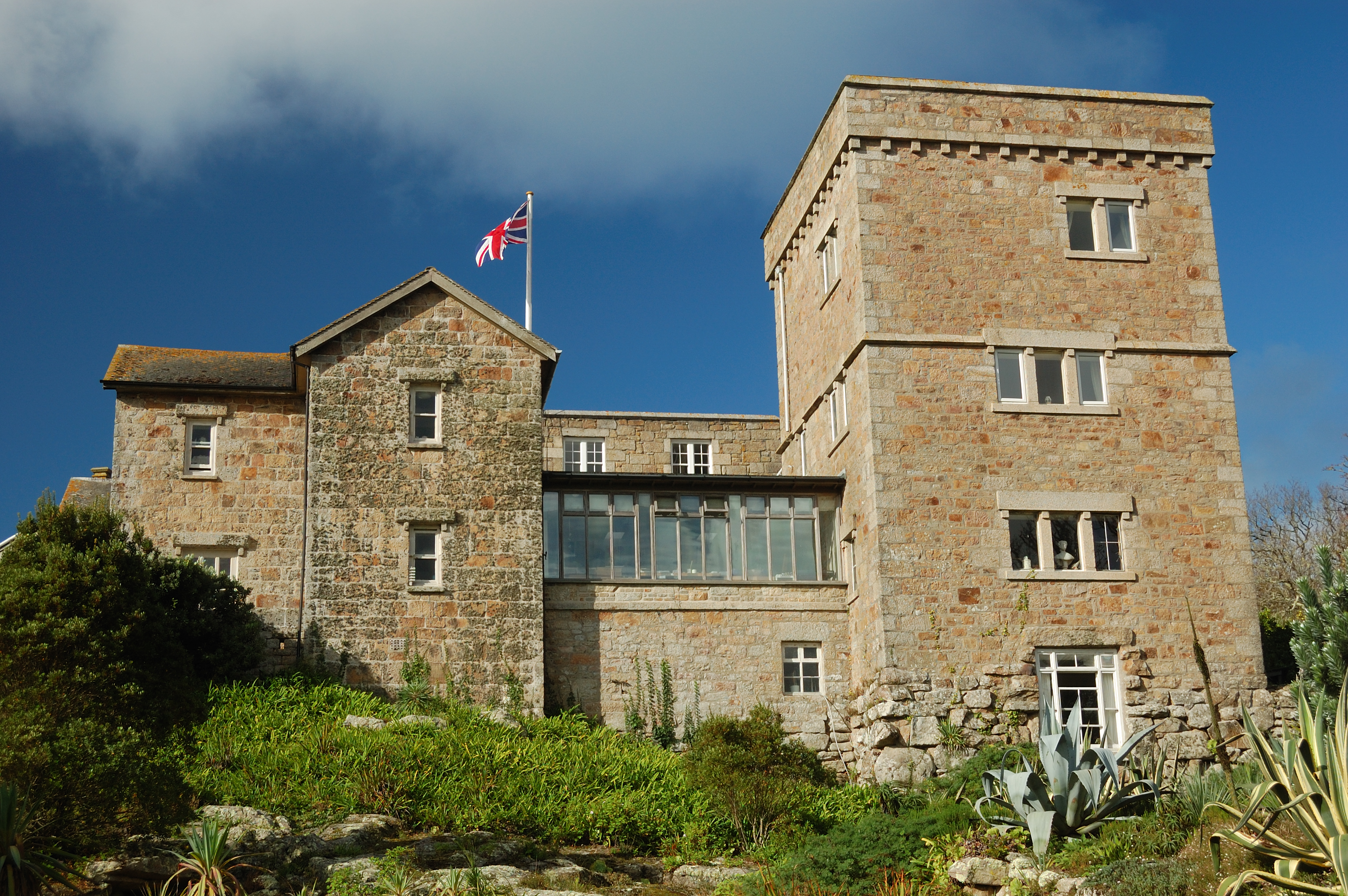
Tresco Abbey

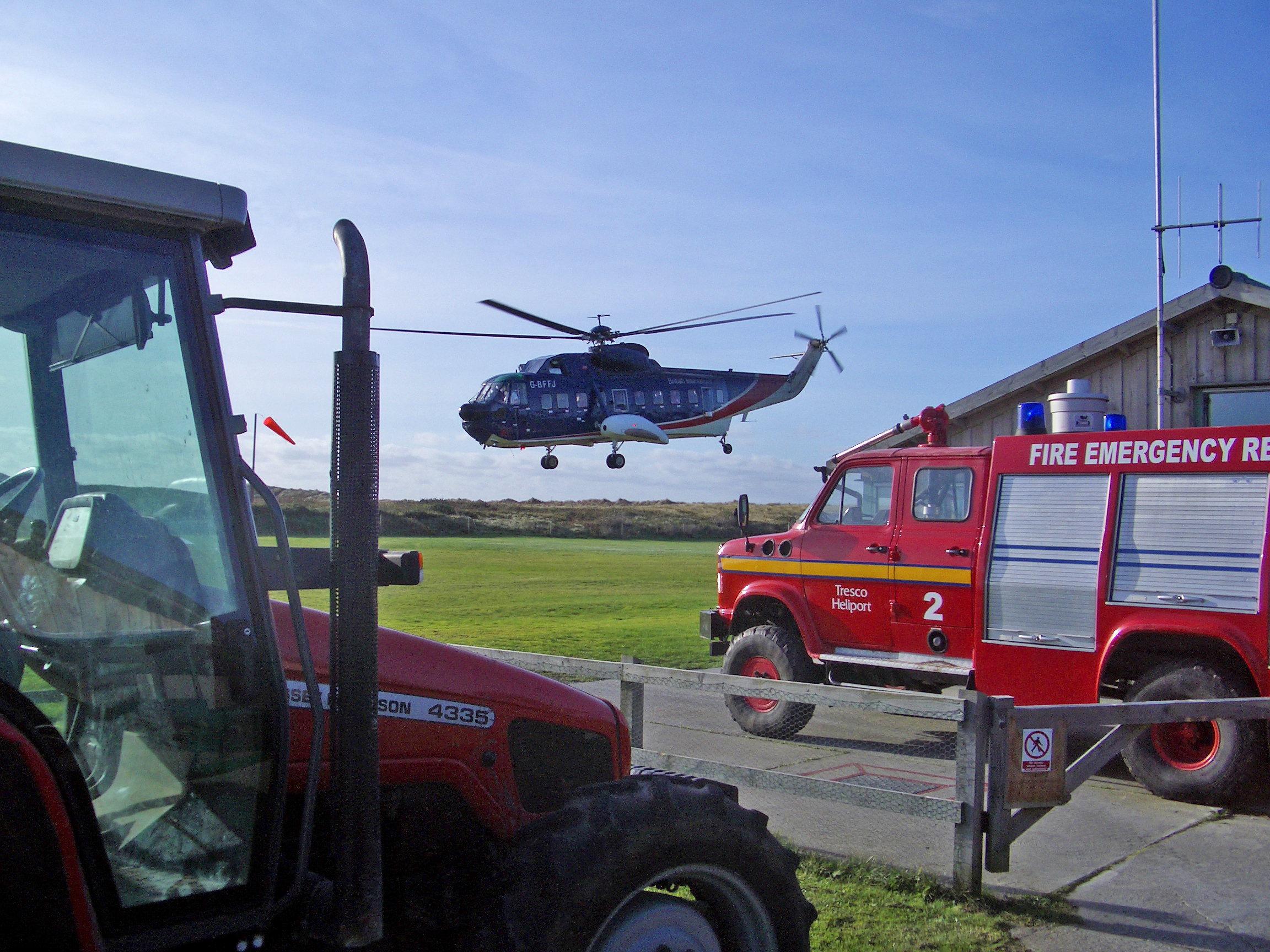
Helicopter leaving Tresco at Tresco Heliport

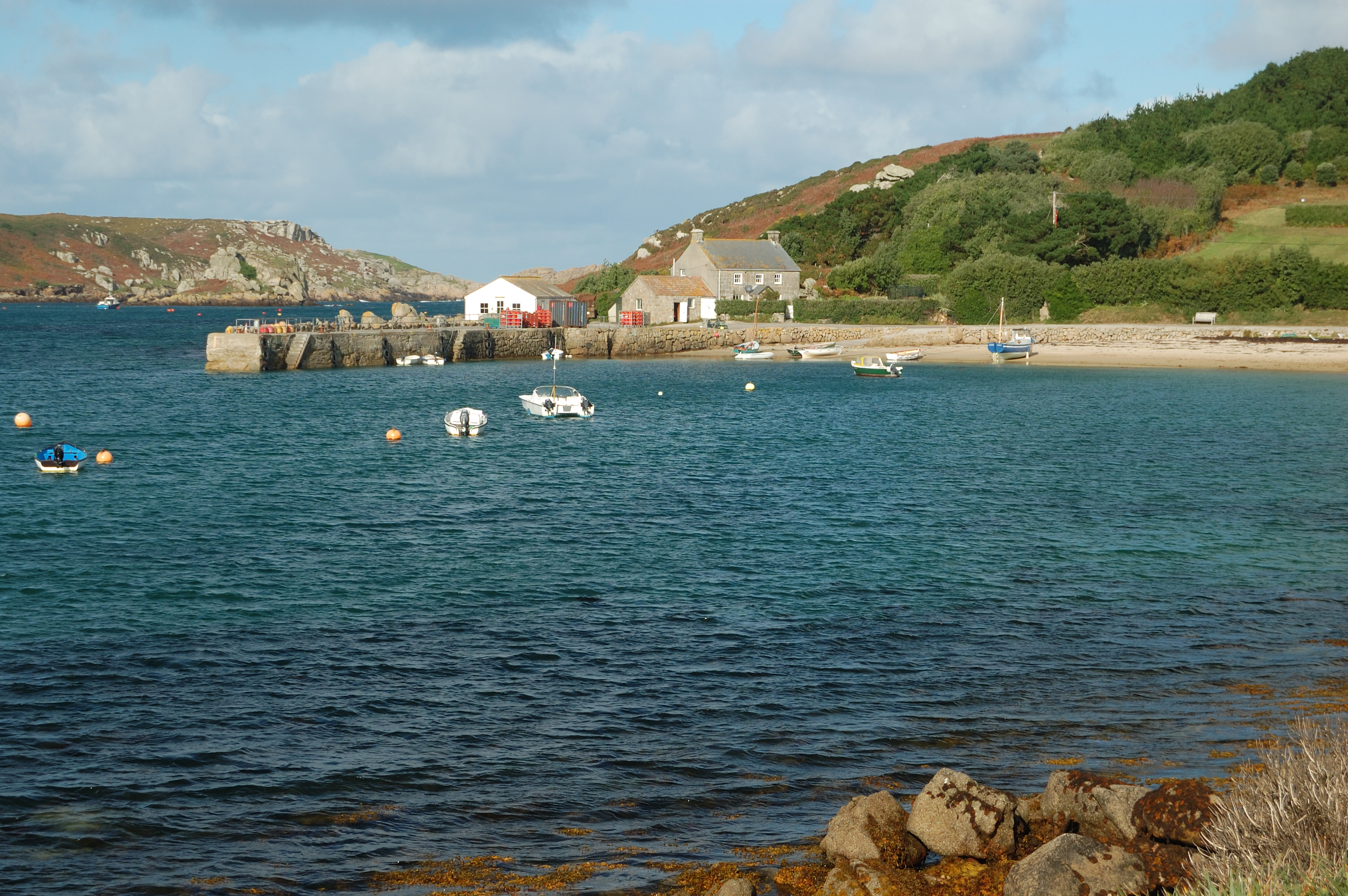
High-tide landing pier at New Grimsby

English Civil War

- King Charles's Castle dates from 1550–54, and was occupied by the Royalists during the English Civil War. It was later partially demolished to provide the building materials for Cromwell's Castle.
- A coastal tower known as Cromwell's Castle was built 1651–52 with a gun platform added around 1740 by Abraham Tovey, Master Gunner.
- The Old Blockhouse gun tower protecting Old Grimsby harbour, vigorously defended during the Civil War, was probably built between 1548 and 1552.
- Oliver's Battery, in the south of the island, by the Carn Near quay, was erected shortly after the capture of Tresco by Parliamentary forces in the English Civil War. It was built by Admiral Robert Blake.

Other landmarks

- Monument to Augustus Smith, above Appletree Bay on the south west of the island (Grade II listed building, List Entry Number 1141199).
- Remains of St Nicholas' Priory, Tresco, in Tresco Abbey Gardens (Grade II listed building, List Entry Number 1141172; and Scheduled Monument, List Entry Number 1016184).
- Anglican church: see St Nicholas's Church, Tresco.

== Education ==
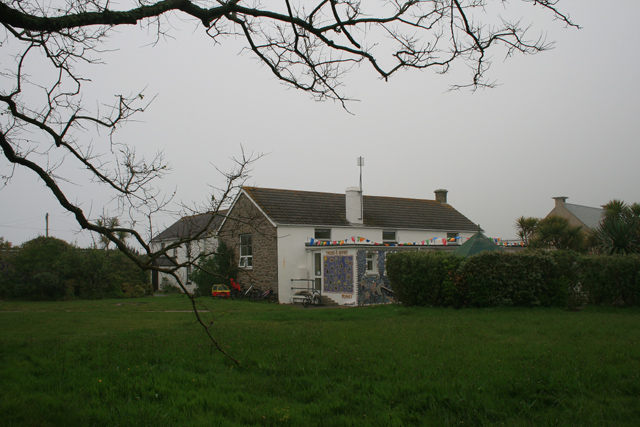
Tresco & Bryher Base

Five Islands Academy (previously Five Islands School) has its Tresco and Bryher Base, a primary campus in Tresco. Secondary pupils board at the St Mary's main campus, staying there on weekdays and coming back and forth to their home islands on weekends.

Students at the sixth-form college level reside and board elsewhere, in mainland Great Britain. Previously the Learning and Skills Council paid for costs of accommodation for sixth-formers.

== Transport ==
Tresco is a car-free island. Electric vehicles are used to transport overnight visitors to and from Tresco Heliport and from the various quays, and a few golf carts are available for disabled visitors.

Boat services to other islands are provided by Tresco Boat Services.

From Tresco Heliport, a year-round helicopter service connects Tresco to Penzance Heliport on the mainland. From 1983 to cessation in 2012, the service was operated by British International Helicopters. In 2020, helicopter service was resumed from a new Penzance Heliport to Tresco and St Mary's, operated by Penzance Helicopters.

== Wildlife and ecology ==
Tresco is unique amongst the off islands in that its habitat ranges from a windswept northern plateau with waved heath to sheltered bulb fields, wetland and lakes, to beautiful beaches backed by a sand dune system on the south coast. The forerunner of Natural England designated three Sites of Special Scientific Interest (SSSI) in 1971 and 1976. They are the Castle Down (Tresco) SSSI, Great Pool (Tresco) SSSI and Pentle Bay, Merrick and Round Islands SSSI. Castle Down is a SSSI for its waved maritime heath, its lichen flora, a breeding colony of Common Tern (Sterna hirundo) and for its geology. Great Pool is an SSSI because it is the largest area of fresh water in the islands and important for its breeding birds, and as a sheltering and feeding area for migrants. Pentle Bay is designated for the transition from a flora-rich sand dune system to lichen-rich heath.

In October 2012, four male and one female Red Squirrel (Sciurus vulgaris), on permanent loan from the British Wildlife Centre, were transported to Tresco by helicopter. Only two survived, but in September 2013 a further twenty were transported to Tresco and released in Abbey Woods, near the Abbey Gardens. Tresco is considered to be a ″safe haven″ for the endangered mammal as it is free from predators such as foxes, and from grey squirrels and the squirrel pox they carry. In June 2014, an unknown number of baby squirrels have been pictured in the Abbey Gardens, proving the squirrels are successfully breeding.

=== Vagrant birds ===
Among the many vagrant birds which have been found here, the following were firsts for Britain:

- Common Nighthawk (Chordeiles minor), collected on 17 September 1927.
- Black-billed Cuckoo (Coccyzus erythrophthalmus), collected on 27 October 1932.
- Northern Parula (Setophaga americana), seen 16–17 October 1966.
- Western Sandpiper (Calidris mauri), originally identified as a Semipalmated Sandpiper, 19 August 1969.
- Yellow-bellied Sapsucker (Sphyrapicus varius), seen 26 September – 6 October 1975.

The island also briefly hosted the second British record of Great Blue Heron (Ardea herodias) in April and May 2015, which also visited both Bryher and St Mary's during its 23-day stay.

== Cultural references ==
Because of its geography and history, Tresco has often featured in fiction, most notably in the books of author Sam Llewellyn, a direct descendant of Augustus Smith who, after his appointment as Lord Proprietor of the Scillies in 1834 and living on the island, began to create the Abbey Gardens on land which surrounded the old Priory.

- Why the Whales Came by Michael Morpurgo is set in the Isles of Scilly and features Tresco several times.
- Hell Bay (1984), by Sam Llewellyn, is set on Tresco and fictionalises the events leading up to Augustus Smith taking ownership of the island.
- The Sea Garden (1999), also by Sam Llewellyn, is set on a fictional island based heavily on Tresco. It features a stunning Sea Garden much like the Tresco Abbey Gardens and the history of the fictional island draws heavily from the real history of the island.

== Filmography ==
- In the 1989 BBC adaptation of The Voyage of the Dawn Treader, the scenes on the fictional Lone Islands were filmed on Tresco, with the on-ship scenes being filmed on a ship on the surrounding sea.
- Tresco is the setting for the 2010 film Archipelago, directed by Joanna Hogg and starring Tom Hiddleston. It premiered at the 2010 London Film Festival, and was released on 4 March 2011 in the U.K. and Ireland.
- In the early 1980s Tresco was used by the group Blondie for the location of filming the video to the song "Island of Lost Souls".

== Notable inhabitants ==
- Sam Llewellyn (b. 1948), author.
- John Deason (1829–1915), gold miner, co-discoverer of the world's largest gold nugget.

== See also ==
- Listed buildings in Tresco, Isles of Scilly
- List of shipwrecks of the Isles of Scilly
