= Palinurus (disambiguation) =

Palinurus is a mythological figure, often portrayed as a helmsman, navigator or guide.

Palinurus may also refer to:

== Ships and boats ==
- HCS Palinurus (1823), a sloop or brig built for Bombay Marine, the naval arm of the British East India Company
- Palinurus, a ship wrecked off the Isles of Scilly in 1848
- Palinurus, formerly Luciole (barge), a hotel barge on the French canal system
- USC&GS Palinurus, commanded by Richardson Clover (1846–1919)

== Other uses ==
- 4832 Palinurus, a Jupiter trojan asteroid
- Palinurus (crustacean), a genus of spiny lobsters in the family Palinuridae
- Palinurus, the pseudonym of Cyril Connolly as author of The Unquiet Grave (1944)
- Palinurus of Mexico, the translation of a 1976 novel by Fernando del Paso
- Strait of Palinurus and Bay of Palinurus, classical albedo features on Mars

== See also ==
- Conus ammiralis var. palinurus, a sea snail
- Palinure (disambiguation)
- Palinuro (disambiguation)
