= List of shipwrecks of the Isles of Scilly (19th century) =

The list of shipwrecks of the Isles of Scilly is a list of ships which sank on or near the Isles of Scilly. The list includes ships that sustained a damaged hull, which were later refloated and repaired.

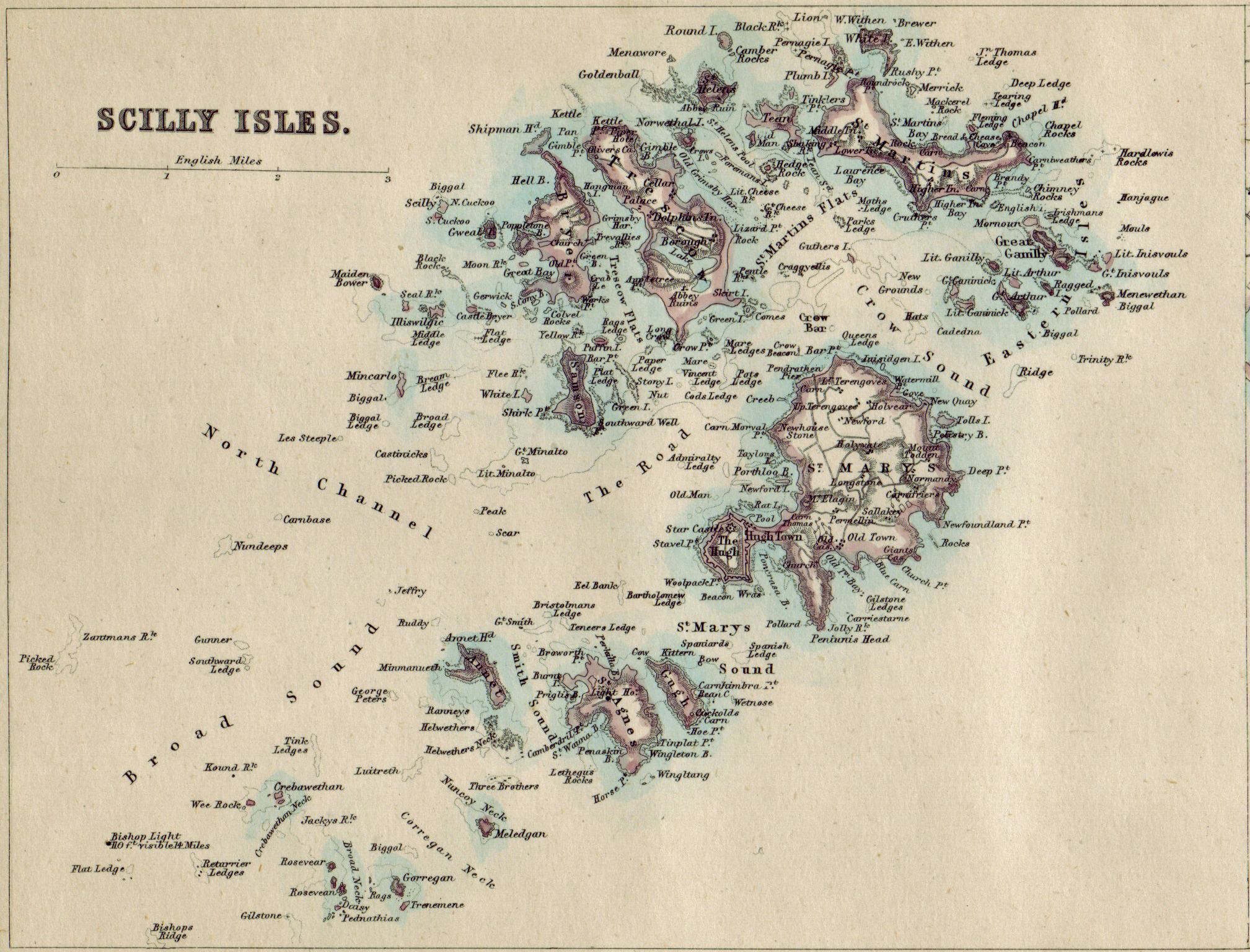
Scilly Isles: map by John Bartholomew

- For ships wrecked both before and after the 19th century see List of shipwrecks of the Isles of Scilly.
- For ships wrecked on the Seven Stones Reef see List of shipwrecks of the Seven Stones Reef.

== 1801–1810 ==
=== 1801 ===
- January — Thomas and William (United Kingdom) was wrecked in the islands while on a voyage from Neath, Glamorgan, to Falmouth, Cornwall.
- January — Melantho (United Kingdom) was wrecked in the islands while on a voyage from London to Tortola, Virgin Islands.
- 5 November — London brig Esperance (United Kingdom) struck Nut Rock and was a total loss, after parting her cables during a south-west gale. She was bound for Venice from Penzance with pilchards.

=== 1804 ===
- 30 May — Quicksilver wrecked in Crow Sound while carrying salt for Newfoundland.
- July — while bound for London from Waterford The Exchange (United Kingdom) foundered west of Scilly.
- 5 November — London brig Esperance (United Kingdom) struck Nut Rock, and was a total loss, after parting her cables during a south-west gale. She was bound for Venice from Penzance with pilchards.

=== 1806 ===
- 10 January — the Governor Milne (United Kingdom) while on passage from Grenada to London went ashore on Tresco in New Grimsby harbour. She was later saved.
- 4 November — prize vessel St Francis Apollo went aground and refloated in New Grimsby harbour.

=== 1807 ===
- 22 November – The Anne, and Tamer, two brigs belonging to Mr. Bayley, merchant of Plymouth, just arrived from Lisbon in ballast, and chartered on account of the Government for Cork, to take in provisions for the Plymouth Victualling Office. Sailed from Cork on Saturday 21 November and wrecked in Tresco, Scilly on Sunday.

=== 1808 ===
- 28 November — schooner Summer ran ashore.

=== 1809 ===
- The Ranter, Thomas, from Cork to Falmouth and Plymouth, struck a rock in Scilly and sank in 20 fathoms of water. It was later raised and the cargo landed.
- 23 November. The Nymph, of and for Pool, William Turner master, from Newfoundland with codfish, was lost on Samson.

=== 1810 ===
- 27 January — Perseus wrecked on Samson while en route from Martinique to London with a cargo of sugar, which was salvaged and sold on St Mary's.
- 31 August — Amelia (United Kingdom) wrecked on Crebawethan while carrying coffee, cotton, rum, sugar and silver dollars from Demerara to London.
- November — 69 ton sloop Harriet & John came ashore.

== 1811–1820 ==
=== 1812 ===
- 26 January — galliot Maria (France) went ashore at an unknown location and refloated on 14 March.
- November — ketch Dublin bound for Londonderry from London holed after hitting a ledge while leaving Scilly. The captain refused the offer of a pilot on board.

=== 1815 ===
- 27 January — West Indiaman, Queen Charlotte (United Kingdom) struck the Scilly Rock while bound for Jamaica from Greenock. One crew member and three passengers died as did two Bryher pilots. The thirteen remaining crew and passengers survived after being stranded on the rock for two days and nights.
- 29 October — the Thais (United Kingdom) of Penzance came ashore.

=== 1818 ===
- 5 January — an unidentified cutter was wrecked offshore.

=== 1819 ===
- 20 March — Fishguard sloop Mary (United Kingdom) wrecked on the Western Rocks while carrying oats from Youghall to Southampton.
- 21 November — Mary wrecked at an unknown location within the Isles of Scilly.

== 1821–1830 ==
=== 1821 ===
- 2 October — a brig Providencia (Spain) wrecked on Hellweathers in thick fog. She was heading for Bristol from St Andero with wool when caught by a north-west gale.
- 3 October — Bryher boat Hero with 21 men aboard was smashed to pieces by heavy seas while removing the cargo from the Providencia.
- the St Martin's Preventive Service boat capsized with the loss of the four men on board.

=== 1822 ===
- 4 February — schooner York (United Kingdom) of Chichester carrying oranges from Seville to London was lost, in thick fog, with all hands within half-a-mile (0.8 km) of St Agnes.

=== 1825 ===
- 10 September — schooner La Sidonia went aground and later refloated in New Grimsby Harbour, Tresco.

=== 1826 ===
- 29 January — brig John & Ann wrecked on Tresco.
- 7 September — Fair Ellen went ashore and was saved.

=== 1827 ===
- 9 September — galliot Twende Sodskende (Netherlands), Bilbao to Copenhagen, hit the Seven Stones Reef and sank two miles (3.2 km) off Bryher.

=== 1829 ===
- 4 January — Ocean on Rosevear Ledges.

=== 1830 ===
- 19 January — the brig Hope with a cargo of peppers, ivory, gold dust and palm oil, dropped anchor and was driven onto the rocks off the north coast of St Martin's after mistaking the daymark for St Agnes lighthouse. The cargo of gold dust and 300 elephant tusks were saved but four people lost their lives when the boat they were trying to escape in was hit by the mainmast.

== 1831–1840 ==
=== 1831 ===
- early January — two Scillonian gigs wrecked.
- 27 March — the Delf went onto rocks in Old Grimsby Harbour.
- 27 March — Swift en route from Liverpool to Rotterdam grounded on St Helens but managed to get away on the next tide.

=== 1833 ===
- January — the St Martin's pilot boat sank in heavy seas with the loss of all ten men.
- 13 February — sixth-rate HMS Forester (Royal Navy) ran aground at Cruther's Point, St Martin during a ″...great gale raged over the UK″. She was later refloated.
- 13 February — bound for Bombay, the Providence struck a rock and was scuttled two days later in Crow Sound. She was floated off on 6 May.

=== 1835 ===
- 29 December — the Malta struck the Black Rock off St Helen's whilst on voyage from Cardiff to Lynmouth. All the crew saved. A scheduled monument.

=== 1836 ===
- 4 February — Fame (United Kingdom) of Exeter carrying pig iron from Newport for Newcastle sank after the loss of her mainmast, boat and bulwarks 6 leagues (29 km) south west of St Agnes. The crew of nine were taken off by twenty men in the St Agnes pilot boats Champion and Cyclop and landed at St Mary's.
- 27 March — cutter Prosperous wrecked at an unknown location.
- 7 April — Maryport brig Bassenthwaite (United Kingdom) sank immediately when she struck a partially submerged wreck in Broad Sound during a north-west gale. This wreck was found and identified in 2017 by Todd Stevens. She is laying in 30m of water south east of the Crim reef.
- April or May — parts of the balks, beams, masts, etc. have been washed up on many of the islands. They may be from a timber ship from Quebec that sank recently; whereabouts and time unknown.
- 13 October — St Ives schooner Minerva (United Kingdom) carrying wool from Spain to Bristol hit the Western Rocks near Crebawathen and sank. Only one member of the crew survived and was picked up from a rock the next morning.
- 12 October — brig Experiment on her maiden voyage from Newfoundland to Poole with fish and oil was found on 14 October drifting after losing her mast and taking on water. Three of the nine crew survived.
- October — the stern of John Dunlap washed onto the shore at Porth Hellick.

=== 1838 ===
- 29 May — barque Osirus (France) hit the Crim Rocks in an easterly gale.
- 27 November — barque Pacquebot de Cayenne (France) sailed into the Hats during a SSE Gale. The crew were saved and most of her cargo of hides, wool and coffee was lost.

=== 1839 ===
- 22 February — 165 ton brig Louisa Hannah wrecked on the Ranneys, half a mile (0.8 km) west of Annet. She was carrying wine and oranges from Lisbon to her home port of Poole. None of the crew survived.
- 27 April — Plymouth schooner Solace en route from Lisbon struck a shallow reef within the Western Rocks during thick fog. The crew managed to save their personal belongings and she went to pieces the following day in a ground swell.
- 4 September — brig Theodorick is probably the earliest recorded wreck on the Bishop Rock. She was carrying a general cargo from Mogodore to London.
- 6 December — the St Vincent hit the Chimney Rocks, at the eastern end of St Martin's and sank. All her crew and 75% of her cargo of barley was salvaged. She was bound for Penzance from Marans.

=== 1840 ===
- 2 February — brig Lady Louise carrying coffee, from Rio de Janeiro to Cowes and London, attempted to make anchorage while in distress, and in a gale she was driven onto Guthers Bar.
- 17 March — Beaumaris brig Jane Ellen (United Kingdom) struck a rock in St Helen's Gap, lost her rudder and went aground on rocks near St Helen's. She was en route to London from Bangor with slate. All the crew were saved.
- 16 November — the Dunkirk brig Nerina (France) capsized in a gale. Two days later, the vessel was taken in tow by two pilot-cutters, but was cut free near the Islands due to the heavy weather. Nerina was seen ″bottom up″ in Porth Hellick, the following day, and three men and a boy were discovered inside alive. Four crew died.
- 29 December — Dartmouth schooner Providence (United Kingdom) hit the Bartholomew Ledges and was run ashore on St Agnes.

== 1841–1850 ==
=== 1841 ===
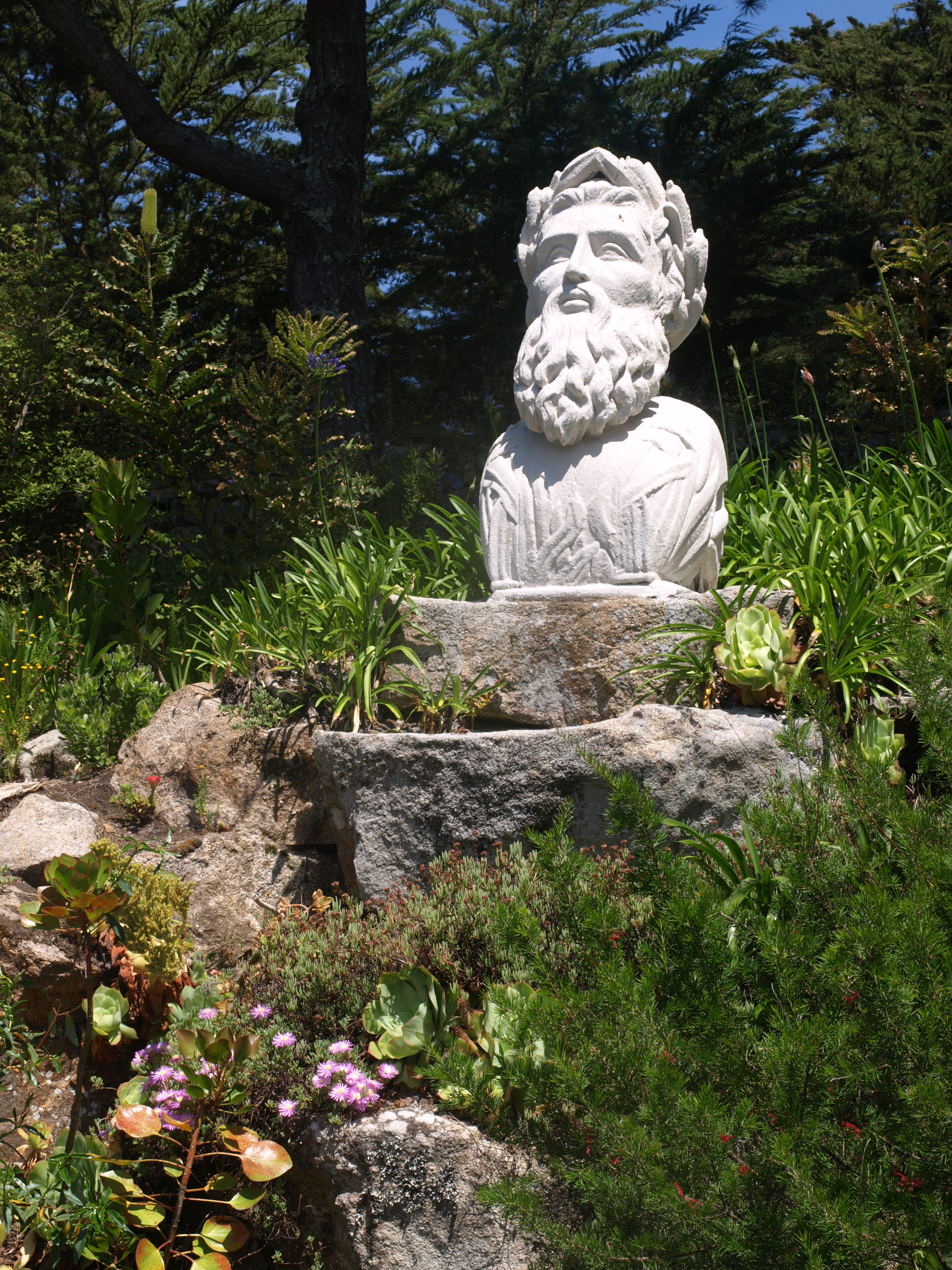
Figurehead of the Thames in Tresco Abbey Gardens

- 4 January — a paddle steamer, the Dublin steam packet SS Thames (United Kingdom), en route from Dublin to London sank in a strong NE gale off Jacky's Rock between Rosevear and Crebawethan. Sixty-two of the sixty-four passengers and crew drowned when her Captain, James Grey, mistook the St Agnes light for the Longships and changed course to head north. Pilot gig Whalemanaged to reach the wreck, saving three women. Her figurehead is in the Valhalla Museum at Tresco Abbey Gardens.
- 2 April — an unidentified schooner was lost on St Agnes.
- December — the pilot boat of St Martin's sank and all six crew escaped with their lives.

=== 1842 ===
- 11 February — brig William Proben (United Kingdom) of South Shields with a cargo of wheat was lost on Meledgan with the loss of all her crew.
- 12 October — the 600-tonne paddle steamer Brigand, a packet boat, en route from Liverpool to St Petersburg, struck the Bishop's Rock with such force that it stove in two large bow plates. The rocks then acted as a pivot, and she swung round and heeled into the rock portside, crushing the paddle-wheel and box to such an extent that it penetrated the engine room. She drifted over seven miles (11 km) in two hours, before sinking in 90 m (300 ft). All the crew were saved.

=== 1843 ===
- 28 January — The English wooden schooner Douro wrecked on Crebawethan with the loss of all her crew while out from Liverpool for Oporto with a cargo of bailed goods, armoury and brass stops (later determined in the 1970s to be horseshoe shaped manillas or bracelets used as tokens in the slave trade). All her crew was lost and five seamen including the master are buried in St Mary's churchyard.
- 3 March — schooner Anne & Jane hit a rock north of St Agnes while carrying slates from her home port of Caernarvon to Perth. Local pilots received £30 for helping her to safety.
- 21 November — schooner Challenger (United Kingdom) from Surinam (or Smyrna according to Noall), carrying fruit to her home port of London and wrecked either on the Gunners or the Nundeeps. Her crew of eight managed to row to Bryher with only one oar and the whole island was put under quarantine.
- 21 November — barque Nickerie (Netherlands) struck a rock, during the night, south-west of Rosevear. She was heading for her home port of Rotterdam from Samarang, Batavia, with coffee and sugar; her captain thought she was in the English Channel. She got off and struck again ten minutes later, and started to break up with eight men drowning. The eleven remaining men attempted to make a raft but only two survived when finally rescued from Rosevear. (According to Noall (1968) this wreck occurred on 22 February 1844).

=== 1844 ===
- 22 February — 600 ton barque Nickerie (or Nichiril) (Netherlands) wrecked on Rosevean while on a voyage from Batavia to Rotterdam with coffee and sugar. There were two survivors. (According to Larn (1992) this wreck occurred on 21 November 1843).
- 1 May — Vespa lost on the Woolpack, Garrison, St Mary's. Vesper lost in St Mary's Sound.

=== 1845 ===
- 1 December — the 347 ton barque registered in North Shields John Esdaile (United Kingdom) struck the Gilstone Ledge in the Western Rocks while out of Green Island for London. She was towed into Smith Sound and a week later went to pieces. Her crew was saved and some of her cargo washed up on Annet and St Agnes.

=== 1846 ===
- 4 January — brig Leonie hit the Bow, off Gugh and was refloated when her masts were cut off to lighten her. She was carrying brandy for Liverpool and the Clyde.
- 3 October — tender Eddystone (United Kingdom) driven onto Men-a-Vaur whilst leaving Old Grimsby Harbour; her cargo was saved. A scheduled monument
- 7 October — brigantine Don (United Kingdom) of Sunderland grounded on Tresco and refloated.

=== 1848 ===
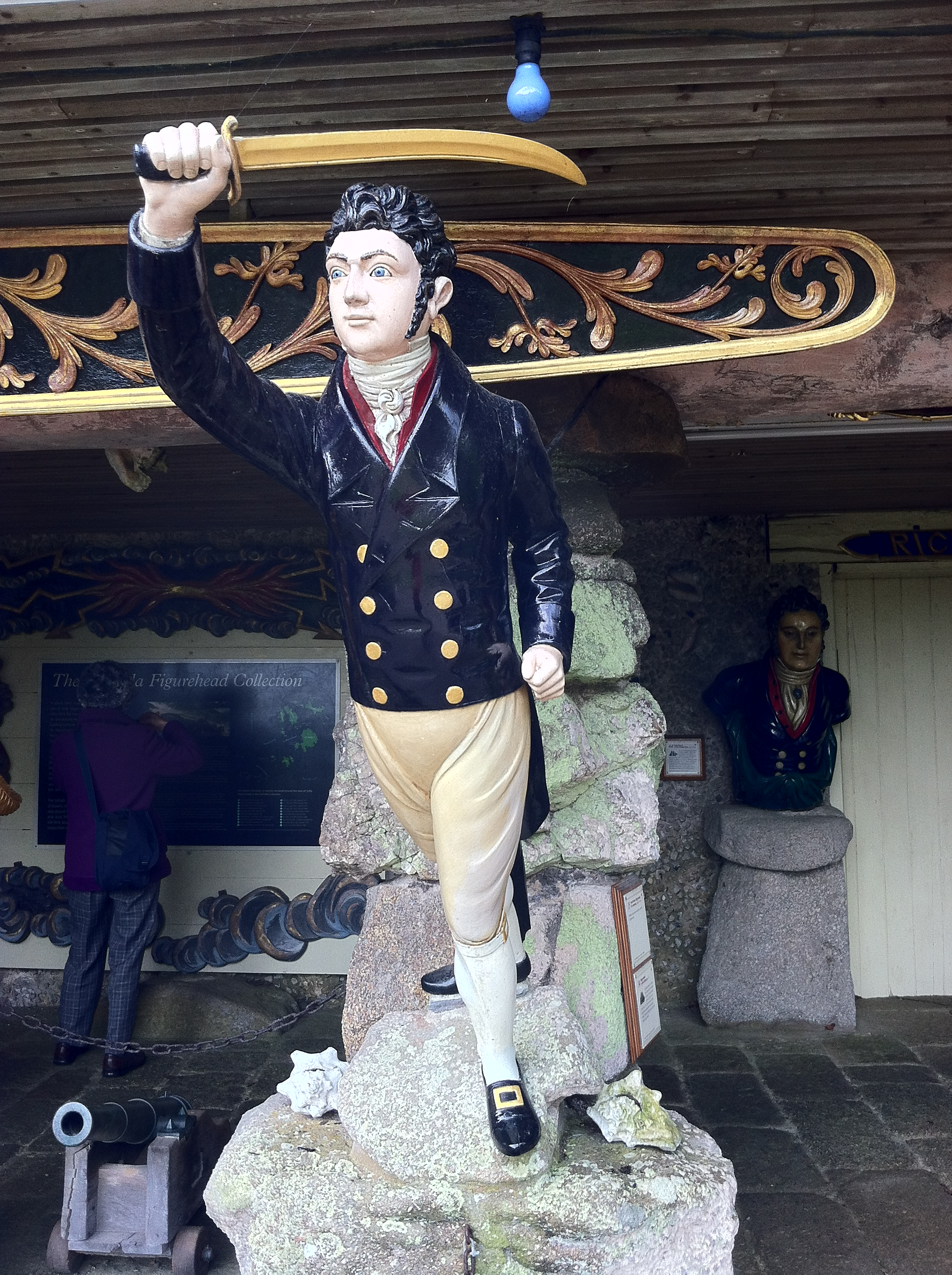
Figurehead of the Palinurus in Tresco Abbey Gardens

- 18 January — Glasgow schooner Eagle (United Kingdom), out of her home port for Charante with coal and iron, hit the Crim, then several other rocks and lastly the Bishop before sinking. The crew had a lucky escaped, with the mainyard narrowly missing the longboat as she was launched.
- 25 December — the brig Charlotte (Sweden) out of Gothenburg for Montevideo with deals and balk timber foundered on Melledgan where the master, mate, two crew and a passenger lost their lives. Ten survivors erected a rough tent on the rock and were rescued the next day.
- 27 December — seventeen lives were lost when the Palinurus with a cargo including hogsheads of rum was wrecked off White Island, Isles of Scilly.

=== 1850 ===
- 30 October — in order to save the brig Calliope (Kingdom of Greece) after she hit the Barthomew Ledges, she was put ashore near the Woolpack Battery, St Mary's. She was heading for Falmouth from Odesa and was sold for £22 10s.

== 1851–1860 ==
=== 1851 ===
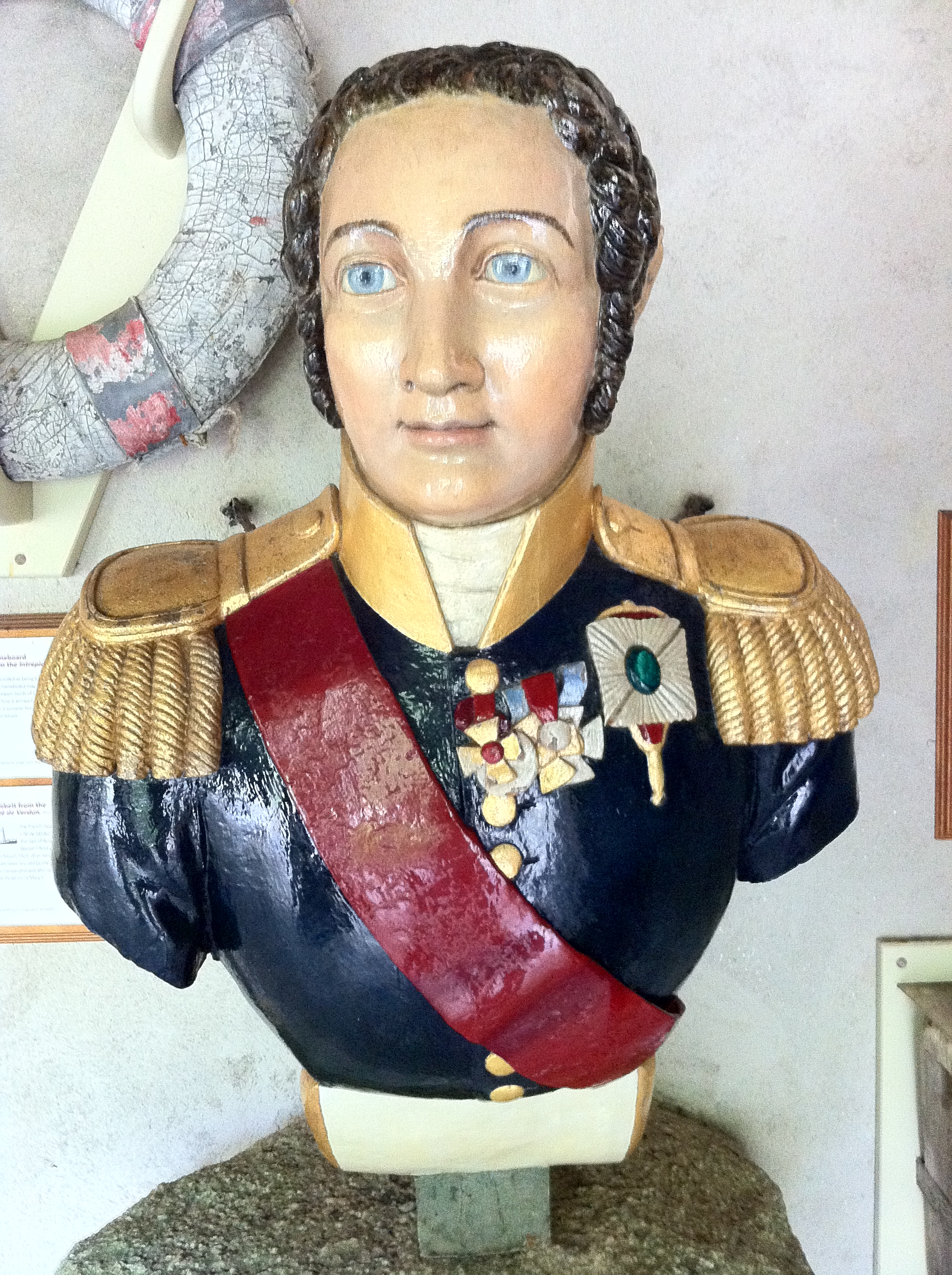
Figurehead of the Alessandro Il Grande in Tresco Abbey Gardens

- 1 January — 289 ton Neapolitan brig Alessandro II Grande (Kingdom of the Two Sicilies) parted her cables and drifted on to Mare Ledges, to the south of Tresco. There was no loss of life. Her figurehead is in the Tresco Abbey Gardens.
- 14 September — storm damaged brig San Giorgio (Neopolitan) drifted onto the Crim Rocks, then cleared and partially sank on her side with her crew rescued by the schooner Galway. San Giorgio drifted out to sea and was found 60 miles (97 km) offshore. She was towed back to Scilly by a schooner and fifteen pilot-cutters with all her cargo of olive oil and wood salvaged. She was repaired on St Mary's and renamed the Lion of Scilly.

=== 1852 ===
- 13 April — 225 ton barque Mary Hay hit the Steeple Rock on Bream Ledges while entering Broad Sound despite there being a pilot on board. She was on passage from Jamaica to London with a mixed cargo and sank suddenly with thirty men on deck. There was no loss of life and the wreck was sold for £72 along with salvaged ebony, logwood, coconuts and fustic. The day after the wreck 43 puncheons of rum, two casks of lime-juice, 1,170 bags of pimento, and ship stores, gear and clothing were salvaged Her figurehead is in Valhalla on Tresco.
- a wooden box from East Indiaman Agnes Ewing British East India Company was washed ashore on Teän. She was on passage from Liverpool to Calcutta and nothing more has been heard of the ship.

=== 1853 ===
- 27 January — Brixham schooner Sarah (United Kingdom) sank at anchor in St Martin's Flats; she had sprung a leak two days previous while bound with coal from Cardiff to Tenerife and Santa Cruz. Her cargo and hull was sold three weeks later for £38.
- 3 March — while carrying slate from her home port of Caernarfon to Perth the schooner Anne & Jane (United Kingdom) hit a rock north of St Agnes.
- 24 March — cargo ship Sultana ( Hamburg) was lost on the Nundeeps and her crew drowned. A nameboard was washed ashore near Padstow nearly a month later.
- 12 June — brig Ambassador ( Malta) carrying coal from Cardiff to Malta struck the Seven Stones in fine weather at six in the morning and sank. The crew made it into the ship boats and made for the Trinity House light vessel.

=== 1854 ===
- 3 January — brig Advena driven onto Samson in a south-east gale. She was re-floated at high water after her masts were removed.
- 26 June — the Cardiff cutter Belinda (United Kingdom) sailing from her home port to Cork with limestone, hit the Bishop Rock in thick fog. She got off the rock but took in water and foundered nearby; her crew were saved.

=== 1856 ===
- 28 August — Liverpool full-rigger Custos (United Kingdom) sank within ten minutes after hitting the Crim Rocks. She was carrying brandy, rum, gunpowder and soap, most of which was lost. She was also carrying Manillas, Muskets, and Barrels of Musket flints as stated in an auction of her cargo on St Marys Island, reported in the-West Briton Newspaper 19/9/1856. These remains can be found around Round Rock currently misidentified as the Douro.
- Chieftain said to be wrecked on the east side of St Martin's at Hard Lewis. The figurehead of a highland chieftain in full dress is in Valhalla on Tresco, although there is no record of a ship named Chieftain in Lloyd's Register, HM Customs and Excise, Board of Trade or the RNLI at this time. The wreck in deep water by Hard Lewis is most probably Gilmore, wrecked in 1866. Along with the Chieftan And the Gilmore, Mr Larn, has also publicised this wreck as being the Juno. However the best candidate by far for this wreck is the 'Joseph and Betsey' an Admiralty Brig. The evidence for this being the case can be found in the Admiralty Secretary, Reports of a Court Martial in February 1771 found in the Public Records Office at Kew.

=== 1857 ===
1 June — the Padstow brig Voluna (United Kingdom) while in ballast from Falmouth for Quebec went ashore on the south shore of St Agnes during dense fog. The crew managed to get ashore and Voluna broke up in the surf.

=== 1860 ===
- 14 July — Austrian sailing ship Osvetitel was wrecked in fog on Maiden Bower while sailing from Ibrail to Falmouth with barley. Her crew and most of her cargo was recovered.
- 19 August — brig Aurora went ashore, in fog, on the Brow-of-Ponds while carrying wheat from Ibrail to Falmouth. Her crew survived but the cargo was lost and the wreck was sold 23 August.
- 26 November — the Empire (United Kingdom) sank during a severe gale in North Sound after hitting Peaked Rock.

== 1861–1870 ==
=== 1861 ===
- 18 February — schooner Pauline (France) carrying railway iron from Ardrossan to Rouen was driven onto Crow Bar
- 18 February — the Mentor ( (United Kingdom of Great Britain and Ireland) Jersey) parted her cables and collided with the brig Arthemise (France). The crew managed to get on board the Arthemise which was then run ashore.
- 19 March — 846 ton sailing ship Award (United Kingdom) on her second voyage and bound from Liverpool for New Orleans, struck rocks 1.5 miles (2.4 km) off Gweal. NNW force 8 to 9 winds drove her on to the northern end of Gweal pushing her bow on to land and forming a temporary bridge to the island. After twelve hours the crew of 24 managed to scramble ashore.

=== 1862 ===
- 24 February — brig Alexandrina (United Kingdom) of Cardiff while carrying coal was abandoned during a gale in the roadstead. Scillonian pilots received £97 from the owner for running her aground.

=== 1863 ===
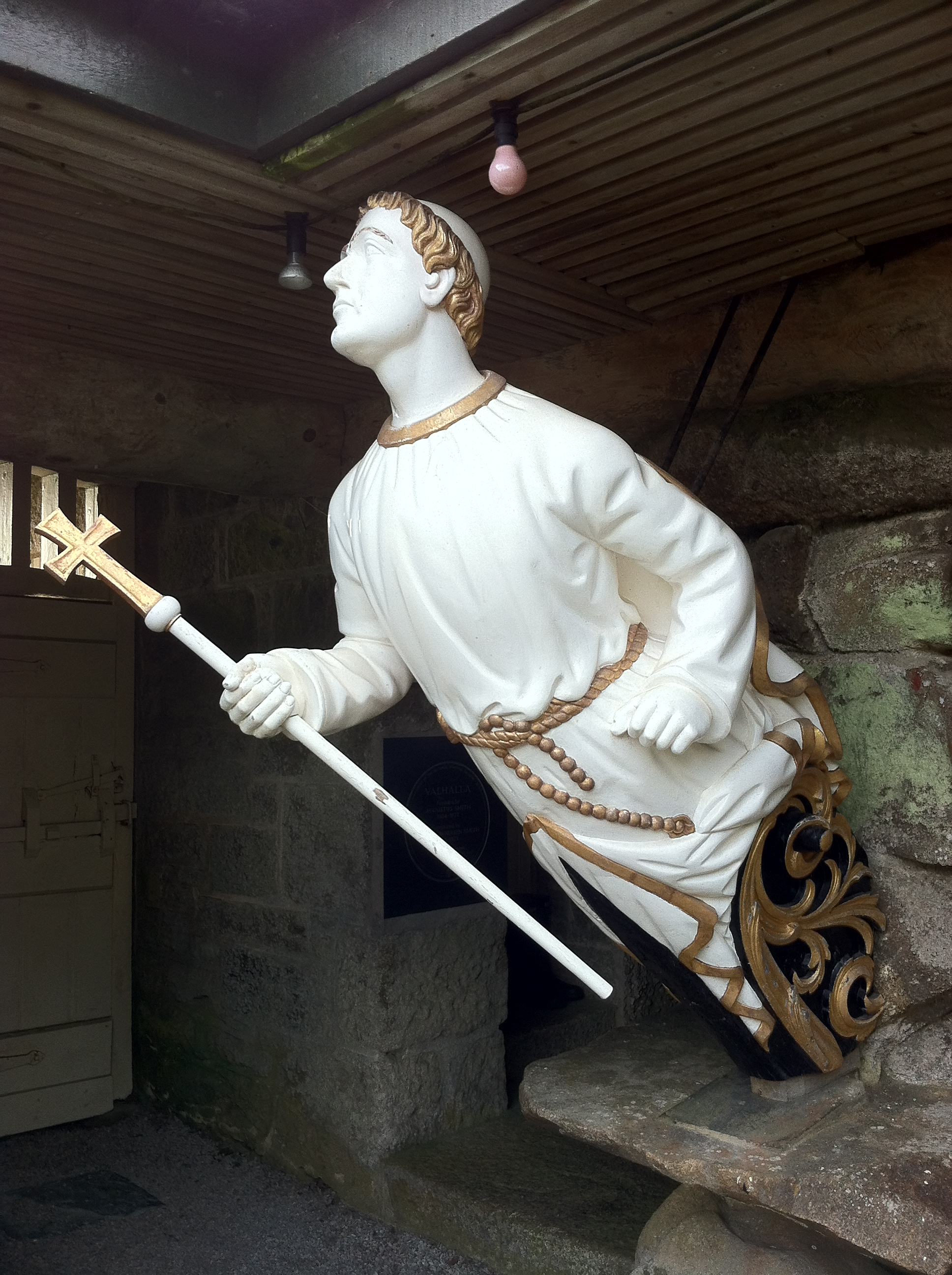
Figurehead of the Friar Tuck in Tresco Abbey Gardens

- December — sailing ship Friar Tuck with a cargo of tea wrecked in a north-west gale on Porth Loo, St Mary's. The crew were landed by the rocket apparatus.

=== 1864 ===
- 1 May — while en route from Malaga to St Petersburg with olive oil the Aegir Sweden of Gelf was wrecked but re-floated on the same day.

=== 1866 ===
- 6 February — barque Hydra wrecked.
- 13 February — schooner Dauphine (France) caught alight two hours from Scilly and her hulk eventually drifted onto St Agnes.
- 12 April — 535 ton barque Gilmore (United Kingdom) of Southampton wrecked on Hard Lewis, off the east side of St Martin's. She was in ballast from her home port to Quebec and the crew managed to get away in the ship's boats. What little is left of her remains lie in shallow water on top of the Hard Lewis reef.

=== 1867 ===
- 19 January – Paddle steamer Vesper of Glasgow, built in 1865, gave way amidships about 50 miles off the Isles of Scilly.
- December — brigantine Good Intent with a cargo of coal hit the Crim Rocks and sank.
- coal hulk Eliza wrecked. Her figurehead is in the Tresco Abbey Gardens.

=== 1869 ===
- 16 February — Schooner Alida (Netherlands) of Veendam sank off White Island, St Martin's en route from Swansea to Taragonna with patent fuel. her crew were pricked up by the pilot gig Linnet.
- 6 December — Brigantine Otto (Sweden) stranded on Southward Well, after parting her cables and fouling the barque Dorothy Thompson. She was carrying Stockholm tar from Jakobstad to Bristol. There was no loss of life and only 36 barrels were saved before she broke up.

=== 1870 ===
- 27 January — Ship Willem Poolman (Netherlands) of Rotterdam went on the rocks at Southward Well while en route from Batavia to her home port. Both the ship and her cargo of tin and coffee were saved.
- 20 April — screw steamer Sado (United Kingdom) was lost on the Brow of the Ponds between Crebawthan and Jackyl Rock while heading to Liverpool from Oporto with a general cargo including wood, wine, oranges, thirty head of cattle and eggs. ″Some of the eggs hatched, the breed of fowl proved unsatisfactory and eventually died″. Three of the bullocks were found by a Sennen boat and landed on Roseveor and a fourth was landed on St Mary's.
- 28 May — schooner Frances Jane (United Kingdom) of Carrickfergus hit the Bartholomew Ledges (and refloated) while carrying salt from Runcorn to Plymouth.
- 21 July — while bound for Marseille from Cardiff, the Liverpool steamer Tyne Queen (United Kingdom) struck Men-a-Vaur in fog, was stranded on rocks in St Helen's Pool for an hour before unloading her cargo in New Grimsby.
- 7 October — despite the good visibility during daylight hours and the lightship within sight, the barque Nelson (United Kingdom) struck the Seven Stones reef while carrying pig lead and esparto to Tyneside. She sank within two minutes and the master and two of the crew lost their lives.

== 1871–1880 ==
=== 1871 ===
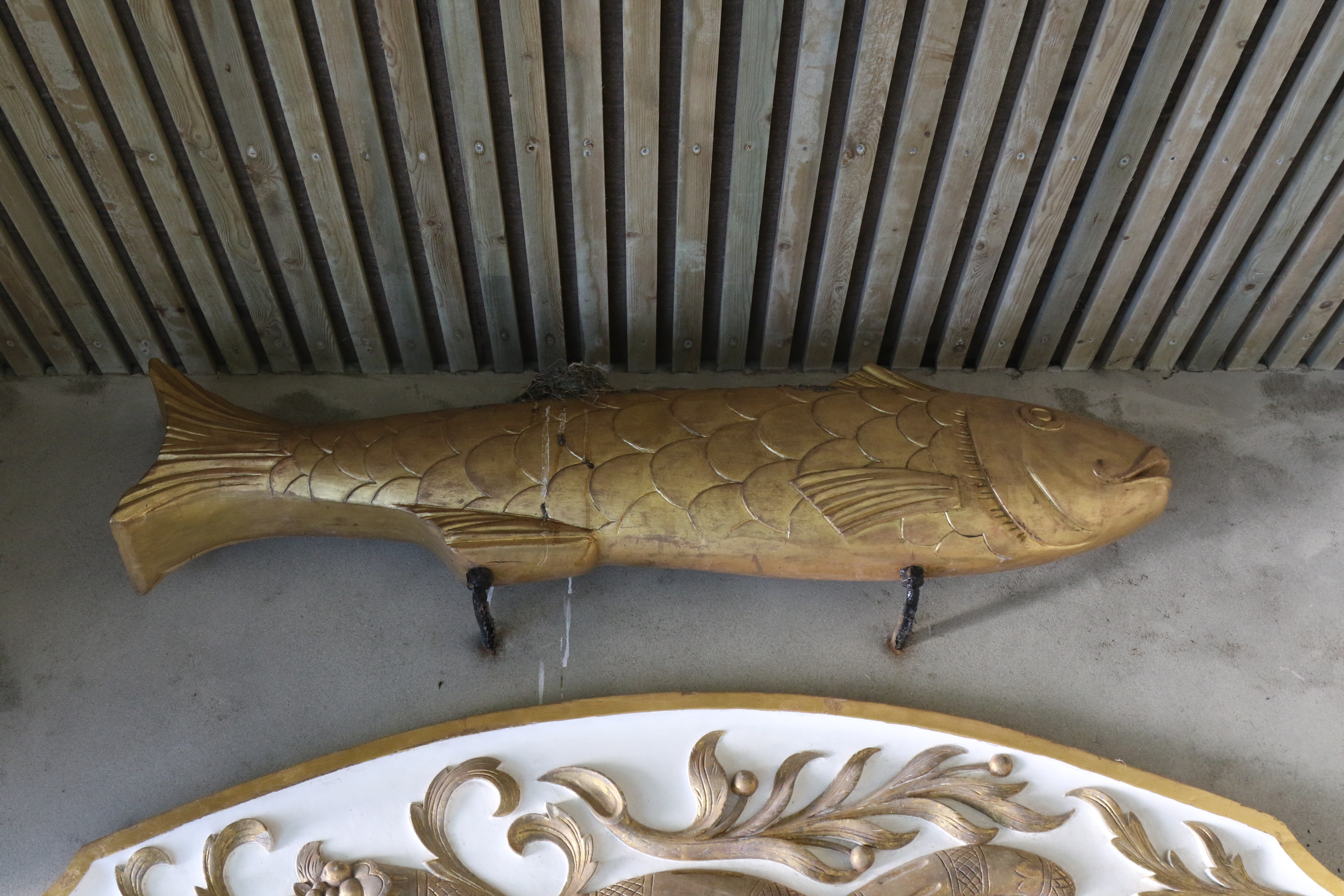
Figurehead from the Salmon in Tresco Abbey Gardens

- 11 January — Kinsale barque Royal Standard (United Kingdom) carrying oats from her home port to Southampton was driven ashore on Bryher. She was refloated four days later.
- 15 January – barque Salmon (United Kingdom) drifted onto rocks on Tresco.
- 24 June — iron barque Il Primo (Spain) of Bilbao carrying sugar for Greenock from Havana hit the Seven Stones reef and quickly sank with the loss of all the crew bar one.
- 7 July — the 387 ton barque Belle of the South hit the Perconger Ledge off St Agnes in a heavy rain squall. With a pilot on board she ran for and beached near St Mary's pier where a piece of rock two foot long was found embedded in her hull. She was repaired and continued her journey to Algoa Bay, South Africa with a general cargo.
- 13 October — schooner Lelia (France) carrying coal from Neath to Rochelle went aground on the Spanish Ledges but managed to get clear.
- 20 December — all but two of the crew of the Liverpool steamer Delaware (United Kingdom) drowned when she broke down and was driven ashore on Mincarlo. Two of the crew escaped in the ships boat which was washed up on White Island (Sampson) and saved by the crew of Byrher gig Albion (United Kingdom).

=== 1872 ===
- 17 February — Greek brig Telxinoi wrecked on Crow Bar.
- 16 July — PS Earl of Arran (United Kingdom) passenger steamer, which travelled between the islands and Penzance struck the rock St Martin's Neck and beached on Nornour after a passenger, Stephen Woodcock, a pilot-boat crew member though himself not a pilot, talked the Captain into taking an unusual course ″... to give the passengers a better view″. The 92 passengers and crew were saved though the Earl was beyond help.
- 6 October — Little Western (United Kingdom) wrecked on the Wells Reef. She was the second West Cornwall Steam Ship Company ferry to be wrecked in the islands during 1872.
- 22 November — Italian barque Rosa Tacchini wrecked on the Paper Ledges, near Tresco after her anchors dragged during a severe south-west gale. No one was hurt. The wreck was towed to Carn Near on Tresco where she was broken up.

=== 1873 ===
- 1 February — while sheltering from hurricane-force winds along with fifty other ships the Outalpha (United Kingdom) of London grounded in St Mary's Roads. She was refloated on the following tide and continued her journey from Adelaide to London with grain.
- 15 March — all the crew were lost when the Elizabeth was wrecked on St Agnes.
- 10 June — Mousehole sailing lugger Cornish Girl (United Kingdom) sank after striking the Round Rock in the Spanish Ledges in fine weather. No lives lost.

=== 1874 ===
- 18 January — the Minnehaha, cargo ship, bound for Dublin, wrecked on Peninnis Head, St Mary's with the loss of ten lives including the Pilot.
- 10 March — schooner Ranneys (United Kingdom) of Fowey struck the Spanish Ledges and refloated.
- 22 March — the upturned hull of the sailing ship James Armstrong, with a cargo of mahogany and coconuts, was found between St Martin's and the Seven Stones and towed to St Mary's beach by the Queen of the Bay. The coconuts were inedible!
- 4 April — SS Bordelaise (United Kingdom) of Liverpool attempted to enter Crow Sound without a Pilot and hit the Hats. She was bound for Oporto, from Newport, with coal and railway iron. Some of her cargo was salvaged.
- 13 April — schooner Edmund wrecked.
- 16 April — SS Zelda, on her maiden voyage, stranded on the Maiden Bower Rock in fog. Her crew and passengers were saved, and some cargo was salvaged by divers. When the wreck was inspected in 1966, it was found that not only had the SS Brinkburn sunk on top of the Zelda in 1898, but that evidence of an unknown wooden warship was found beneath it.
- 20 April — St Agnes pilot cutter Gem (United Kingdom) smashed on Perconger after she slipped her moorings.

=== 1875 ===
- 7 May — ocean liner Schiller (German Empire) on a journey from New York City to Hamburg, wrecked on the Retarrier Ledges with the loss of 335 people.
- 11 August — barque Cactus (Kingdom of Italy) on passage from Tripoli to Cardiff with esparto grass struck the Northern Rocks. With pilots on board, she was deliberately run onto Samson the next day and taken to Hugh Town on the 13th.
- 26 August — (Genoa) barque Gloria (Kingdom of Italy) hit the Crim Rocks. Assisted to St Mary's by the Lady of the Isles, her cargo of ore and grass from Pomeron was saved.
- 1 November — on her maiden voyage to Rio de Janeiro with coal, the three–masted brigantine Catherine Griffiths sank in thick fog with the loss of eight of her nine crew. Giovanni Carstulovich managed to reach the shore at Troy Town.
- 2 November — steamer Aksai (Russia) sailed into White Island, St Martin's in thick fog while bound for Odesa from Cardiff with coal. The captain and crew of thirty-nine were saved by the Lady of the Isles. Her remains currently lay south side of the Bakers Rock with her stern in 15meters of water.
- 23 November — 452 ton Foscolo (Kingdom of Italy) of Naples struck the Seven Stone Reef while bound from Montevideo for Dundee with scrap iron and bones. She managed to reach Crow Bar and sank in the shallows. She was later salvaged and raised.

=== 1876 ===
- 17 February — the Linn Fern (United Kingdom) of Glasgow wrecked in Crow Sound
- British barque Bordelaise (United Kingdom) with a cargo of ″railway iron″ lost on The Hats; see 1874 above.

=== 1877 ===
- schooner Ethel (United Kingdom) struck the Seven Stones reef but sustained little damage and headed for Plymouth. Her captain and mate had their certificates withdrawn.

=== 1878 ===
- 23 July — Out of Seville, Ranneys (United Kingdom) ran aground off St Mary's while awaiting orders. After 24 hours she refloated with the loss of her kedge anchor and hawser.
- 10 October — Aberystwyth schooner Integrity (or Integrite) (United Kingdom) lost her foremast and longboat in heavy seas off the Bishop Rock. Carrying lime phosphates from Lisbon to Wicklow she found it impossible to manoeuvre in Smith Sound and drifted around Annet before being beached in Perconger, St Agnes. One of the four crew was swept overboard and drowned. Two days later she was refloated and taken to St Mary's.
- 23 October — Ely Rise (France) carrying ″patent fuel″ struck rocks near The Hats in Crow Sound. She was refloated and repaired and was subject to a salvage claim by the West Cornwall Steam Ship Company.
- 31 December — brigantine Minerve (France) driven onto rocks between Wrass and Morning Point. All the crew, bar one who swam to safety, were saved by the rocket apparatus.

=== 1879 ===
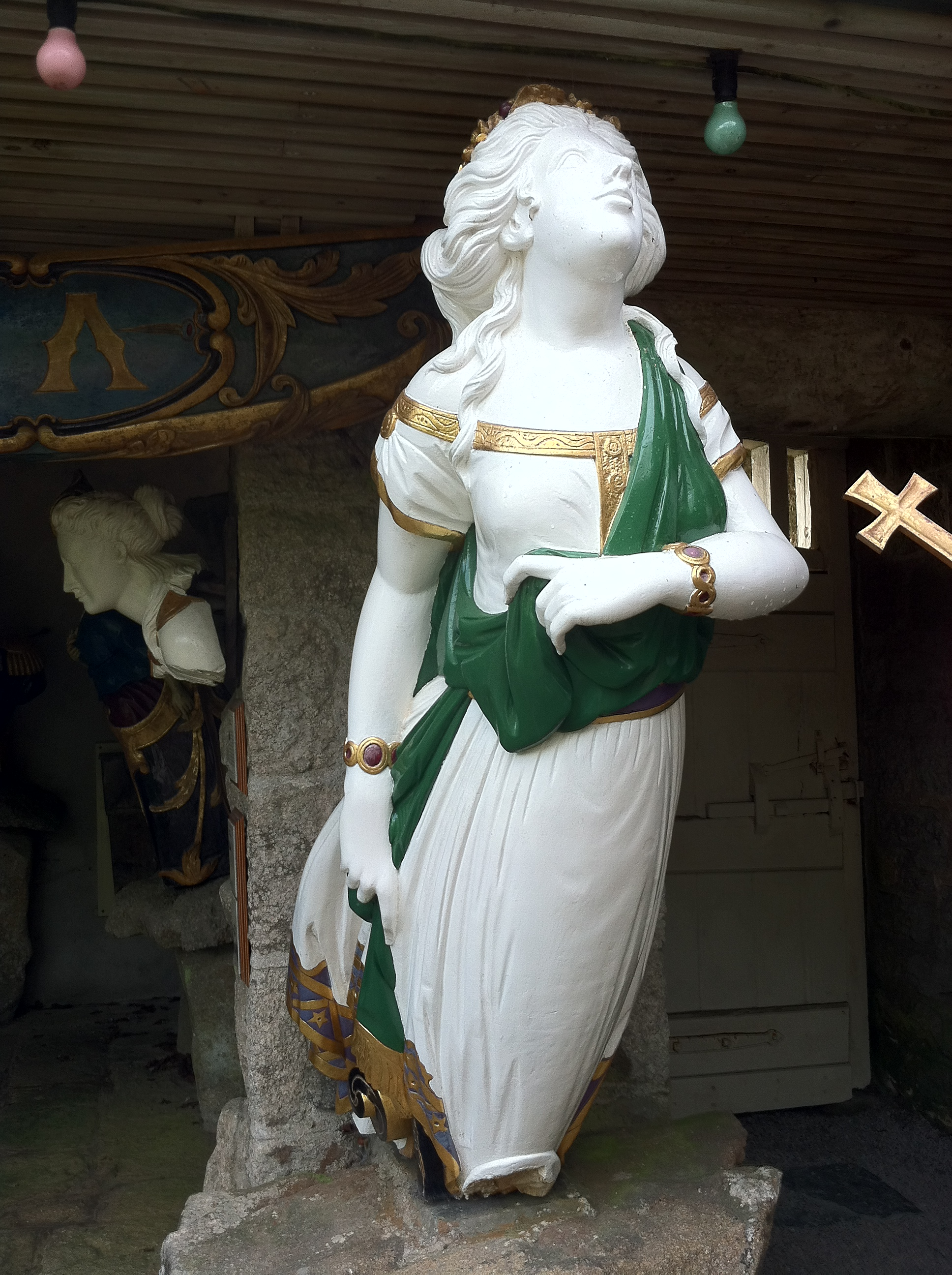
Figurehead of the River Lune in Tresco Abbey Gardens

- January — Liverpool barque Bertha (United Kingdom) was abandoned, off the islands, after a collision with J Brown which headed for Queenstown with the crew of the abandoned ship. Bertha foundered shortly after.
- 6 January — the brigantine Gerhardine was abandoned by her crew approximately 30 miles (48 km) south of St Agnes. She was towed into St Mary's by Gladiator. The crew were landed at Le Havre on 16 January.
- 24 March — on her maiden voyage, the 215 ton barquentine Tabasco, carrying bottled beer and coal from Greenock struck White Island, St Martin's. Her master mistook the Seven Stones lightship for Trevose Head.
- 27 July — Liverpool barque Maipu was wrecked in Hell Bay on Bryher. She was bound for Hamburg from Iquique with a cargo of saltpetre.
- 27 July — barque River Lune in ballast from Lorient to Ardrossan was lost on Brothers Rock in Muncoy Neck, the channel between Annet and Melledgan, after a faulty chronometer put her off course. She sank in ten minutes, but the crew escaped. The wreck was sold on 13 August 1879 for £10 to Messrs Banfield and Son.

=== 1880 ===
- the St Martin's cutter Queen (United Kingdom) grounded on Par Beach, St Martin's and wrecked.
- 23 October – the coal schooner Argo wrecked on Teän while on passage from Newport to Polruan. All the crew of eight managed to get ashore.
- 28 October – the 194 tons gross wooden brig Messenger of Salcombe dragged onto Skirt Island while carrying coal from Cardiff to Portsmouth. She refloated after St. Mary's lifeboat (Henry Dundas) had saved five of her crew but was later scrapped.

== 1881–1890 ==
=== 1881 ===
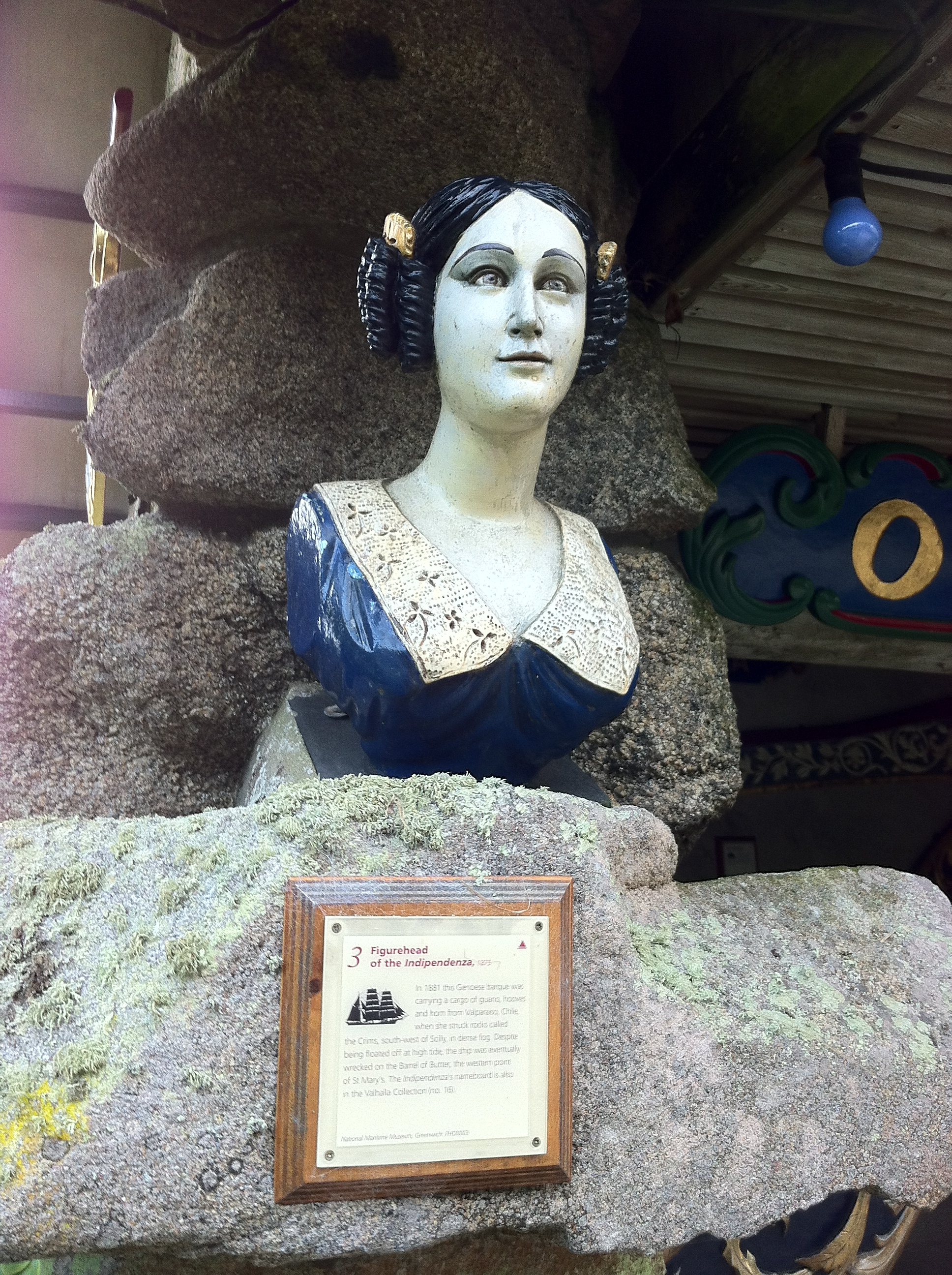
Figurehead of the Independenzia in Tresco Abbey Gardens

- January — the barque Saint Jean (France) sank, with the loss of three men, after colliding with the barque Privateer.
- 18 January — the wooden hulled brigantine Charlotte Dunbar was found ashore and abandoned on Burnt Island, St Agnes. She was sailing from Newport to Audierne with coal and nothing was heard of her crew of six.
- 8 February — the brigantine Kron Prinz von Preussen (German Empire) was driven ashore in New Grimsby harbour, Tresco.
- 7 May — the SS Culmore with a cargo of onions, peppers and oranges hit the Crim. The captain and three of the crew lost their lives.
- 24 September – the barque Independenzia was carrying a cargo of guano and horn from Valparaiso, Chile, when she struck the Crim Rocks and later sank on the Barrel of Butter rock on The Garrison.
- 21 November — the small steamer Gem (United Kingdom) broke from her moorings in St Mary's Pool, and went ashore at William's Bay, becoming a total wreck. Gem taking on coal and was bound for South Africa for employment as a river boat.
- 27 November — the Excelsior (German Empire) of Hamburg grounded on Crow Bar and consequently beached on the south-west corner of Higher Town Bay, St Martin's. She had left Rangoon on 7 June and was carrying 915 tons of rice, rattan and teak. Two months later on 22 January she was towed towards St Mary's by the Queen of the Bay and Lady of the Isles and after 30 minutes sank (see also 1882).

=== 1882 ===
- 22 January — the Excelsior sank off St Martin's after repairs on a St Martin's beach (see 1881).
- 24 April — London barge St Vincent (United Kingdom) sank on Toll Island, near Pelistry, St Mary's after striking the Spanish Ledges. She was en route from St Vincent for London with sugar. The crew escaped, but there was much embarrassment as she was carrying a St Agnes pilot.
- 12 December — the steamer Raglan (United Kingdom) sank, after being hit by a Greek steamer and her boiler exploding. The crew were picked up by the Greek steamer.

=== 1883 ===
- 9 February — Criccieth Castle lost on Porthcress Beach.

=== 1884 ===
- 16 November — the derelict barque Chrystalline (United Kingdom) of Liverpool, was towed to the islands by boats belonging to the islands. She appeared to have been in a recent collision and there was no sign of her boats and crew.

=== 1885 ===
- 8 June — Earl of Lonsdale (United Kingdom) of Newcastle, carrying cotton seed from Alexandria to Portishead, was wrecked in Smith Sound, off the Troy Town maze, St Agnes in thick fog. The master had thought his ship was to the west of, and 10 miles (16 km) south of, the Bishop Rock.
- 17 December — cargo ship SS Sussex struck Seal Rock, near the Maiden Bower after being caught in heavy fog, while travelling at normal cruising speed. The crew escaped and she broke up during the night of 4–5 January in heavy seas.
- 30 December — a local cutter capsized off Yellow Ledges with the loss of one life, while on its way to the steamer Sussex, which struck Seal Rock on 17 December.

=== 1886 ===
- 26 March — Brigantine Nellie(Denmark) of Elsinore had been in collision to the west of Scilly and was driven before a south-westerly gale onto the Western Rocks where she first struck Jackys Rock. Part of the vessel drifted onto Annet and the remainder into St Warna's Cove on St Agnes. She was on passage from Bordeaux to Cardiff with pit props under the command of Capt M L Svendsen who lost his life along his chief officer. Two of the crew were saved after clinging to the wreck for sixteen hours and four were picked up from Melledgan where they quenched their thirst with puffins' blood.
- March — 300 ton unknown vessel was seen bottom up about 6.5 miles (10.5 km) south by east of the Bishop Rock.

=== 1887 ===
- 12 January — Caernarvon schooner Bolina (United Kingdom) carrying slate from Portmadoc to London sank off the south coast of Gugh during an easterly gale.
- 8 June — the SS Castleford struck the Crebawethans and led to some of her cargo of 250 to 450 cattle being landed on Annet and staying there for up to ten days.

=== 1888 ===
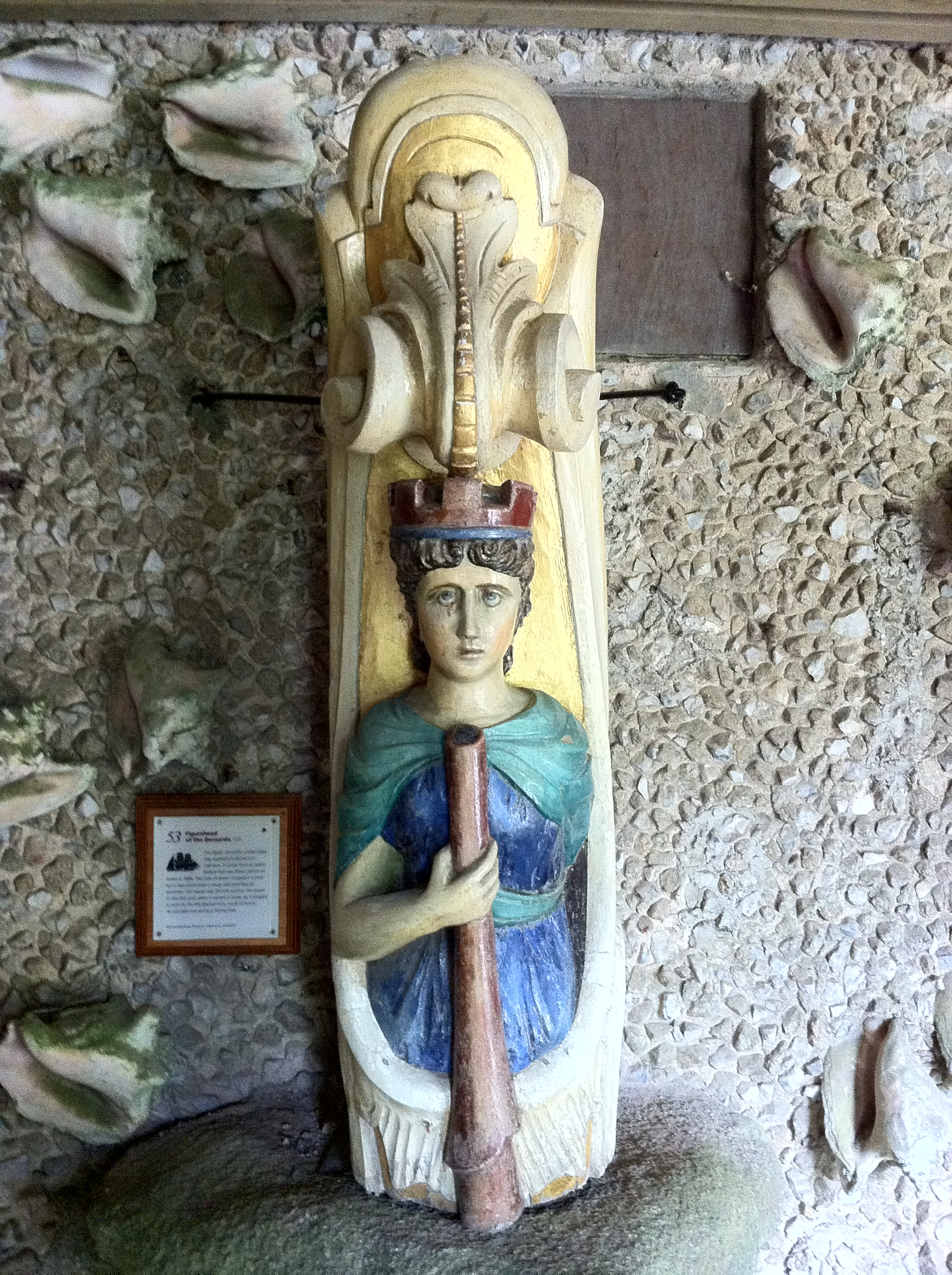
Figurehead of the Bernardo in Tresco Abbey Gardens

- 15 January — the 332 ton barque Gauloise (France) of Bordeaux sailed onto Great Arthur Island on the northern edge of Crow Sound. She was carrying pitprops for Porthcawl and heading NNE when fog came down 14 miles (23 km) south of St Agnes light.
- 16 January — a pilot's cutter sank following a collision with the Newcastle steamer Belmont (United Kingdom). None of the crew survived.
- 11 March — while in ballast, the barque Bernardo (Kingdom of Italy) of Genoa lost her sails in a west-north-west gale and was blown ashore on the back of Annet. The captain was rescued from Old Woman Rock by St Agnes fisherman after the ship broke up around him. Eleven of the crew were drowned in the ship's boat when it capsized. Her figurehead, apparently St Bernard of Clairvaux, is in Valhalla on Tresco.
- 7 May — London steamer Egyptian Monarch (United Kingdom) on passage from New York to her home port with a general cargo including cattle, and passengers, stranded near Bryher. She managed to refloat and made Falmouth the same day with one compartment full of water.
- 9 August — no one on the islands knew that the steamer Gomes V (Portugal) had foundered until a St Martin's pilot boat picked up nineteen crew and one passenger drifting eastwards past Hanjaque in two of the ships boats. She was carrying coal to Oporto from Cardiff and struck the Shag Rock in dense fog.

=== 1889 ===
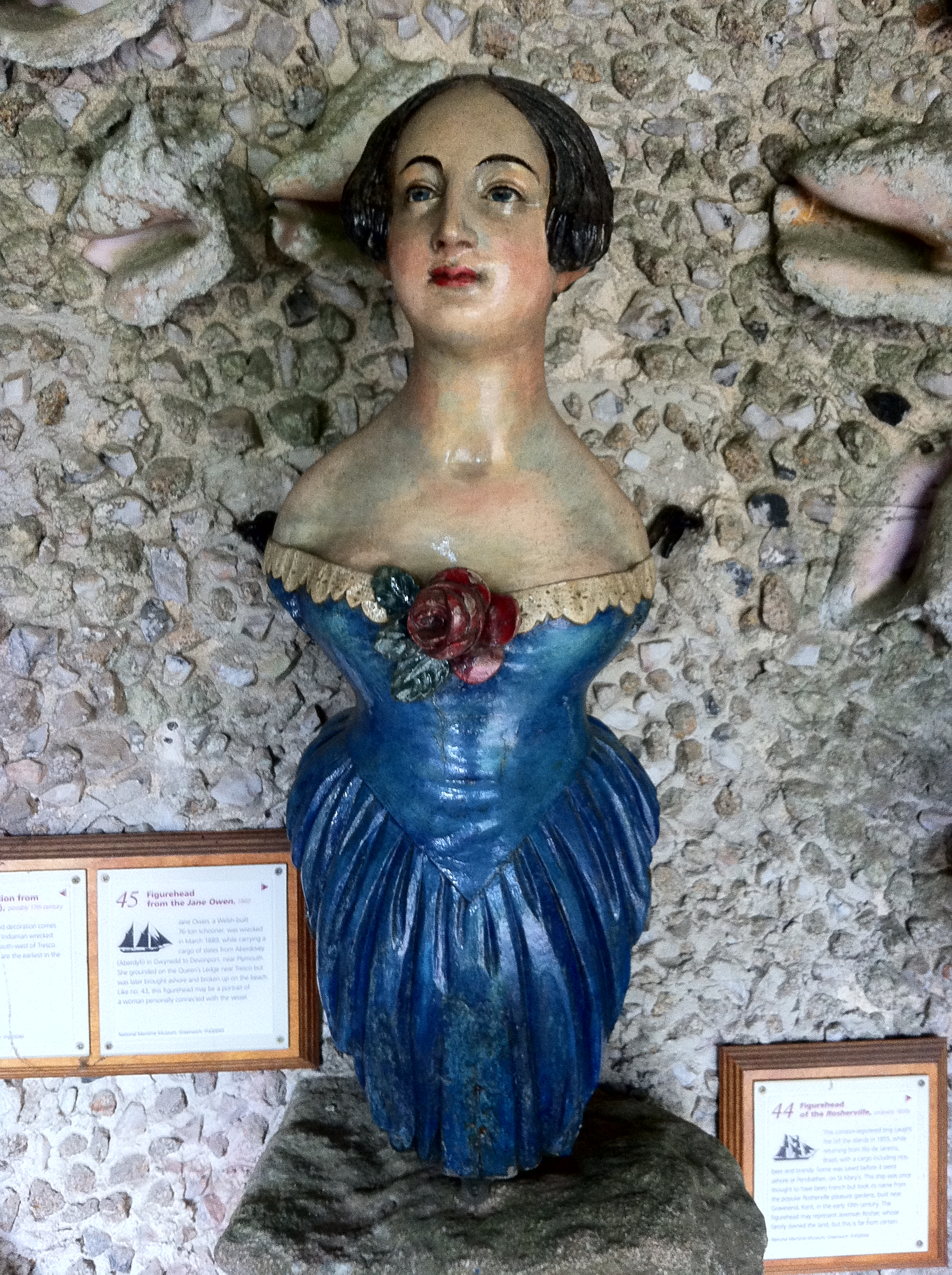
Figurehead of the Jane Owen in Tresco Abbey Gardens

- 3 March — Jane Owen wrecked on Crow Bar.

== 1891–1900 ==
=== 1891 ===
- 19 February — steamer Trignac (France) sprang a leak, blew up and sank within five minutes, between the Islands and the Seven Stones Reef. She was carrying coal from Newport to St Nazaire.
- 9 March — the crew of the schooner Martha (United Kingdom) of Carnarvon, were rescued by the Lyonesse as she began to sink. The schooner was taking slate to London.
- 10 March — 34 ton smack Porth (United Kingdom) of Padstow ran ashore on the Minmanueth Rocks on the western coast of Annet. She was heading for St Columb Minor with culm from Swansea when she was caught in the ″Great Blizzard of 1891″. St Agnes lifeboat James & Caroline rescued the master and his son, but the third crew member was found frozen.
- 12 March — barque Megellan (Netherlands) foundered in the approaches to the English Channel at lat 47.48 N long 6.53 W. The crew were picked up and taken to Falmouth.
- 13 March — the chasse-maree Two Sisters (France) was wrecked off St Mary's. One member of crew drowned.
- 11 November — Padstow schooner J K A (United Kingdom) wrecked on Shag Rocks near the Mouls; she broke free and foundered. Her crew abandoned ship and landed on Great Innisvouls where they were rescued by a gig from St Martin's.

=== 1892 ===
- 6 February — Embiricos of Andros hit either John Thomas or Deep Ledge, St Martin's in heavy rain. She was bound for Malta and Odesa with coal from Cardiff. The captain and five others lost their lives when attempting to launch a boat. Twenty-eight hours four of her crew in a second boat were picked up off the Lizard by steamer Rutland and landed at Le Havre.

=== 1893 ===
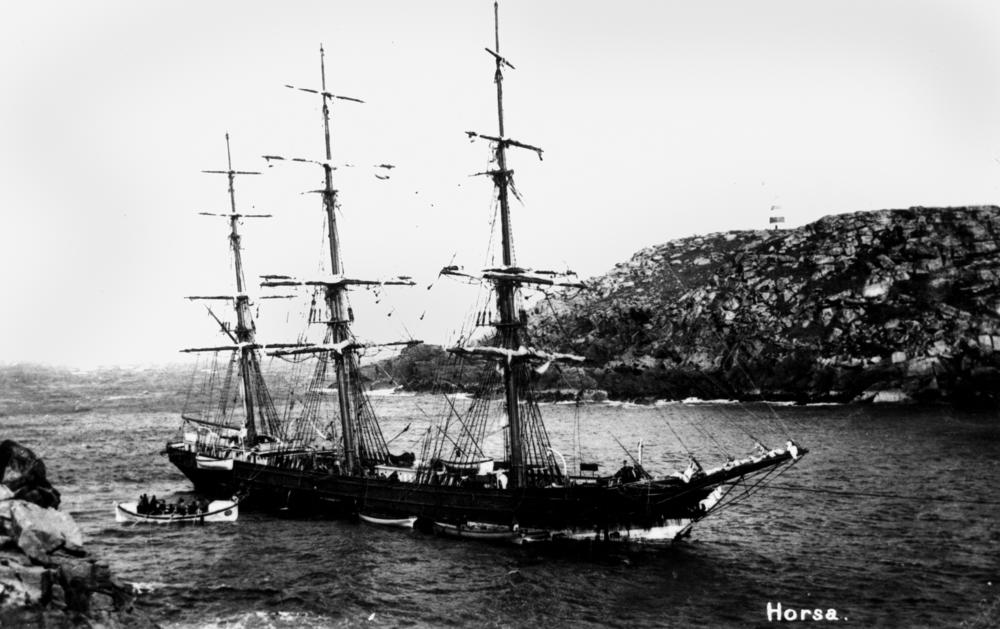
Horsa shipwreck

- February — a Truro schooner, John and Mary (United Kingdom) was found ashore on Samson after she collided with a Greek brig in St Mary's Roads. She was later towed to New Grimsby.
- 4 April — full–rigger Horsa with a cargo of oats and wool from New Zealand grounded in Bread and Cheese Cove on St Martin's. She later capsized twenty-one miles (34 km) south-west of the Bishop Rock, while being towed; there were no deaths.
- 24 November — the SS Serica nearly foundered and took shelter in St Mary's Roads on the 19th. As she left she struck an uncharted rock (later named Serica Rock) and sank.

=== 1896 ===
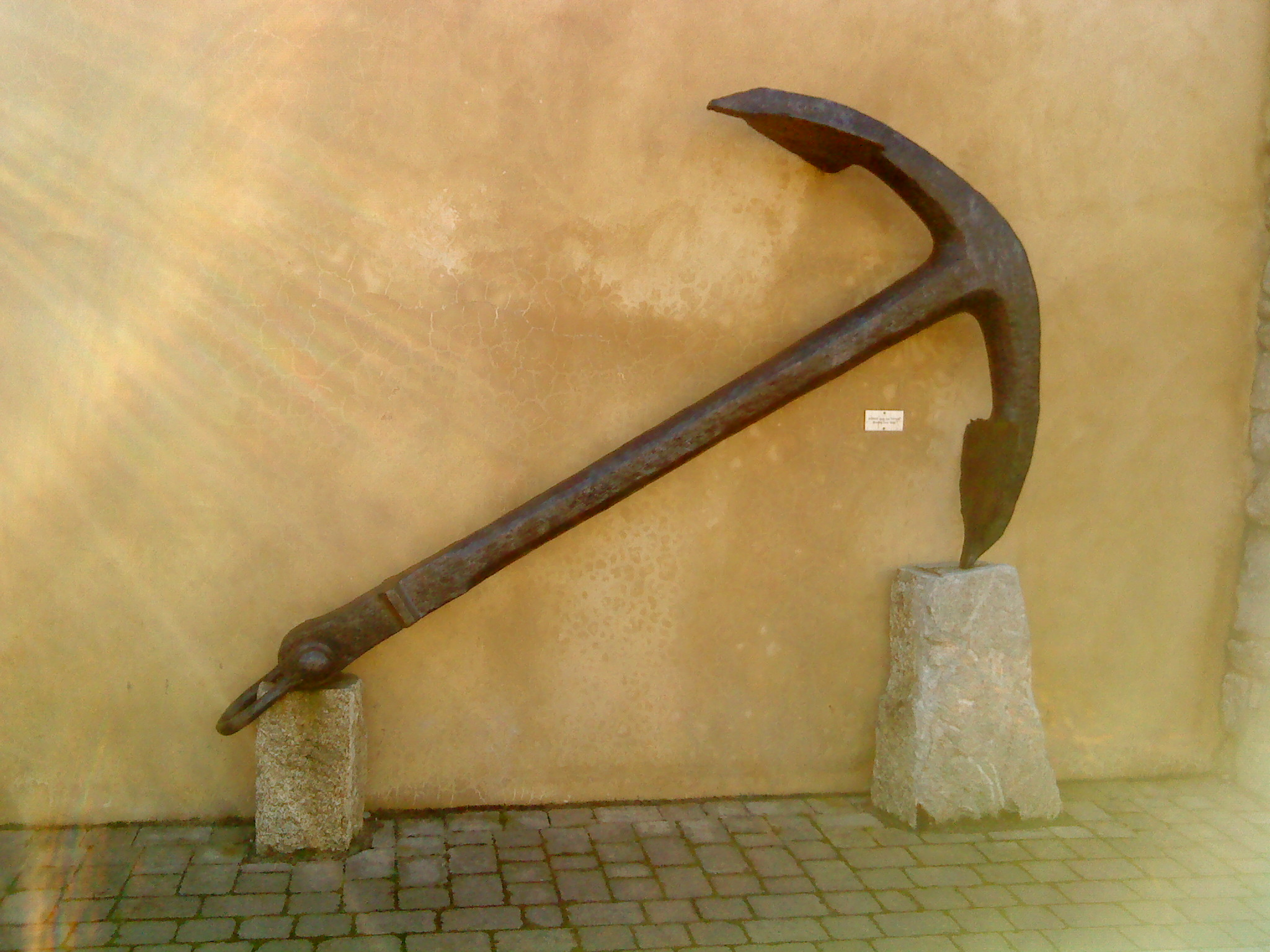
Anchor from the Sophie in the Flying Boat Club, Tresco

- 14 December — Sophie (Norway) of Fredrikstadt started to disintegrate and was abandoned along with her cargo of anthracite from Cardiff. She was towed into New Grimsby by the Lady of the Isles and sold to Thomas Dorrien-Smith who used her timbers around the Tresco estate and her cargo to heat his greenhouses.

=== 1898 ===
- 26 May — Newlyn fishing lugger Nyanza (United Kingdom) was run ashore on Great Crebawethan after hitting the Crims and springing a leak. St Agnes lifeboat, James and Caroline took off four of the crew and the fifth was saved by an island boat.
- 20 August — 2,843 ton Sunderland steamer Toledo (United Kingdom) hit Steeple Rock and ripped open her hull. Her crew managed to lower the ship's boats and escape before she sank in twenty-five fathoms.
- 15 December — 3,229 ton steamship Brinkburn struck the Maiden Bower in fog and sank, while bound for Le Havre from Galveston with cotton and cotton seed. Her crew of mainly lascars survived. An inspection of the wreck in 1966, found beneath her two other ships, one the Sussex which sank in 1885 and an unknown warship.

=== 1899 ===
- 12 February — 76-ton wooden brigantine Bohallard (France) of Nantes broke her cables during a WNW hurricane-force gale and drifted onto Pendrathen. She later floated clear and was wrecked in Higher Town Bay, where she broke up two days later.
- 7 June — Liverpool Salvage Association's steamer Ranger (United Kingdom) grounded on Crow Bar and was refloated the same day.
- 25 October — while carrying rice from Bangkok to Bremen, the Rickmer Line, full-rigged ship, Erik Rickmers (German Empire) of Bremerhaven went ashore on Scilly Rock. She later sank in deep water. Her crew of twenty-six took to the boats and landed on Bryher.
- 26 October — barque Parame (France) hit Scilly Rock, her crew of ten landed on Bryher. Her cargo of coconuts was salvaged.

== See also ==
- List of shipwrecks
- List of shipwrecks of Cornwall
- List of shipwrecks of the Seven Stones Reef
