= Palinuro (disambiguation) =

Palinuro is a hamlet in the Province of Salerno, Italy.

Palinuro may also refer to:

- Cape Palinuro, Campania, Italy
- Italian training ship Palinuro
- Volcano Palinuro, off the coast of Cilento in Southern Italy
- Massimiliano Palinuro, an Italian-born Turkish Roman Catholic prelate
- Palinuro de México, a 1976 novel by Mexican author Fernando del Paso

== See also ==
- Palinure (disambiguation)
- Palinurus (disambiguation)
