= Tresco Priory =

- The Priory of St Nicholas, Tresco
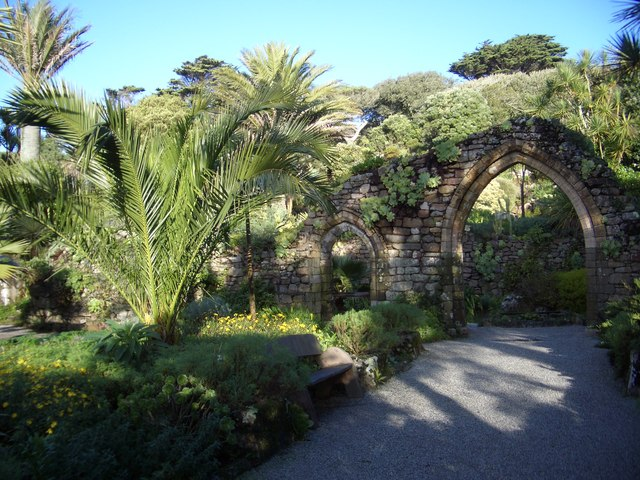
- Remains of Tresco Priory in Tresco Abbey Gardens

- Location in the Isles of Scilly
- 49°56′50″N 6°19′52″W
- OS grid reference: SV 89472 14242
- Location: Tresco
- Country: England

History
- Founded: 946 AD
- Dedication: Saint Nicholas
- Dedicated: 1114 AD

Architecture
- Heritage designation: Grade II listed

Specifications
- Length: 23.5 metres (77 ft)
- Width: 7.5 metres (25 ft)

Listed Building – Grade II
- Official name: Remains of Tresco Priory and associated monuments and attached walls
- Designated: 12 February 1975
- Reference no.: 1141172

Scheduled monument
- Official name: St Nicholas' Priory, Tresco
- Designated: 25 July 1997
- Reference no.: 1016184

Tresco Priory is a former monastic settlement on Tresco, Isles of Scilly founded in 946 AD.

It was re-founded as the Priory of St Nicholas by monks from Tavistock Abbey in 1114. A charter of King Henry I mentions a priory as belonging to Tavistock Abbey in the reign of Edward the Confessor

Henry I, King of England, A.D. 1120, grants to William, Bishop of Exeter, and to Richard, son of Baldwin, and to his Justitiary of Devonshire and Cornwall in perpetual Alms to Osbert Abbot of Tavistock and Turold his monk, all the churches of Sully with the Appurtenances and the Land such as the Monks or Hermits held in the Time of King Edward and Burgal Bishop of Cornwall.

This was duly confirmed when Pope Celestine III by his Bull (dated 4 cal. June A.D. 1193) confirms to

Herbert Abbat of Tavistock and his successors the Islands of St Nicholas (Tresco), St. Sampson, St Elidius (St. Helens), St. Theona (Tean) and the Island called Nutho (possibly Nut Rock and land surrounding, where remains of hedges etc. between it and Sampson are still to be seen underwater) with their Appurtenances and all Churches and Oratories built throughout the Islands of Sully, with the Tenths and Offerings, etc., and two pieces of digg’d ground in the Island of Agnes, and three pieces in the Isle of Ennor (St. Mary’s).

In 1367 King Edward III took the Priory under his special protection as the monks had complained that it was almost destroyed and impoverished by mariners, and in 1351 pirates had destroyed most of the Abbey property.

The Priory did not survive the Dissolution of the Monasteries and may well have closed earlier. The remains of the priory are now incorporated into Tresco Abbey Gardens.
