= Palinure =

Palinure may refer to:

- Palinure, a 1992 book of poetry by Arnaldo Calveyra
- Palinure-class brig of the French navy
  - French brig Palinure (1804)

== See also ==
- Palinurus (disambiguation)
