= SS Thames =

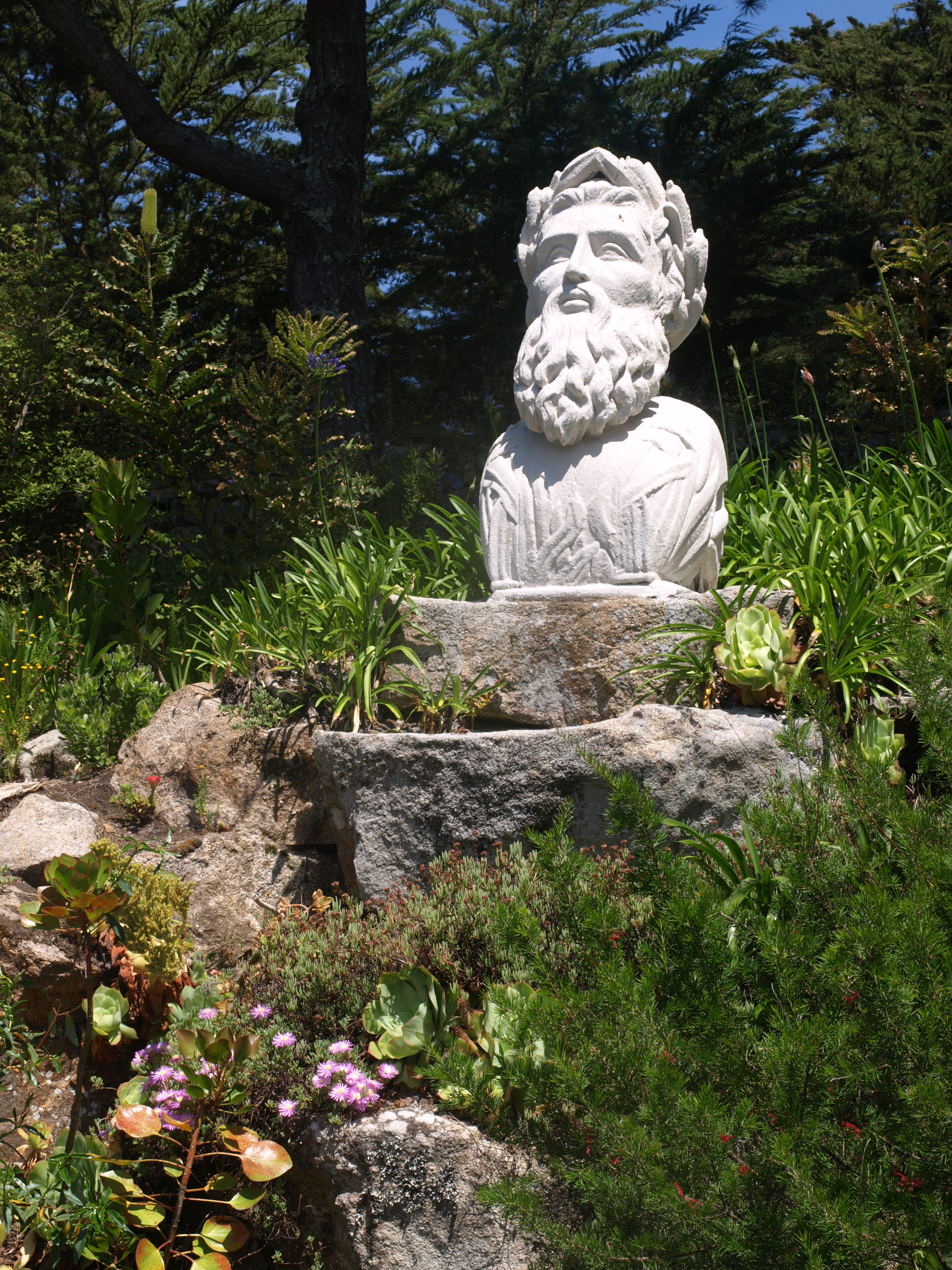
- Figurehead of the SS Thames in Tresco Abbey Gardens

History

United Kingdom
- Operator: City of Dublin Steam Packet Company
- Port of registry: United Kingdom
- Builder: Fletcher's, Limehouse
- Launched: 1827
- Fate: Wrecked 4 January 1841

General characteristics
- Type: Steamship
- Tonnage: 514 GRT

The steamship, SS Thames, was built in 1827 by Fletcher's in Limehouse, London, and belonged to the City of Dublin Steam Packet Company. She was commanded by Captain James Grey and wrecked on the Western Rocks, Isles of Scilly early on the morning of 4 January 1841 on her way from Dublin to London.

== Wreck ==
Approximate position of the wreck

According to The Times (1841), the weather was "exceedingly boisterous, with showers of hail and snow." She "shipped a heavy sea, which extinguished her fires." Then, mistaking St Agnes Lighthouse for Longships Lighthouse, they ran onto Jacky's Rock, between Rosevear and Crebawethan, at around 5 am.

Of the sixty-five passengers and crew, there were only four survivors: a "young lady passenger" named Morris, two female attendants and a seaman. A boat crew from St Agnes set off as soon as the wreck was discovered by locals and rescued the three women. A fourth woman who survived the initial sinking refused to leave with rescuers because she could not find her child. Local pilots were unable to offer any further assistance because it was low tide and the pilot boats were aground. By 11 am, Thames was lost to the sea.

The only other survivor was the seaman who had made his way to Rosevear on a piece of driftwood. He survived on the exposed island for 24 hours before being discovered by boatmen. A porter cask had found its way to the rock from the wreck. The seaman took a drink before emptying it to use as an overnight shelter.

Ten bodies were found, including that of the woman who refused to leave her child. The casualties were buried on the island of St Mary's.

The figurehead from the ship was salvaged and is now on display at Tresco Abbey Gardens.

== See also ==
- List of shipwrecks of the Isles of Scilly
