= Luciole (barge) =

History

France
- Name: Luciole
- Owner: Inland Voyages Ltd
- Port of registry: Paris
- Route: Nivernais Canal: Auxerre to Clamecy
- Builder: Chantiers de Petite-Synthe, Dunkerque
- Launched: 1926
- Christened: Ponctuel
- Acquired: 1966
- Renamed: Palinurus (1966), Luciole (1985)
- Homeport: Auxerre
- Status: In service

General characteristics
- Class & type: Hotel barge
- Tonnage: 170 tons
- Length: 114 ft 0 in (34.75 m)
- Beam: 16 ft 7 in (5.05 m)
- Height: 9 ft 8 in (2.95 m)
- Draught: 3.25 ft 3 in (1.07 m)
- Decks: 2
- Installed power: 2 × 360 volt generators (32 + 30 KVA)
- Propulsion: Perkins Sabre M130C diesel (95.68 kW (128.3 hp))
- Speed: 7 knots (13 km/h; 8.1 mph) maximum
- Capacity: 12 passengers
- Crew: 6 crew

Luciole is a converted French barge, or péniche. She was built in 1926. In 1966 she became the first hotel barge on the French canal system. She now operates on the Canal du Nivernais and River Yonne, her home mooring is in Auxerre.

== History ==
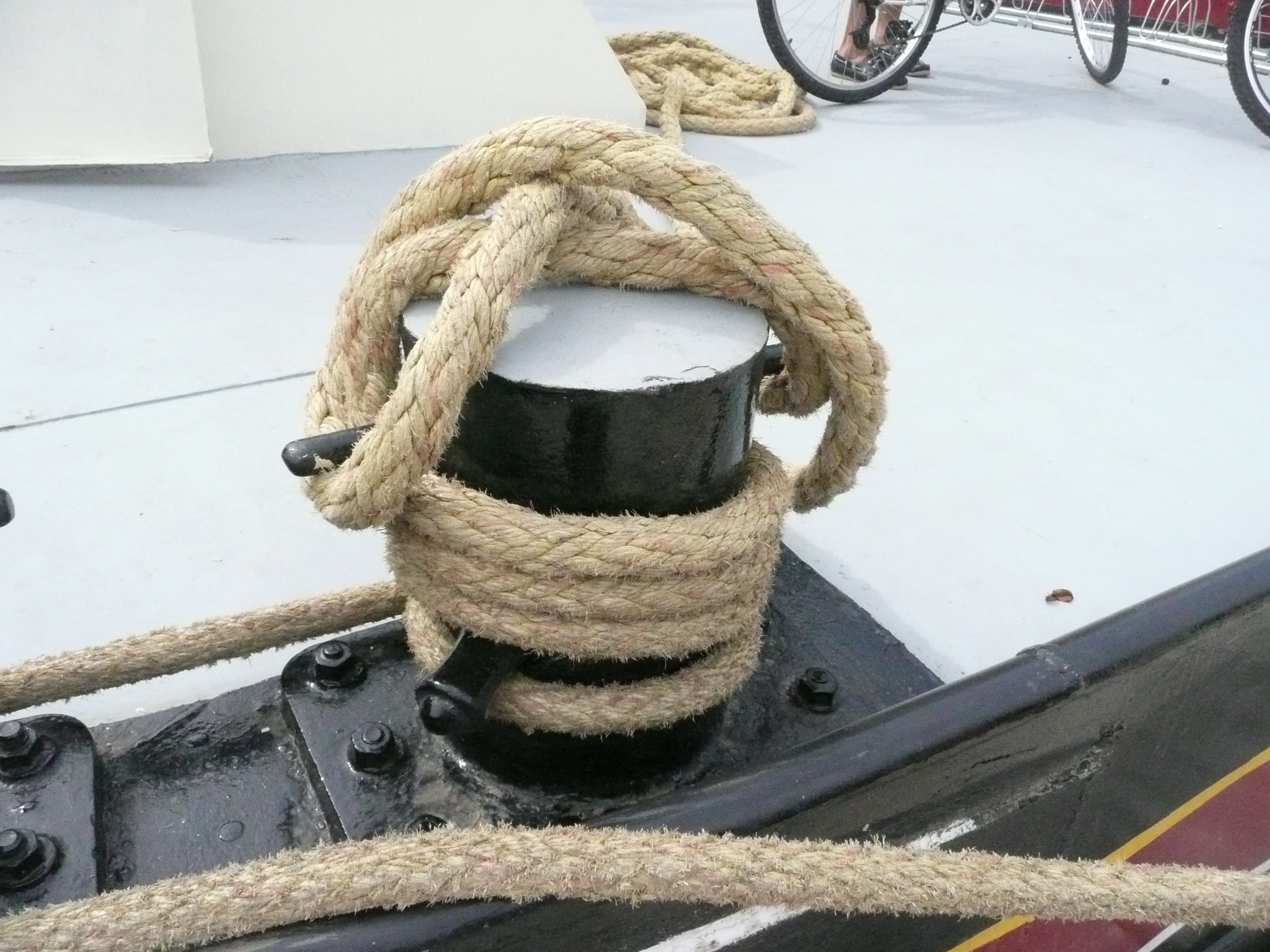
Ship's bollard

Luciole was constructed in 1926 at the Chantiers de Petite-Synthe in Dunkerque as the mule-drawn vessel Ponctuel. Later equipped with an engine, she carried 180 tons of cargo. In 1966 Richard Parsons, bought her and converted her to become the first hotel-barge plying the rivers and canals of France, under the name Palinurus, carrying 22 passengers. She operated in the Burgundy region, before moving southward to the Canal du Midi and Canal Latéral à la Garonne.

In 1985 she was purchased by the British company Inland Voyages Ltd and brought back to Burgundy. There she was rebuilt, with a raised superstructure, and with the interior remodelled to carry 12 passengers in six double or twin bedded cabins and two single cabins, all with air-conditioning and en-suite bathrooms.

Recent modifications include the lengthening of the vessel from the previous 30.75 metres (100 ft 11 in) to 34.75 metres (114 ft 0 in). In 2020 a new three-phase generator with cooling and propeller shaft was installed in the engine room, this was done in a shipyard in Paris.

== Current operation ==
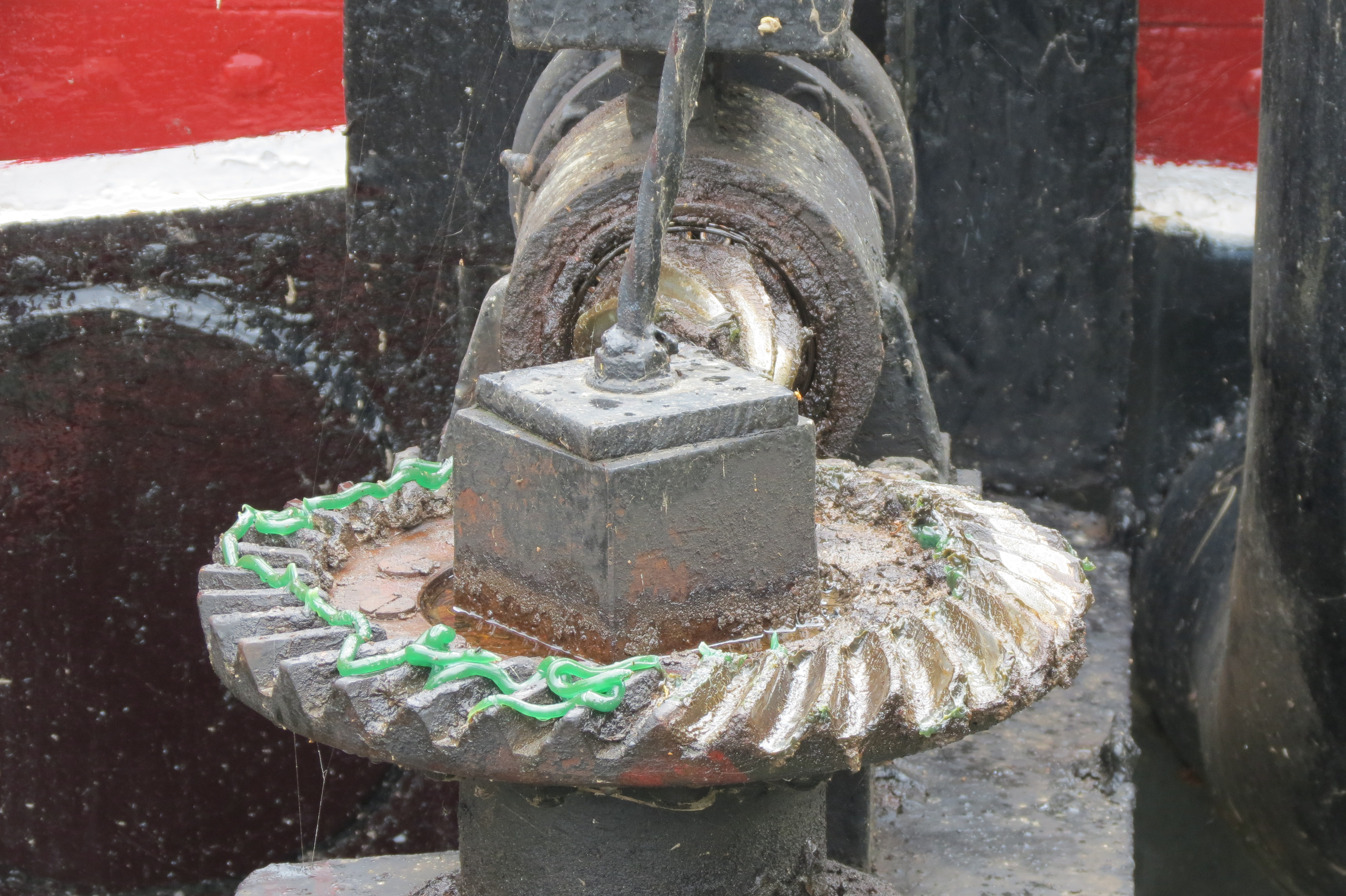
Luciole's rudder gear

Luciole is now operated by John, Penny & Will Liley, whose Inland Voyages Ltd company, formed in 1976, previously operated the hotel-barge Secunda. John Liley is a noted waterway author, whose book France - the Quiet Way, provides a guide to all inland waterways in France.

Luciole operates weekly voyages between Auxerre and the town of Clamecy, a scenic route on the Canal du Nivernais and River Seine, passing through 36 locks - these have restricted dimensions, which the boat is specifically designed to pass. There is a crew of 6 including a captain, deckhand, tour guide, chef and hosts.

== Interior ==
The barge is split between two decks, with eight en-suite cabins on the lower deck and a galley, saloon and sundeck on the upper deck. At the rear is a large engine room and crew quarters.
