= Tresco Abbey Gardens =

Gardens in Tresco, United Kingdom

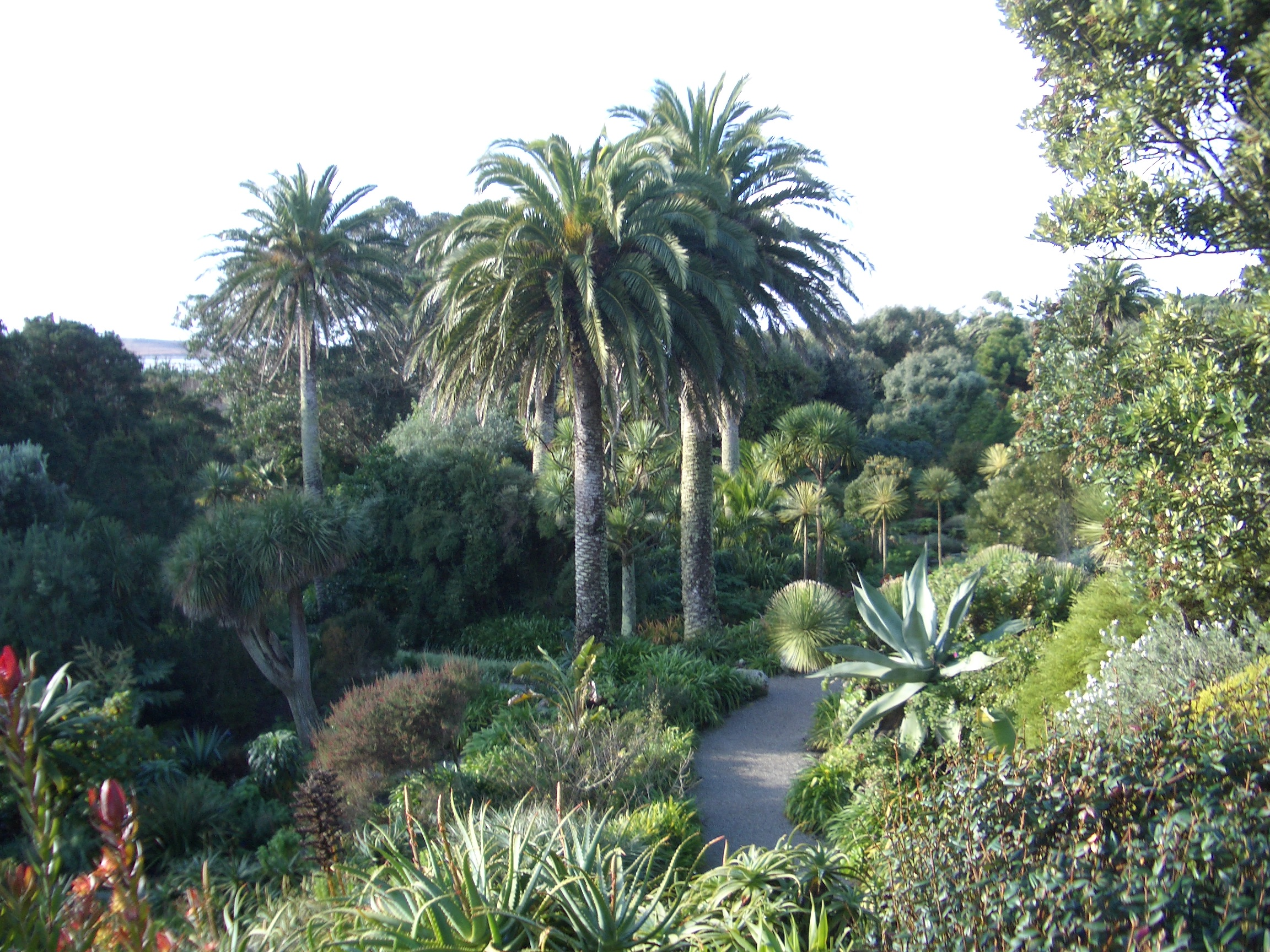
- Tresco Abbey Gardens, 2007

- Location within Isles of Scilly
- Type: Botanical
- Location: Tresco, Isles of Scilly, England
- Coordinates: 49°56′52″N 6°19′57″W
- Area: 17 acres (6.9 hectares)
- Opened: 1834
- Founder: Augustus Smith
- Owner: Robert Dorrien-Smith
- Operator: Tresco Estate
- Website: tresco.co.uk/enjoying/abbey-garden

Tresco Abbey Gardens are located on the island of Tresco in the Isles of Scilly, United Kingdom. The 17-acre (7 ha) gardens were established by the nineteenth-century proprietor of the islands, Augustus Smith, originally as a private garden within the grounds of the home he designed and built. The gardens are designated at Grade I in the Register of Historic Parks and Gardens.

== Tresco Abbey ==
Tresco Abbey in 2017

Augustus Smith chose Tresco as the site of his home because the site was more or less central in relation to the rest of the islands. It is also close to the original abbey ruins, is near a fresh water pool and overlooks the sand dunes and beach at Carn Near.

The area at the time was barren land and the original building, designed by Smith and started in 1835, was small in comparison to the current building. He made additions to the house in 1843 and 1861.

The Grade II listed house consists of roughly coursed granite with ashlar dressings and a slate roof. Some of the timbers from the 1861 wreck of the Award were used for the panelling and roof of the new dining room, as well as panelling of the rooms Annet, Rosevean and Rosevear. His successor, Thomas Smith-Dorrien-Smith, added the tower in 1891.

== Abbey Gardens ==
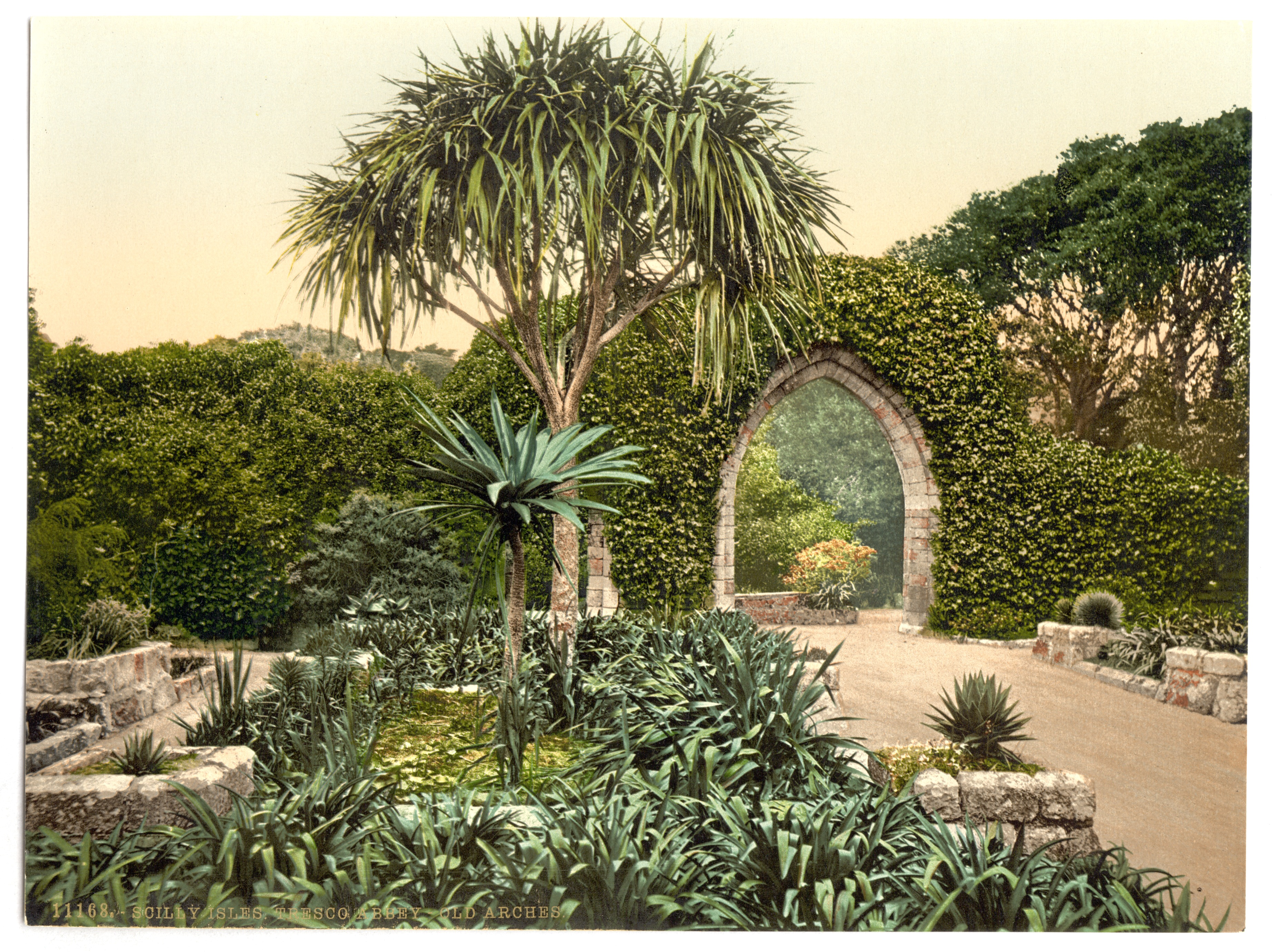
The arch from the wall of the mediæval monastery. Photo from ca. 1890 to 1900.

The Middle Terrace

When Augustus Smith chose the area for his house and garden one of his first acts was to build a granite wall for shelter and to scatter gorse (Ulex europaeus) seeds. The seeds were brought from the mainland which suggests that the main gorse plant on the islands was western gorse (Ulex gallii) which, being a low growing plant, would not provide as much shelter. Within the gardens are the remains of a Benedictine abbey founded in 964 AD, although the majority of what remains today comes from the Priory of St Nicholas founded by monks from Tavistock Abbey in 1114. There were hardly any trees on the island and the gorse did not provide enough protection so he planted shelterbelts. The first were mainly deciduous trees such as, elm (Ulmus sp), sycamore (Acer pseudoplatanus), oak (Quercus sp) and poplar (Populus sp), and later he planted Monterey cypress (Cupressus macrocarpa) and Monterey pine (Pinus radiata) which are fast growing and suited to coastal conditions.

In 1868 it was reported that a specimen of the Puya chilensis was in flower for the third time, and was considered the only specimen in Britain planted outdoors. It was said to have been planted 25 years previously having been obtained from the dispersion of Messrs Loddiges collection.

A large expansion to the collection was undertaken by Arthur Dorrien-Smith in the early years of the 20th century. He made many trips to South Africa looking for suitable trees and plants. He went on the 1907 Sub-Antarctic Islands Scientific Expedition, which had as its primary object magnetic observation in the Auckland and Campbell Islands. Following the expedition he travelled widely in New Zealand, as well as making a shorter visit to Australia. In 1909 he again visited Australia, New Zealand and the Chatham Islands, returning on SS Athenic. By this time he had amassed a total collection of plants and seeds of about 2280 specimens.

Because of the mild winter climate, the long hours of summer sunshine, and the high walls and hedges around the garden protecting it from the Atlantic winds, the garden is now home to plants from all over the world: the Mediterranean, South America, South Africa and Australasia.

In 1965 the charge for entry to the garden was increased from 3s. 6d to 5s. (equivalent to £4.23 in 2025). At that time the visitor numbers were about 30,000 annually. By 2010 the charge was £10.00 (equivalent to £15.45 in 2025).

=== Weather ===
On 30 March 1886 a severe hailstorm passed over the islands which caused significant damage to greenhouses recently erected and some windows in the Abbey were broken.

In January 1987 the garden experienced a prolonged period of freezing temperatures combined with a wind chill which killed off many of the more tender plants and trees. New plants were sourced over the next year to replace those lost from the collection.

Three years later on 25 January 1990 the gardens experienced Cyclone Daria which with wind speeds of 127 miles per hour (204 km/h) brought down around 800 of the mature trees which were some 120 to 130 years old.

On 8 January 2026 Storm Goretti brought winds of 99 miles per hour (159 km/h) which brought devastation to the shelter belts and 400 magnificent tree specimens were lost.

=== Red squirrels ===
Eurasian Red Squirrels in Tresco

In 2012 five red squirrels were introduced into the Abbey Gardens. Only two survived so in 2013 the British Wildlife Centre in Surrey provided a new colony which was flown to Tresco by helicopter on a routine flight from RNAS Culdrose.

The Monterey pine trees from California produce large pine cones which provide a good source of food for them. By 2019 the population had grown to around 100.

=== Head Gardeners ===
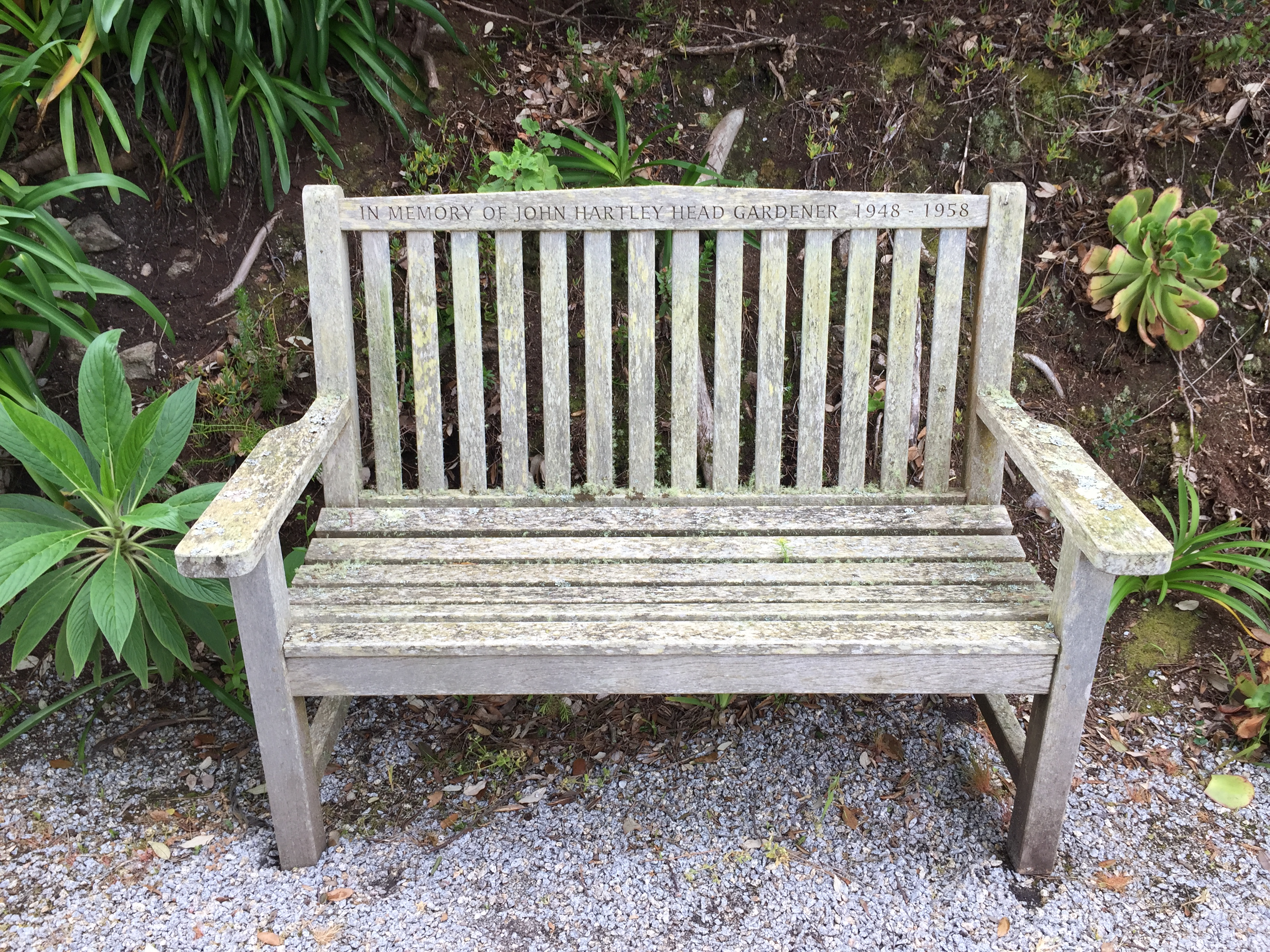
Bench in Memory of John Hartley, Head Gardener 1948-1958

- Mr. Batchelor
- George Davis Vallance ca. 1875 - 1881 (b. 9 Oct 1822 d. 17 Aug 1889) (cite 1881 England Census; Guide to the Isles of Scilly, Tonkin & Tonkin, 1882, pub. F. Rodda))
- James Jenkins 1881 - 1922
- William George Andrews 1922 - 1947
- John Hartley 1948 - 1958
- Geoffrey Elvin Collins 1958 - 1959 (b. 1930, d. 2011) (afterwards curator at Birmingham Botanical Gardens)
- Christopher Chowins 1961 - 1962
- Mr. D. Little 1962 - 1963
- J.D.H. Smith 1963 - ????
- Frank Naylor ca. 1966
- Peter Clough 1973 - 1984 (formerly head gardener at Achamore House, Isle of Gigha)
- Mike Nelhams 1984 - 1993 (afterwards Garden Curator)
- Andrew Lawson 1993 - current

== Valhalla Museum ==
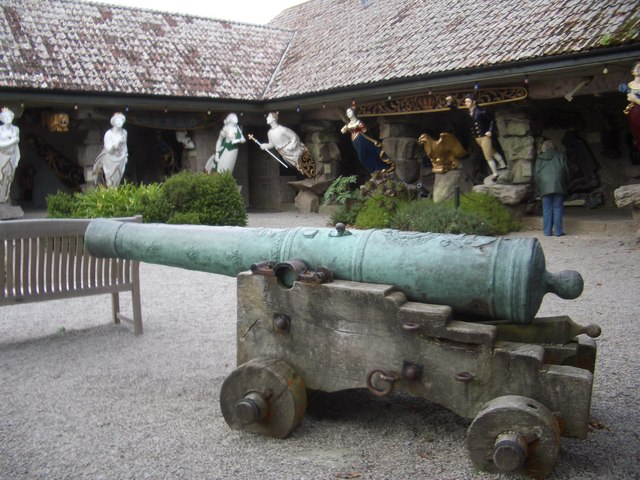
Valhalla

Examples of the figureheads

The Valhalla Museum within Tresco Abbey Gardens features the Valhalla Collection containing some 30 figureheads, as well as name-boards and other decorative carvings from the days of sail. The collection was started by Augustus Smith. Most of the figureheads date from the middle and end of the 19th century and come from merchant sailing vessels or early steamships that were wrecked on the Isles of Scilly. Some of the ships which are represented in the collection are:

- a 17th-century stern decoration of the Greek god Boreas and possibly carved by Pierre Puget, is said to be from a French ship wrecked on Annet in that century.
- HMS Association - wrecked on the night of 22 October 1707 (Old style) in the Scilly naval disaster of 1707. The bronze cannon was salvaged from this wreck in 1970. It is a French 18-pounder bronze gun, probably a trophy from the siege of Toulon (1707). The main decoration shows the arms of France and Navarre surrounded by the collars of the orders of St Michel and the St Esprit, surmounted by a crown.
- SS Thames — wrecked 4 January 1841 near Gorregan and Rosevear.
- Alessandro II Grande — wrecked 1 January 1851 when she was blown on the Mare ledges, off the south shore of Tresco. There was no loss of life. The figurehead is of Tsar Alexander I.
- Mary Hay — wrecked 13 April 1852 after hitting the Steeple Rock, on the Bream Ledges which is between Mincarlo and Samson.
- Chieftain — said to be wrecked in 1856 off St Martin's Head. There is no record of a ship with that name in the Lloyd's Register
- Award — wrecked 19 March 1861 when she was driven onto Gweal during a force 8 to 9 NNW gale. Her crew of 24 managed to scramble ashore.
- Primos — wrecked 24 June 1871 on the Seven Stones reef.
- River Lune — wrecked 27 June 1879 on the Brothers Rock in Muncoy Neck, between Melledgan and Annet.
- Bernardo – sank on Annet in 1888. Her figurehead is said to be St Bernard of Clairvaux.
- Lofaro — wrecked 2 February 1902 struck Merrick Rock, St Martin's with the loss of her crew.

== See also ==
- Listed buildings in Tresco, Isles of Scilly
- List of shipwrecks of the Isles of Scilly
- Tresco Priory
