= Admiral Barton =

Admiral Barton may refer to:

- Andrew Barton (privateer) (c. 1466–1511), Lord High Admiral of Scotland
- John Kennedy Barton (1853–1921), U.S. Navy rear admiral
- Matthew Barton (Royal Navy officer) (c. 1715–1795), British Royal Navy admiral
