= Rosevear =

Island in the Isles of Scilly, United Kingdom

Ros Veur
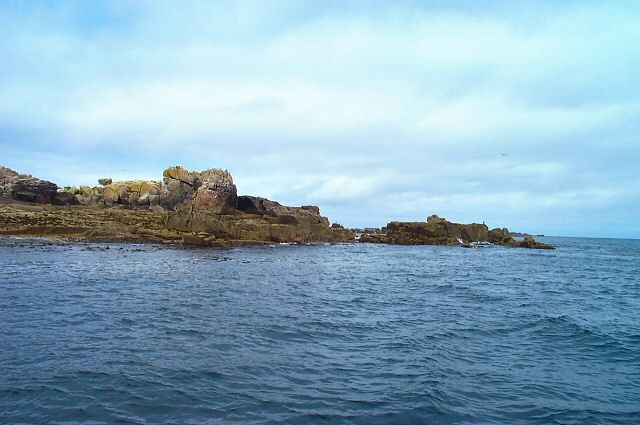
- Northern tip of Rosevear

- Location within Isles of Scilly

Geography
- Coordinates: 49.87°N 6.40°W
- OS grid reference: SV839059
- Archipelago: Isles of Scilly

Administration
- United Kingdom
- Civil parish: St Agnes

Demographics
- Population: 0

Rosevear (Cornish: Ros Veur "great promontory") is the largest (0.63 hectares (1.6 acres)) of the group of rocks known as the Western Rocks, Isles of Scilly. The islands are on the eastern side of the Atlantic Ocean on the south-west approaches to the island of Great Britain and are renowned for the numerous shipwrecks in the area and the nearby Bishop Rock lighthouse. All the uninhabited islands are owned by the Duchy of Cornwall and are managed by the Isles of Scilly Wildlife Trust, which looks after the archaeological and historical remains on the islands, as well as the flora and fauna. Landing is not allowed on the island.

== Geography ==
Rosevear is the largest of the Western Rocks and has a relatively flat top to 5 metres (16 ft). The island is situated within a 3-kilometre-long (1.9-mile) group of rocks which stretches from the Round Rock of Crebawethan in the north to Pednathise Head in the south.

== History ==
The island was used as a base camp, during 1709 and 1710, for the Herbert salvage expedition, which worked the wrecks of the Association and the other naval vessels in 1707.

The ghost of opera singer and actress Ann Cargill, who died when the British East India Company packet ship Nancy sank near Rosevear on 24 February 1784, is said to haunt the island. Her body, still clutching her 18-month-old son, was originally buried on Rosevear, although she was later moved to Old Town Church on St Mary's, along with her child and Halden, the captain. In the 1840s and 1850s the island was again inhabited by workmen, this time building the Bishop Rock lighthouse. It was said that they heard mysterious music and were troubled by ghosts.

Following a decision to build a lighthouse on the Bishop Rock in April 1847, Trinity House decided to make Rosevear the base because it was the nearest island (3.2 km) with a relatively flat area. The island was used as a base from 1847 to 1850, for the unsuccessful first attempt and for the successful construction from 1851 to 1858. Four main elements of the base remain. Two buildings, one a workers' lodge and mess and the other a workshop, are to the north-west of the complex, a slab-built platform by the east coast and a smiths hearth between the lodgings and workshop. Another building can be seen further south on the east coast. The surviving walls are from 0.4 m to 0.7 m high, with the best preserved are up to 3.0 m. The remains were designated as a scheduled monument in 1997.

A ship's funnel lies amongst the rocks of Rosevear; this comes from the Cité de Verdun, which was wrecked on Rosevear in 1925.

== Natural history ==
Landing on the uninhabited islands is both difficult and discouraged, and there are few published records of visits by naturalists. In 1971, the rocks and islands were designated a Site of Special Scientific Interest for their breeding sea birds. A visit by Geoffrey Grigson, in or around 1947, found a few Atlantic puffin (Fratercula arctica), scores of razorbill (Alca torda), European shag (Phalacrocorax aristotelis) and great black-backed gull (Larus marinus). A heavy fall of migrants was seen on a visit by Rosemary Parslow in October 1990 with dozens of European robin (Erithacus rubecula) and goldcrest (Regulus regulus), and several yellow–browed warbler (Phylloscopus inornatus); all feeding amongst the vegetation. The island has replaced Melledgan as the site of the third largest colony of European storm petrel (Hydrobates pelagicus) in England with fifty-seven occupied sites recorded during the Seabird 2000 survey, increasing to 129 occupied sites in the repeat survey in 2006. The colony of shag on Rosevear and the rest of the Western Rocks is of national importance.

During storms the sea can wash over the island, and there is a shingle community of plants with tree mallow (Lavatera arborea), sea curled dock (Rumex crispus littoreus) and Atriplex sp. The only other species recorded are sea beet (Beta vulgaris subsp. maritima), common scurvygrass (Cochlearia officinalis), orache sp, and rock sea-spurry (Spergularia rupicola).
