= William Lisle (disambiguation) =

William Lisle was a politician.

William Lisle may also refer to:

- William Lisle (died 1442), MP for Oxfordshire (UK Parliament constituency)
- William L'Isle, scholar of Anglo-Saxon
- William Lisle (Royal Navy officer)
