= Western Rocks, Isles of Scilly =

Group of rocks in the Isles of Scilly, England, United Kingdom

Western Rocks
- Site of Special Scientific Interest
- Location within Isles of Scilly
- Location of Western Rocks.
- Area of search: Cornwall
- Grid reference: SV850070
- Coordinates: 49.8702°N 6.4006°W
- Interest: Biological
- Area: 62.7 hectares (0.627 km^{2}; 0.242 sq mi)
- Notification date: 1971

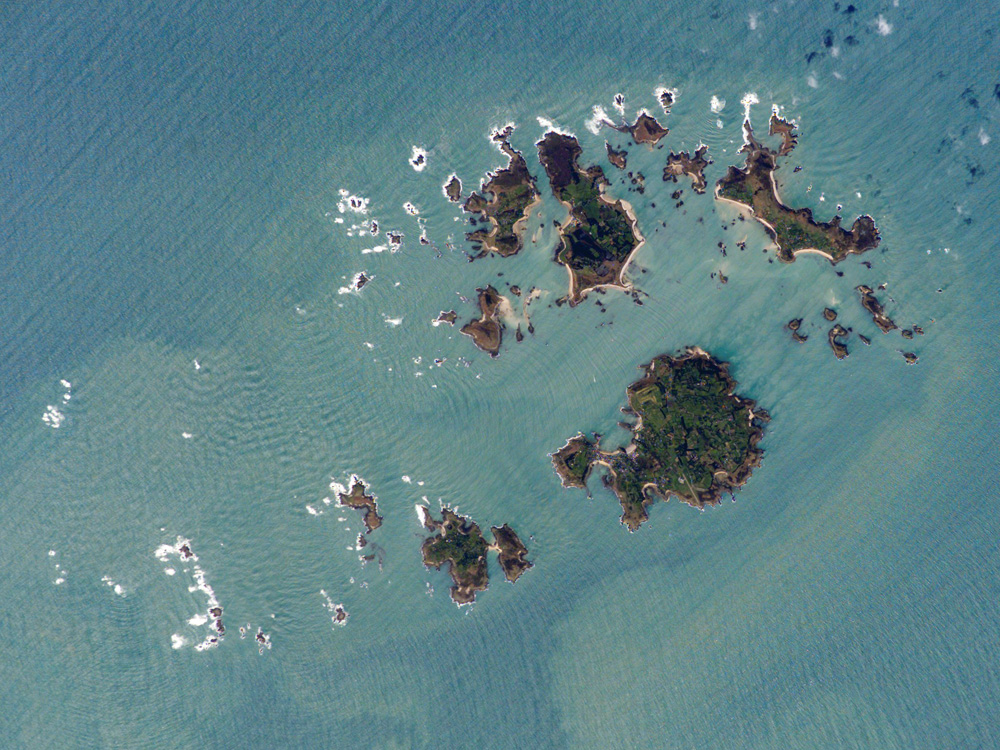
The Isles of Scilly. The Western Rocks are the archipelago in the lower left of this image.

The Western Rocks (Cornish: Karregi Gorlewen) are a group of uninhabited skerries and rocks in the south-western part of the Isles of Scilly, United Kingdom, and are renowned for the numerous shipwrecks in the area and the nearby Bishop Rock lighthouse. In 1971, the rocks and islands were designated a Site of Special Scientific Interest for their breeding sea birds. Landing on the islands is both difficult and discouraged and there are few published records of visits by naturalists.

== Nature reserve ==
The islands are largely managed as nature reserves by the Isles of Scilly Wildlife Trust, principally for breeding seabirds and grey seals (Halichoerus grypus). There are eleven species of breeding seabirds with the European shag (Gulosus aristotelis) and European storm petrel (Hydrobates pelagicus) of national importance. The other species are kittiwake (Rissa tridactyla), razorbill (Alca torda), guillemot (Uria aalge), cormorant (Phalacrocorax carbo), fulmar (Fulmarus glacialis), puffin (Fratercula arctica), great black-backed gull (Larus marinus), lesser black-backed gull (Larus fuscus) and herring gull (Larus argentatus).

The only breeding sites for European storm petrel in England are on the Isles of Scilly with eleven colonies and an estimated 1475 occupied sites (i.e. breeding pairs). Melledgan did have the third largest colony on Scilly with 140 occupied sites recorded during the Seabird 2000 survey declining to 69 occupied sites in a repeat survey in 2006. It was replaced by Roseveor in 2006 with 129 breeding pairs. Other Western Rock colonies are on Gorregan and Rosevean.

== Geography ==
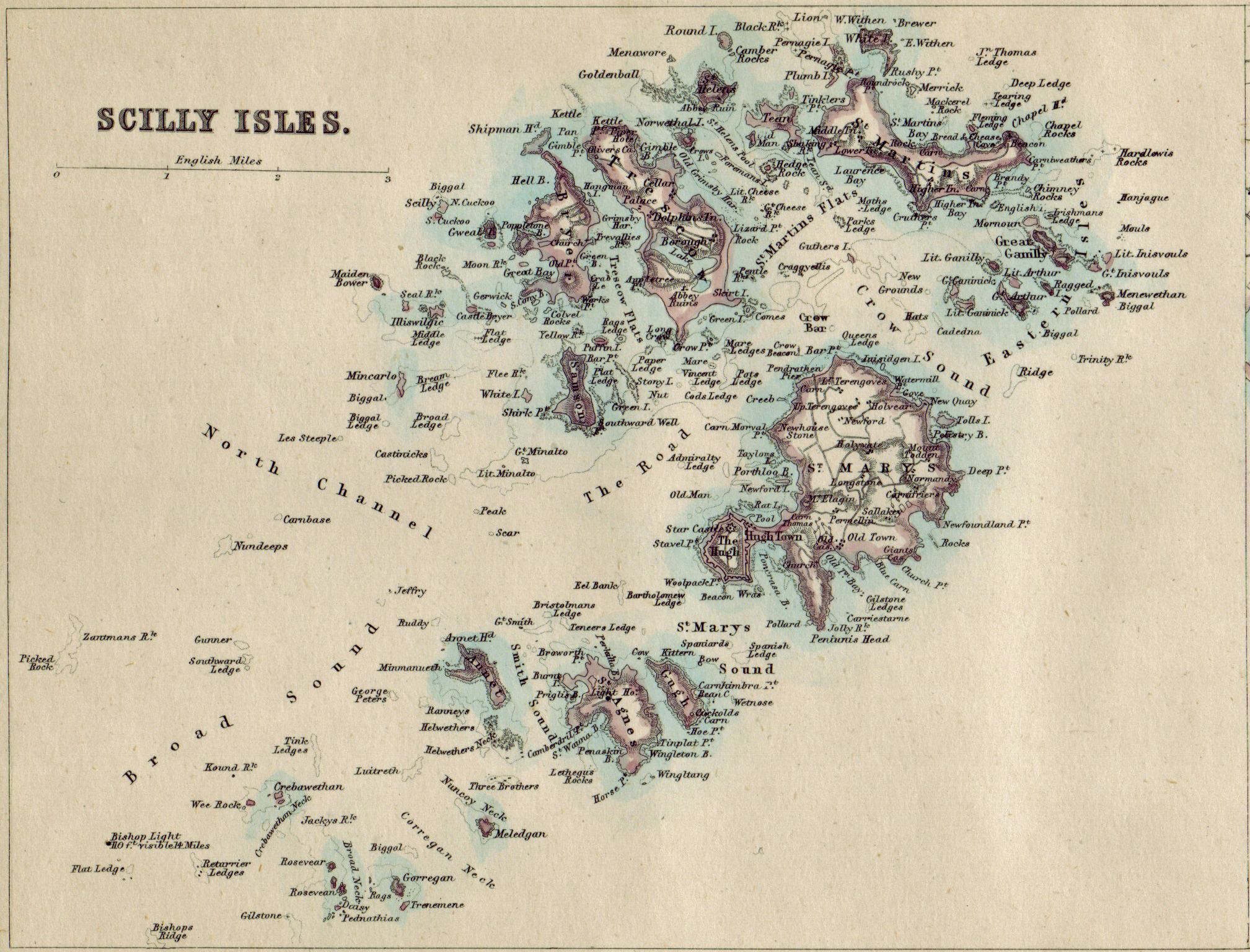
"Scilly Isles"; John Bartholomew

All of the Western Rocks are composed of Hercynian granite of late Carboniferous age with thin podzolic soils on the larger ones. They are located south-west of St Mary's, with Annet and St Agnes immediately to the north-east and the Bishop Rock to the west. The larger islands in this archipelago are, from north to south: Great Crebawethan, Rosevear, Rosevean, Daisy and Pednathise Head (the most southerly point of the United Kingdom). Rosevear Ledge and the Gilstone Reef are just to the west of this group. Smaller islands within the Western Rocks are: Codnors Rocks, Little Crebawethan, Jolly Rock, Jacky's Rock, Silver Carn, Gorregan and Melledgan.

== Individual islands and rocks ==
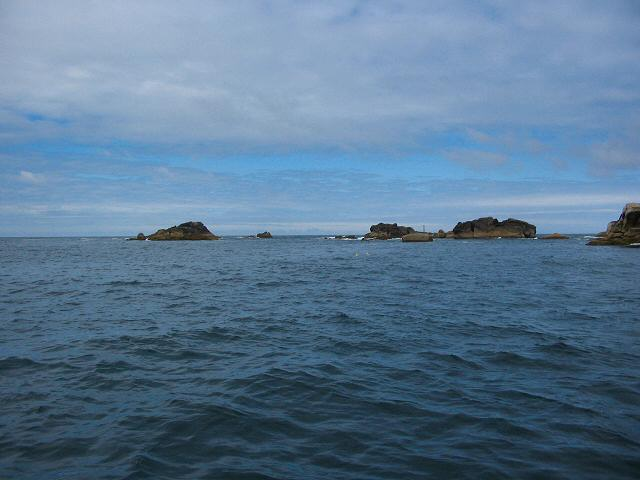
View of the Western Rocks

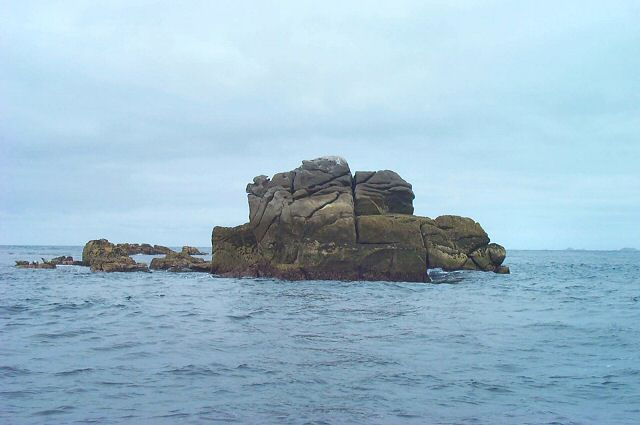
Gorregan

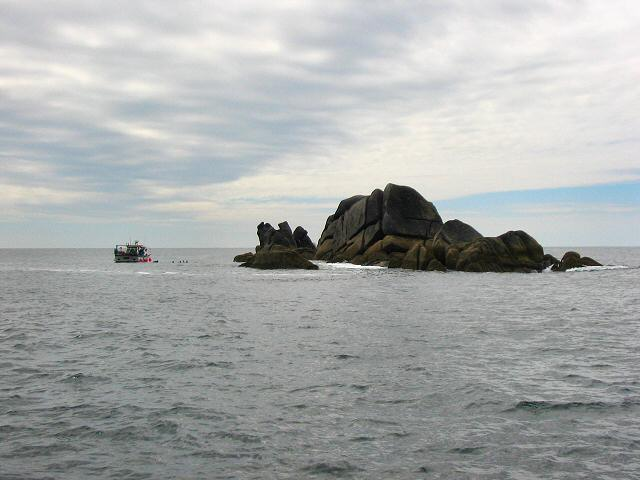
Trenemene, seen from Gorregan

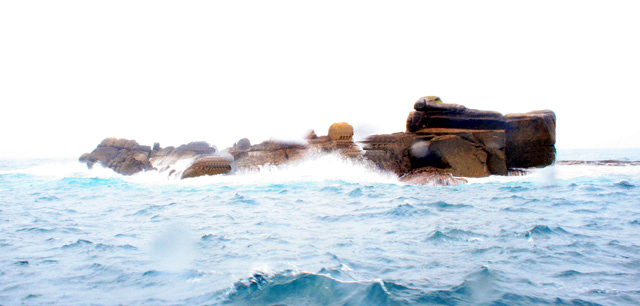
Little Crebawethan

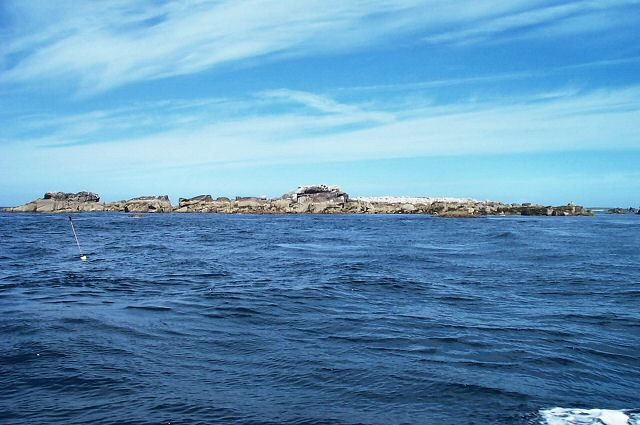
Melledgan

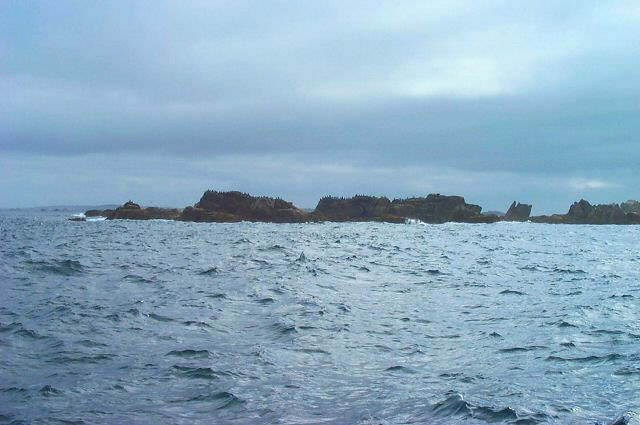
Rags

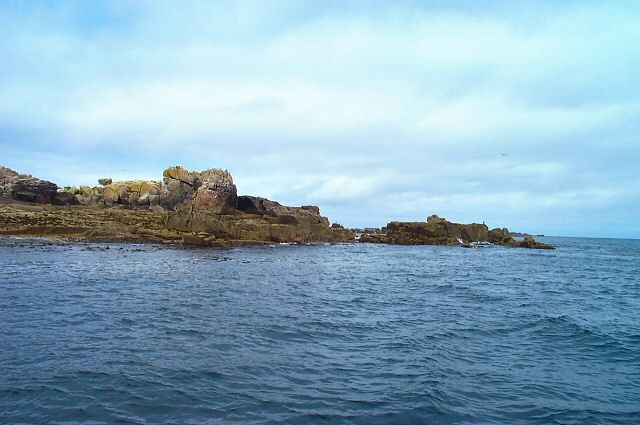
Rosevear

Some of the islands and rocks are listed below. Area is measured at MHWS (figures are provided by the Isles of Scilly Wildlife Trust):

=== Daisy ===
(grid reference SV839053) 0.57 hectares (1.4 acres) in size.

A haul-out site for grey seal.

=== Gilstone ===
(grid reference SV832053)

The Gilstone (Gilstone Reef or Gilstone Rock, for an image see here) is also known as Outer Gilstone Rock to distinguish it from a rock off Old Town Bay on St Mary's which is also called Gilstone. Gilstone has been the cause of many of the shipwrecks recorded in the Isles of Scilly, most notably the sinking of Admiral Sir Cloudesley Shovell's flagship HMS Association in the naval disaster of 1707 with the loss of over 1400 lives.

=== Gorregan ===
(Cornish: Karrek Aman, lit. 'rock butter') (grid reference SV847056) 1.57 hectares (3.9 acres) in size.

The smooth square fissured rocks of Gorregan (8 metres (26 ft) high) is a contrast to the other islands which are a "disordered jumble" of rocks. The only plants recorded are common scurvygrass (Cochlearia officinalis), rock sea-spurrey (Spergularia rupicola) and orache (Atriplex sp). The breeding colony of European storm petrel had 49 occupied sites recorded during the Seabird 2000 survey and there is a large colony of kittiwake, although in 1984 there was no breeding because of (possible) predation by carrion crow (Corvus corone) or common raven (Corvus corax). Other breeding birds are razorbill and guillemot. Grey seals use the island as a pupping site.

=== Great Crebawethan ===
(Cornish: Krib an Wedhen, lit. 'reef of the tree') (grid reference SV830071) 0.51 hectares (1.3 acres) in size.

The island was surveyed for European storm petrel during the Seabird 2000 survey with none found.

=== Hellweathers ===
(Cornish: Hal Varghes, lit. 'marsh horses') (grid reference SV864079)

A group of rocks to the south of Annet.

=== Little Crebawethan ===
(Cornish: Kribyn an Wedhen, lit. 'little reef of the tree') (grid reference SV827069) 0.14 hectares (0.35 acres) in size.

=== Melledgan ===
(Cornish: Melhwesen, lit. 'slug, snail') (grid reference SV861064) 0.96 hectares (2.4 acres) in size.

Melledgan was the site of the third largest colony of European storm petrel in England with 140 occupied sites recorded during the Seabird 2000 survey declining to 69 occupied sites in a repeat survey in 2006 and being replaced by Roseveor. Cormorant and shag also breed on the island and it is a main pupping and haul-out site for grey seal. The seals' droppings enrich the shingle plant community. Plants recorded are tree mallow (Lavatera arborea), spear-leaved orache (Atriplex prostrata) and common scurvygrass.

A rare sea slug, Babakina anadoni was found in UK waters for the first time in August 2022. In the eastern Atlantic, this sea slug has only been recorded a few times; off the west coast of Spain and further south on Atlantic coasts.

=== Retarrier Ledges ===
(grid reference SV820059) Lying between the Bishop Rock to the north-west and Rosevean to the south-east, their claim to fame is loss of 335 lives when the German liner SS Schiller hit the rocks in 1875.

=== Rosevean ===
(Cornish: Ros Vian, lit. 'little promontory') (grid reference SV839056) 0.63 hectares (1.6 acres) in area and the highest of the Western Rocks with a maximum height of 17 metres (56 ft).

Apart from the occasional plant Rosevean consists mainly of bare rocks and is important for its breeding birds and, as a haul-out site for grey seals. The island was surveyed for European storm petrel during the Seabird 2000 survey with 37 occupied sites recorded.

=== Rosevear ===
(Cornish: Ros Veur, lit. 'great promontory') (grid reference SV839059) 2.17 hectares (5.4 acres) in size.

Rosevear is the largest of the Western Rocks, with a relatively flat top to 5 metres (16 ft). In 1709 and 1710 the island was used as a base camp for the Herbert salvage expedition, which worked the wrecks of the Association and other vessels wrecked in 1707. In the 1840s and 1850s it was again inhabited by workmen, this time building the Bishop Rock lighthouse.

The island has replaced Melledgan as the site of the third largest colony of European storm petrel in England, with 57 occupied sites recorded during the Seabird 2000 survey, increasing to 129 occupied sites in the repeat survey in 2006. The colony of shag on Rosevear and the rest of the Western Rocks is of national importance.

== Other named rocks and reefs ==
- Inner Rags (grid reference SV845058)
- Jacky's Rock (grid reference SV83600639)
- Old Bess (grid reference SV83600518)
- Pednathise Head (grid reference SV83700525)
- Rags (grid reference SV844057)

== The Western Rocks in history ==
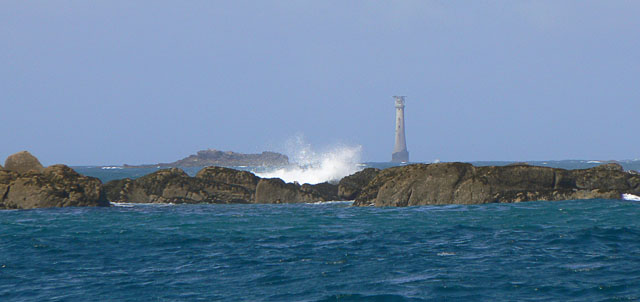
View of the Western Rocks with the Bishop Rock lighthouse

Unlike the rest of the islands, there is no evidence of any human occupation on the Western Rocks, apart from the Herbert salvage expedition in 1709 and 1710, and as a temporary worksite on Rosevear in the mid-nineteenth century.

Navigation, especially in cloudy weather, was often an informed guess based on assumed speed and direction. With a poor understanding of the sea current in the western approaches, which pushed sailing ships further north than expected, and the problem of pre-1750 charts showing the rocks ten miles further north than they actually are, it is not surprising that throughout history the Western Rocks have witnessed a great number of the shipwrecks recorded in the Isles of Scilly. Particularly the Gilstone Reef has been the cause of many maritime disasters, most notably the sinking of Admiral Sir Cloudesley Shovell's flagship HMS Association in the naval disaster of 1707 with the loss of over 1400 lives.

Seventy-seven years later, in 1784, the packet ship Nancy hit the Gilstone. Some of the crew and passengers took to a small boat which was dashed on to Rosevear, killing all those aboard. A total of 36 crew, 12 passengers, and one prisoner drowned, including the actress Ann Cargill. She was returning to England from India and her body was found clinging to a young child; they were buried on Rosevear along with other bodies found. She was later interred in the churchyard in Old Town on St Mary's.

In 1841 the captain of a paddle steamer SS Thames mistook the lighthouse on St Agnes for the Longships and changed course to head north. The vessel broke up sank in a strong NE gale off Jacky's Rock between Rosevear and Crebawethan. Sixty-two of the sixty-four passengers and crew drowned. Pilot gig Whale reached the wreck in heavy seas, saving three women. Her figurehead is in the Valhalla Museum at Tresco Abbey Gardens. The second known heaviest loss of life occurred in 1875 when the German liner the SS Schiller hit the Retarrier Ledges with the loss of 335 lives. Her captain knew she was near the Bishop Light but did not realise he was within the Western Rocks.

The various wrecks are popular diving sites for both commercial and amateur divers, with searches made to identify and record the wrecks.

== See also ==
- List of extreme points of the United Kingdom
