= Fairford (1782 EIC ship) =

History

Great Britain
- Name: Fairford
- Owner: George Ramsay
- Operator: East India Company
- Builder: Barnard, Deptford
- Fate: Burnt 15 June 1783

General characteristics
- Tons burthen: 755, or 790, or 7909/94 (bm)
- Length: Overall: 142 ft 5 in (43.4 m); Keel: 115 ft 1 3/4 in (35.1 m)
- Beam: 35 ft 11 in (10.9 m)
- Depth of hold: 14 ft 9 in (4.5 m)
- Notes: Three decks

Fairford was built by John Barnard at Barnard's Wharf in Rotherhithe and launched in January 1782. Captain John Haldane sailed from Gravesend on 2 May, bound for India. He stopped at Portsmouth where he waited for thee months. Fairford left Portsmouth on 11 September 1782 in company with General Goddard, General Coote, and several other East Indiamen. Fairford reached Bombay. She was loading cargo for England when she caught fire there on 15 June 1783. She was entirely consumed, but her crew was saved.

The Governor of the Bombay Presidency, William Hornby, gave Haldane command of the packet Nancy. Nancy was lost off the Isles of Scilly on 9 February 1784, or 24 February. Among those drowned were actress Ann Cargill and her young child; Cargill was Haldane's lover or wife.
