= General Goddard (ship) =

British East Indiaman and merchant ship (1782–1799)

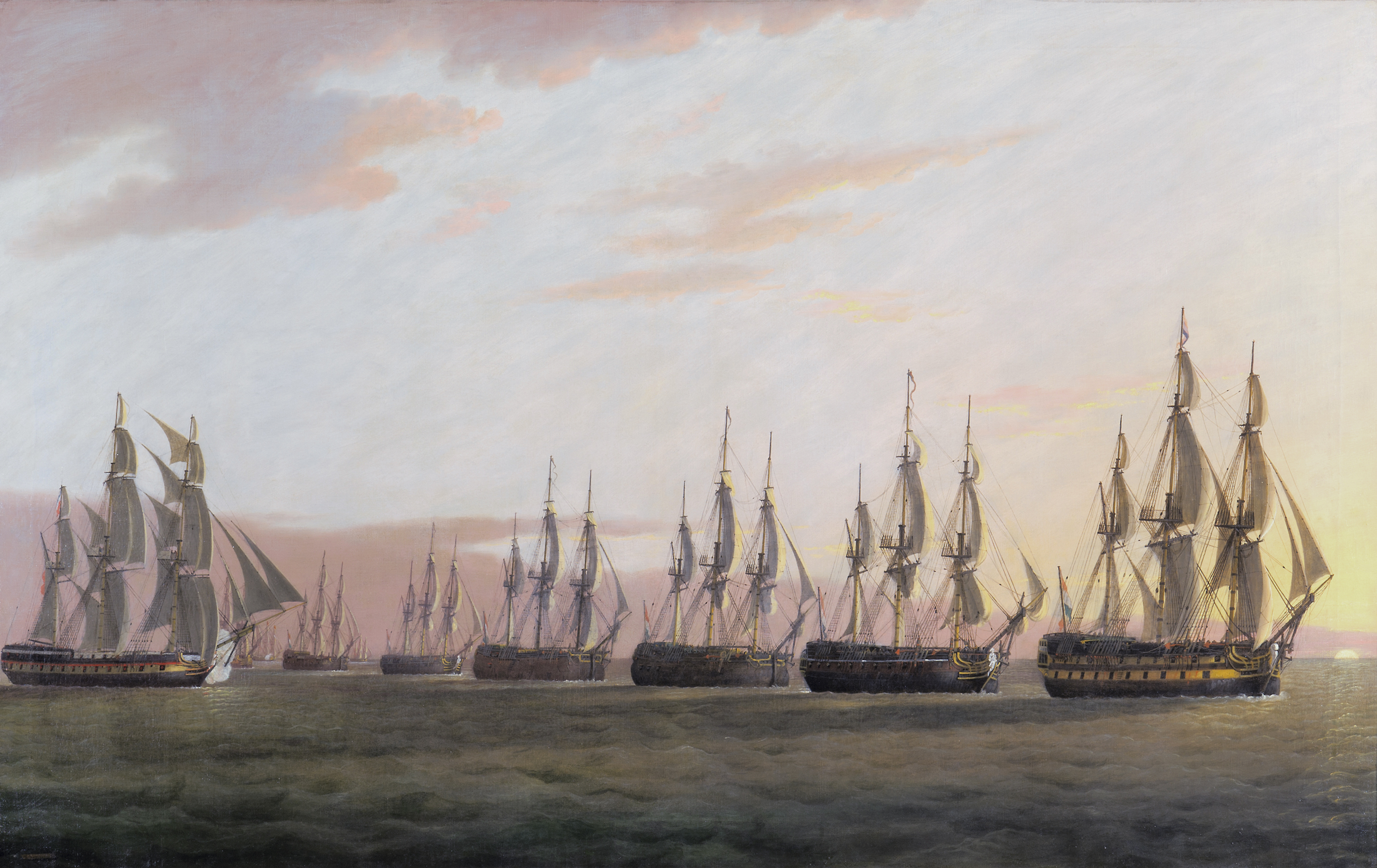
- Painting of General Goddard (first from left) attacking seven Dutch East Indiamen on 14 June 1795

History

Great Britain
- Name: General Goddard
- Namesake: General Thomas Wyndham Goddard, who played a major role in the First Anglo-Maratha War in 1780
- Owner: EIC Voyages 1 & 2: William Money; EIC Voyages 3-6: Robert Wigram (Note: Hardy has Wigram becoming her owner by the third voyage.)
- Builder: Randall
- Launched: 30 January 1782
- Captured: 15 November 1799

General characteristics
- Tons burthen: 79990/94 (bm)
- Length: 143 ft 10 in (43.8 m) (overall); 116 ft 7 in (35.5 m) (keel)
- Beam: 35 ft 11 in (10.9 m)
- Depth of hold: 14 ft 9 in (4.5 m)
- Sail plan: Full-rigged ship
- Complement: Voyages #1–6: 100 men; Voyage #7:50 men
- Armament: 1st Letter of Marque: 20 × 9-pounder guns; 2nd Letter of Marque: 26 × 9 & 4-pounder guns; 3rd Letter of Marque: 36 × 9 & 4-pounder guns; 4th Letter of Marque: 24 × 9 & 4-pounder guns; 20 × 9-pounder guns + 4 × 4-pounder guns

General Goddard was an East Indiaman launched in 1782 that made six voyages to the East Indies for the Honourable East India Company. After she was sold, she made one journey to the West Indies, where the Spanish captured her in November 1799. Her most notable exploit occurred on her fifth voyage, when she participated on 15 June 1795 in the capture of seven Dutch East Indiamen.

== Precautions ==
East Indiamen travelled in convoys as much as they could. Frequently these convoys had as escorts vessels of the British Royal Navy, though generally not past India, or before they were on the return leg. Even so, the Indiamen were heavily armed so that they could dissuade pirates and even large privateers.

Like many other East Indiamen during the French Revolutionary Wars, General Goddard sailed under letters of marque. These authorized her to take prizes should the opportunity arise.

== Voyage #1 (1782–1784) ==
Under the command of Captain Thomas Foxall, General Goddard left Portsmouth on 11 September 1782 in company with Fairford, General Coote, and several other East Indiamen.

General Goddard reached Madras on 16 April 1783. She reached Anjengo, at the southern tip of India on 22 October, and then Bombay on 9 November. In Bombay she took on board a part of the crew of the East Indiaman Resolution, which had been condemned in the East Indies. On her homeward-bound leg she reached St Helena on 9 August 1784 and arrived at the Downs on 24 October.

== Voyage #2 (1785–1787) ==
General Goddard, still under the command of Captain Thomas Foxall, left the Downs on 17 December 1785, reaching Madeira on 5 January 1786. From there she sailed to Johanna, in the Comorros Islands, arriving on 26 April, and Madras on 7 June. She then sailed for China, arriving at Malacca on 31 August and Whampoa on 5 October. On her return trip she crossed the Second Bar on 18 February 1787 and reached St Helena on 21 June. She then entered the Downs on 28 August.

== Voyage #3 (1789–1790) ==
General Goddard left the Downs on 26 February 1789 under the command of Captain Thomas Foxall. She reached Diamond Harbour (Calcutta) on 26 June. On her homeward leg, she touched in at Saugor on 27 November and Madras on 27 December. From there she reached St Helena on 18 March 1790. On 14 May she ran aground near the Brisou (Grange Chine), at the Isle of Wight. She was gotten off, but had extensive damage and 10 feet of water in her hold. Still she arrived in the Downs on 13 June.

== Voyage #4 (1792–1793) ==
For her fourth voyage, General Goddard was under the command of Captain Thomas Wakefield, with William Taylor Money as his first lieutenant. She left Portsmouth on 16 February 1792 and reached Simons Bay by 14 May. She then reached Diamond Harbour on 6 July. On her return voyage she arrived at Cox's Island on 3 December and sailed thence on 22 December. From there she sailed to St Helena, arriving 28 February 1793, and then on to the Downs, arriving 13 June. With war with France looming, General Goddard's first letter of marque was issued on 9 March 1793 to Captain Wakefield, presumably applied for by the HEIC in his absence.

== Voyage #5 and the capture of a Dutch fleet (1794–1795) ==
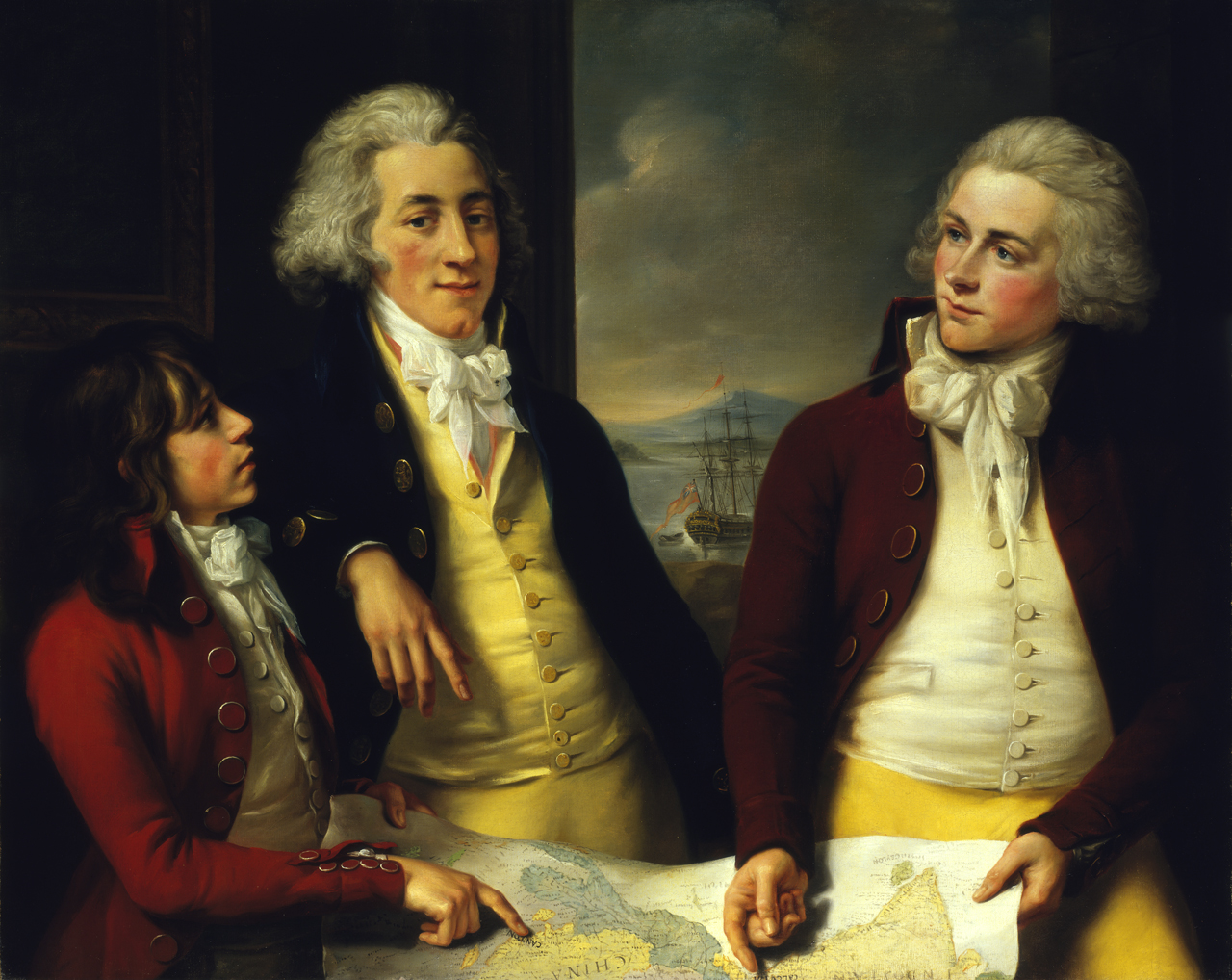
The Money Brothers, by John Francis Rigaud circa 1788–1792. William Taylor Money is the figure in the center. National Maritime Museum, Greenwich

The HEIC swore in William Taylor Money as a captain in their service on 16 October 1793. General Goddard's second letter of marque was issued to Money on 3 January 1794.

The British government held General Goddard at Portsmouth, together with a number of other Indiamen in anticipation of using them as transports for an attack on Île de France (Mauritius). It gave up the plan and released the vessels in May 1794. It paid £1,439 3s 4d for having delayed her departure by 71 days.

Money then sailed General Goddard from Portsmouth on 2 May 1794, reached Madras on 11 September, and arrived at Diamond Harbour on 10 October. Homeward bound, she was at Saugor on 19 December, Madras on 31 January 1795, and St Helena on 4 May.

While General Goddard was at St Helena, the 64-gun third rate HMS Sceptre, under the command of Captain William Essington, arrived with a convoy of HEIC ships sailing to India and China. She brought the news that France had invaded the Netherlands in January. Furthermore, under an order dated 9 February 1795, Royal Navy vessels and British letters of marque were instructed to detain Dutch vessels and cargoes and bring them into British ports that they might be detained provisionally. Then on 2 June the packet ship Swallow arrived from the Cape of Good Hope with the news than a convoy of Dutch East Indiamen had left the Cape, sailing for the Netherlands.

On 18 May 1795, the Dutch brig Komeet, under the command of Captain-Lieutenant Mynheer Claris, and the Dutch corvette Scipio, under the command of de Jong, set out from Table Bay with a convoy of sixteen East Indiamen, for Europe. Bad weather forced eight Indiamen back to the Cape. These eight sailed again on 22 May. The remaining eight Indiamen, which had sailed on 18 May together with their two escorts, and a private Dutch ship from the Cape, the whaler Herstilder, sailed on. All but two of this group reached ports in then-neutral Norway.

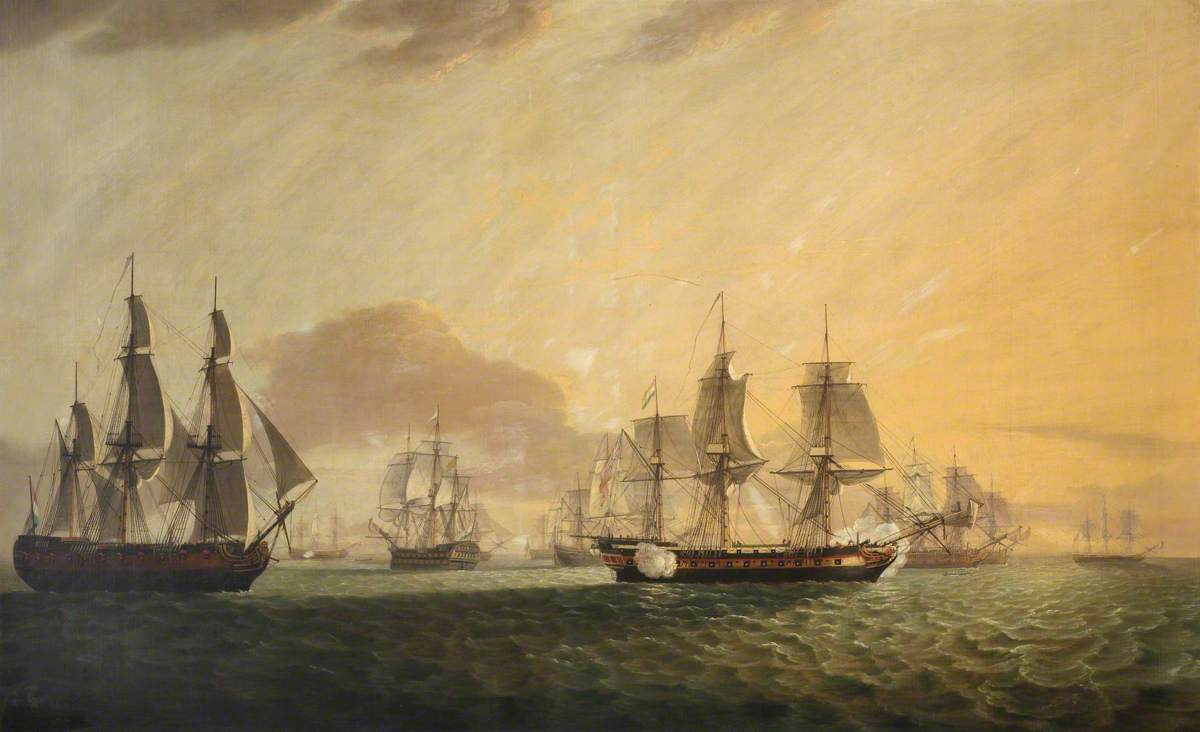
General Goddard, HMS Sceptre, and Swallow capturing Dutch East Indiamen, by Thomas Luny; National Maritime Museum

The eight unescorted Dutch East Indiaman that had sailed on 22 May encountered Sceptre, General Goddard, and Swallow near Saint Helena. Essington had prevailed upon Colonel Robert Brooke, the governor of St Helena, to lend him some troops and to put the HEIC vessels there at the time under his command to form a squadron to try and intercept the Dutch. On 3 June, Sceptre, General Goddard, Manship (also an HEIC ship), and Swallow set out. Five other HEIC ships set out later, of which only Busbridge met up with the squadron. On 7 June, the squadron captured the "richly laden" Julie. Three days later, the British captured the Dutch Indiaman Hougly, which Swallow escorted into St Helena, before returning to the squadron with additional seamen. Due to bad weather, Manship and Busbridge lost contact with Essington's squadron.

In the afternoon of 14 June, Essington's squadron sighted seven sail. At 1 a.m. the next morning General Goddard sailed through the Dutch fleet, which fired on her. She did not fire back. Later that morning, after some exchange of shots between the British and Dutch vessels, the Dutch surrendered. The HEIC ships Busbridge, Captain Samuel Maitland, and Asia, Captain John Davy Foulkes, arrived on the scene and helped board the Dutch vessels. There were no casualties on either side. The British then brought their prizes into St Helena on 17 June. Captain Money received the thanks of Captain Essington and a sword of honour from Colonel Brooke.

On 1 July, Sceptre, General Goddard and the prizes sailed from St Helena to gather in other returning British East Indiamen. They then returned to St Helena, where George Vancouver and Discovery, which had arrived there in the meantime, joined them. The entire convoy, now some 20 vessels or so strong, sailed from there on 22 August for Shannon, where most arrived on 13 December, though three were lost. General Goddard reached the Downs on 15 October.

Name	Launched	Tons burthen	Captain	Crew and passengers	Cargo value (Dutch Guilder)	Fate
Dordwijk (Dordrecht)	1787 for the Chamber of the VOC of Delft/Rotterdam	800	Hendrik Willem Ketjen	40	89,176	Sailed from Batavia 22 November 1794; after capture, damaged en route and broken up at Shannon
Hougly	1788	1150	Arnold Rogge		139,517	Abandoned and burnt 1 September after she became too leaky
Vrouw Agatha (Lady Agatha)	Hired by the Chamber of the VOC of Amsterdam	900	Herman Pieter Murk		115,960	Sailed from Batavia on 22 November 1794; prize
Mentor	1789 at the VOC yard at Zeeland for the Chamber of the VOC at Zeeland	560	Ulke Barendsz	50	61,361	Prize
Surcheance	1786 (purchased)	768	Christiaan Zummack		81,527	Sailed from Batavia on 22 November 1794; after capture lost on 5 September
Zeelelie	1789	1150	Kornelis Adriaansz		716,139	Wrecked off the Scilly Islands on 26 September due to the fault of the English prizemaster.
Alblasserdam	1782 at the VOC shipyard at Zeeland for the Chamber of the VOC at Zeeland	1150	Klaas Keuken	165 (one died on voyage between Batavia and the Cape, and 11 disembarked at the Cape	457,491	Prize
Meermin	1782 at the VOC shipyard at Amsterdam for the Chamber of the VOC at Amsterdam	500	Gerard Ewoud Overbeek	40	Wine and hides from the Cape	Sailed from Batavia in 1795; prize

Because the captures occurred before Britain had declared war on the Batavian Republic, the vessels became Droits to the Crown. Still, prize money, in the amount of two-thirds of the value of the Dutch ships amounted to £76,664 14s. Most of this money, £61,331 15s 2d, was distributed among the officers and crew of Sceptre, General Goddard, Busbridge, Asia, and Swallow. The remainder went to Colonel Brooke, the garrison at St Helena, and various vessels in the St Helena roads. Thirty-three years later, in July 1828, there was a small final payment. (Note: A first-class share was worth £4 3s 6d; a fourth-class share was worth 3s 1d.) (Note: The Maritime Museum Rotterdam (the Netherlands) holds another painting by Thomas Luny of the seizure. Head of Collections of the Maritime Museum Rotterdam, Jeroen ter Brugge, is preparing a publication on the subject that he will present in 2014 on the occasion of an exhibition on the decay of the Dutch East India Company.)

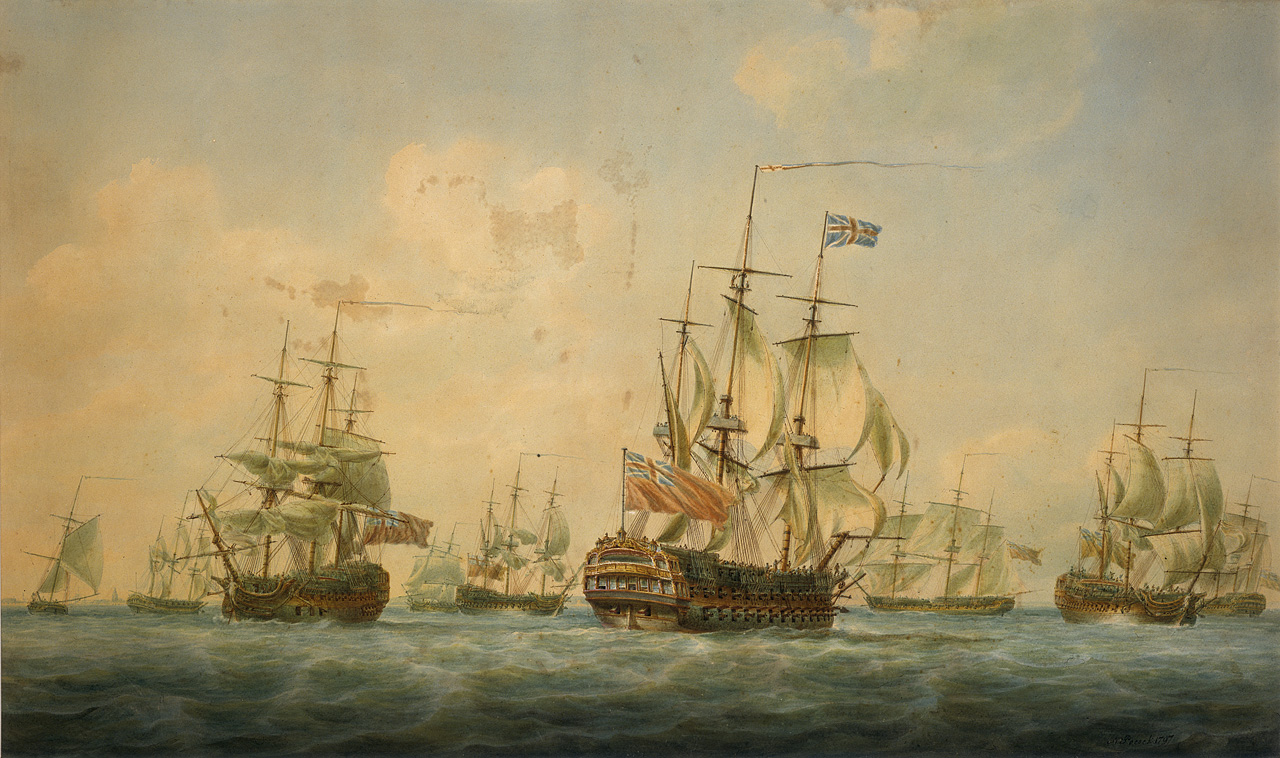
General Goddard (second from right) off Spithead in a 1797 Nicholas Pocock painting

== Voyage #6 (1796–1798) ==
General Goddard's third letter of marque was issued to Captain Thomas Graham on 23 February 1796. He sailed from Portsmouth on 12 April 1796, and reached Simons Bay on 22 July. From there General Goddard sailed to Madras, reaching there on 17 September. She took a detour to Trincomalee, which she reached on 28 December, before she returned to Madras on 5 January 1797. She then sailed up to Calcutta, reaching there on 28 February. She made a second loop, passing Kedgeree on 1 August on her way to Penang, which she reached on 24 August, before returning to Diamond Harbour on 30 October.

The reason for the to-and-fro was that the British government mounted an expedition against Manila in 1797–1798. (One of the Royal Navy vessels involved appears to have been HMS Sybille.) The EIC held several vessels in India to support the expedition. There were eight regular ships: Lord Camden, Busbridge, Minerva, Lord Macartney, Lord Hawkesbury, Sir Stephen Lushington, Phoenix, and General Goddard. There were also three "dismantled ships": Pitt, Lascalles, and Royal Admiral. The owners claimed demurrage; for General Goddard, the amount they claimed was £3,729 3s 4d for 179 days.

The captains of all the vessels sued the EIC for reimbursement for expenses consequent on the delay to their homeward bound journeys, and for the eight regular ships, the additional risks involved in the detours to Penang. In 1800 the court awarded six of the captains of the regular ships, Graham among them, £750 each. The court further ordered that the officers of the vessels involved receive some payment. General Goddard's officers received £250 in all. The chief mate (who had died in the interim), received £57 9s 5d, the purser £22 19s 9d, and the other officers intermediate amounts.

General Goddard sailed homeward bound, passing Saugor on 19 December and arriving at Madras again on 4 February 1798. From there she reached the Cape on 23 April, St Helena on 26 May, and the Downs on 2 August.

After General Goddard had returned to England in 1798, Robert Wigram sold her.

== Capture ==
J. Inglis purchased her and she became a storeship, with trade London - Jamaica. She also underwent a "good repair" in 1799. Captain John Bennett received a letter of marque on 11 June 1799.

In autumn 1799, General Goddard was part of a convoy that consisted of vessels from England and Cork, sailing to Jamaica under escort by the frigate Crescent and the sloop Calypso. The convoy was negotiating the Mona Passage and was 10 or 12 leagues (48 or 58 km) south-west of Puerto Rico on the morning of 15 November when it encountered a small Spanish squadron that was sailing from Santo Domingo to Havana.

The Spanish vessels consisted of the 64-gun ship Asia, Brigadier Don Francisco Montes, 40-gun frigate Anfitrite, Capitán de Fragata Don Diego Villagómez, and 16-gun ship-corvette Galgo Ingles, Teniente de Navío Don Josef de Arias. Captain W.G. Lobb of Crescent attempted to draw the Spanish vessels away from the convoy, and when that failed, he had the convoy disperse.

The two larger Spanish ships made for that part of the convoy with Calypso, but only captured General Goddard, nevertheless the most valuable ship in the convoy. She might well have evaded capture had General Goddard's master paid attention and followed the signals from the escorts. The Spaniards reached Havana on 16 December, having captured a schooner as well on the way. The value of their prizes, including the naval stores, which they found of great use, was 440,000 pesos. The Register of Shipping for 1800 has the annotation "captured" by General Goddard's name. The former East Indiaman would be the largest ship seized from the British by the Spanish through the entire conflict.

Galgo, which had left the Spanish squadron for the Havannah the day before (and thus took no direct part in the action), had the misfortune of being captured by the frigate Crescent. The rest of the convoy arrived safely at Port Royal Jamaica, some on 21 November with Calypso, and the remainder on 23 November with Crescent. The British took Galgo into service under her existing name. (Note: Galgo had only a brief career in the Royal Navy. She foundered in a squall on 9 October 1800, with the loss of her captain and much of her crew.)

Once at Havana, General Goddard was then placed under the command of alférez de navío José-Gregorio Zaldívar, who remained in command until 5 July 1800. She was then probably sold for break up.

== Commemorative stamp ==
On 17 December 1973, St Helena issued a 6p stamp to commemorate General Goddard's capture of the Dutch East Indiamen. See:
