= HMS Severn (1747) =

Ship of the line of the Royal Navy

History

Great Britain
- Name: HMS Severn
- Ordered: 17 March 1746
- Builder: John Barnard, Harwich
- Laid down: April 1746
- Launched: 10 July 1747
- Commissioned: July 1747
- In service: 1747-1749; 1752-1756
- Fate: Sold, Chatham Dockyard, 1759

General characteristics
- Class & type: 1745 Establishment 50-gun fourth rate ship of the line
- Length: 150 ft (45.7 m) (gundeck)
- Beam: 42 ft 8 in (13.0 m)
- Depth of hold: 18 ft 6 in (5.6 m)
- Propulsion: Sails
- Sail plan: Full-rigged ship
- Armament: 50 guns: Gundeck: 22 × 24 pdrs; Upper gundeck: 22 × 12 pdrs; Quarterdeck: 4 × 6 pdrs; Forecastle: 2 × 6 pdrs

HMS Severn was a 50-gun fourth rate ship of the line of the Royal Navy, built at King's Yard in Harwich by John Barnard as a sister ship to HMS Lichfield (1746) to the draught specified by the 1745 Establishment, and launched on 10 July 1747.

Severn served until 1759, when she was sold out of the navy for only £74.
