= General Coote (1781 EIC ship) =

East Indiaman (1781-1797)

History

Great Britain
- Name: General Coote
- Namesake: General Eyre Coote
- Owner: Robert Williams
- Operator: East India Company
- Builder: Barnard
- Launched: 1781
- Fate: Sold 1797

General characteristics
- Tons burthen: 755, or 75776/94, or 787 (bm)
- Length: Overall: 142 ft 2 in (43.3 m); Keel: 114 ft 9 3/4 in (35.0 m)
- Beam: 35 ft 11 in (10.9 m)
- Depth of hold: 14 ft 9 in (4.5 m)
- Complement: 100
- Armament: 26 × 12&6-pounder guns

General Coote was built by John Barnard probably at Barnard's Wharf in Rotherhithe and launched in 1781 or 1782 as an East Indiaman. Between 1782 and 1797 she made six voyages to India or China for the British East India Company (EIC). On the last voyage she participated as a transport in a campaign. She was sold in 1797.

== Career ==
1st EIC voyage (1782–1784): Captain Daniel Griffith Hoare sailed from Gravesend on 7 May 1782 and arrived at Portsmouth on 23 May, from Sunderland. She sailed from Portsmouth on 11 September 1782, bound for Madras and China, and in company with Fairford, General Goddard, and several other East Indiamen. General Coote reached Madras on 9 April 1783 Madras and Malacca on 6 September; she arrived at Whampoa Anchorage on 7 October.

At Madras there had been cargo destined for China that had belonged to Latham, Fortitude, and Earl of Hertford. (Earl of Hertford had foundered at Madras on 15 October 1782.) General Coote, Francis, and Montague carried the cargo to Canton.

Homeward bound, General Coote crossed the Second Bar on 23 December, reached St Helena on 24 April 1784, and arrived back at the Downs on 13 July. When she arrived at St Helena the name of her master was reported as Farrington. William Farrington had been Hoare's First Lieutenant.

2nd EIC voyage (1785–1786): Captain James Baldwin sailed from the Downs on 1 February 1785 bound for St Helena and China. General Coote reached St Helena on 18 May and arrived at Whampoa on 1 October. Homeward bound, she crossed the Second Bar on 2 February 1786, reached St Helena on 4 June, and arrived at the Downs on 13 August.

3rd EIC voyage (1788–1789): Captain James Baldwin sailed from the Downs on 9 March 1788 bound for Madras and China. General Coote reached Madras on 15 July and Malacca on 18 September; she arrived at Whampoa on 17 October. Homeward bound, she crossed the Second Bar on 4 February 1789, reached St Helena on 4 June, and arrived at the Downs on 16 August.

4th EIC voyage (1791–1792): Captain James Baldwin sailed from Torbay on 1 February 1791 bound for Madras and China. General Coote reached Madras on 29 May and Penang on 27 July; she arrived at Whampoa on 13 September. She crossed the Second Bar on 23 November, reached St Helena on 25 February 1792, and arrived at the Downs on 14 April.

5th EIC voyage (1793–1794): Captain Robert Williams sailed from Portsmouth on 7 July 1793, bound for Madras and Bengal. General Coote reached the Cape on 18 September and Madras on 2 November. She was at Diamond Harbour on 29 January 1794 and Cox's Island on 25 February. She reached St Helena on 17 June and arrived at the Downs on 7 September.

6th EIC voyage (1795–1797): Captain Charles Dundas (or Dunbar), acquired a letter of marque on 3 April 1795. He sailed from Portsmouth on 13 May, bound for China. General Coote was part of a convoy of Indiamen that were bringing General Alured Clarke and his troops for the invasion of the Cape Colony.

General Coote and the fleet arrived at All Saints Bay (St Salvadore) on 7 July.

General Coote and the fleet reached Simon's Bay on 3–4 September, and the Cape on 2 October. From there General Coote sailed to Balambang, which she reached on 20 December; she arrived at Whampoa on 5 March 1796. Homeward bound, she crossed the Second Bar on 22 June, reached St Helena on 20 November, and arrived at the Downs on 14 February 1797.

== Fate ==
General Coote was sold at Lloyd's Coffee House 31 May 1797.
