= Earl of Hertford (1781 EIC ship) =

History

Great Britain
- Name: Earl of Hertford
- Namesake: Marquess of Hertford
- Owner: Charles Foulis
- Operator: East India Company
- Builder: Perry, Blackwall
- Launched: 13 March 1781
- Fate: Foundered at Madras Roads on 15 October 1782

General characteristics
- Tons burthen: 758, or 807, or 80783/94, (bm)
- Length: Overall: 143 ft 3 in (43.7 m); Keel: 115 ft 7 in (35.2 m)
- Beam: 36 ft 3 in (11.0 m)
- Depth of hold: 15 ft 0 in (4.6 m)
- Notes: Three decks

Earl of Hertford was launched on the River Thames in 1781. Captain Daniel Clarke sailed from Gravesend on 6 May, bound for India and stopped at Portsmouth on 18 May. She sailed from Portsmouth on 11 June. She stopped at Saint Helena and then arrived at Madras. She foundered at Madras Roads on 15 October 1782 in a monsoon while she lay at anchor.

Earl of Hertford had been carrying cargo destined for China. At Madras these was also other cargo destined for China that had belonged to Latham and Fortitude General Coote, Francis, and Montague carried the cargo to Canton.
