= George Mattocks =

English actor and opera singer (died 1804)

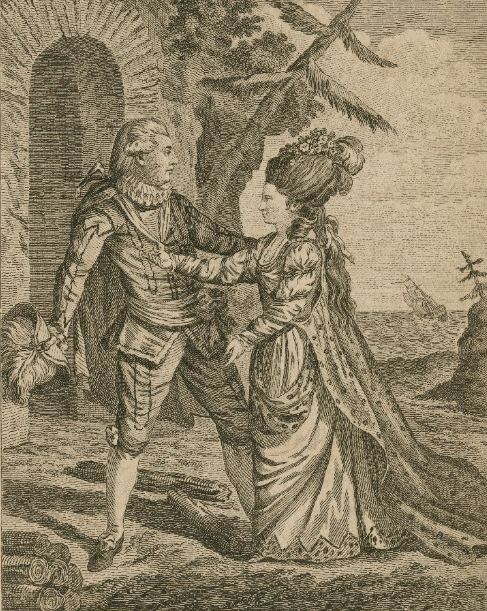
Performing as Ferdinand in The Tempest with Ann Cargill

George Mattocks, also known as George Maddox, (1734 or 1735 – August 14, 1804) was a British stage actor and operatic tenor.

== Life and career ==
George Mattocks was born in England in either 1734 or 1735. He appeared at Southwark Fair in 1747 as a child performer and the following year appeared at Bartholomew Fair. Originally billed as George Maddox when he started at Drury Lane he soon altered the spelling of his name and was a regular member of the company from 1749 to 1752, also appearing at Richmond Theatre. At Drury Lane he notably created the role of Palaemon the premiere of William Boyce’s The Chaplet (1749).

He was absent from the London stage for several years, appearing at Bristol's Jacobs Well Theatre before returning to join the Covent Garden company in 1757. He remained at the theatre for the next twenty five years, particularly appearing in ballad operas and other musical events, some straight comedy but almost never tragedies. In 1762 he was featured as Rimenes in the premiere of Thomas Arne's opera Artaxerxes, and that same year performed the role of Thomas Meadows in the premiere of Arne's Love in a Village. He also created roles in the premieres of Samuel Arnold's The Maid of the Mill (1765, as Lord Aimsworth) and Don Ferdinand in The Duenna (1775).

By 1760, Mattocks had become the lieutenant of Madame Capte Deville, the manager of Plymouth's summer company. A year later, he bought half of Plymouth's Franfkford Gate Theatre and managed it until 1763. This was where he hired John and Ann Barrington as well the actress Isabella Hallam, who grew up with their family.

In 1765, he married actress and opera singer Isabella Hallam, who was afterwards billed Isabella Mattocks. Because he had previously had two children with the actress Harriet Pitt, her Isabella's guardians were opposed to the marriage so they eloped to France. Mattocks had his first acting appearance in Liverpool at the Drury Lane Theatre in 1767.

One of his final parts at Covent Garden was in John O'Keeffe's The Castle of Andalusia in 1782. He had continued to tour Britain in the summer, and was particularly associated with Liverpool and later Edinburgh, where he was stage director during his final years. Around 1784, he was identified as a co-partner of Joseph Younger in the management of the Theatre Royal Liverpool.

Mattocks died in Edinburgh on August 14, 1804.

== Bibliography ==
- Gilman, Todd. The Theatre Career of Thomas Arne. Rowman & Littlefield, 2013.
- Highfill, Philip H, Burnim, Kalman A. & Langhans, Edward A. A Biographical Dictionary of Actors, Actresses, Musicians, Dancers, Managers, and Other Stage Personnel in London, 1660–1800: Volume 4. SIU Press, 1975.
