= John Barnard (shipbuilder) =

English shipbuilder

John Barnard (1705 – 8 October 1784) was an English shipbuilder who built ships for the Royal Navy.

== Life ==
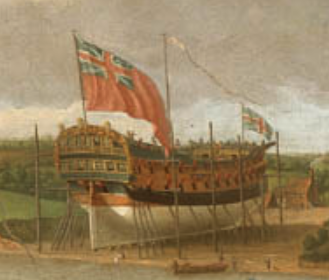
HMS Hampshire under construction at Ipswich

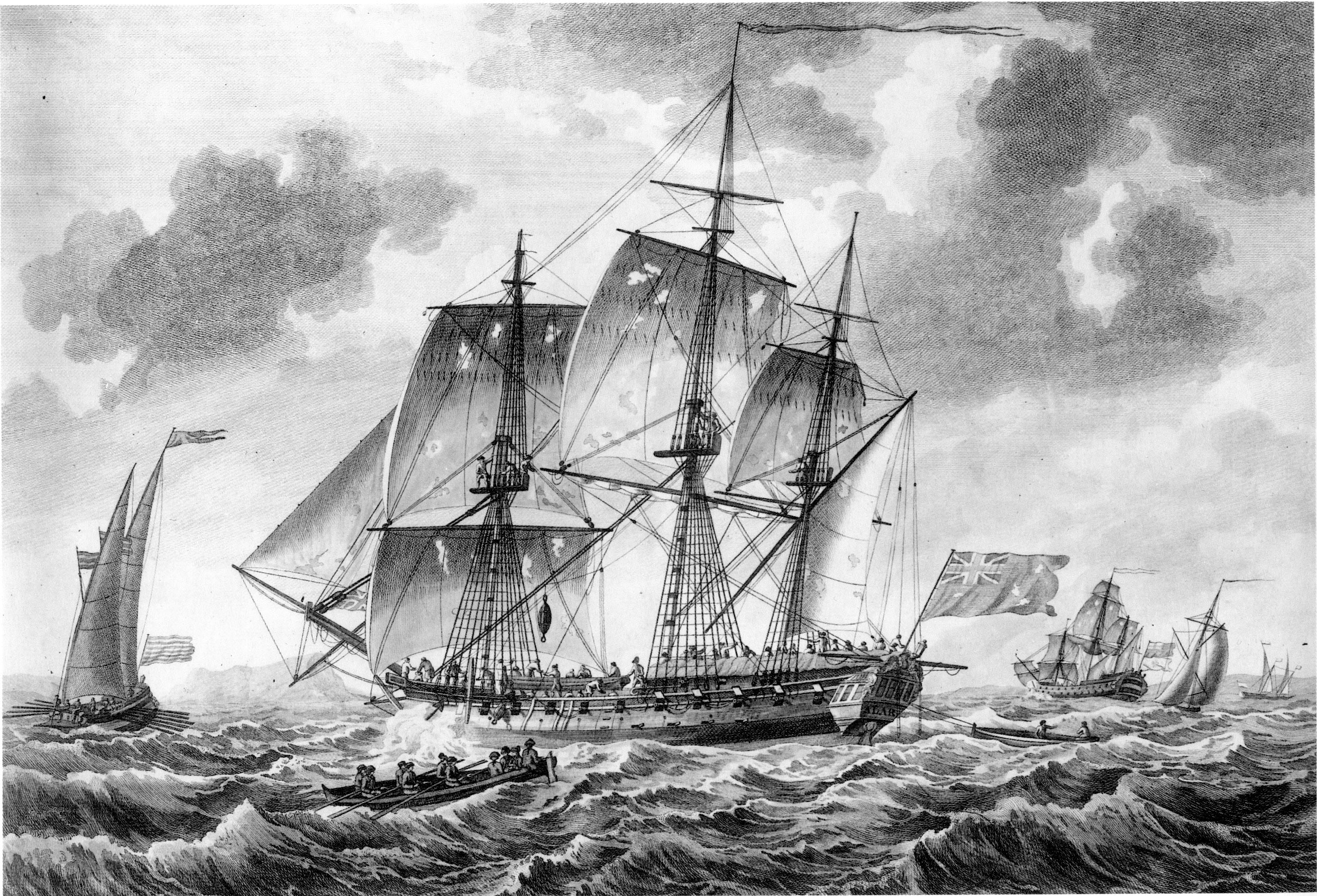
HMS Alarm at sea

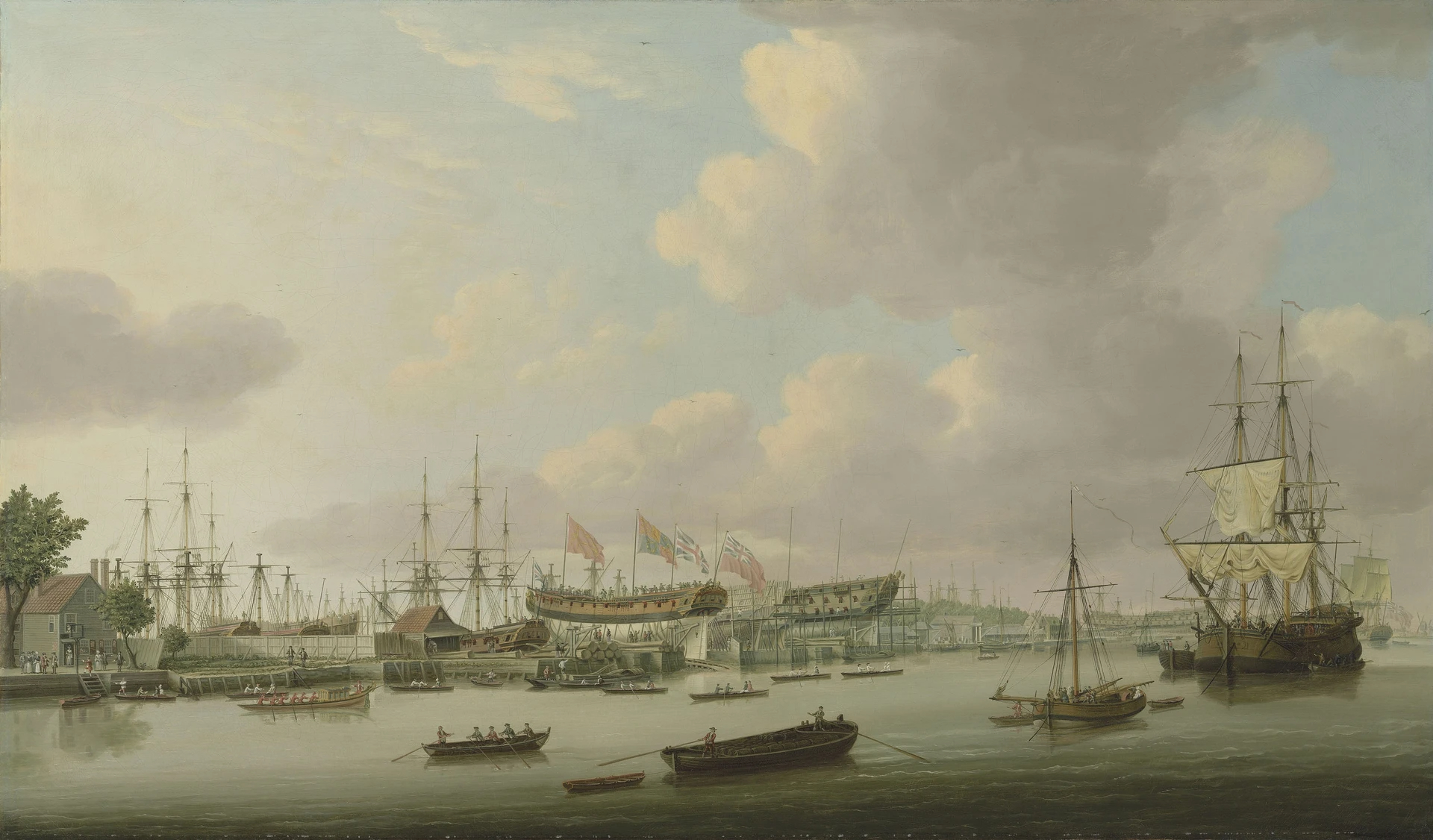
Ambuscade (centre) on the stocks at the Isle of Dogs in September 1773

He was born in 1705 the son of John Barnard a shipwright in Ipswich (1665-1716) and his wife Mary (1668-1734).

His father died before he began his apprenticeship but would standardly have joined a ship as a carpenter's apprentice at age 14 and served 7 years on ship before beginning shipbuilding on shore.

From 1733 he was employed at St Clement's Yard in Ipswich, but is only formally listed as a Royal Navy employee from April 1740 when as a Master Shipwright he launched HMS Bideford. In October 1742 he relocated to Harwich Dockyard. In 1773 he opened a secondary yard known as Barnard's Thames Yard at Deptford.

also dabbled in design, creating the Zephyr class in 1778/9. Barnard appears to have gone bankrupt in 1781. This could be the result of under-pricing on a single ship. Inflation in Great Britain was unusually high (at around 13%) in 1780, and this would also cause problems on keeping to a stated contract price on a job which often took two or three years to complete. His bankruptcy coincides with his beginning to work for the East India Company but it is unclear if this was part of the cause or part of the solution. He also had opened a third yard (almost certainly with his own finance rather than funded by the Royal Navy) at Rotherhithe around 1780. This would have been a considerable expense.

He retired in December 1782 aged 77 and died in Deptford on 8 October 1784.

== Family ==
In 1728 he married Anne Notcutt. They were parents to William Barnard who continued the shipbuilding yard.

== Ships of Note ==
- HMS Bideford a 20-gun ship launched at St Clement's Yard in Ipswich in 1740
- HMS Hampshire a 50-gun ship of the line launched at John's Ness in Ipswich in 1741
- "Granado" an 8-gun bomb vessel launched at St Clement's Yard, Ipswich in 1742
- HMS Harwich a 50-gun ship of the line launched at King's Yard in Harwich in 1743
- HMS Colchester a 50-gun ship of the line launched at King's Yard in Harwich in 1744 as a sister ship to HMS Harwich
- HMS Eagle a 60-gun ship of the line launched at King's Yard in Harwich in 1745
- HMS Lichfield a 50-gun ship of the line launched at King's Yard in Harwich in 1746
- HMS Severn a 50-gun ship of the line launched at King's Yard in Harwich in 1747 as a sister ship to HMS Lichfield
- HMS Seahorse a 24-gun frigate launched at King's Yard in Harwich in 1748
- HMS Mercury a 20-gun ship launched at King's Yard in Harwich in 1756
- HMS Achilles a 60-gun ship of the line launched at King's Yard in Harwich in 1756/7
- HMS Vestal a 32-gun frigate launched at King's Yard in Harwich in 1757
- HMS Conqueror a 68-gun ship of the line launched at King's Yard in Harwich in 1758
- HMS Alarm a 32-gun frigate launched at King's Yard in Harwich in 1758
- HMS Quebec a 32-gun frigate launched at King's Yard in Harwich in 1760
- HMS Arrogant a 74-gun ship of the line launched at King's Yard in Harwich in 1761
- HMS Terrible a 74-gun ship of the line launched at King's Yard in Harwich in 1762 as a sister ship to HMS Arrogant
- HMS Robust a 74-gun ship of the line launched at King's Yard in Harwich in 1764
- HMS Orpheus a 32-gun frigate launched at King's Yard in Harwich in 1773
- HMS Ambuscade a 32-gun frigate launched at Barnard's Thames Yard at Deptford in 1773
- HMS Centurion a 50-gun ship of the line launched at King's Yard in Harwich in 1774
- HMS Experiment a 50-gun ship of the line launched at Barnard's Thames Yard at Deptford in 1774
- HMS Cormorant a 14-gun sloop launched at the Nova Scotia Yard at Ipswich in 1776
- HMS Zebra a 14-gun sloop launched at the Nova Scotia Yard at Ipswich in 1776
- HMS Proserpine a 28-gun frigate launched at King's Yard in Harwich in 1777
- HMS Savage a 14-gun sloop launched at Nova Scotia Yard in Ipswich in 1778
- HMS Charon a 44-gun ship of the line launched at King's Yard in Harwich in 1778
- HMS Champion a 24-gun post ship launched at John's Ness in Ipswich in 1779
- HMS Pandora a 24-gun post ship launched at Barnard's Thames Yard at Deptford in 1779
- HMS Zephyr a 14-gun sloop launched at Barnard's Thames Yard at Deptford in 1779
- HMS Inflexible a 64-gun ship of the line launched at King's Yard in Harwich in 1780
- Dutton for the East India Company launched at Barnard's Thames Yard at Deptford in 1781
- Fairford for the East India Company launched at Barnard's Wharf at Rotherhithe in 1782
- General Coote for the East India Company probably launched at Barnard's Wharf in Rotherhithe in 1782
- HMS Irresistible a 74-gun ship of the line launched at King's Yard in Harwich in 1782
