= William Lisle (Royal Navy officer) =

Royal Navy officer

Commodore William Lisle
- Died: 26 January 1752
- Military career
- Allegiance: Kingdom of Great Britain
- Branch: Royal Navy
- Rank: Commodore
- Commands: HMS Severn; HMS Vigilant; East Indies Station
- Conflicts: War of Jenkins' Ear

Commodore William Lisle (died 26 January 1752) was a Royal Navy officer who served as Commander-in-Chief of the East Indies Station.

== Naval career ==
He was made Lieutenant on 16 January 1728 and Captain on 28 May 1740.

Lisle was given command of HMS Severn and saw action when escorting a convoy in the Leeward Islands in 1746. None of the ships in the convoy were taken by the attacking French force and Lisle's conduct was such that he was rewarded with the command of HMS Vigilant in 1747, retaining it as his flagship for his deployment to the East Indies. He was appointed Commander-in-Chief of the East Indies Station in 1750 and remained in post until 1752.

He died on 26 January 1752.
