= Nancy (1774 EIC ship) =

Schooner or ship

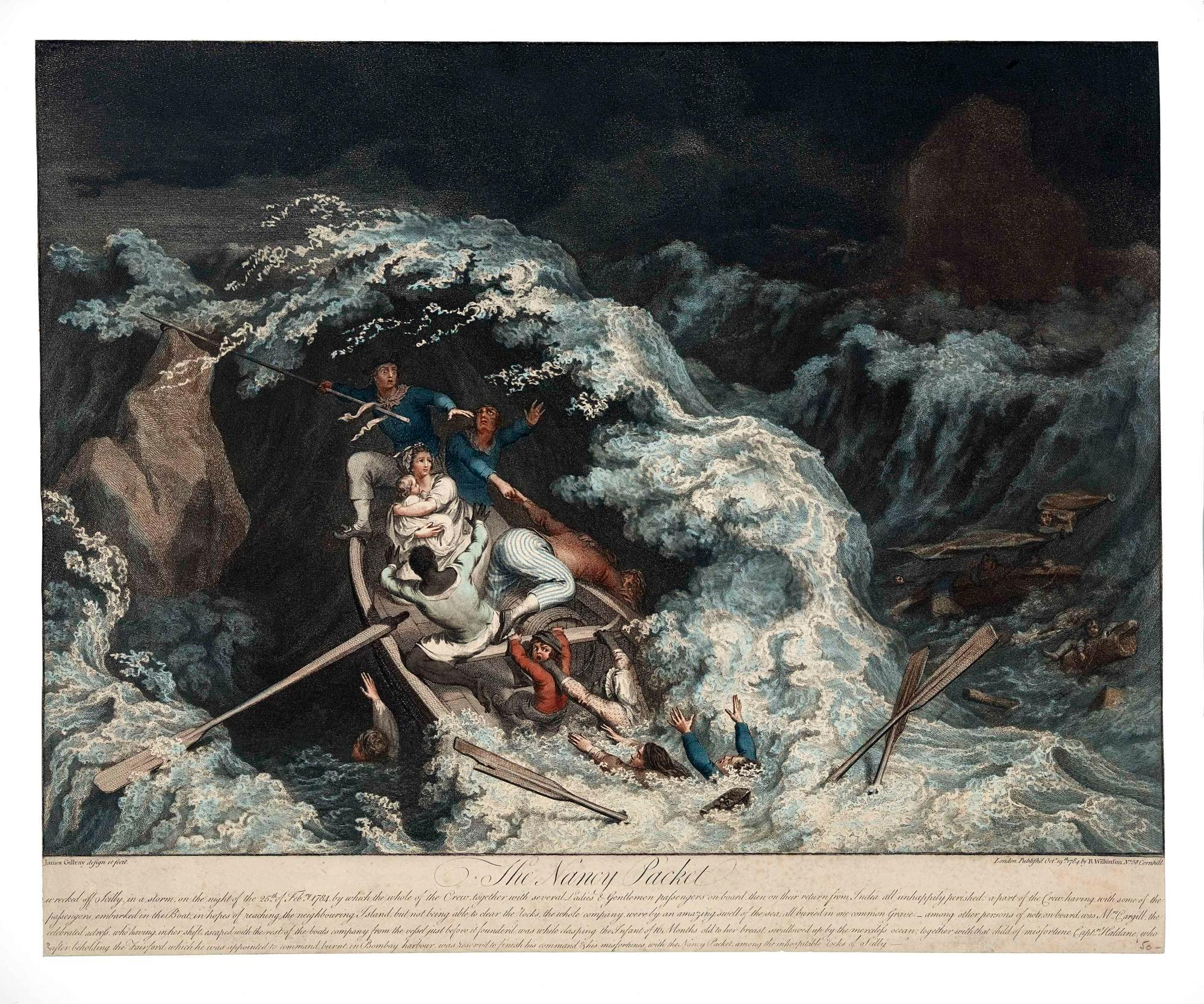
- The Nancy wrecking off Rosvear Island. Ann Cargill and some of the crew coming to grief.

History

United Kingdom
- Name: Nancy
- Owner: British East India Company
- Builder: Bombay Dockyard
- Launched: 21 September 1774
- Acquired: 1778
- Fate: Wrecked February 1784

General characteristics
- Tons burthen: 150, or 240 (bm)
- Sail plan: Possibly schooner, or ship
- Complement: 36 (at loss)

Nancy was a schooner or ship launched at Bombay. In 1778 the British East India Company (EIC) government at Bengal acquired her to use as a warship at Calcutta. The EIC Board of Governors in London vetoed the idea and Nancy became an express packet ship. She made two voyages from Bengal to Ireland between 1782 and 1784, and was wrecked on the second of these.

== Career ==
Warren Hastings, Governor-General of Bengal wanted to create a small navy at Calcutta like the EIC's Bombay Marine, in order to combat pirates and French privateers. He acquired four vessels, the smallest of which was Nancy. Captain Heffernan was appointed her captain. Reportedly, Heffernan retired and sailed to Cork in 1781.

When the Board of Governors of the EIC in London vetoed the project the EIC decided to use Nancy as an express packet. She sailed from Bengal on 1 March 1782 under the command of Captain George Hifferman, and arrived at Cork on 15 July 1782. Records in the British Library state that Captain John Haldane left India on 1 April 1782, and left Cork on 19 January 1783. Hardy's information agrees that Nancy left Cork on 19 January 1783 bound for Bengal and under the command of Captain Haldane. (Note: Haldane had been captain of Fairford, which had burnt in Bombay harbour on 15 June 1783.)

== Loss ==
Nancy was lost off the Isles of Scilly on 9 February 1784, or 24 February.

Nancy struck the Gilstone in the Western Rocks and sank in deeper water near Rosevear Ledges. When she sank, she was carrying actress Ann Cargill and her young child; Cargill was Haldane's lover or wife. Some of the crew and passengers took to a small boat that was dashed on Rosevear killing all aboard. In total 36 crew, 12 passengers, and 1 prisoner drowned.

== Post-script ==
In 2008 the Islands Maritime Archaeological Group (IMAG) fortuitously found what they believe is the wreck site, east of the Rosevear Ledges.
