= William Essington =

Vice-Admiral Sir William Essington KCB
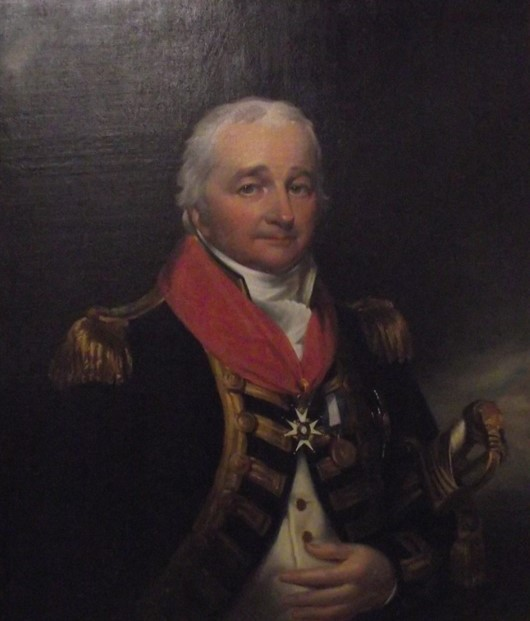
- 1809 portrait by John James Halls
- Born: c. 1753
- Died: 12 July 1816; Nottingham Place
- Military career
- Allegiance: United Kingdom of Great Britain and Ireland
- Branch: Royal Navy
- Rank: Vice-Admiral
- Commands: HMS Aurora; HMS Sceptre; HMS Triumph; HMS Goliath; HMS Sans Pareil
- Conflicts: French Revolutionary Wars; Battle of Camperdown; Napoleonic Wars; Battle of Copenhagen
- Awards: Knight Commander of the Order of the Bath

Vice-Admiral Sir William Essington KCB (c. 1753 – 12 July 1816) was an officer in the Royal Navy during the American War of Independence and the French Revolutionary and Napoleonic Wars.

On 15 June 1795, he was in command of Sceptre at Saint Helena. There, with the assistance of several East Indiamen, primarily the General Goddard, he captured eight Dutch East Indiamen on their way back to Europe.

Essington replaced Erasmus Gower as captain of HMS Triumph on 4 June 1797. Phillip Parker King named Port Essington, an inlet in Australia's Northern Territory, after Essington in 1803. On 23 April 1804, Essington was knighted and promoted to Rear Admiral of the Blue. He was present at the Battle of Copenhagen in 1807, flying his flag aboard HMS Minotaur. He died at Nottingham Place on 12 July 1816 at the age of 63, with the rank of vice-admiral.
