= Matthew Barton (Royal Navy officer) =

Royal Navy Admiral (c. 1715–1795)

Admiral Matthew Barton
- Born: 2 August 1716; Rushton, Northamptonshire
- Died: 1795
- Burial place: St. Andrew's, Holborn
- Military career
- Allegiance: Great Britain
- Branch: Royal Navy
- Service years: 1730-1763
- Rank: Admiral
- Commands: HMS Duke; HMS Antelope; HMS Postilion; HMS Lichfield; HMS Temeraire
- Conflicts: War of Jenkins' Ear; Battle of Cartagena de Indias; War of the Austrian Succession; Battle of Toulon; Seven Years' War; Capture of Belle Île; British expedition against Martinique; Battle of Havana

Admiral Matthew Barton (2 August 1716 – 1795) was an officer of the Royal Navy. He rose to the rank of admiral during a long and distinguished career, in which he served in the War of Jenkins' Ear, the War of the Austrian Succession and the Seven Years' War. He fought at several major battles, and commanded a number of amphibious assaults off the French coast and in the West Indies. Though he lived until 1795 his health was broken after service in the tropics, and he never served at sea again after 1763.

== Early career ==
Barton was the seventh son of Geoffrey Barton, rector of Rushton, Northamptonshire and his wife, Elizabeth. He was born in Rushton, in August 1716.

Barton entered the navy in 1730, on board the Fox, under the command of Captain Arnold, and served with him on the coast of South Carolina. Afterwards he served in the Mediterranean under Captains John Byng, Philip VanBrugh, and Lord Augustus Fitzroy, as a midshipman.

== From lieutenant to admiral ==
In March 1739, being then a midshipman of HMS Somerset, he was made lieutenant in the prize ship St. Joseph by Admiral Nicholas Haddock. He was then appointed to the 70-gun HMS Lenox, and was engaged in her in the capture of the Princesa on 18 April 1740. In October he was transferred to the 80-gun HMS Princess Caroline, commanded by Captain Griffin, forming part of the fleet which sailed with Sir Chaloner Ogle for the West Indies. On arriving at Jamaica, Admiral Edward Vernon selected the Princess Caroline for his flag, and Captain Griffin was removed to HMS Burford, taking Lieutenant Barton with him.

=== From the Mediterranean to Africa ===
After the failure at Cartagena the Burford came home and paid off. Barton was appointed to the 50-gun HMS Nonsuch, in which ship he went to the Mediterranean and continued till after the battle off Toulon, 11 February 1743–4, when, in September, he was appointed to HMS Marlborough, and a few months later to HMS Neptune, carrying the flag of Vice-Admiral William Rowley, the commander-in-chief, by whom, in May 1745, he was promoted to the command of the fireship HMS Duke; and in February 1746–7 he was further promoted by Vice-Admiral Henry Medley to the frigate HMS Antelope. In that, and afterwards in the xebec HMS Postilion, he remained in the Mediterranean till the peace, when the Postilion was paid off at Port Mahon, and Barton returned to England in the flagship with Vice-Admiral Byng. He had no further employment at sea till the recommencement of the war with France, when he was appointed to the 50-gun HMS Lichfield, one of the fleet which went to North America with Edward Boscawen in the summer of 1755, and which, off Louisbourg, in June 1756, captured the French 50-gun ship, Arc-en-Ciel, armed en flûte, and carrying stores. The next year he was senior officer on the coast of Guinea, and, having crossed over to the Leeward Islands, brought home a large convoy in August 1758.

The Lichfield was then placed under the orders of Commodore Augustus Keppel, as part of the squadron destined for the capture of Gorée, and sailed with it on 11 November. On the 28th a heavy gale scattered the fleet; at night, the Lichfield by her reckoning was twenty-five leagues from the African shore. At six o'clock on the following morning she struck on the coast near Masagan; it was rocky and rugged; the sea was extremely high, and swept over the wreck, which beat violently, but by good fortune held together till the gale moderated, when those who had not been washed overboard or drowned in premature attempts, managed to reach the shore, distant only about 400 yards; the saved amounted to 220 out of a crew of 350. These survivors, naked and starving, were made prisoners by the Emperor of Morocco, and kept for a period of eighteen months in semi-slavery. After a tedious negotiation they were at last ransomed by the British government, and arrived at Gibraltar on 27 June 1760.

=== To Jamaica ===
Captain Barton arrived in England on 7 August, was tried for the loss of his ship, was fully acquitted, and in October was appointed to the 74-gun HMS Temeraire, captured from the French only the year before. In this ship he served, under Commodore Keppel, in the expedition against Belle-Isle in April 1761, had especial charge of the landing, and was sent home with despatches. He afterwards convoyed a number of transports to Barbados, and served under Sir George Rodney at the reduction of Martinique, January 1762. In the following March he was detached, under Commodore Sir James Douglas, to Jamaica, and formed part of the expedition against Havana in June and July, during a great part of which time he commanded the naval brigade on shore.

=== Retirement ===
Under the stress of fatigue and climate his health gave way, and he was compelled to exchange into HMS Devonshire for a passage to England, which was not, however, put out of commission till the peace. He attained his flag on 28 April 1777, became vice-admiral on 19 March 1779, and admiral on 24 September 1787. He died in 1795; but during his last thirty-two years his health, affected by Yellow fever, did not permit him to accept any active command. He was buried at St. Andrew's, Holborn on 6 January 1796.

== Bibliography ==
This article incorporates text from a publication now in the public domain: Stephen, Leslie, ed. (1885). "Barton, Matthew". Dictionary of National Biography. Vol. 3. London: Smith, Elder & Co.
