= HMS Lichfield (1746) =

Ship of the line of the Royal Navy

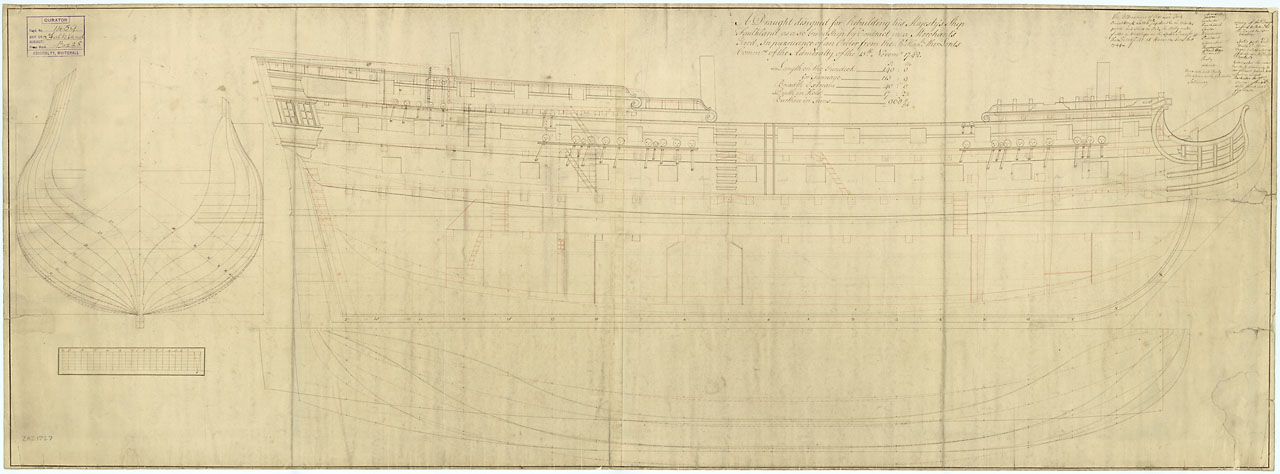
- Litchfield

History

Great Britain
- Name: HMS Lichfield
- Ordered: 1 June 1744
- Builder: John Barnard, Harwich
- Launched: 26 June 1746
- Fate: Wrecked, 1758

General characteristics
- Class & type: 1741 proposals 50-gun fourth rate ship of the line
- Tons burthen: 97919/94 (bm)
- Length: 140 ft (42.7 m) (gundeck)
- Beam: 40 ft (12.2 m)
- Depth of hold: 17 ft 2 1/2 in (5.2 m)
- Propulsion: Sails
- Sail plan: Full-rigged ship
- Armament: 50 guns: Gundeck: 22 × 24 pdrs; Upper gundeck: 22 × 12 pdrs; Quarterdeck: 4 × 6 pdrs; Forecastle: 2 × 6 pdrs

HMS Lichfield was a 50-gun fourth rate ship of the line of the Royal Navy, built at King's Yard in Harwich by John Barnard to the dimensions laid down in the 1741 proposals of the 1719 Establishment, and launched on 26 June 1746. She was wrecked on the Barbary Coast of North Africa on 28 November 1758.

== Career ==
Lichfield was built as a replacement to the previous HMS Lichfield which had been broken up in 1744, and used some of the timbers from that vessel. In June 1756, under Captain Matthew Barton, Lichfield captured the French ship of the line Arc-en-Ciel off Louisbourg, Nova Scotia during the Seven Years' War.

In November 1758 Lichfield, was assigned to a squadron under the command of Commodore Augustus Keppel, with orders to transport troops to West Africa to capture the island of Gorée from the French. The ship left Cork Harbour, Ireland on 11 November 1758 along with four larger ships of the line, and six smaller vessels. (Note: The ships in the squadron were Torbay (80), Nassau (70), Fougueux (64), Dunkirk (60), Lichfield (50), Prince Edward (44), Experiment (24), Roman Emperor (8) (fireship), Saltash (14), and the bomb vessels Firedrake (12) and Furnace (8).)

Lichfield was assigned to lead the squadron. At nightfall on the sixteenth day at sea her sailing master estimated their position as being around 350 miles (563.3 kilometres) from shore. This proved to be incorrect, as at dawn the following morning Lichfield ran aground on the Barbary Coast.

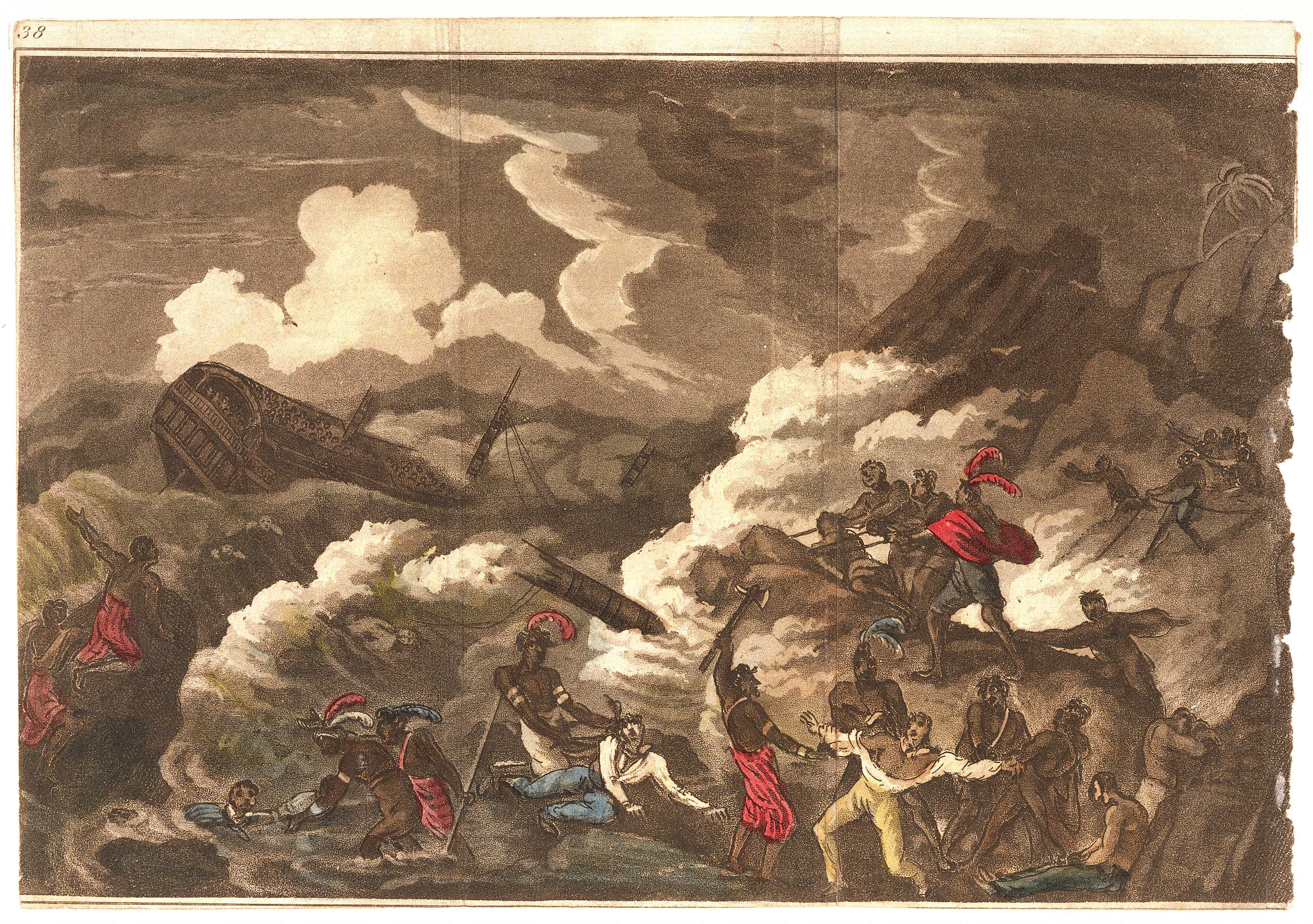
Loss of HMS Litchfield off the coast of Barbary 30 Nov 1758

According to the account of Lieutenant Southerland:

At six in the morning I was awakened by a very great shock, and a confused noise of the men on deck. I ran up, thinking some ship had run afoul of us, for by my own reckoning, and that of every other person on the ship, we were at least 35 leagues distant from land; but, before I could reach the quarter-deck, the ship gave a great stroke upon the ground, and the sea broke over her.

The ship was badly damaged, and broke apart during the day. Around 220 of the 350 crew managed to reach the shore. They were captured and held as slaves for 18 months until ransomed with other Europeans in April 1760.

== Bibliography ==
- Andrus and Starr, ed. (1813). "The loss of His Majesty's Ship Litchfield, of Fifty guns, on the Coast of Barbary, Nov. 30, 1758". Remarkable Shipwrecks; Or, A Collection of Interesting Accounts of Naval Disasters. Hartford, CT: Andrus and Starr. OCLC 1319586.
- Beatson, Robert (1804). Naval and Military Memoirs of Great Britain, from 1727 to 1783. Longman, Hurst, Rees and Orme. p. 183. "Litchfield 1758."
- Lavery, Brian (1983). The Ship of the Line - Volume 1: The development of the battlefleet 1650-1850. Conway Maritime Press. ISBN 0851772528.
- Rodger, N. A. M. (1986). The Wooden World: An Anatomy of the Georgian Navy. Annapolis, Maryland: Naval Institute Press. ISBN 0870219871.
