= Pednathise Head =

Island in the Isles of Scilly, United Kingdom

- Location within Isles of Scilly

Geography
- Coordinates: 49.8634°N 6.4027°W
- OS grid reference: SV837052
- Archipelago: Isles of Scilly

Administration
- United Kingdom
- Civil parish: St Agnes

Demographics
- Population: 0

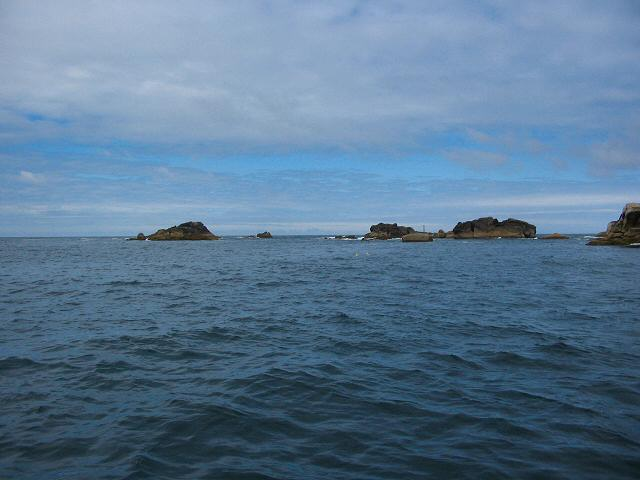
The Western Rocks

Pednathise Head is a skerry that is the southernmost point of England, the United Kingdom, and the British Isles if the Channel Islands are excluded. It is part of the Western Rocks group of the Isles of Scilly, southwest of Cornwall.
