= Ann Cargill =

British opera singer

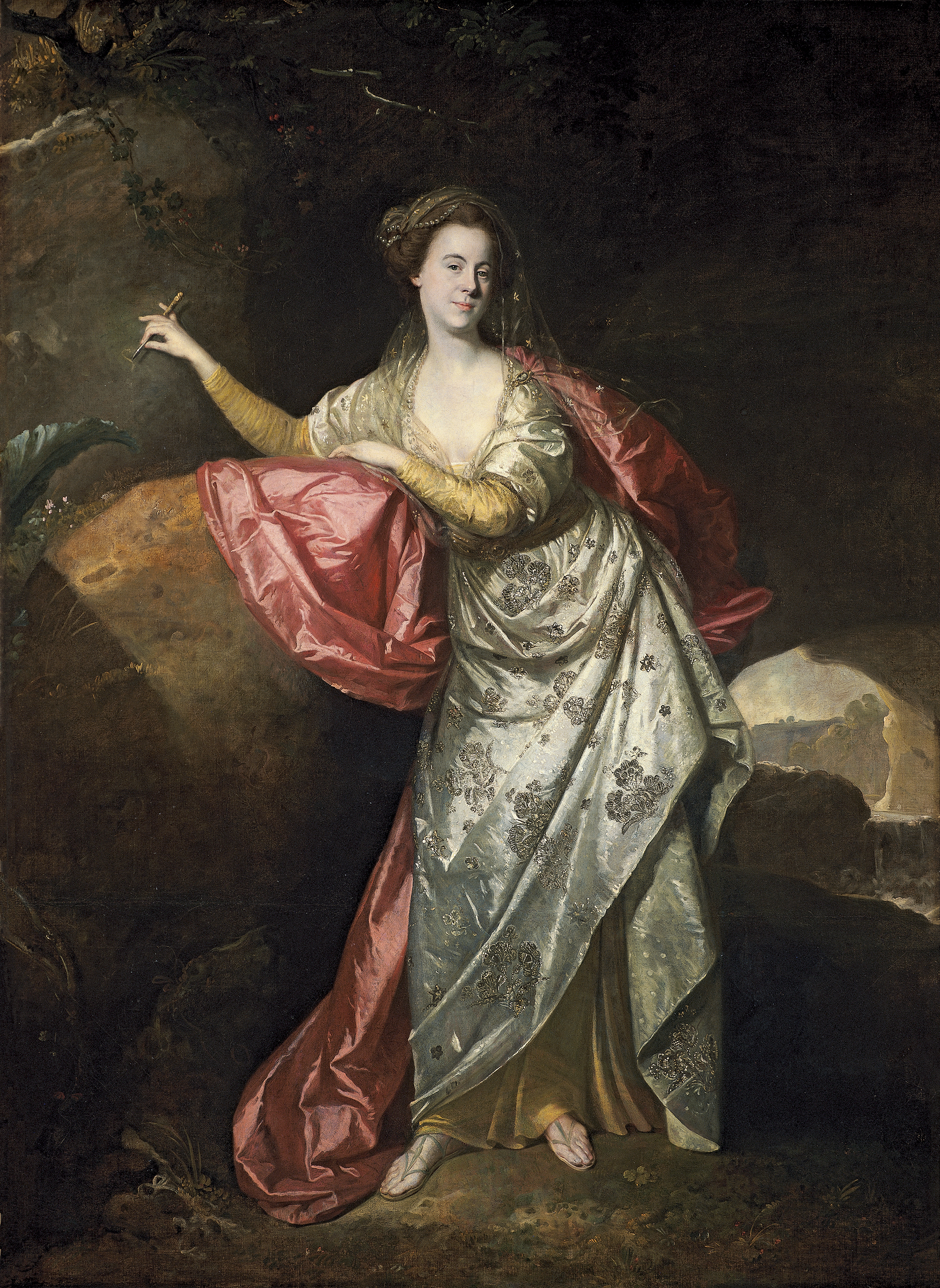
- In the role of Miranda, painted by Johann Zoffany in 1770
- Born: Ann Brown; 1760
- Died: 4 March 1784 (aged 23–24); Isles of Scilly
- Occupation: Opera singer

Ann Cargill (born Ann Brown) (1760 – 4 March 1784) was a British opera diva and celebrated beauty whose life and death were a sensation in London at the close of the 18th century.

== Life ==
Ann was born in London, the daughter of coal merchant Edward Brown. She made her debut at the age of eleven portraying Fanny in The Maid of the Mill at Covent Garden Theatre in November 1771. She continued to perform there for nine years and enjoyed success as a singing ingenue, particularly in the role of Venus in The West Indian, a part she performed for the first time on 20 October 1773.

She was described as a delightful singer and displayed a comic talent which made her "an amazing favourite" with the public, but she also attracted scandal in the press for love affairs with her admirers, and trying to break free from her father's guardianship. She made repeated attempts to escape from her father, before being apprehended and forced to return home. He also opposed her appearing on stage, which created conflicts with theatre management. In an incident from 1776, after running away she was placed in the house of her aunt and made to wait for her father, upon which several of her colleagues from Covent Garden instead came and carried her away (with her aunt's blessing) to the playhouse instead, so she could appear in a show that night.

In 1780, she left the theatre and eloped with a Mr. R. Cargill, and married him on 24 May in Edinburgh. Between 1780 and 1782, she was engaged with Colman's company in Haymarket during the summers, and at Drury Lane theatre during the winters.

However, by 1783 she was reported to have a begun a new affair, although the man's identity is unclear as the newspapers give several possible names for him, mentioning an "Oriental Diamond Mongerer", an unnamed "sea captain" as well as a Mr Rumbold, who had been banished to India by his father for his debts and who arranged for her to accompany him. Her lover was in the British East India Company and stationed in Calcutta, so she left England for India. In 1783, she performed operatic parts in Calcutta, to tremendous applause, and her benefit night brought in "the astonishing sum of 12,000 rupees." However, because the directors of the East India Company had "settled that the pure shores of India should not be invaded by an actress" (indeed, the Calcutta Theatre had an all-male cast), she was obliged to leave India.

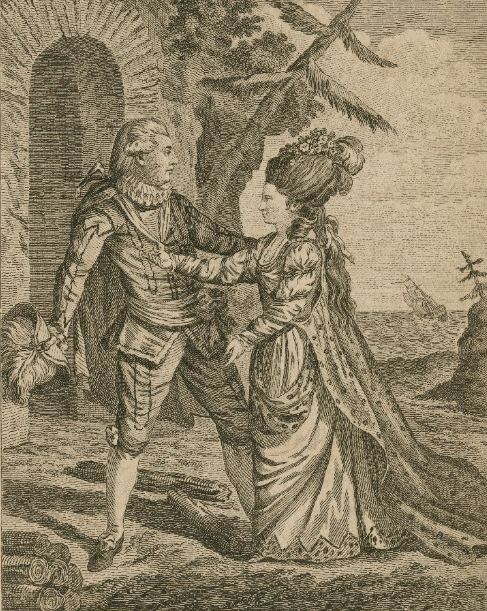
Miss Brown and Mr. Mattocks in the characters of Miranda and Ferdinand from The Tempest

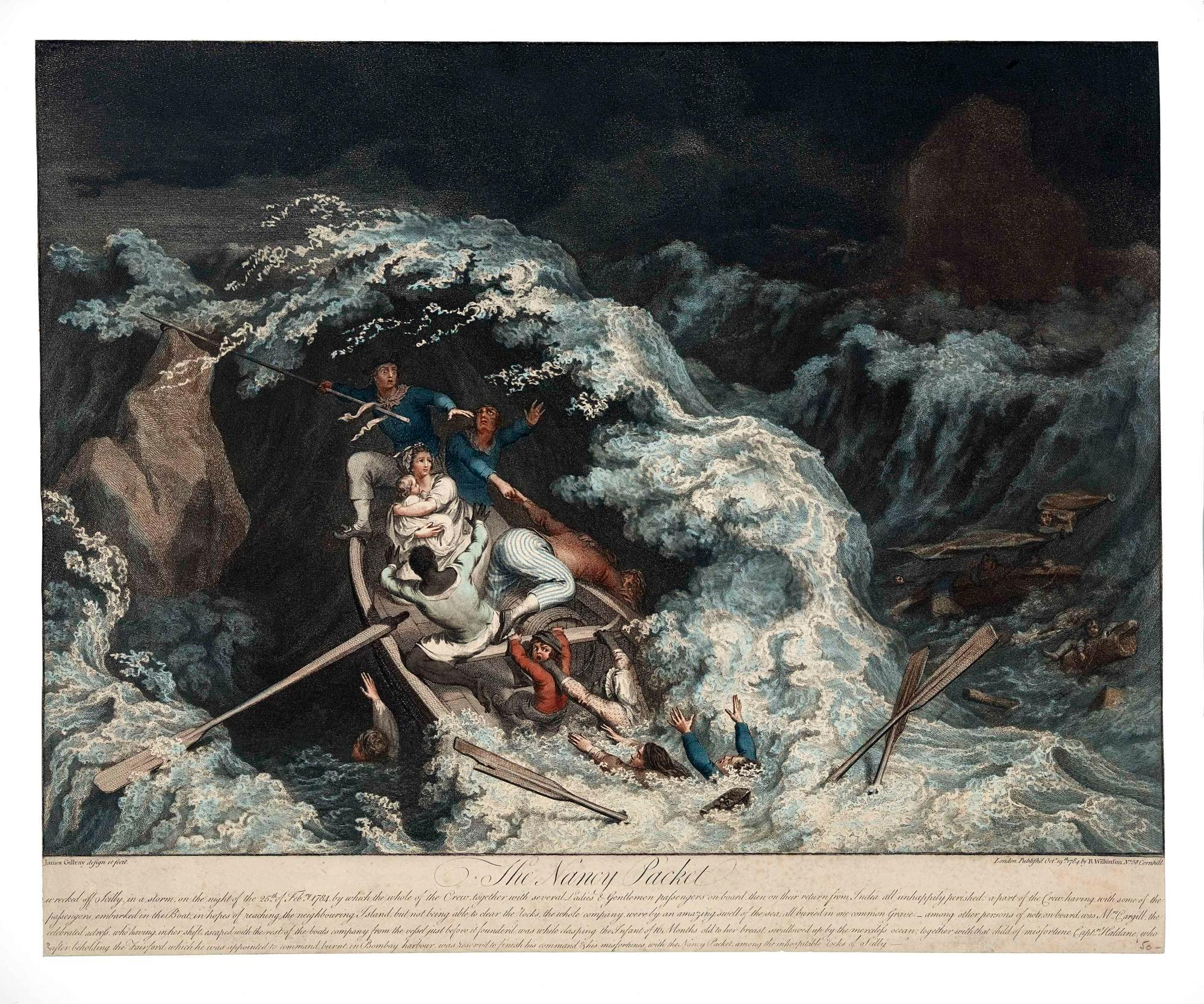
The death of Ann Cargill, by James Gillray

She was a passenger on the packet ship Nancy, (whose captain, John Haldane, was also reported to be her lover) when it wrecked and sank off the Isles of Scilly on 4 March 1784. Her body, originally unidentified, was buried on Rosevear, before being reburied at Old Town Church on St Mary's in the Isles of Scilly. The newspaper accounts of her death and how the body had been found "floating in her shift" with an infant at her bosom made her a tragic figure for the English press. In September 2008, British divers claimed to have found the wreck of the Nancy, further out from the Isles of Scilly than was previously thought.
