= Fishers, Indiana =

- City
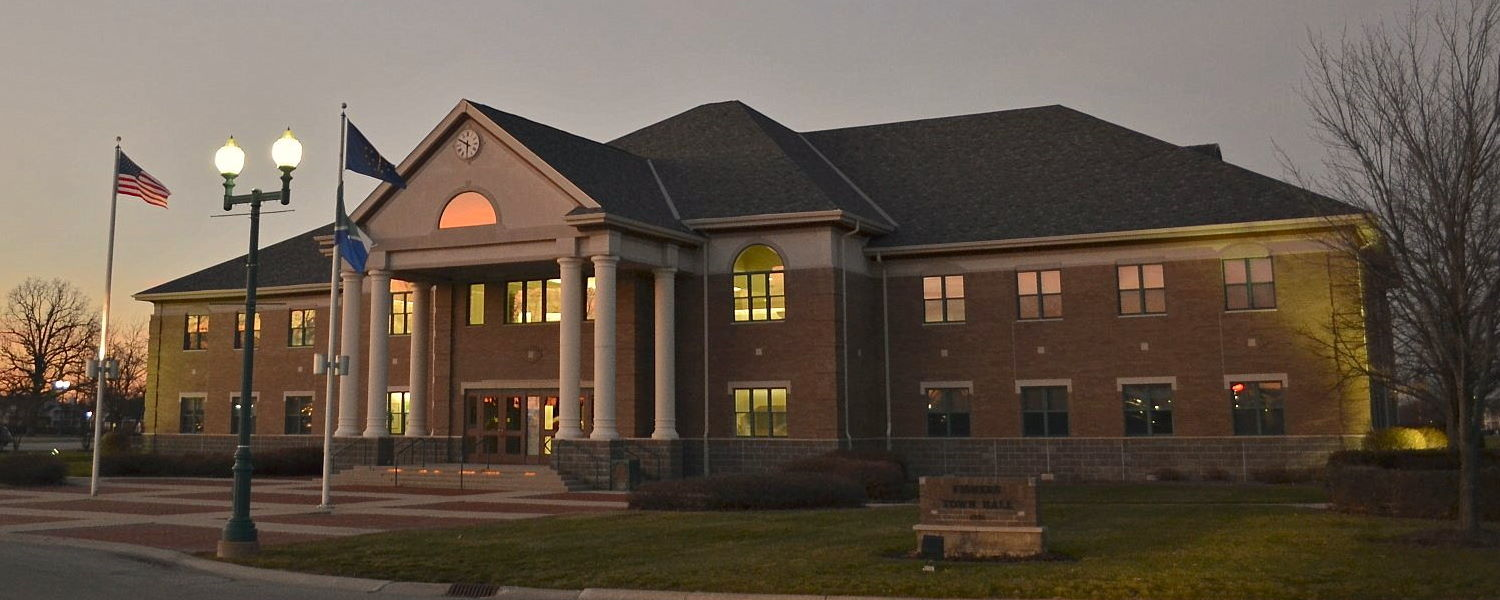
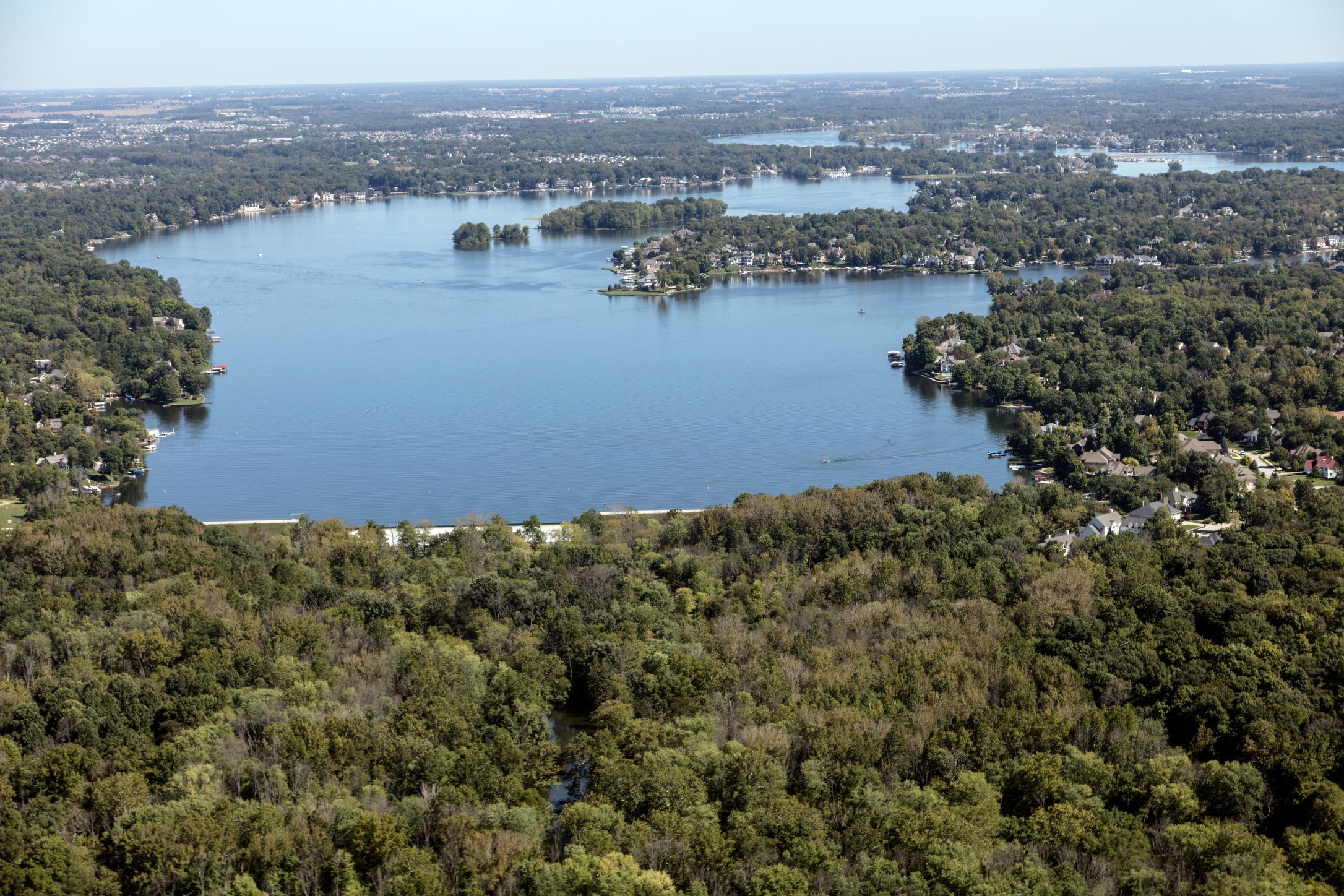
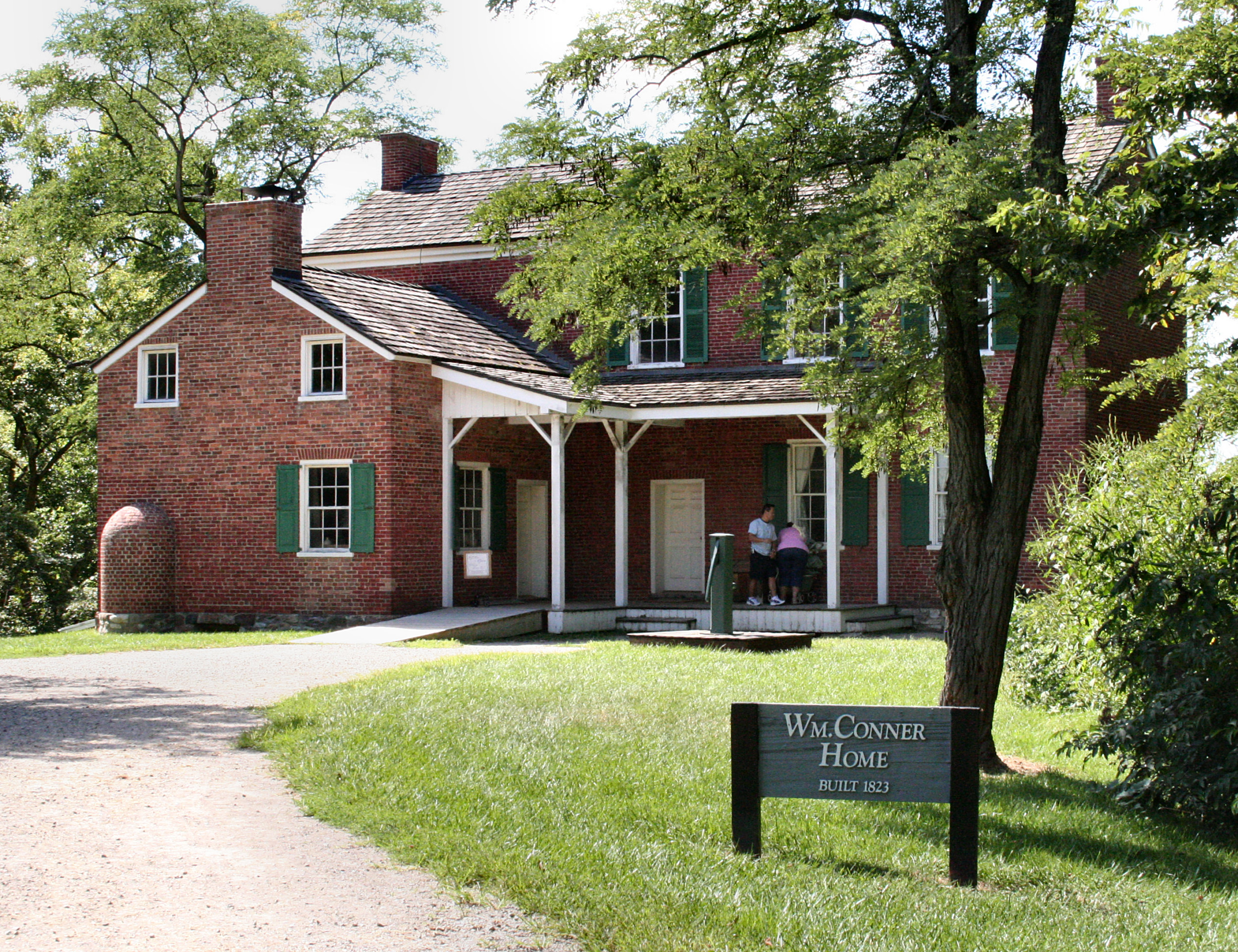
- Fishers City Hall Geist Reservoir Conner Prairie

- Flag Logo
- Interactive map of Fishers, Indiana
- Location within Indiana Location within the United States
- Coordinates: 39°57′22″N 86°0′46″W
- Country: United States
- State: Indiana
- County: Hamilton
- Townships: Fall Creek, Delaware
- Platted: 1872
- Incorporated (town): 1891
- Incorporated (city): January 1, 2015

Government
  - Mayor: Scott Fadness (R)

Area
  - Total: 38.15 sq mi (98.82 km^{2})
  - Land: 35.92 sq mi (93.02 km^{2})
  - Water: 2.24 sq mi (5.79 km^{2})
- Elevation: 827 ft (252 m)

Population (2020)
  - Total: 98,977
  - Density: 2,760/sq mi (1,064/km^{2})
- Time zone: UTC−5 (EST)
  - Summer (DST): UTC−4 (EDT)
- ZIP Codes: 46038, 46037, 46040
- Area code: 317
- FIPS code: 18-23278
- GNIS feature ID: 2396939
- Website: fishersin.gov

Fishers is a city in Hamilton County, Indiana, United States. The population was 98,677 at the 2020 census. It is a northern suburb of Indianapolis. Established in 1872 as a small railroad settlement known as Fishers Switch, the city remained a rural community for much of its history before experiencing substantial residential and commercial growth beginning in the late 20th century.

== History ==
=== 19th century ===
In 1802, William Conner settled in territory that would eventually become Fishers. Conner built a log cabin and a trading post along the White River. The land that Conner settled is now known as Conner Prairie and is preserved as a living history museum.

Settlers started moving to the area after Indiana became a state in 1816 and the Delaware Indians gave up their claims in Indiana and Ohio to the United States government in 1818 in the Treaty of St. Mary's. At the treaty William Conner served as an interpreter for Chief William Anderson, his father-in-law. At the time William Conner was married to Mekinges Conner, daughter of Chief William Anderson. In 1823, Hamilton County was chartered by the Indiana General Assembly and Delaware Township was established and surveyed. After the state of Indiana moved its capital to Indianapolis from Corydon in 1825, the community started to grow. After the move, John Finch established a horse-powered grinding mill, a blacksmith shop, and the area's first school. The next year the area's first water mill was constructed.

During 1826 the West-Harris House, later nicknamed Ambassador House, was built near the White River at present-day 96th Street and Allisonville Road in Fishers. The home was moved to its present-day site at 106th Street and Eller Road in 1996. Addison C. Harris (1840–1916), a prominent Indianapolis lawyer and former member of the Indiana Senate (1876 to 1880), acquired the property in 1880 and had the home remodeled and enlarged around 1895. Harris and wife, India Crago Harris (1848–1948), used the home as a summer residence. Its nickname of Ambassador House relates to Addison Harris's diplomatic service (1899 to 1901) as U.S. Envoy Extraordinary and Minister Plenipotentiary to Austria-Hungary during President William McKinley's administration. The restored Ambassador House is located on the grounds of Heritage Park at White River in Fishers and is operated as a local history museum and a site for community events and private rentals.

In 1849, construction began on the Peru & Indianapolis Railroad, extending from Indianapolis to Chicago. The railroad brought several people to the area then known as "Fisher's Switch". In 1872, Fisher's Switch, also known as "Fishers Station", was platted by Salathial Fisher at the present-day intersection of 116th Street and the railroad. Indiana's General Assembly incorporated Fisher's Station in 1891.

The William Conner House and West-Harris House are listed on the National Register of Historic Places.

=== 20th century ===
In 1908, the post office changed the name of Fishers Switch to "Fishers" by dropping "Switch."

After William Conner's death in 1855, his family farm became a place of interest. The Hamilton County Historical Society placed a marker on the site of the William Conner farm in 1927. Eli Lilly, then head of Eli Lilly and Company, purchased William Conner's farm in 1934 and began restoring it. In 1964, Lilly asked Earlham College to oversee the Conner farm, now known as Conner Prairie.

In 1943, the Indianapolis Water Company constructed Geist Reservoir in order to prevent a deficit in Indianapolis's water supply. They believed that Fall Creek and the White River would not keep up with the demand for water in Indianapolis. In the 1970s, the company wanted to triple the size of the lake, but the plan was rejected in 1978 and homes began to spring up around the reservoir. Germantown, a small settlement, currently resides at the bottom of the reservoir.

The Fishers population grew slowly to 344 by the 1960 census when rail shipment declined. Per township referendums in 1961, the town provided planning services for Delaware and Fall Creek Townships and approved residential zoning for most of the undeveloped area in the two townships.

The relocation of State Road 37 to the east side of town and the connection with Interstate 69 ensured the future growth of Fishers as a commercial and residential center. The town of Fishers would soon become a fast-growing suburb of Indianapolis. Fall Creek Township became the site of a consolidation of area schools when Hamilton Southeastern High School was formed in the 1960s. In 1989 the town's population reached 7,000 and the first Freedom Festival was held, renamed in later years to Spark!Fishers.

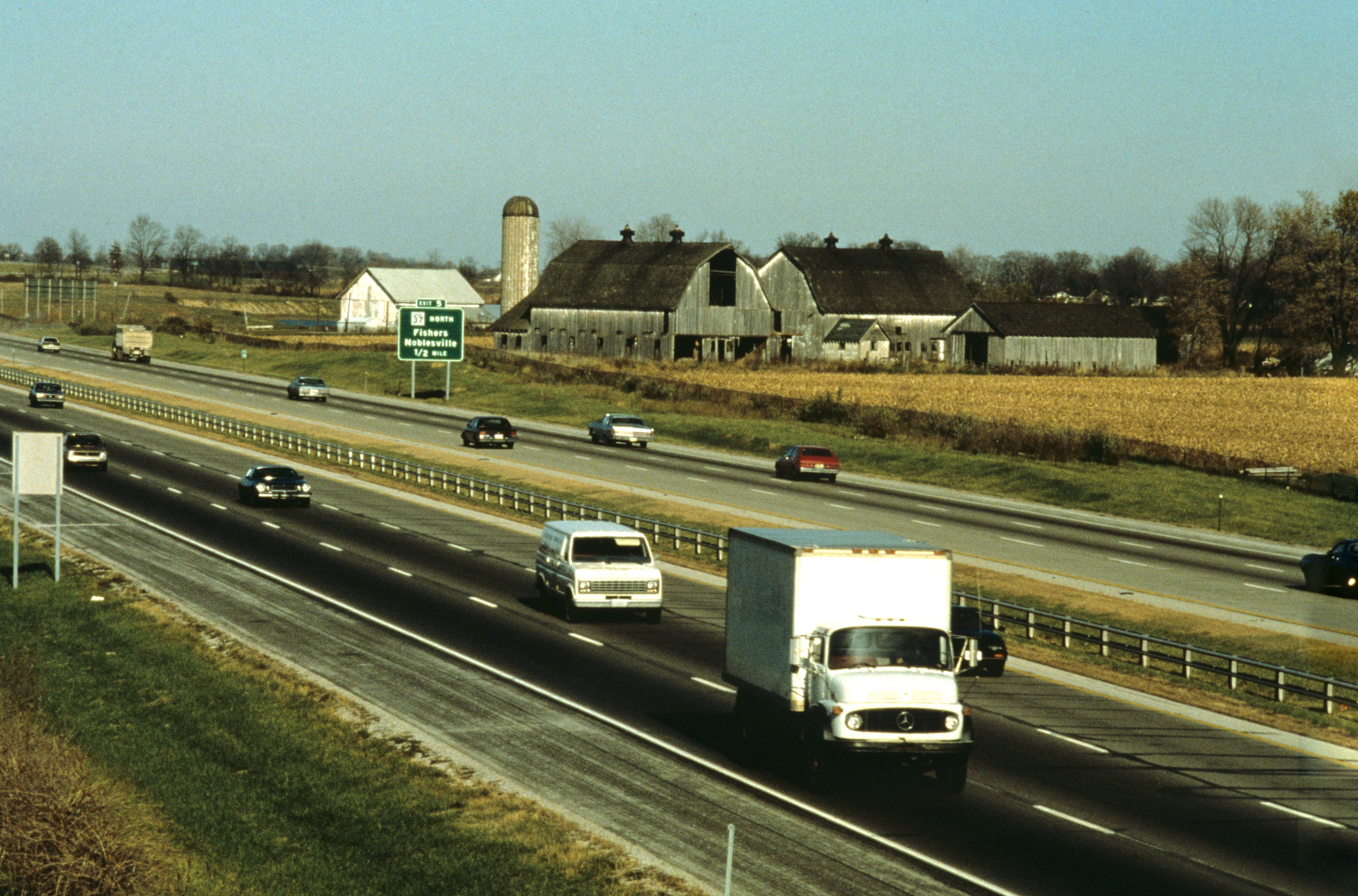
Interstate 69 passes a rural farmstead near 106th Street in 1991

The Thomas A. Weaver Municipal Complex opened as Fishers' civic and government center in 1992. The complex is home to the Fishers City Hall, the police and fire department headquarters buildings, the Fishers Post Office, the Hamilton County Convention and Visitor's Bureau, and the Fishers Chamber of Commerce. Eventually, a library and an office of the Indiana Bureau of Motor Vehicles were added. This is still the center of government in Fishers.

=== 21st century ===
The 2000 census reported the population of Fishers at almost 38,000. With the town's affordable homes, growing economy, and proximity to Indianapolis and Interstate 69, the growth in Fishers was tremendous. In 2003 the town of Fishers requested a special census from the U.S. Census Bureau to accurately measure the rapid population growth since 2000. This census would put the town's population at 52,390, a 38 percent increase from the 2000 census. Since then much of the government's resources have been devoted to building parks, maintaining roads, and managing the rapid growth of the town.

In 2005, after a controversy over alleged mismanagement, Conner Prairie formally split from Earlham College, becoming an independent corporation.

In January 2009, the Geist United Opposition conceded a four-year legal battle with Fishers over the involuntary annexation of the contiguous, unincorporated area around Geist Reservoir. This allowed Fishers to annex and incorporate this area of 2,200 homes on January 2, 2010, and to begin taxing it in 2011. This increased Fishers' population by about 5,500, making the town the eighth-largest community in Indiana.

In 2012, Fishers constructed a multipurpose trail along the original route of the Nickel Plate railroad line in the downtown district and an amphitheater in the Thomas A. Weaver Municipal Complex. That November, the town announced the details of a major development project in the heart of downtown. The $33 million pedestrian-oriented, mixed-use development on the north side of 116th Street, just west of Municipal Drive, broke ground in mid-2013 and was scheduled to be completed in 2015.

==== City controversy ====
In 1998, a referendum to change Fishers from a town to a city was rejected by 75% of the town's voters.

In 2008, a group named "CityYes" began collecting petition signatures for a voter referendum on the question of whether or not to become a city. The town appointed a 44-member citizen study committee to review the benefits and drawbacks of a change of government type.

In December 2010, the Fishers Town Council approved two referendum questions: whether or not to become a traditional city with an elected mayor and traditional city council or a modified city with a mayor elected by and from the expanded nine-member city council. The latter would have also merged the governments of Fishers and Fall Creek Township. In the referendum held November 6, 2012, voters rejected the merger with Fall Creek Township to become a modified city with an appointed mayor 62% to 37%, while approving a change to a traditional "second-class city", with an elected mayor 55% to 44%.

== Geography ==
Fishers is located in the southeast corner of Hamilton County along the West Fork of the White River. It is bordered to the west by Carmel, to the north by Noblesville, to the east by the town of Ingalls and unincorporated land in Madison County, to the southeast by Fortville, McCordsville and unincorporated land in Hancock County, and to the south by the city of Indianapolis in Marion County. The center of Fishers is 16 miles (26 km) northeast of downtown Indianapolis.

According to the 2010 census, Fishers has a total area of 35.839 square miles (92.82 km^{2}), of which 33.59 square miles (87.00 km^{2}) (or 93.72%) is land and 2.249 square miles (5.82 km^{2}) (or 6.28%) is water.

=== Climate ===
Fishers has a humid continental climate (Köppen climate classification). Summers in Fishers are hot and humid with temperatures regularly in the 85 °F range. Autumns and springs in Fishers have very comfortable temperatures normally around 70 °F, but springs have much less predictable weather and drastic temperature changes are common. Winters are cold and filled with snow and ice storms. During winter, temperatures are normally around 35 °F and often dip below 20 °F at night.

Climate data for Fishers
Month	Jan	Feb	Mar	Apr	May	Jun	Jul	Aug	Sep	Oct	Nov	Dec	Year
Mean daily maximum °F (°C)	34 (1)	39 (4)	50 (10)	62 (17)	72 (22)	81 (27)	85 (29)	83 (28)	77 (25)	65 (18)	51 (11)	38 (3)	61 (16)
Mean daily minimum °F (°C)	17 (−8)	20 (−7)	29 (−2)	39 (4)	50 (10)	60 (16)	64 (18)	62 (17)	54 (12)	42 (6)	33 (1)	23 (−5)	43 (6)
Average precipitation inches (mm)	2.42 (61)	2.52 (64)	3.28 (83)	3.92 (100)	4.86 (123)	4.15 (105)	4.49 (114)	4.06 (103)	3.32 (84)	3.02 (77)	3.77 (96)	3.14 (80)	42.95 (1,090)
Average snowfall inches (cm)	7 (18)	5 (13)	2 (5.1)	0 (0)	0 (0)	0 (0)	0 (0)	0 (0)	0 (0)	0 (0)	1 (2.5)	2 (5.1)	17 (43.7)
Source: City-Data

== Demographics ==
Historical population
Census	Pop.	Note	%±
1880	138		—
1910	188		—
1920	142		−24.5%
1930	138		−2.8%
1940	164		18.8%
1950	219		33.5%
1960	344		57.1%
1970	628		82.6%
1980	2,008		219.7%
1990	7,508		273.9%
2000	37,835		403.9%
2010	76,794		103.0%
2020	98,977		28.9%
2025 (est.)	104,812		5.9%
2020 Census

=== Racial and ethnic composition ===
Fishers, Indiana – Racial and ethnic composition Note: the US Census treats Hispanic/Latino as an ethnic category. This table excludes Latinos from the racial categories and assigns them to a separate category. Hispanics/Latinos may be of any race.
Race / Ethnicity (NH = Non-Hispanic)	Pop 2000	Pop 2010	Pop 2020	% 2000	% 2010	% 2020
White alone (NH)	34,400	64,058	74,625	90.92%	83.42%	75.40%
Black or African American alone (NH)	1,096	4,228	6,556	2.90%	5.51%	6.62%
Native American or Alaska Native alone (NH)	43	109	140	0.11%	0.14%	0.14%
Asian alone (NH)	1,159	4,174	7,897	3.06%	5.44%	7.98%
Native Hawaiian or Pacific Islander alone (NH)	6	14	30	0.02%	0.02%	0.03%
Other race alone (NH)	33	207	473	0.09%	0.27%	0.48%
Mixed race or Multiracial (NH)	334	1,366	4,244	0.88%	1.78%	4.29%
Hispanic or Latino (any race)	764	2,638	5,012	2.02%	3.44%	5.06%
Total	37,835	76,794	98,977	100.00%	100.00%	100.00%

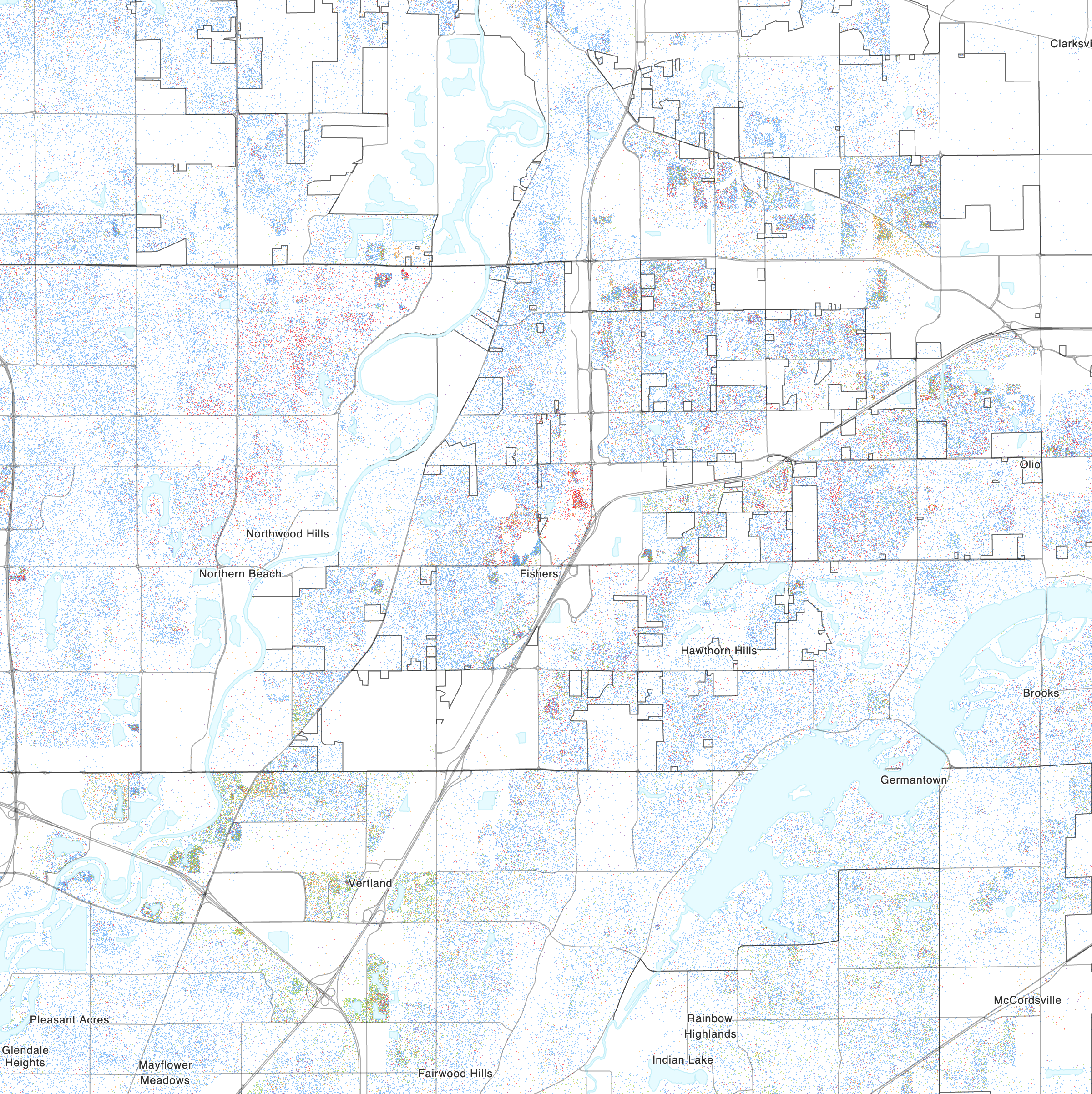
Map of racial distribution in Fishers, 2020 U.S. census. Each dot is one person: ⬤ White ⬤ Black ⬤ Asian ⬤ Hispanic ⬤ Multiracial ⬤ Native American/Other

=== 2020 census ===
As of the 2020 census, Fishers had a population of 98,977. The median age was 36.7 years. 28.8% of residents were under the age of 18 and 11.2% of residents were 65 years of age or older. For every 100 females there were 93.1 males, and for every 100 females age 18 and over there were 89.8 males age 18 and over.

99.9% of residents lived in urban areas, while 0.1% lived in rural areas.

There were 35,565 households in Fishers, of which 42.4% had children under the age of 18 living in them. Of all households, 61.8% were married-couple households, 12.0% were households with a male householder and no spouse or partner present, and 21.4% were households with a female householder and no spouse or partner present. About 20.9% of all households were made up of individuals and 6.7% had someone living alone who was 65 years of age or older.

There were 36,930 housing units, of which 3.7% were vacant. The homeowner vacancy rate was 0.7% and the rental vacancy rate was 8.5%.

Racial composition as of the 2020 census
Race	Number	Percent
White	75,761	76.5%
Black or African American	6,673	6.7%
American Indian and Alaska Native	211	0.2%
Asian	7,940	8.0%
Native Hawaiian and Other Pacific Islander	31	0.0%
Some other race	1,687	1.7%
Two or more races	6,674	6.7%
Hispanic or Latino (of any race)	5,012	5.1%

=== American Community Survey estimates ===
According to a 2007 estimate, the median income for a household in the town was $86,518, and the median income for a family was $103,176. Males had a median income of $58,275 versus $37,841 for females. The per capita income for the town was $31,891. 1.8% of the population and 1.1% of families were below the poverty line. Out of the total population, 1.6% of those under the age of 18 and 0.9% of those 65 and older were living below the poverty line.

The city's homeownership rate was 81.9% with an average of 2.77 people per household. 14.1% of Fishers' housing units were multi-unit structures. Residents had an average travel time of 23.1 minutes to work each day. Fishers also has one of the lowest unemployment rates in the state at 4.5%.

=== 2010 census ===
As of the census of 2010, there were 76,794 people, 27,218 households, and 20,404 families residing in the town. The population density was 2,286.2 inhabitants per square mile (882.7/km^{2}). There were 28,511 housing units at an average density of 848.8 per square mile (327.7/km^{2}). The racial makeup of the town was 85.6% White, 5.6% African American, 0.2% Native American, 5.5% Asian, 1.1% from other races, and 2.1% from two or more races. Hispanic or Latino of any race were 3.4% of the population.

There were 27,218 households, of which 48.1% had children under the age of 18 living with them, 64.1% were married couples living together, 7.9% had a female householder with no husband present, 3.0% had a male householder with no wife present, and 25.0% were non-families. 19.8% of all households were made up of individuals, and 3.8% had someone living alone who was 65 years of age or older. The average household size was 2.82 and the average family size was 3.31.

The median age in the town was 33.2 years. 33% of residents were under the age of 18; 4.9% were between the ages of 18 and 24; 34.4% were from 25 to 44; 22.1% were from 45 to 64; and 5.5% were 65 years of age or older. The gender makeup of the town was 48.6% male and 51.4% female.

== Economy ==
According to the city's 2020 Annual Comprehensive Financial Report, the top employers in the city are:

#	Employer	# of employees
1	Hamilton Southeastern Schools	2,626
2	Navient	1,650
3	City of Fishers	536
4	Stratosphere Quality	517
5	Topgolf	500
6	Freedom Mortgage	436
7	Stanley Convergent Security Solutions, Inc.	350
8	Community Home Health Services	330
9	Conner Prairie	337
10	US Foods	320

== Arts and culture ==
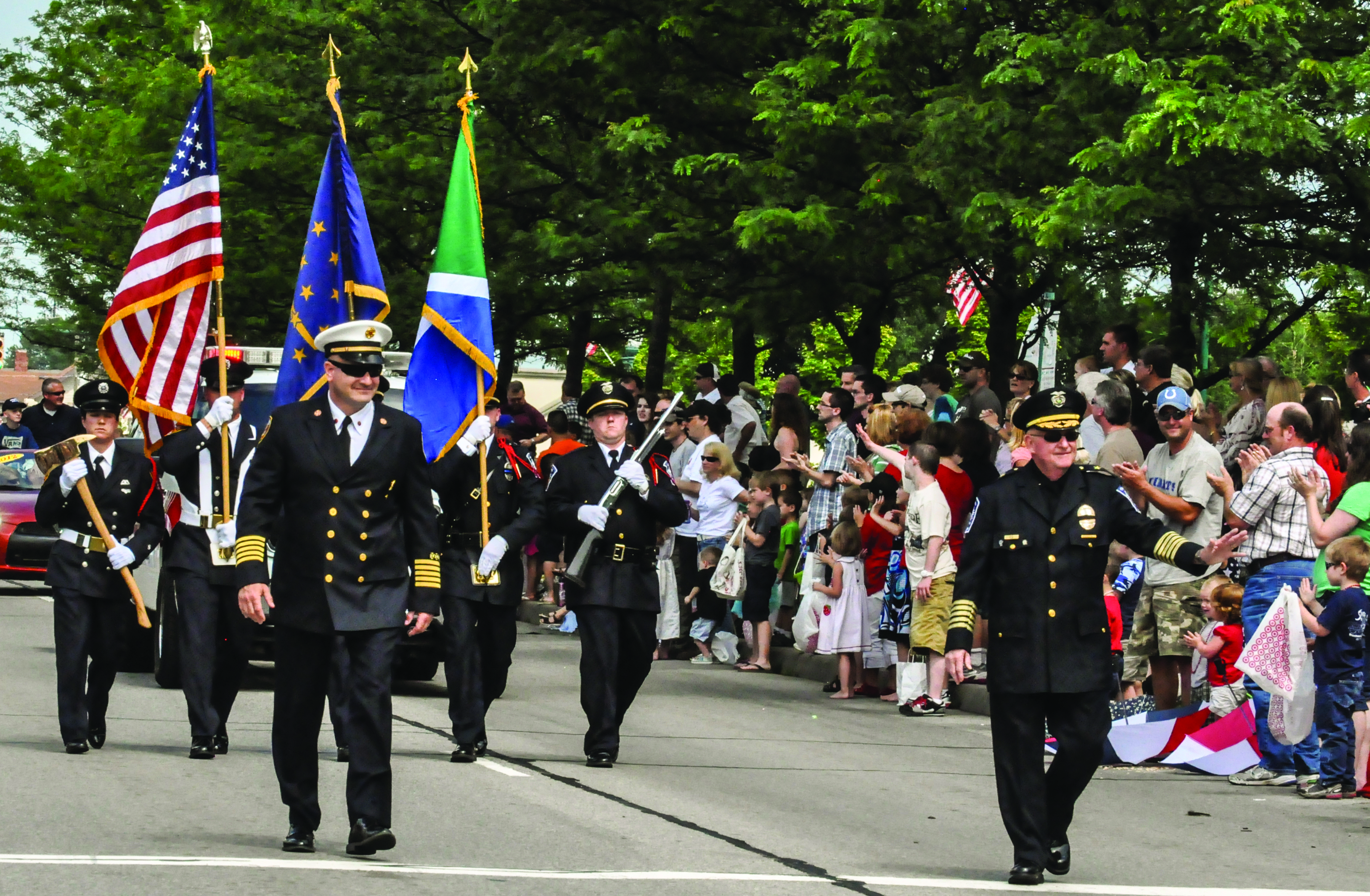
Parade in Freedom Festival (now Spark!Fishers), in 2011

Fishers annual festival is Spark!Fishers, which takes place every year on the last weekend in June, right before Independence Day. A few annual traditions of the festival are a parade, a 5k run/walk and a fireworks show. There are art and food vendors and game booths. The festival is located in the Fishers Municipal Complex.

== Sports ==
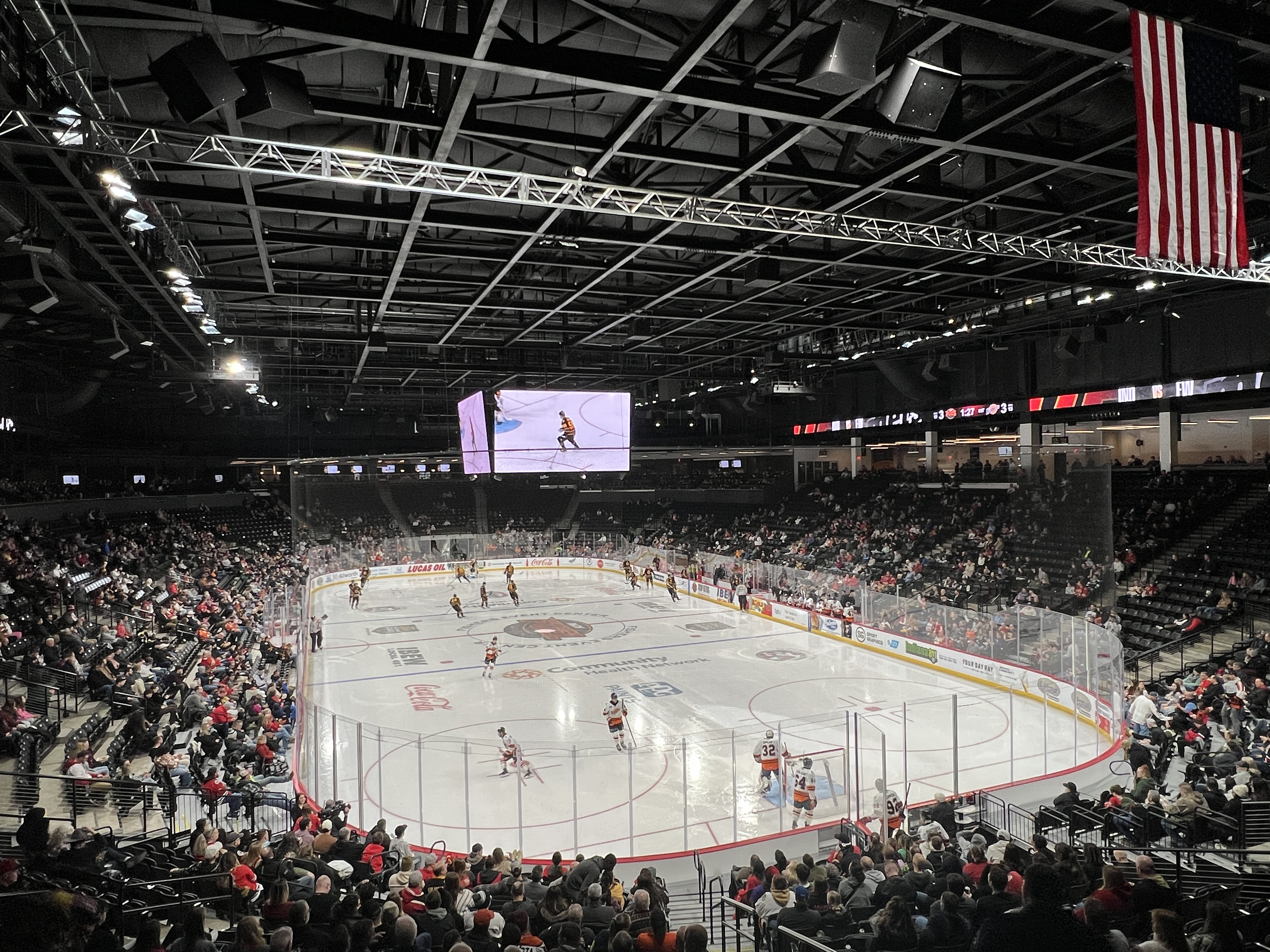
Fishers Event Center during an Indy Fuel hockey game in 2025

The Indy Fuel, a minor league hockey team in the ECHL, play their home games at the Fishers Event Center, a $170 million facility in Fishers District that opened in November 2024.

In 2023, Indy Fuel owner, Jim Hallett, purchased the rights to an Indoor Football League (IFL) team. In December 2023, the team name was revealed to be the Fishers Freight.

The Hoosier State Instigators of the American Basketball Association have played at Best Choice Fieldhouse since 2024.

== Parks and recreation ==
Fishers is home to 25 parks and nature preserve properties. The Fishers Trail & Greenway System has more than 131 miles (211 km) available for use.

- Billericay Park was named after the city's sister city of Billericay in Essex, England. The park has eight youth baseball fields, a multi-use trail through Billericay Woods, a playground, and a splash pad with a picnic facility.
- Brooks School Park is a 16.5-acre (6.7 ha) park that has an ADA accessible playground for children, a multipurpose trail, a large athletic field, and a basketball court. In 2024, Fishers Parks partnered with local NBA player Gary Harris to design murals on the basketball courts. There is also a Fitness Court at the park offering seven stations for workouts.
- Cheeney Creek Natural Area includes the Cheeney Creek Greenway, a natural area, trail, and fishing dock.
- Cumberland Park has soccer fields, a trail along the Mud Creek Greenway, and a disc golf course.
- Cyntheanne Park has five multipurpose athletic fields as well as natural areas, two playground areas, pickleball courts, community gardens, and trails. The park is one of the most popular in the Indianapolis area for Pickleball, with competitive challenge courts donated by Steve Cage.
- Fishers Heritage Park at White River is home to the Historic Ambassador House and Heritage Gardens. More than 170 years ago, a two-story log house was built on what is now the northwest corner of 96th Street and Allisonville Road; this is now known as the Ambassador House. It was carefully cut into two sections and moved to its current location in Heritage Park (106th Street and Eller Road) on November 19, 1996.
- Flat Fork Creek Park, opened on December 3, 2015, and features a sledding hill, observation treehouses, trails, and mountain bike course.
- Hamilton Proper Park is a 19-acre (7.7 ha) park.
- Harrison Thompson Park is a multi-use park featuring three baseball fields, three soccer fields, a playground, and a 3/4 mile trail.
- Hoosier Woods is a small forest.
- Mudsock Fields contains three lighted football fields.
- Olio Fields is home to several softball fields.
- Ritchey Woods Nature Preserve is approximately 127 acres (51 ha): 42 acres (17 ha) are an Indiana State Designated Nature Preserve, and the remaining 85 acres (34 ha) are under a conservation easement governed by the Department of Natural Resources. The preserve offers five trails totaling 2 miles (3 km). Cheeney Creek passes through the north end of the property.
- Roy G. Holland Memorial Park has soccer, baseball, and softball fields, pickleball and sand volleyball courts, basketball courts, woods, a picnic area, splash pad, and a community building.
- Wapihani Nature Preserve is a 77-acre (31 ha) nature preserve located along the White River in Fishers. It was purchased with White River Restoration Trust funds in early 2006 by the Central Indiana Land Trust. Riverside Intermediate School is located immediately south of the property. The property is available for students to utilize as an outdoor educational laboratory.

One attraction in Fishers is Geist Reservoir, offering activities like fishing and waterskiing. The reservoir is located 5 miles (8 km) south of the Hamilton Town Center shopping complex. In 2023, the City opened Geist Waterfront Park, a 70-acre park featuring a beach and water access to Geist Reservoir, a non-motorized boat launch and dock access for kayaks, canoes, and paddle boards. There are many golf courses around Fishers. Fishers is home to Symphony on the Prairie, a summer concert series that takes place at Conner Prairie, presented by the Indianapolis Symphony Orchestra. The city also offers a free summer concert series at the Nickel Plate District Amphitheater behind the Fishers Municipal Center. Fishers Parks hosts outdoor festivals at the amphitheater as well as holiday events. Fishers is located near the Ruoff Home Mortgage Music Center in Noblesville, which hosts concerts.

== Government ==
Until 2012, Fishers used a council–manager government with a seven-member town council and a clerk-treasurer, all elected at-large for four years. After the passage of a referendum on its status in 2012, Fishers transitioned from a town to a second-class city on January 1, 2015. This included an elected mayor, city clerk and nine-member city council. The first mayor of Fishers, Scott Fadness, along with the city's first clerk and city council were sworn in on December 21, 2014.

== Education ==
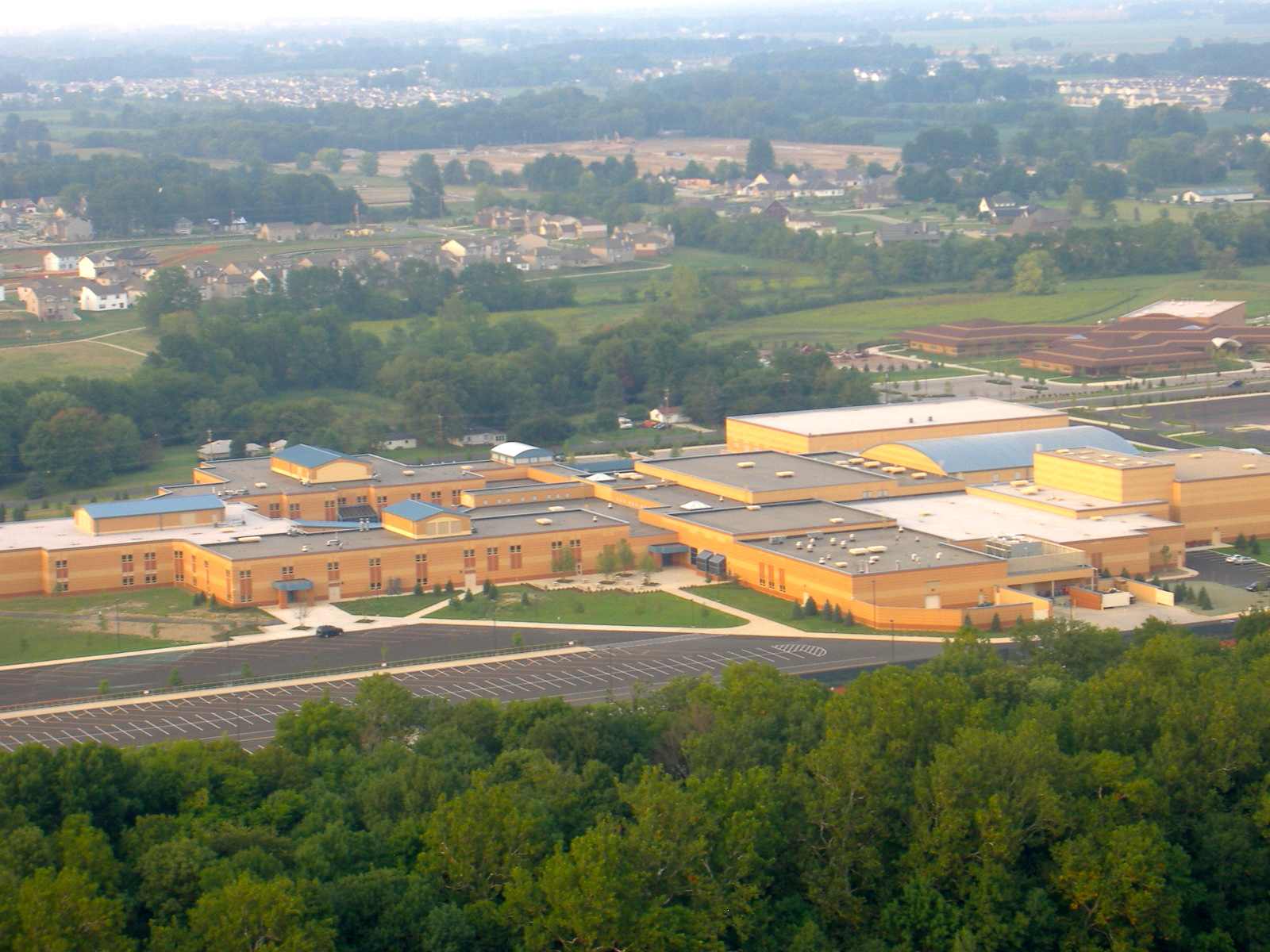
Aerial of Fishers High School in 2006

The city is part of the Hamilton Southeastern Schools, a district serving almost 21,000 students. Fishers' quickly growing population has created a need for a similar growth in the number of schools within the Hamilton Southeastern Schools district. In the 2025–2026 school year, the district has twelve elementary schools, four intermediate schools, four junior high schools and two high schools. The city's two public high schools are Hamilton Southeastern High School and Fishers High School.

Fishers also has several private schools, including Community Montessori School (PK-5), St. Louis de Montfort (PK-8), and Eman Schools (PK-12). Additional private schools are located in surrounding communities.

== Transportation ==
Fishers is located along Interstate 69. The city currently has four exits off the interstate. Fishers is 16 miles (26 km) northeast of downtown Indianapolis and 5 miles (8 km) from the Interstate 465 loop which connects Interstate 69 with Interstate 65, which runs northwest to Chicago and southward to Louisville; Interstate 70, running east to Columbus and southwest to St. Louis; and Interstate 74, running northwest towards Danville, and southeast towards Cincinnati. State Road 37 runs directly through Fishers, connecting Fishers with several other Indiana cities and towns.

Fishers has a general aviation airport, the Indianapolis Metropolitan Airport (KUMP). Indianapolis International Airport is located on the opposite side of Indianapolis from Fishers, about 30 miles (48 km) distant.

The roads in Fishers are mostly new and well-maintained. 116th Street won the American Concrete Pavement Association Main Street Award in 2006. A number of the town's four-way stops are being replaced by roundabouts.

On April 10, 2012, the town of Fishers announced a $20 million investment in the 2012 "Drive Fishers" initiative; an effort that will focus on areas in Fishers that have had a history of high-traffic volume, such as 96th Street and Allisonville Road, State Road 37, and Fall Creek Road in Geist.

== Notable people ==
Former race car driver Michael Andretti and wife Jodi Ann Paterson reside in Fishers.

Notable athletes who currently live in Fishers include Gary Harris of the Orlando Magic; and NFL players Evan Baylis; and Jeremy Chinn of the Washington Commanders. Notable athletes who have lived in Fishers include former Indiana Pacers players Reggie Miller, Austin Croshere, Malcolm Brogdon, Chris Duarte, Justin Holiday, and Dahntay Jones; Other notable athletes that have lived in Fishers include Gordon Hayward of the Charlotte Hornets; Zach Randolph of the Memphis Grizzlies; former Atlanta Hawks player Alan Henderson; Zak Irvin of the Michigan Wolverines; NFL player Rosevelt Colvin, formerly of the Houston Texans, Chicago Bears and New England Patriots; Randy Gregory of the Dallas Cowboys; Joe Reitz of the Indianapolis Colts; former Colts defensive line coach John Teerlinck; former San Diego Padres player Tony Gwynn; former professional wrestler Kevin Fertig, and Cleveland Guardians pitcher Justin Masterson.

== Sister cities ==
Fishers is twinned with the town of Billericay, Essex, United Kingdom. Billericay Park is named after the sister city.
