= Geist Reservoir =

Reservoir in Hamilton and Marion counties, Indiana, U.S.

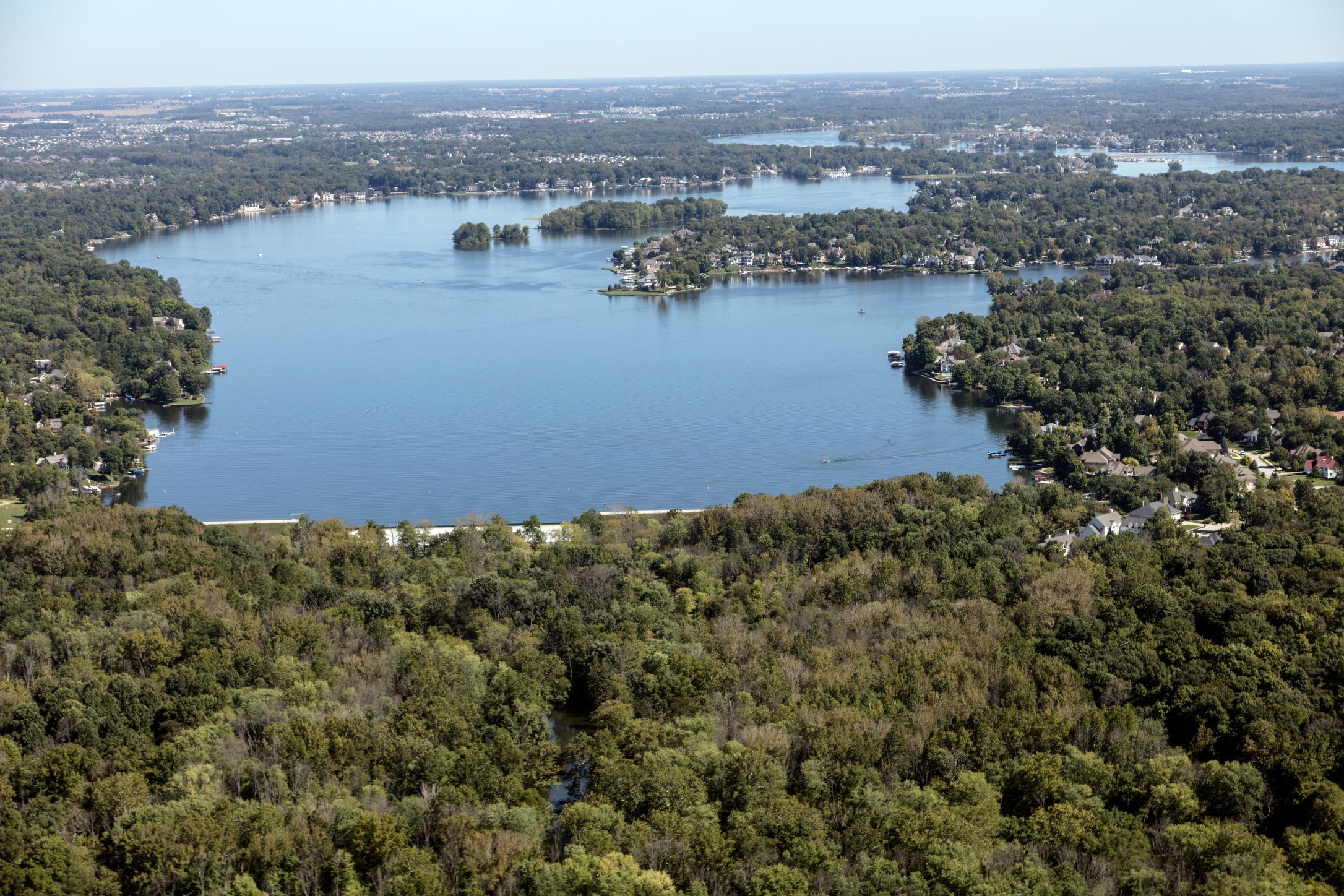

- Location within Indiana Location within the United States
- Location: Indianapolis / Fishers, Indiana
- Coordinates: 39.927°N 85.96°W
- Type: Reservoir
- Primary inflows: Fall Creek
- Primary outflows: Fall Creek
- Basin countries: United States
- Surface area: 1,890 acres (7.6 km^{2})
- Water volume: 6,100,000,000 US gal (0.023 km^{3})

Geist Reservoir is a reservoir in the northeastern part of metropolitan Indianapolis, Indiana, United States. It was constructed in 1943 by damming Fall Creek to provide water for Indianapolis. Upon completion, Geist Reservoir was the second-largest man-made lake in Indiana, providing approximately 6,900,000,000 US gallons (2.6×10^{10} L; 5.7×10^{9} imp gal) of water. It is now the 5th largest reservoir behind Monroe Lake (10,750 acres), Patoka Lake (8,800 acres), Brookville Lake (5,260 acres), and Cecil M. Harden Lake/Raccoon Lake (2,060 acres). The reservoir is located primarily in the northeast corner of Indianapolis and the southeast corner of Fishers, but small parts reach into the nearby towns of Lawrence, Fortville, and McCordsville.

== History ==
Geist Reservoir was named after Clarence H. Geist, a former owner of the Indianapolis Water Company, who foresaw a deficit in Indianapolis's water supply and envisioned the Geist Reservoir to preemptively address the problem. Planning for the reservoir began as early as 1913, when hydraulic engineers estimated that White River and Fall Creek would not provide enough water for the increasing needs of Indianapolis. Geist gradually bought some 5,000 acres (20 km^{2}) in the Fall Creek Valley in the 1920s and 1930s, including the small town of Germantown, which today lies at the bottom of the reservoir. Although controversial, the reservoir was completed in 1943, five years after Clarence Geist's death. In the 1960s further controversy arose over plans for commercial and residential development in the area around the lake. A proposal in the 1970s to triple the size of the reservoir was defeated, and a housing boom began in the lake area.

In recent years the Geist area has experienced rapid growth. The area is noted for its topography and the reservoir. In recent years the reservoir has experienced problems with algal blooms and invasive aquatic species.

As the result of a series of sales, the water company and the reservoir are now owned by Citizens Energy Group.

== Description ==
Geist Reservoir Dam is located at the lake's southern end. Fed by Fall Creek on the north, the lake overflow is directed into the creek again at the south. The earthen dam is 40 feet (12 m) high, with an overall length of 1,900 feet (580 m). The reservoir capacity is 60,000 acre-feet (74,000,000 m^{3}), although normal storage is 21,180 acre-feet (26,100,000 m^{3}). The reservoir is mostly rather shallow (10 feet (3.0 m) or less); the depth at the dam is 26 feet (7.9 m) and the maximum depth is 48 feet (15 m).

Geist Reservoir covers 1,900 acres (769 ha) and spans three counties in Indiana (Marion, Hamilton, and Hancock), four voting precincts, three school districts (Lawrence, Hamilton Southeastern, and Mt. Vernon), and features five different ZIP codes (46037, 46256, 46236, 46040, 46055). The area has undergone rapid development and some high-valued homes now line the reservoir's waterfront.

== Citizens Reservoir ==
In 2019, Citizens Energy Group began work to convert a former limestone quarry adjacent to Geist Reservoir into a supplemental reservoir named Citizens Reservoir. Situated near the southern shore of the north end of Geist, the new reservoir covers 88 acres (36 ha) and is 220 feet (67 m) deep. It holds three billion US gallons (1.1×10^{10} L; 2.5×10^{9} imp gal), equal to almost half the capacity of Geist Reservoir itself. Up to one hundred million US gallons (380,000,000 L; 83,000,000 imp gal) a day can be diverted into Citizens Reservoir when Geist Reservoir is full instead of going over the latter's spillway. When needed, up to thirty million US gallons (110,000,000 L; 25,000,000 imp gal) a day can be pumped from Citizens back into Geist. Construction was completed in 2020, and the reservoir was filled by early 2021.

The limestone quarry was previously owned by Irving Materials Inc. and had operated for 50 years before closing in 2018. Citizens Energy spent over $20 million on the project.

== See also ==
- List of dams and reservoirs in Indiana
