= List of dams and reservoirs in Indiana =

Following is a list of dams and reservoirs in Indiana.

All major dams are linked below. The National Inventory of Dams defines any "major dam" as being 50 feet (15 m) tall with a storage capacity of at least 5,000 acre-feet (6,200,000 m^{3}), or of any height with a storage capacity of 25,000 acre-feet (31,000,000 m^{3}).

== Dams and reservoirs in Indiana ==
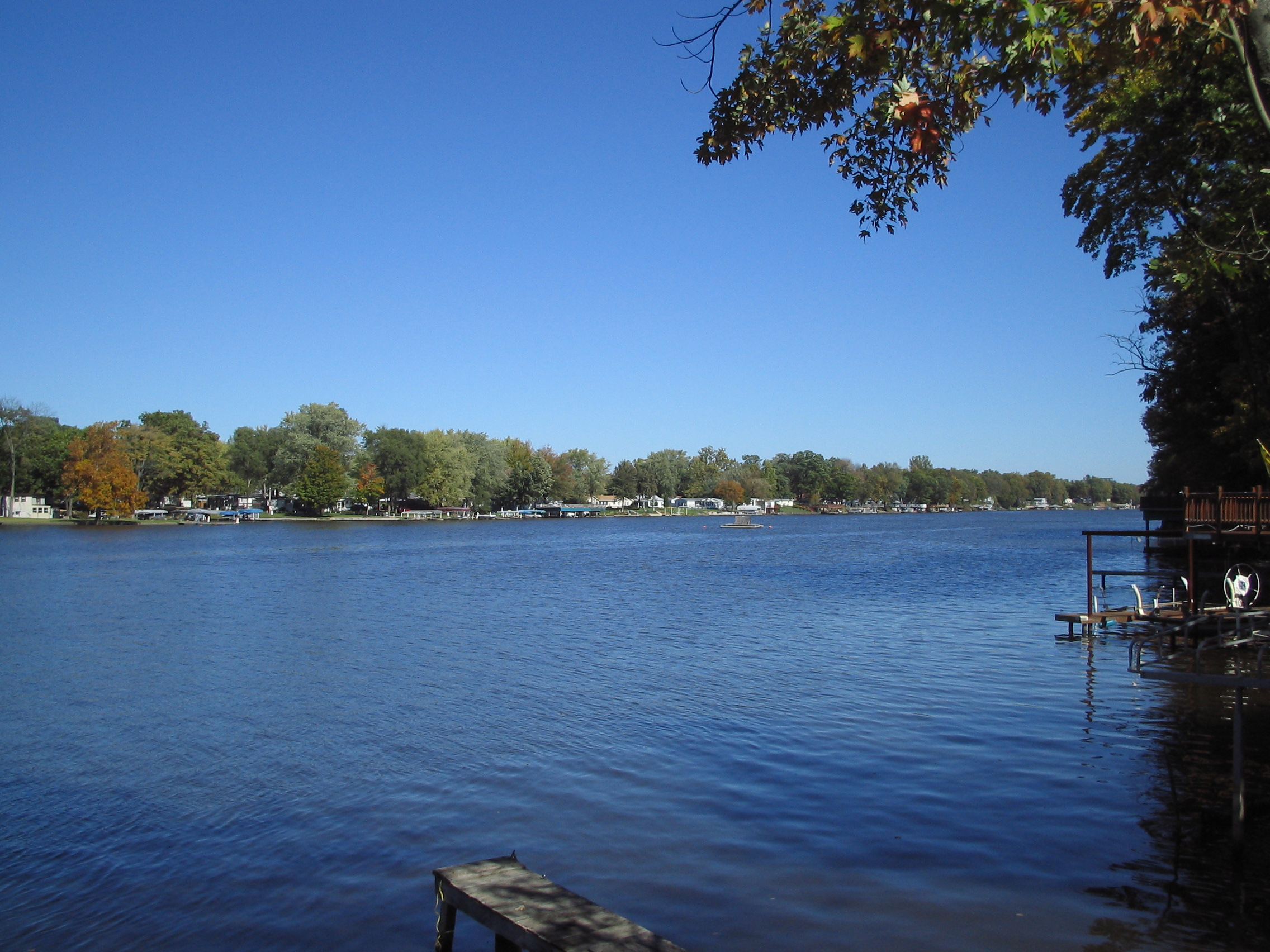
Lake Freeman

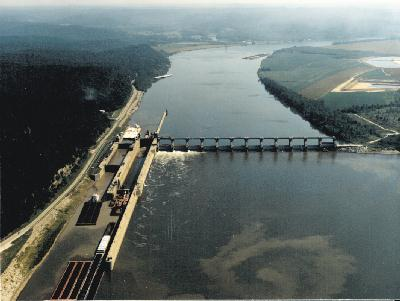
Cannelton Locks and Dam on the Ohio River

This list is incomplete. You can help Wikipedia by expanding it.

- Brookville Lake Dam, Brookville Lake, United States Army Corps of Engineers (USACE)
- Cagles Mill Dam, Cagles Mill Lake, USACE
- Cannelton Locks and Dam, Ohio River, USACE (between Indiana and Kentucky)
- Cecil M. Harden Lake Dam, Cecil M. Harden Lake, USACE
- Citizens Reservoir, Citizens Energy Group
- Eagle Creek Reservoir Dam, Eagle Creek Reservoir, City of Indianapolis Department of Public Works
- Geist Reservoir Dam, Geist Reservoir, Citizens Energy Group
- multiple dams, Gibson Lake, Duke Energy
- Glendale Reservoir, Dogwood Lake, Indiana Department of Natural Resources
- Grand Rapids Dam, unnamed reservoir of the Wabash River, USACE (abandoned)
- J. Edward Roush Lake Dam, J. Edward Roush Lake, USACE
- John T. Myers Locks and Dam, Ohio River, USACE (between Indiana and Kentucky)
- Lake Lemon Dam, Lake Lemon, City of Bloomington, Indiana
- Lake Wawasee, City of Warsaw, Indiana
- Markland Locks and Dam, Ohio River, USACE (between Indiana and Kentucky)
- McAlpine Locks and Dam, Ohio River, USACE (between Indiana and Kentucky)
- Middle Fork No. 4 Dam, Tipsaw Lake, United States Forest Service
- Mississinewa Lake Dam, Mississinewa Lake, USACE
- Monroe Lake Dam, Lake Monroe, USACE
- Morse Reservoir Dam, Morse Reservoir, Citizens Energy Group
- Newburgh Lock and Dam, Ohio River, USACE (between Indiana and Kentucky)
- Oakdale Dam, Lake Freeman, Northern Indiana Public Service Co.
- Patoka Dam, Patoka Lake, USACE
- Quick Creek Dam, Hardy Lake, State of Indiana
- Salamonie Lake Dam, Salamonie Lake, USACE
