= Arapawa goat =

Breed of goat

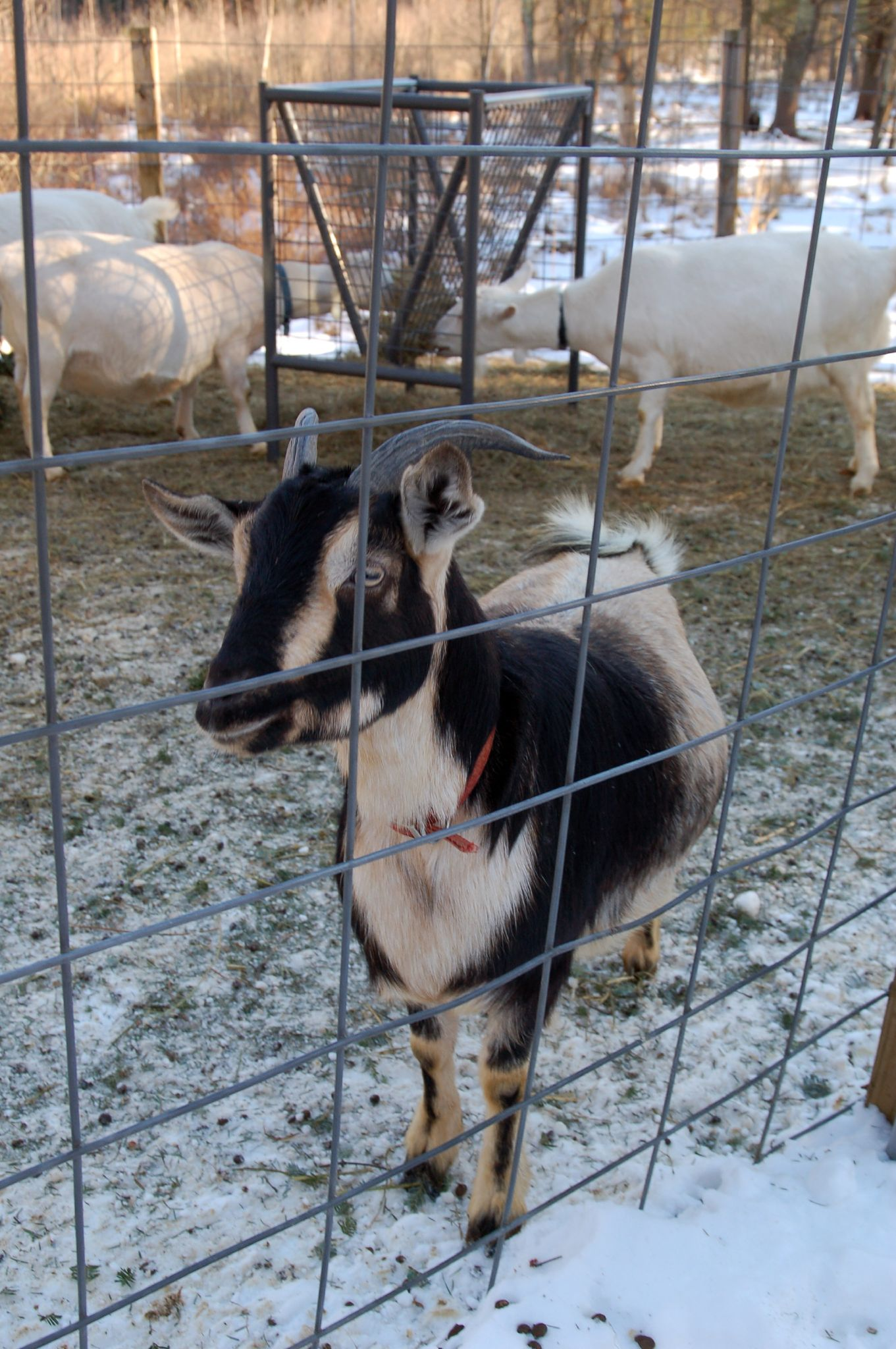
An Arapawa goat (foreground) with the breed's characteristic coloration

The Arapawa goat of New Zealand is a kind of feral goat of Arapawa Island in the Marlborough Sounds. It is, according to the American Livestock Breeds Conservancy critically close to extinction. A small, dual-purpose animal that was found isolated on the island of Arapawa in the Marlborough Sounds of New Zealand, there is evidence to support the belief that the Arapawa goats are direct descendants of the now extinct "Olde English" breed. In 1773 Captain James Cook released two goats on Arapawa Island's East Bay, and on a subsequent trip in 1777 he gave another pair to a Māori chief in nearby Ship Cove. A few decades later in 1839 a visitor to the whaling settlement on Arapawa Island wrote in his diary that it "swarmed" with goats.

Living peacefully on the island for nearly two centuries, threatened only by the occasional hunter, in the 1970s the little goats on Arapawa Island came under the threat of eradication. It was only through the dedication of Betty Rowe, a resident of Arapawa Island, that the Arapawa goat breed survived a cull by the New Zealand Government's Forest Service. With their priority being the protection of the native fauna and flora on Arapawa Island's reserve, a regular cull of the goats by the Department of Conservation continues.

By the dedication of Betty Rowe the goats of Arapawa Island were preserved when the New Zealand Department of Conservation wished to cull them entirely. Through direct action the goat still survives today but annually there is a cull. Many goats live in the Sanctuary set up on the island.

From six goats flown back to the UK in 2014 there are now herds being built up around the country. Efforts to breed the goat are on-going in the United States as well, along with other heritage breed animals the Conner Prairie Museum breeds a herd of Arapawa goat.

In January 2018, the BBC's Countryfile programme reported that there could be "as few as 150 of the goats World-wide".
