= William Conner =

American politician (1777–1855)

- Born: December 10, 1777; Tuscarawas County, Ohio
- Died: August 28, 1855 (aged 77); Noblesville, Indiana
- Spouse(s): Mekinges (m. 1802); Elizabeth (m. 1820)
- Children: 16 children
- Parent(s): Richard and Margaret (Boyer) Conner

Signature
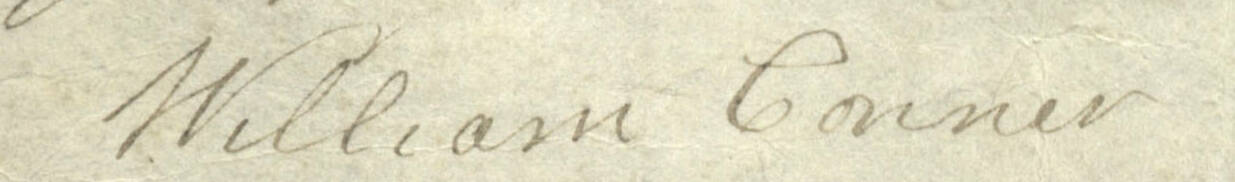

William Conner (December 10, 1777 – August 28, 1855) was an American trader, interpreter, military scout, community leader, entrepreneur, and politician. Although Conner initially established himself as a fur trader on the Michigan and Indiana frontiers, his business interests later expanded to include ownership of Indiana farms, mills, distilleries, and mercantile shops. He was also a land speculator. Conner served the American forces in several capacities during the War of 1812, and as an interpreter and witness at several treaty negotiations with Native American tribes that resulted in their removal from Indiana and established the state's geographical boundaries.

Conner founded Hamilton County, Indiana, and Noblesville, its seat of government. In addition, he established the nearby towns of Alexandria in Madison County and Strawtown in Hamilton County. Conner also served three non-consecutive terms as a state representative in the Indiana General Assembly between 1829 and 1837, and was a charter member of the Indiana Historical Society, established in 1830. Conner's brick home in Hamilton County has been restored and preserved as part of the Conner Prairie Interactive History Park, a living history museum in Fishers, Indiana, that is named for him and located on his former property.

== Early life ==
William Conner, the third son of Richard and Margaret (Boyer) Conner, was born on December 10, 1777. Richard Conner (1718–1807), born in Maryland, was a trader and tavern operator; Margaret Conner was a former white captive of the Shawnee, whom Richard ransomed for $200 and a promise to give their first-born son to the tribe so that they could marry. Richard and Margaret Conner spent the early years of their marriage living among the Shawnee in Ohio, where their first son, James, was born in 1771 and delivered to the Shawnee as agreed. Ongoing conflicts along the frontier forced the Conner family to leave the area. They traveled with Moravian missionaries and their Delaware (Lenape) and Shawnee converts to christianity. While still living in Ohio, James was ransomed from the Shawnee and returned to his parents. The Conner's second and third sons, John (1775–1826) and William, were also born in Ohio. (Sources disagree on whether William's birthplace was the Moravian settlement in Lichtenau in Coshocton County or at Schoenbrunn in what is now Tuscarawas County, Ohio.)

During the American Revolutionary War, the Conners joined a group of Moravians and their Native American followers in their British-forced removal to what became the state of Michigan. The Moravian missionaries and their followers returned to Ohio, but the Conner family remained at what was later named Macomb County, Michigan. Before his death in 1807 at the age of eighty-nine, Richard established a successful trading post in Michigan and acquired more than 400 acres (160 hectares) of land in the area. Although the Conner brothers received land from their father, by 1795 William was also trading with Native Americans around Saginaw Bay.

== Career ==
From his arrival in what became central Indiana in 1800 to the end of his life in 1855, William Conner was actively involved in the area's settlement and development, including founding Hamilton County, Indiana, platting the town of Noblesville in 1823, and donating land in the new town to establish it as the county's seat of government. Conner was also a trader, interpreter, and liaison on treaty negotiations with the Native Americans. Beginning in the 1820s, Conner used the wealth he had amassed from his ties to trading and the land cession treaties with Native Americans to become a landowner and successful business entrepreneur during Indiana's pioneer era.

=== Trader and interpreter ===
After the American Revolutionary War, Conner joined his older brother, John, in what later became the state of Indiana. Arriving in 1800, they worked as agents for Angus Mackintosh, a Canadian fur trader, and become officially licensed traders in 1801. The Conner brothers settled among the Delaware along the west fork of the White River in present-day central Indiana, and married Delaware women.

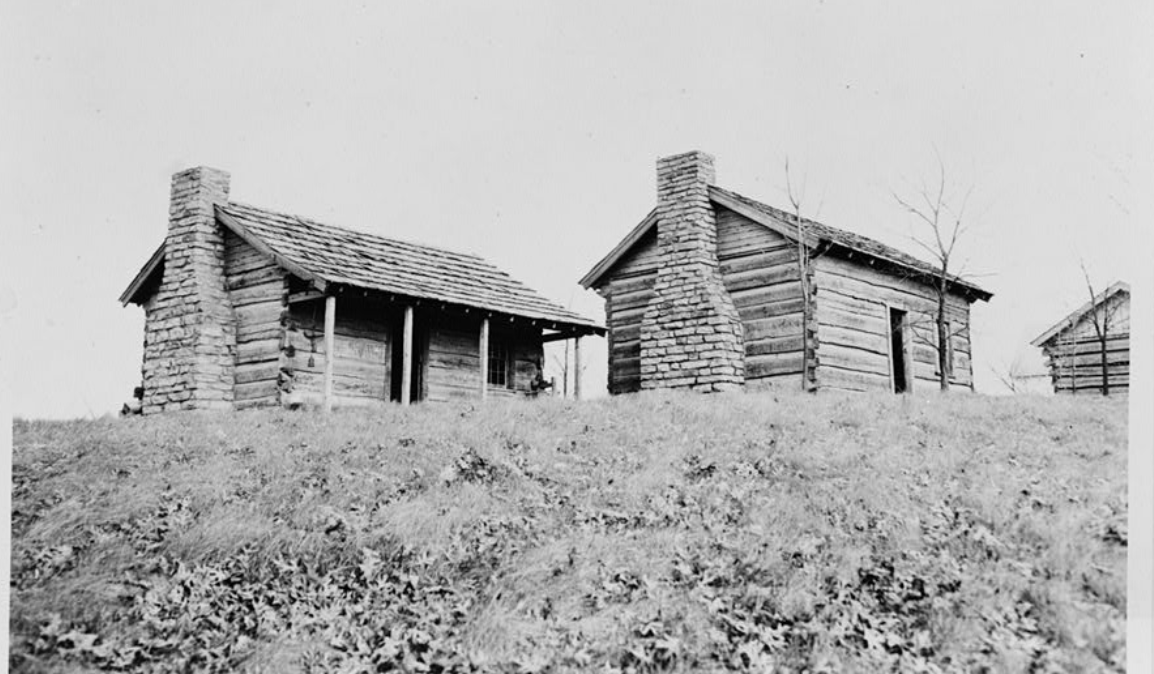
William Conner's Trading Post

In 1802 William married Mekinges (born in 1789), the daughter of the Delaware chief Kikthawenund, also known as William Anderson. At the time of their marriage, William would have been 24 or 25 years old; Mekinges would have been 12 or 13 years old. Chief Anderson was the namesake of present-day Anderson, Indiana. William and Mekinges Conner had six children and settled on 200 acres (81 hectares) of prairie land along the White River, where Conner built a log cabin that doubled as their home and a trading post. He also engaged in farming. The property remained Conner's home for thirty-five years. His brother, John, who settled near Cedar Grove, a white settlement in Indiana's Whitewater Valley area in 1803, acted as an intermediary to facilitate the sale of fur pelts and skins that William sent him. John also supplied trade goods and liquor for his brother's trading post customers.

In addition to operating a trading post, Conner and his business partner, William Marshall, profited from the land-cession treaties with the Native Americans and their removal from central Indiana. In 1811, during the War of 1812, Conner began serving in several capacities as a "soldier, scout, interpreter, and spy." He also helped make sure that the Delaware remained loyal to the Americans. In addition, Conner accompanied William Henry Harrison, the governor of the Indiana Territory, to the Battle of the Mississinewa in 1812 and was present at the Battle of the Thames in 1813. Conner was among those who helped identify the mutilated body of Tecumseh, who was killed in the battle. Conner continued to serve as an interpreter for the federal government during treaty negotiations after the war. The treaties ceded Native American lands to the federal government and removed the Native Americans living to reservation lands west of the Mississippi River.

Conner was involved in eight treaty negotiations, including service as an interpreter and liaison during the Treaty of St. Mary's negotiations in 1818. Under the terms of the treaty, the Delaware ceded their lands in central Indiana to the federal government in exchange for lands west of the Mississippi River, reimbursement for improvements made to their Indiana property, and annuity payments. The treaty was signed on October 3, 1818, and set the terms for the removal of the White River Delaware from Indiana, including Conner's wife, Mekinges, and their six children. Conner helped the treaty negotiators determine what the Native Americans would accept in exchange for their lands and urged the Native American leaders to agree to the treaty terms. In addition, Conner profited from the Native Americans' removal by providing them with supplies for their journey west.

It is not known if Conner intended to move west with his Delaware family after the Treaty of Saint Mary's was signed. "As early as 1818" Conner had filed a petition "to secure legal right to his land." In February 1820, six months before the Delaware removal from Indiana to reservation land west of the Mississippi River, Conner filed a petition that requested permission to remain on his land in Indiana and indicated that he would raise his Delaware family there, but the petition was tabled. As his family prepared to move west, Conner divided assets with Marshall, his business partner who decided to move west with the Delaware, and supplied his own family with horses and goods for the journey. (Conner provided Mekinges with sixty horses as her share of the trading business.) Conner accompanied Mekinges and their six children on the first day of their journey before leaving them to continue their trek west with the Delaware. He left no record to explain his decision to remain in Indiana.

=== Landowner and community leader ===
Conner used the wealth he amassed from his trading post and payments he received from his government service to re-establish himself in the white community of Hamilton County, Indiana. Three months after his Delaware family's departure, Conner married seventeen-year-old Elizabeth Chapman, the step-daughter of John Finch, a recent settler. Chapman was "possibly the only young, eligible white woman in the area." William and Elizabeth Conner had ten children over the next twenty-five years. One of his sons was Alexander H. Conner who was a lawyer and politician.

Beginning in the 1820s, Conner was a leader of community-building efforts in central Indiana and helped to facilitate its settlement. In 1822 Conner, his Delaware wife, Mekinges, and their heirs, were granted title in common to their Indiana homestead, although his Delaware wife and children no longer lived there. In 1823 Conner began the construction of a brick residence near the site of the family's log cabin on an estimated 1,000 acres (400 hectares) of land. The new home, where he resided with his second wife, Elizabeth, and their children, overlooked the White River and became a gathering place for various activities of the growing community. The Conner home became a stopover for travelers, a mail stop, and a meeting place for the newly established Hamilton County government.

With cash reserves from his earlier work as a trader and involvement in Native American treaty negotiations, Conner acquired multiple landholdings in central Indiana. He also became a land speculator, sometimes joining with others to acquire land that was subsequently sold at a high profit to new settlers. Conner and Josiah Polk platted Noblesville in 1823. The men also donated land in their new town for county government buildings that helped to secure its selection as the Hamilton County seat of government. Conner was also the founder of Strawtown, also in Hamilton County, and Alexandria in Madison County. In addition to his farming and livestock interests, Conner owned or invested in several stores, mills, and a distillery.

=== Politician ===
Conner was involved in local and state politics. He supported the Whig Party's policies and his political friends such as Jonathan Jennings, James Noble, and James B. Ray, among others. Conner served as Hamilton County's first treasurer. He also served three non-consecutive terms in the Indiana General Assembly in 1829–1830, 1831–1832, and 1836–1837. His interest in politics were motivated by business interests. Conner lobbied in support of internal improvements, such as new roads or the authorization of other public works that would benefit his business ventures.

=== Other interests ===
Around 1834 Conner became an agent for the Lawrenceburg and Indianapolis Railroad. His other civic interests included service as an interpreter for treaty negotiations with the Miami people in 1826 and the Potawatomi in 1832, as well as a guide for the Indiana militia as it prepared to participate in the Black Hawk War. (The war ended before the troops joined the fight.) Conner also became a charter member of the Indiana Historical Society, established in 1830.

== Later years ==
In 1837, at 60 years old, Conner moved his family to Noblesville, where he continued to oversee his varied business and agricultural interests. By the time of the move, Conner owned about 4,000 acres (1,600 hectares) of land in Hamilton County.

In his later years Conner continued to acquire land, invest in new business ventures, and increase his personal wealth. He also became a local authority on the area's history, especially its frontier and pioneer eras, and was known for his knowledge of Native American life.

== Death and legacy ==
Conner died on August 28, 1855, at the age of seventy-seven. He left a large estate, but no last will and testament. As a result, his heirs had to settle the issue of ownership of his land in the local courts, which disallowed Conner's Delaware heirs their claims to a share of his wealth. Conner was buried in Crownland Cemetery in Noblesville, Indiana. His widow, Elizabeth, moved to Indianapolis in 1864; she resided at 472 North East Street until her death in 1892. Little information has been reported about Conner's first wife, Mekinges, after she left Indiana in 1820.

Conner's legacy is linked to the important trading relations that he and his brother, John, established with the Native Americans along the west fork of the White River in the early 1800s. After living among the Delaware for nearly twenty years and serving as an agent, liaison, and interpreter, Conner made a personal fortune from this relationship that he expanded into further success as a landowner, merchant, and business entrepreneur.

Conner's wealth and influence led to his role as a central Indiana community-builder and founder of Hamilton County, Indiana. Conner and Josiah F. Polk platted the town of Noblesville in 1823 and helped established it as the seat of Hamilton County government. Conner also founded Strawtown in Hamilton County and Alexandria in Madison County. In addition to his influence on the development of central Indiana, Conner's best-known legacy is his restored former homestead in Hamilton County, Indiana.

== William Conner's house ==
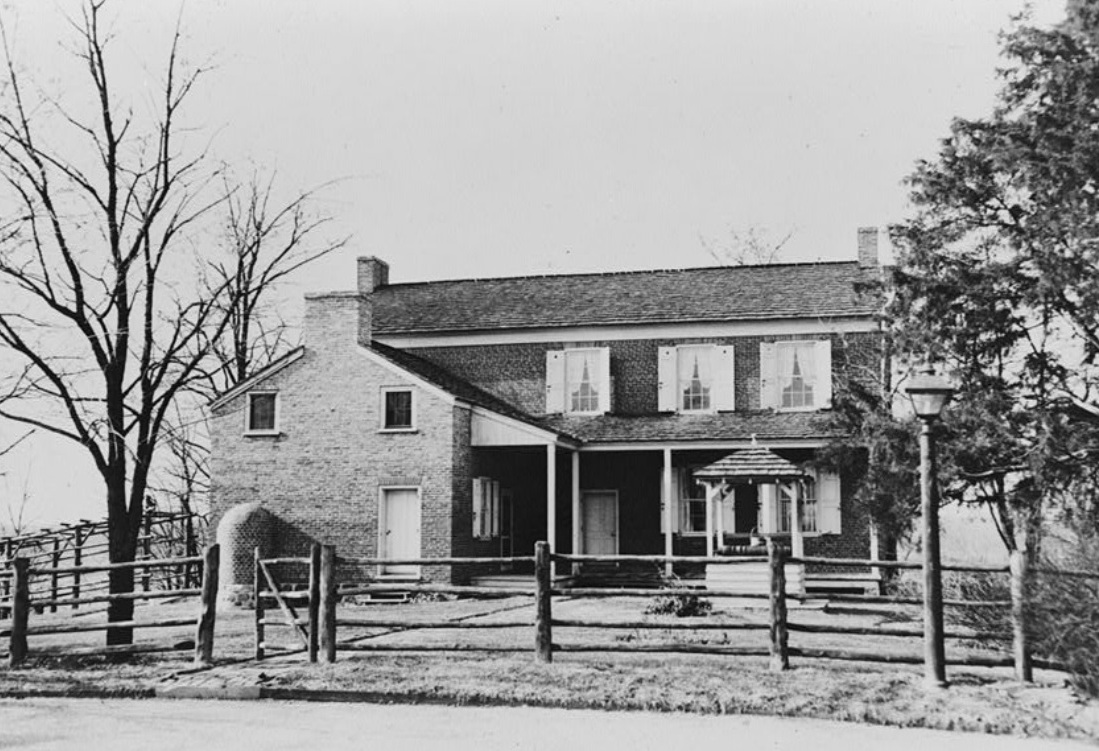
William Conner house

In 1823, Conner built a two-story Federal style brick house on the terrace edge of the west fork of the White River, about 4 miles (6.4 km) south of Noblesville, in Hamilton County, Indiana. It is believed to be one of the first brick buildings built in central Indiana. Seven of William and Elizabeth Conner's ten children were born in the home. In addition, the Conner house was used as the meeting place for the Hamilton County commissioners and other county officials, as well as a circuit court and a postal office during the county's early days.

Conner lived in the house until 1837, but William and Elizabeth Conner's children and their families or their tenants continued to reside in the house until ownership pass outside the family in 1871. (In the 1860s, Conner's Delaware children were unsuccessful in gaining title to their family's Indiana land.)

Indianapolis pharmaceutical executive Eli Lilly Jr. purchased the Conner home and farm in 1934 and immediately began work to stabilize and restore the severely deteriorated house. Local architect Robert Frost Daggett and contractor Charles Latham supervised the stabilization and restoration work, as well as the addition of a new, six-columned porch overlooking the White River. (The porch was removed in a later renovation.) Lilly donated the house and farm to Earlham College in 1963 and the property became part of the Conner Prairie Interactive History Park. The Conner home, which was listed on the National Register of Historic Places in 1980, has undergone subsequent restoration to enhance its representation of an 1820s-era house and is open to Conner Prairie visitors.
