= Fishers High School =

Public high school in Fishers, Indiana, US

Location
- 13000 Promise Road; Fishers, Indiana 46038; United States; 39°58′40″N 85°58′00″W

Information
- Type: Public high school
- Established: 2006 (Re-established)
- School district: Hamilton Southeastern Schools
- CEEB code: 151041
- Principal: Kyle Goodwin
- Staff: 168.99 (on an FTE basis)
- Faculty: 134
- Grades: 9-12
- Enrollment: 3,664 (2023-2024)
- Student to teacher ratio: 21.68
- Color
- Athletics conference: Hoosier Crossroads Conference
- Nickname: Tigers
- Rival: Hamilton Southeastern
- Newspaper: Fishers Tiger Times
- Yearbook: Tiger Tracks
- Website: fhs.hseschools.org
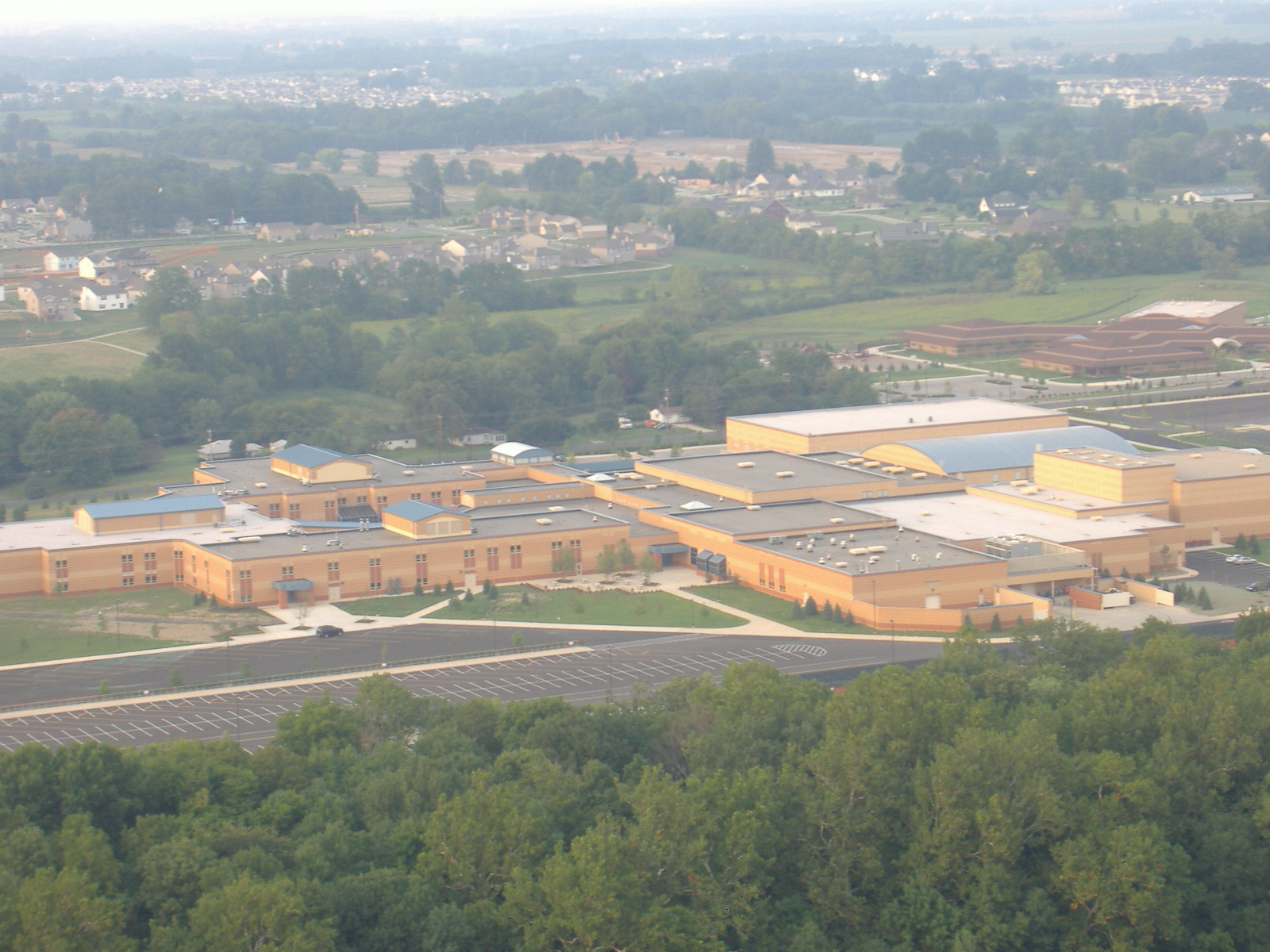

Fishers High School (FHS) is one of two high schools in Hamilton Southeastern Schools in Fishers, Indiana, United States.

== History ==
The original Fishers High School was located at Lantern Road and 116th Street, where the current Fishers Elementary School stands, but the school was demolished in 1969 after the opening of Hamilton Southeastern High School. In 2003, the current school opened as a freshman campus but, in 2007, the school opened a second wing which allowed for grades 9–12 to occupy the building. A third wing was completed following the end of the 2015 school year as a College and Career Academy.

Due to the COVID-19 contagion, FHS converted to online learning on April 14, 2020, for the remainder of the 2019–2020 school year. The school district resumed on-site classes in the 2020–2021 school year.

== Academics ==
According to the 2024 U.S. News & World Report Best High School Rankings, FHS ranks 10th in Indiana and 653th among all high schools in the United States. Sixty-five percent of FHS students took one or more Advanced Placement exams, and 45 percent passed such an exam. Sixty-one percent of FHS students achieved math proficiency and seventy-eight percent achieved reading proficiency. In the College Readiness Index Rank, FHS is 1,248th out of 17,792 ranked high schools. For College Curriculum Breadth Index Rank it is ranked 1,236th, and 669th for Math and Reading Proficiency Rank. It's Math and Reading Performance Rank is 2,461. The FHS student-teacher ratio is 23–1.

In the 2019–2020 school year, FHS had 10 National Merit Scholarship Finalists.

== Athletics ==
- Baseball (boys)
  - 2018 Baseball Champion (4A)
- Basketball (boys & girls)
  - Boys 2024 State Champion
- Cheerleading
- Cross country (boys & girls)
  - 2007 Boys state champion
- Football (boys)
  - 2010 State champion
- Golf (boys & girls)
- Lacrosse (boys & girls)
- Soccer (boys & girls)
  - Girls 2014 State champion
- Softball (girls)
- Swimming (boys & girls)
- Tennis (boys & girls)
- Track and Field (boys & girls)
  - Boys 2024 State Champion
- Volleyball (girls & boys)
- Wrestling (boys)

== Performing Arts ==
=== Marching Band ===
The Fishers Marching Tiger Band is a 250-person ensemble that performs a competitive halftime show at football games and local/national festivals. The Tiger Band is an ISSMA State Finalist, BOA Regional Finalist, and BOA Grand National Finalist. The band performed in the 2023 Macy's Thanksgiving Day Parade.

The band has also performed in the Philadelphia Thanksgiving Day Parade (2015), the Hollywood Christmas Parade (2017), the Walt Disney World Main Street Parade (2019), and the Macy's Thanksgiving Day Parade (2023).

=== Show Choir ===
FHS has two competitive show choirs, the mixed-gender "Electrum" and the women's-only "Sound".

Electrum performs both concert and show choir literature. Formed in 2017, they compete both at show choir competitions throughout the state and at ISSMA State Contests. In 2019, Electrum received 5th in State honors at the ISSMA Show Choir State Finals. Other show choir and concert choir accomplishments include: Best vocal performance, best visual performance, four-time Tier 2 Grand Champion (2018, 2019), four-time ISSMA State Finalist for Concert Choir (2012, 2015, 2017) and in 2019 placed 6th in State. In 2020, Electrum earned Tier 1 Grand Championship at Center Grove Best of the Midwest as well as capturing Best Vocals, Best Choreography, Best General Effect Overall, and Best Costumes Overall at the competition.

Sound is an advanced treble choir. They perform both concert and show choir literature and consist of 59 students ranging from freshmen to seniors. They compete both at show choir competitions and ISSMA State Contests, earning a spot in the State Show Choir Finals twice in their 14-year history. In 2019, Sound achieved 5th in State honors at the ISSMA Show Choir Finals! Other show choir invitational achievements include: Best Vocals, Best Visuals, People's Choice and Grand Champion. In April 2020, Sound was featured in Productions Magazine. In 2021, Sound earned two more Tier 1 Grand Championships at Center Grove Best of the Midwest and the Avon Vocal Invitational. Sound was undefeated during the 2021 season in the Best Visuals caption, capturing that award at all three competitions. Sound received the Best Vocals caption at the Avon Vocal Invitational. Sound also captured the Best Overall Effect Award at the Center Grove Best of the Midwest Competition. Sound was named State Champions at the ISSMA Show Choir Championship in 2022, 2023, and 2024.

The school also hosts its own show choir competition, the Fishers Silver Spotlight Invitational. The event has been held yearly since 2011.

== Notable alumni ==
- Jeremy Chinn, NFL safety and linebacker; played college football at Southern Illinois and was selected in the 3rd round of the 2020 NFL Draft by the Carolina Panthers, later joined the Washington Commanders
- Khobie Martin, college football running back for the Indiana Hoosiers
- Landon Morris (class of 2021), college football tight end for the Wake Forest Demon Deacons
- Craig Yoho, baseball player professional baseball pitcher for the Milwaukee Brewers of Major League Baseball; drafted in the 8th round of the 2023 MLB draft

== See also ==
- List of high schools in Indiana
