= Conner Prairie =

Historic house in Indiana, United States

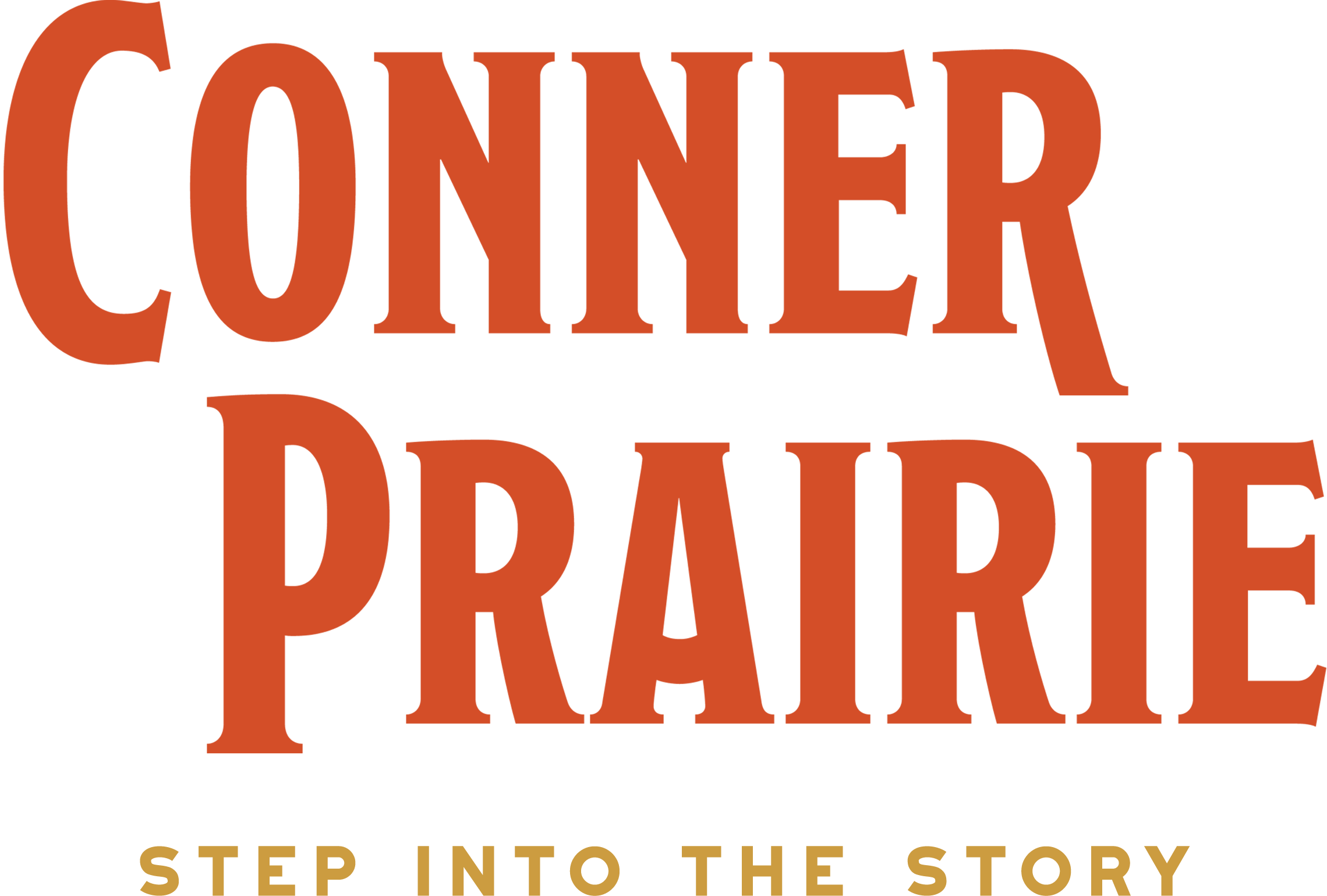
- Established: 1934
- Location: East bank of White River, Hamilton County, Indiana
- Coordinates: 39°59′04″N 86°01′44″W
- Type: Living history museum
- Visitors: 414,342 (2019)
- Directors: Norman O. Burns, II
- Website: www.connerprairie.org
- William Conner House
- U.S. National Register of Historic Places
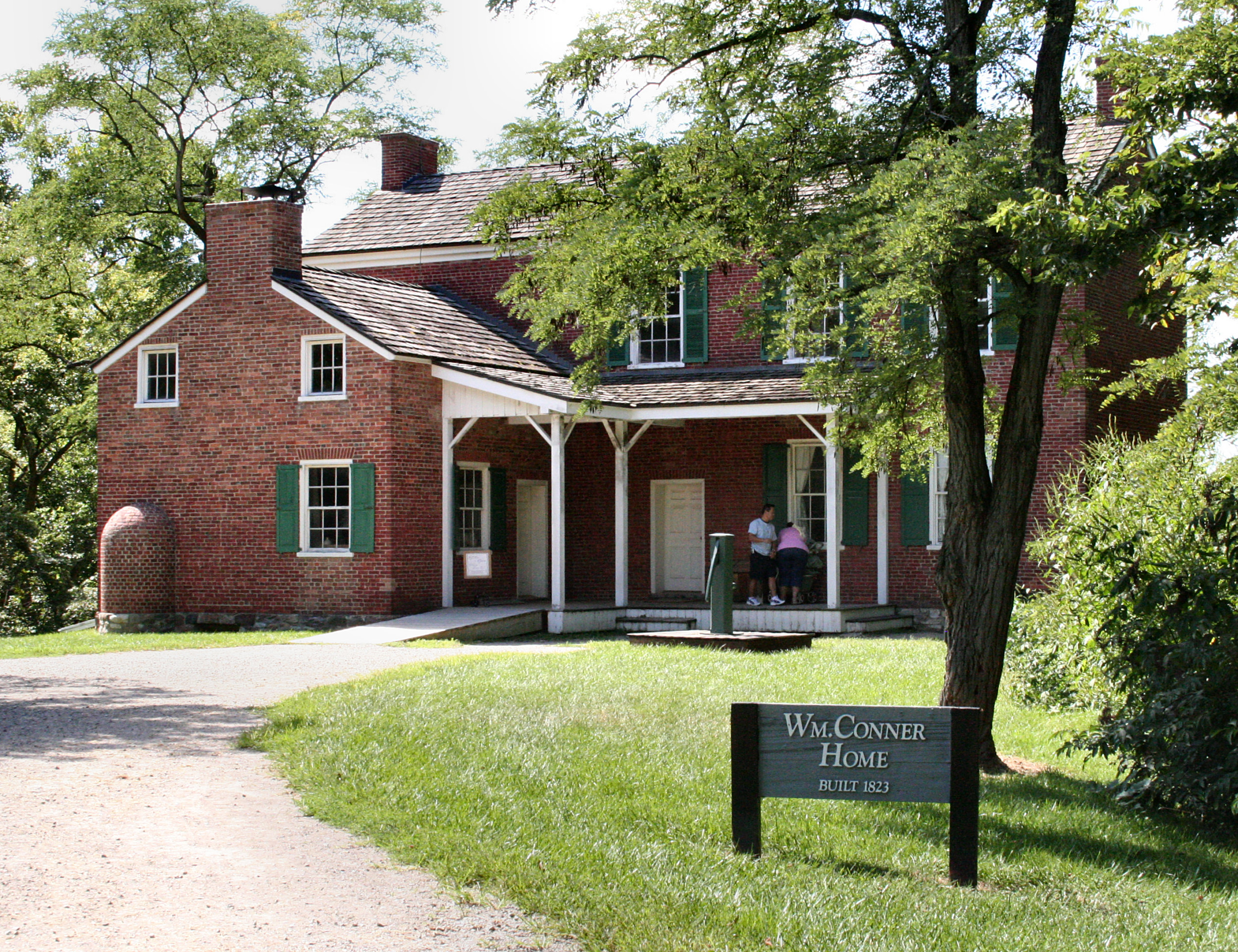
- William Conner House

- Location within Indiana Location within the United States
- Location: 13400 Allisonville Road; Fishers, Indiana
- Coordinates: 39°59′3.5″N 86°1′52.8″W
- Built: 1823
- Architectural style: Federal
- NRHP reference No.: 80000038
- Added to NRHP: February 8, 1980

Conner Prairie is a living history museum in Fishers, Indiana, United States, which preserves the William Conner home. The home is listed on the National Register of Historic Places, and the museum recreates 19th-century life along the White River. The museum also hosts several programs and events, including outdoor performances by the Indianapolis Symphony Orchestra and summer camps.

== History and development ==
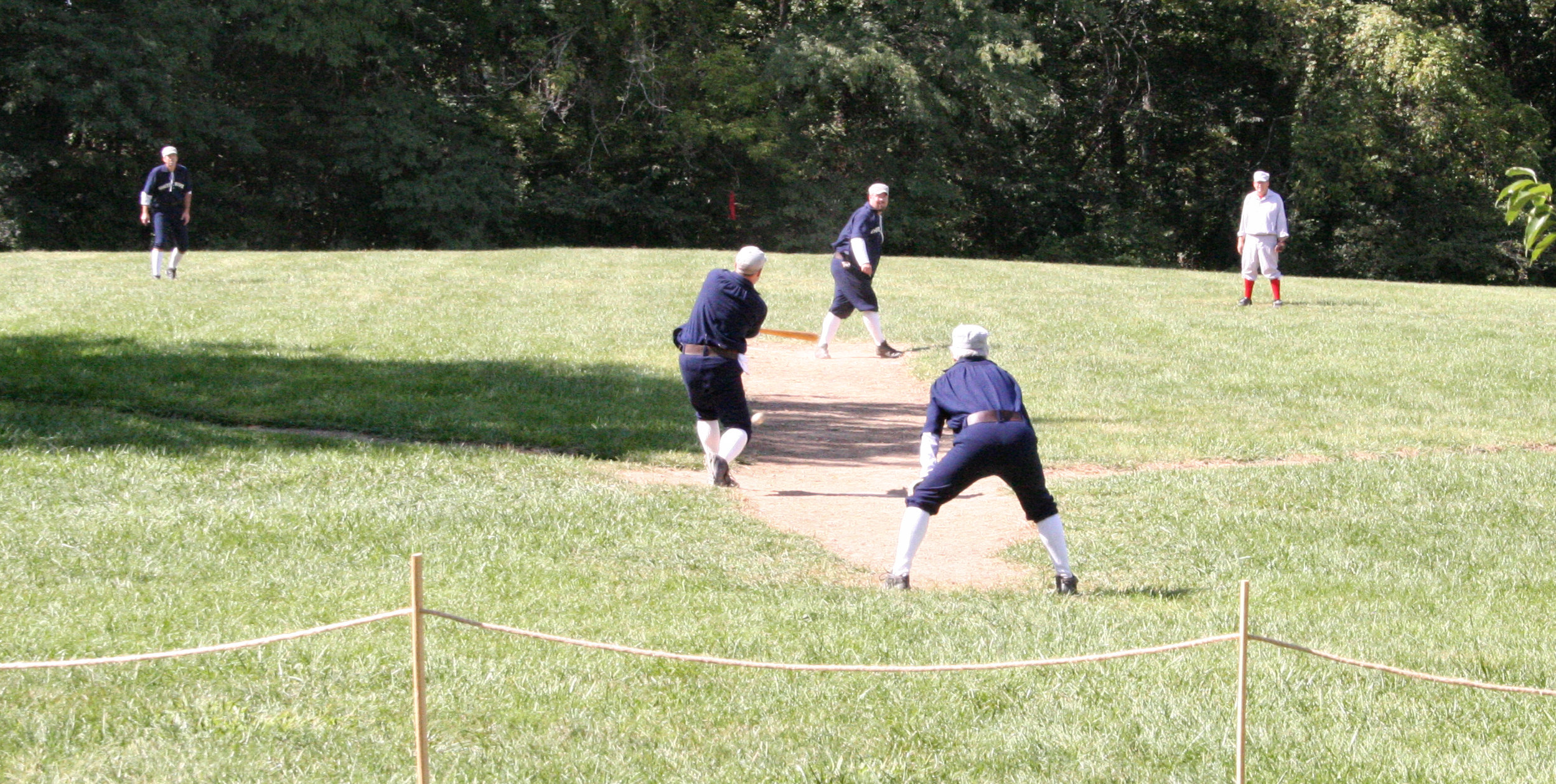
1886 baseball demonstration at Liberty Corner

The property and William Conner house were purchased by pharmaceutical executive Eli Lilly in 1933 or 1934. With the aim of connecting "people with history in ways that books cannot," Lilly restored the house, and opened it to visitors. The property was initially known as Conner Prairie Farm. Lilly appointed resident Vern H. Fisher manager. By 1940, Lilly had added several structures to the property, including a still, a loom house, and a trading post. After Fisher's death in 1942, Tillman Bubenzer was appointed farm manager until 1977. The farm was unprofitable and depended on Lilly's support.

In 1964, Lilly transferred the house and its outbuildings to a charitable trust of $150 million. Earlham College, a Quaker liberal-arts college in Richmond, Indiana, was named as trustee. In transferring the property to the college, Lilly provided an endowment for its operation and continued to offer support with the provision that the property would be open to the public. He also transferred 1,371 acres (555 ha) of surrounding farmland to the college, suggesting that Earlham could sell the land and use its proceeds for the museum. Earlham elected to retain the farmland and expand the museum, constructing an 1836 village (Prairietown) with funds provided by Lilly for the purpose. The museum grew in scope and popularity, and attendance increased by 22 percent from 1975 to 1976.

In 1999, tensions began to develop between the board of directors and the college about the museum's governance and the college's financial policies. The dispute culminated in Earlham's dismissal of the museum's president and board of directors in June 2003. The Indiana attorney general intervened and, after a lengthy and contentious dispute, a settlement was reached in which Earlham resigned as trustee of the charitable trust, the Lilly endowment was allocated between Conner Prairie and the college, and the museum became independent. Conner Prairie has a board of directors, and maintains its finances and endowment fund. In 2009, it joined the Smithsonian Affiliations program. After restructuring, the museum had an endowment of $91 million and an operating budget of $9 million by 2011.

On December 17, 2010, Conner Prairie received the National Medal for Museum and Library Service and a $10,000 prize in a ceremony at the White House. The museum opened another exhibit in June 2011, "The 1863 Civil War Journey: Raid on Indiana". This exhibit documents Morgan's Raid with live action, video, and interactive activities. The installation and design of the exhibit required a $4.3 million investment.

== Layout and concept ==
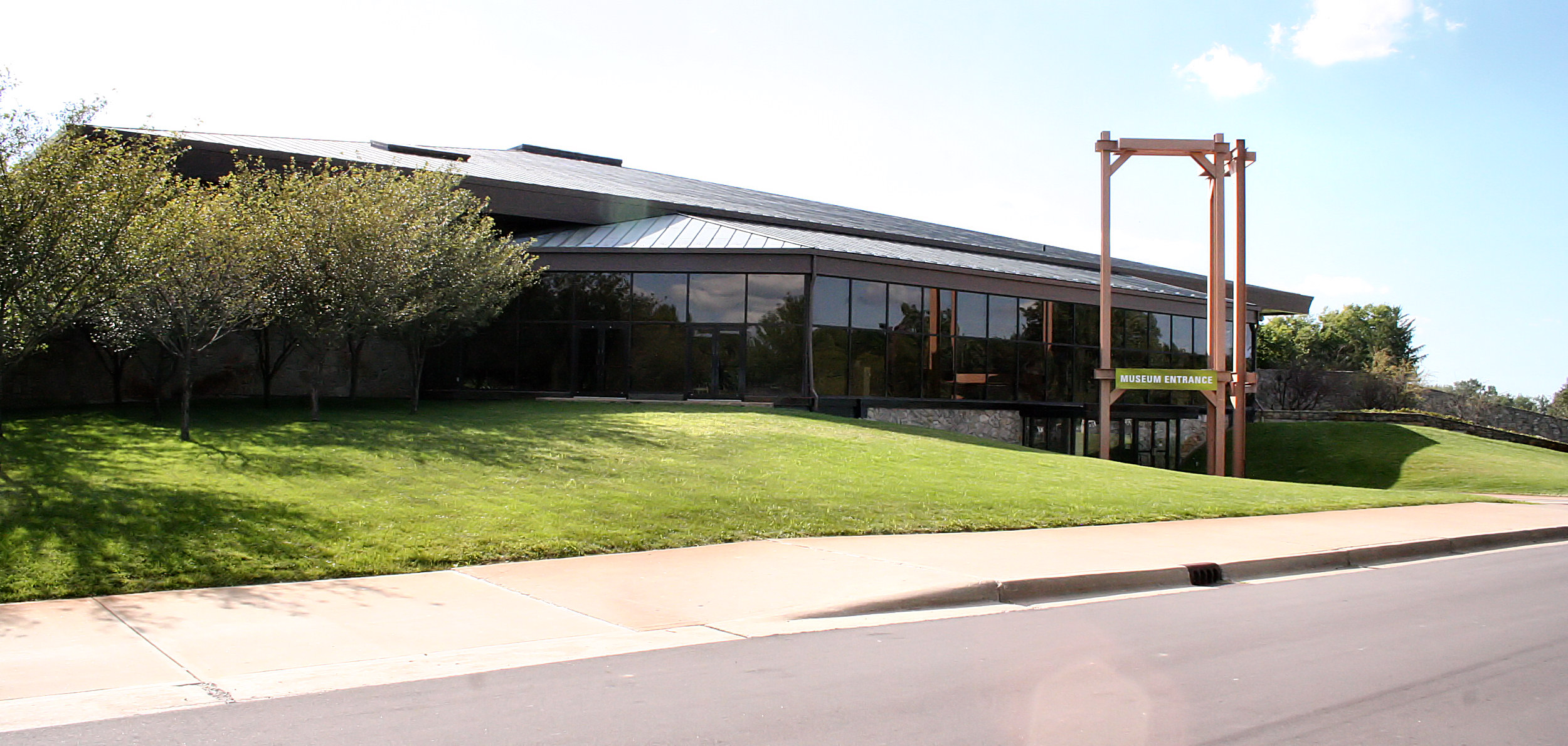
Welcome Center exterior

The museum grounds are divided into several sections in which different historical eras are recreated in a living timeline. Staff in historical clothing demonstrate the way early inhabitants of the area lived. They explain their lifestyles in character while performing chores such as cooking, chopping wood, making pottery, and tending to animals. Visitors are often invited to join in the activities.

The museum's main building, the Welcome Center, contains the entrance lobby, ticket-sales counter, "Create.Connect" (history and science exhibits), Discovery Station/Craft Corner indoor play area, banquet hall, and gift shop. The gift shop sells pottery made by the museum's costumed staff in addition to more conventional souvenirs.

== Attractions ==
Conner Prairie has several permanent attractions and a number of semi-regular events, including monthly programs such as "Taste the Past", a Headless Horseman ride in the autumn, candlelight tours, and a country fair. It hosts American Civil War reenactments, Hearthside Suppers, and Christmas events and dinners.

=== Create Connect ===
Create Connect is an indoor attraction, open year-round, that "Celebrates Hoosier Innovation". This attraction offers activities such as building a windmill, experimenting with circuits, building a model plane, and building a chain reaction. The area consists of smaller exhibits that explore wind energy at the turn of the century, flight in the early 1900s, rural electrification in the 1930s, and the role of science during the space race of the 1950s and 1960s. The area is usually facilitated by a blue-shirt staff member, but may occasionally have a first-person interpreter dressed in costume.

=== Makesmith Workshop ===
Makesmith Workshop's theme changes through the seasons. In the winter, it focuses on textiles; in the summer, it turns to metalworking; and in the spring and fall it changes to woodworking. Children of all ages can participate in basic trade activities such as sewing on a button, hammering in a nail, or molding a piece of metal.

=== Animal Encounters ===
Animal Encounters is a functioning barn on Conner Prairie grounds across from the Conner House. It houses several heritage breed livestock that the museum helps to conserve, including Arapawa goats, Tunis sheep and American rabbits. Elsewhere on the campus they also have a herd of English Longhorn cattle and Ossabaw Hogs. The breeds chosen are based on similar descriptions to livestock that were raised in 19th century Indiana to match their 1836 living history village. The barn allows guests to familiarize themselves with and become comfortable around livestock, develop an appreciation for where food comes from and understand why conserving rare genetics is important for modern agriculture. The barn's activities include milking goats, collecting eggs from chickens, and shearing sheep.

=== William Conner House ===
Built in 1823, the William Conner House is a two-story, Federal-style brick residence on the terrace edge of the west fork of the White River. It is believed to be one of the first brick buildings built in central Indiana. Seven of William and Elizabeth Conner's ten children were born in the home. The house was used as a meeting place for the Hamilton County commissioners, other county officials, and the circuit court, and contained a post office in the county's early days. Conner lived in the house until 1837. William and Elizabeth's children and their families (or their tenants) continued to live in the house until its ownership left the family in 1871. During the 1860s, Conner's Lenape children with Mekinges Conner (his first wife) unsuccessfully attempted to gain title to the family's Indiana land.

Subsequent owners lived in the house until 1934, when Eli Lilly Jr. purchased Conner's former farm and the then-dilapidated house. Lilly, president and CEO of Eli Lilly and Company and president of the Indiana Historical Society, intended to restore the house and turn it into a museum. Local architect Robert Frost Daggett and contractor Charles Latham supervised the home's stabilization and restoration and the addition of a six-columned porch overlooking the White River (the porch was removed in a later renovation). Lilly donated the house and farm to Earlham College in 1963, and it became part of Conner Prairie. In 1980, the house was listed on the National Register of Historic Places.

The Conner House has undergone additional restoration, and is preserved as representative of an 1820s home. Its function as a house museum continues to evolve.

=== 1863 Civil War Journey ===
"The 1863 Civil War Journey: Raid on Indiana" documents Morgan's Raid, the longest raid of the Civil War behind enemy lines and the only Civil War battle event in Indiana. Using live action, video, and other interactive activities, the Civil War Journey documents the raid through the eyes of historical figures Attia Porter, Confederate brigadier general John Hunt Morgan, and Albert Cheetham. Visitors can walk through a reconstruction of the town of Dupont and be a part of the Civil War; children can board a replica steamboat and play in the water area.

The Civil War Journey is set in Dupont, a southern Indiana town which was invaded by Confederate raiders in 1863. Visitors can stop by the Mayfield and Nichols dry-goods store, the Porter family home, a telegraph station, a soldiers' camp and a field hospital. Although much of the Civil War Journey is presented with modern technology, historic interpreters also play a large part in its presentation. Visitors can talk to soldiers from the 103rd Indiana Regiment and residents of Dupont, who share their views of the war and Morgan's raid. Reenactors of Union and Confederate units may be present, painting a more in-depth portrait of the raid.

=== Prairietown ===
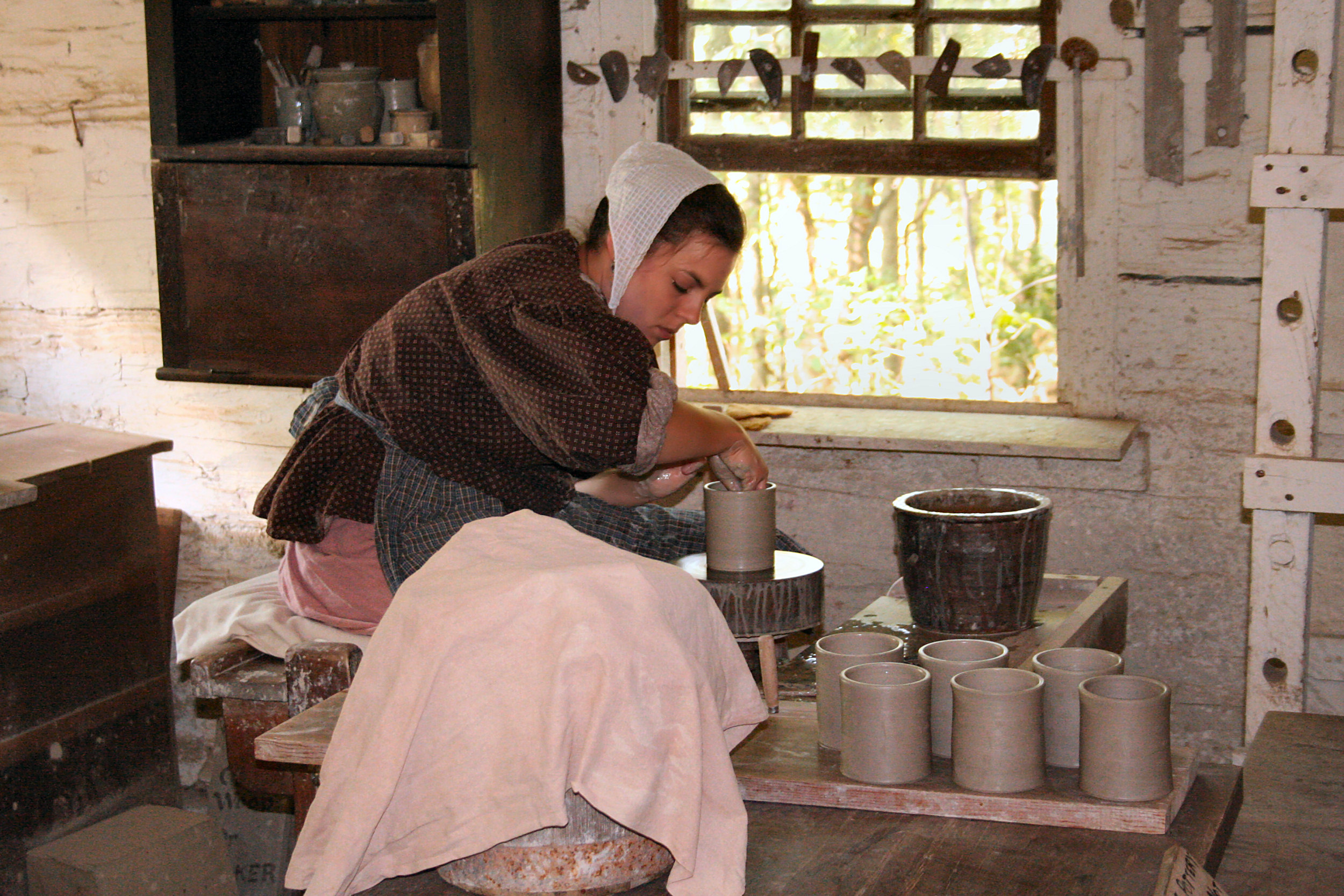
1836 pottery wheel demonstration in Prairietown

Prairietown is a recreated 1836 pioneer community. Unlike the Civil War Journey, Prairietown is not an actual Indiana settlement but a recreation of what such a settlement may have been like in the early days of Indiana statehood. In addition to several homes, Prairietown has blacksmith and pottery shops, an inn, a doctor's office, a store, a carpentry shop, and a schoolhouse. Visitors arriving early in the day can help with morning chores, and all visitors are invited to play a role in Prairietown society with a character card found at the entrance.

Prairietown aims to demonstrate what day-to-day life was like for residents of frontier Indiana. Historic interpreters in period clothing, presenting first-person impressions of the people of Prairietown, offer a unique perspective. Although these interpreters will not discuss events (or inventions) after 1836, blue-shirted museum employees can help visitors approach Prairietown from a modern point of view.

=== 1859 Balloon Voyage ===
On June 6, 2009, Conner Prairie opened its 1859 Balloon Voyage, which allows visitors to take 15-minute rides in a tethered balloon to a height of 377 feet (115 m). The balloon is filled with 210,000 cubic feet (5,900 m^{3}) of helium and is 105 feet (32 m) tall, making it the world's largest tethered gas passenger balloon. Its gondola can carry up to about twenty people, and the balloon (manufactured by Aerophile) can lift up to 4.5 tons. It is one of five such balloons in the United States.

An educational exhibit accompanies the balloon ride, recreating a Lafayette street and including hands-on, interactive elements that teach the historical context and technology of ballooning. The attraction is based on the August 17, 1859, trip by John Wise, who made the first airmail delivery in the United States – 25 miles (40 km), from Lafayette to Crawfordsville, Indiana – of 123 letters and 23 circulars.

Sunset and nighttime flights are made on weekends when the Indianapolis Symphony Orchestra plays its Symphony on the Prairie summer series. The balloon ride is weather-permitting, and does not operate in high winds. With the rest of the park, it is open from April to October.

=== Lenape Indian Camp ===
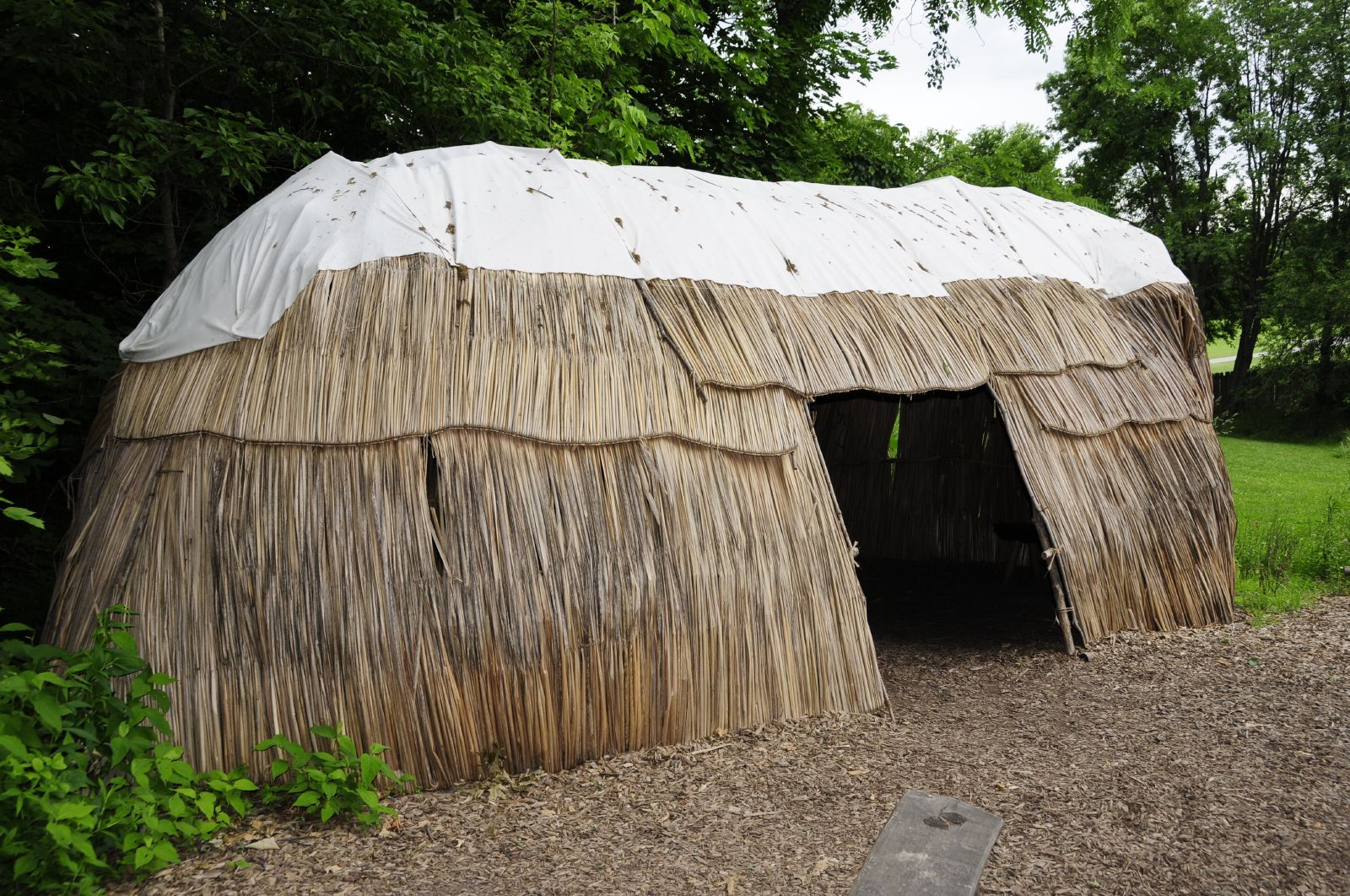
Wigwam in Lenape Indian Camp.

The Lenape (Delaware) Indian Camp recreates bark and cattail-mat wigwams and a fur trade camp with a log cabin, as well as Lenape trades such as pottery, cooking, gardening, hunting, games, beading, weaving, and more. Visitors can learn how the Lenape Indians lived in Indiana, hunting and trapping animals to trade with European fur traders. There are tomahawk throws once every day and pendant-making once a day in the summer as well as bracelet-making with beads in the winter.

== Programs and events ==
=== Camps ===
Conner Prairie offers many different types of summer camps including, Adventure Camp, Science Camp For Girls, Science Camp For Boys, Archaeology Camp, Photography Camp, Maker Camp, and Art Camp. In this camp, participants use diverse media to create various types of art.

=== Preschool on the Prairie ===
Preschool on the Prairie, which opened Fall 2019, is held in the president's house and is suitable for children ages 3–5.

=== Indianapolis Symphony Orchestra ===
The museum is the summer home of the Indianapolis Symphony Orchestra. The Friday-Saturday Symphony on the Prairie concert series attracts over 100,000 concertgoers per year, a substantial portion of Conner Prairie's visitor count. There are tables and chairs set up on the prairie and there is an option to bring a blanket and sit on the grass.

=== Follow the North Star ===
For 20 years, Conner Prairie hosted the "Follow the North Star" experience, a slavery reenactment experience in which students as young as 12 years old would participate in a recreation of the Underground Railroad. In 2003, the program won the national award for Excellence in Programming from the American Alliance of Museums, as well as the national Award of Merit from the American Association for State and Local History in 2012. However, organizations such as the American Civil Liberties Union and academics have criticized the reenactment, saying it "presents a sanitized version of history, lacks depth in connecting the impact of slavery to present day race relations, and can traumatize children, specifically children of color." In 2019, Conner Prairie announced they would "reimagine" the experience in response to the criticisms. The program was subsequently canceled altogether.

== See also ==
- List of museums in Indiana
- List of open-air and living history museums in the United States
