= Hamilton Southeastern Schools =

School district in Indiana

Coordinates: 39°59′05.0″N 85°59′42.6″W

Hamilton Southeastern Schools (HSES)
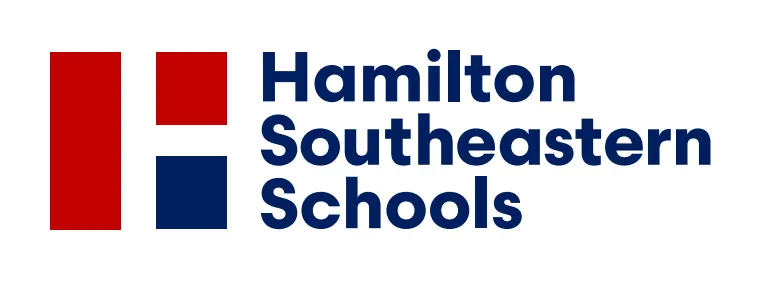

Location
- 13485 Cumberland Rd; Fishers, Indiana Central Indiana; Hamilton County United States

District information
- Type: Public
- Grades: K–12
- Superintendent: Patrick Mapes (resigning April 13, 2026)

Students and staff
- Students: 21,599 (2018–19)
- Teachers: 1,304 (2016–17)
- Staff: 1,417

Other information
- Graduation Rate: 97.1% (2017–18)
- 2016 Graduates: 1,374
- Website: Official website

Hamilton Southeastern Schools is the school district for students residing in Fishers, Indiana, and portions of neighboring Noblesville, Indiana. The district consists of thirteen elementary schools (K–4), four intermediate schools (5–6), four junior high schools (7–8), and two high schools (9–12). Hamilton Southeastern is home to the Hamilton Southeastern Royals and the Fishers Tigers.

Hamilton Southeastern is one of the largest school corporations in Indiana, serving 21,299 students in the 2023–24 academic year. The district is known for its consistently high academic ratings. Fourteen of the twenty-two schools in the district are four star schools as rated by the Indiana Department of Education. Geist Elementary School was named a 2016 Blue Ribbon School by the US Department of Education, an award only given to 329 schools nationally. The district had a 23.1% higher passing rate on the math/English combined ISTEP+ tests when compared to the state average in 2006–07.

== Elementary (grades K–4) ==
- Brooks School Elementary – Bears
- Cumberland Road Elementary – Roadrunners
- Deer Creek Elementary – Stars
- Fall Creek Elementary – Fish
- Fishers Elementary – Tigers
- Geist Elementary – Gators
- Harrison Parkway Elementary – Patriots
- Hoosier Road Elementary – Rockets
- Lantern Road Elementary – Leopards
- New Britton Elementary – Bulldogs
- Sand Creek Elementary – Cougars
- Southeastern Elementary – Explorers
- Thorpe Creek Elementary – Cardinals

== Defunct elementary schools ==
- Durbin Elementary – Dogs (Closed 2022)

== Intermediate (grades 5–6) ==
- Fall Creek Intermediate – Falcons
- Riverside Intermediate – Golden Hawks
- Sand Creek Intermediate – Sharks
- Hamilton Southeastern Intermediate – Panthers

== Junior high (grades 7–8) ==
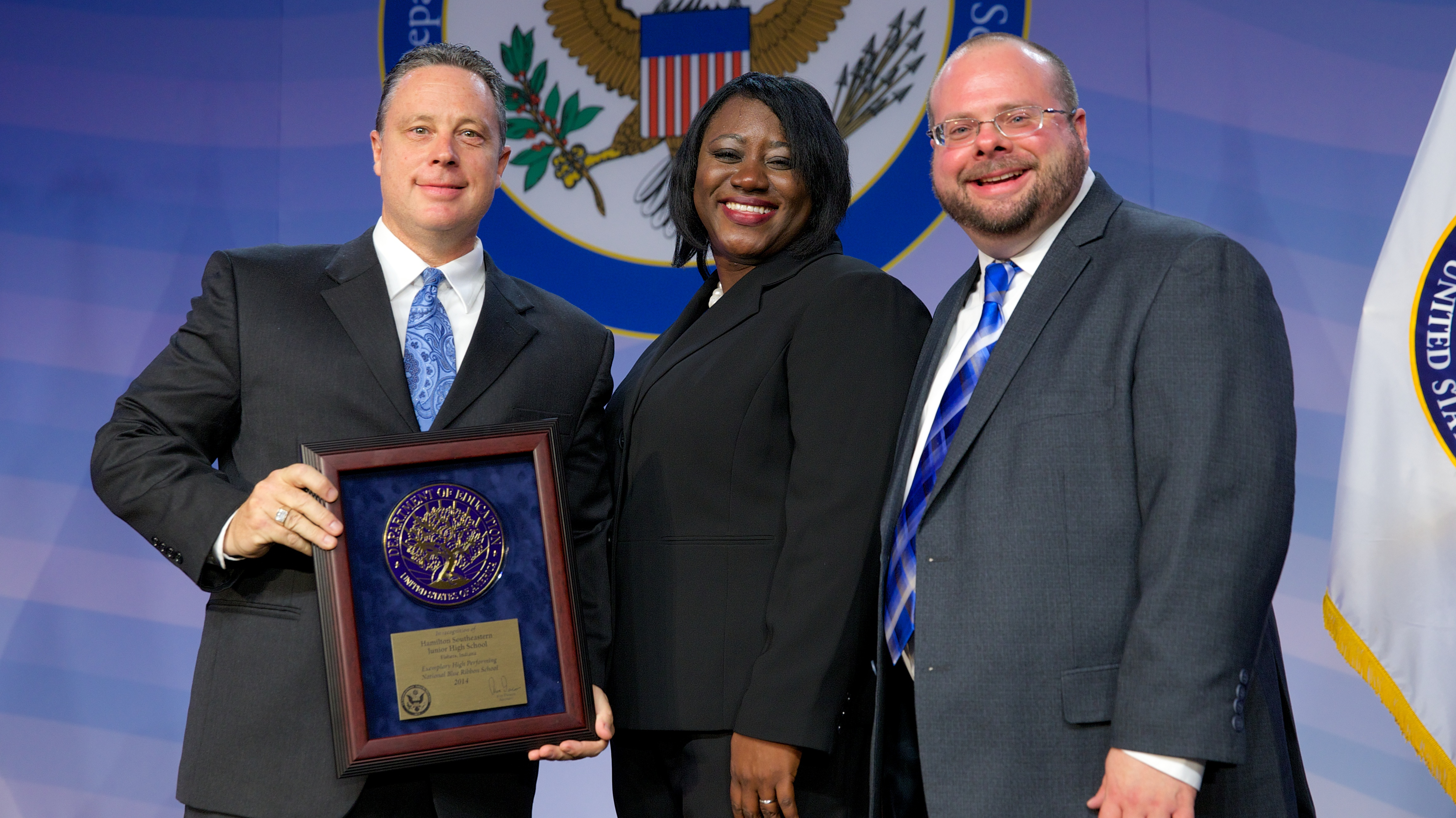
Hamilton Southeastern Junior High School is a 2014 National Blue Ribbon Schools Winner

- Fishers Junior High School – Chargers
- Hamilton Southeastern Junior High School – Panthers
- Riverside Junior High School – Golden Hawks
- Fall Creek Junior High School – Falcons

== Senior high (grades 9–12) ==
- Fishers High School – Tigers
- Hamilton Southeastern High School – Royals
