= Mekinges Conner =

Lenape woman (c.1780–c.1861)

- Born: After 1780; Near Anderson, Indiana
- Died: c. 1861
- Citizenship: Lenape
- Spouse: William Conner (married 1802)
- Children: 6
- Parent(s): Chief William Anderson and Ahkechelungunaqua

Mekinges Conner (after 1780 – c. 1861) was a Lenape woman.

Little is known about Mekinges Conner considering her role in the history of Hamilton County, Indiana. Many articles have been written about her husband William Conner, a pioneer on the banks of the White River who worked side by side with the Lenape, establishing a trading post and fur trade. Conner's marriage to Mekinges earned him a special status among—and perhaps the trust of—the Lenape, which would help to enable his business dealings as well as facilitate his role in the process of indigenous removal.

== Early life ==
Mekinges Conner was born after 1780 and grew up near the White River in what is now Anderson, Indiana. Her name is a variation on the Lenape word "macunchis" meaning "last born" (i.e., "the youngest"). She is believed to have been the daughter of the Lenape chief Kikthawenund, also known as Chief William Anderson, the head of the Turkey Clan of the Unami Lenape. Some sources dispute this claim, however; historian and writer C. A. Weslager introduces evidence that she was a member of the Ketchum family. Her mother was Ahkechelungunaqua, a woman from the Lenape Turtle Clan. Mekinges lived with her family until 1812, when she moved with her husband of ten years four miles (6.4 km) south of the town of Noblesville, Indiana, and east of the White River. The Lenape, also known as the Delaware (an English name derived from the first governor and captain-general of Virginia Lord De La Warr), had a matrilineal line (the children belonged to the mother's clan), and it was common that married children lived in the same household as their mother.

== Marriage ==
In 1802, Mekinges married a white fur trader named William Conner. Conner was actively involved in the settlement and development of central Indiana and also served as an interpreter for the Treaty of St. Mary's, signed in Ohio in 1818. Using his interpretive skills as well as his connections within the Lenape community to his advantage, Conner negotiated for the removal of the Lenape from Indiana. Specifically, the treaty stated that the Lenape would cede all claim to land in Indiana and relocate to a territory provided for them west of the Mississippi River. In exchange for their relocation, the United States government would grant travel funds and supplies as well as a perpetual annuity to the Lenape.

This removal included Mekinges and her children. It is unclear whether Conner intended for Mekinges to stay; in February 1820, he petitioned for a grant of land in Indiana "for the purpose of raising his family", yet later that same year, he remained in Indiana while Mekinges and their six children departed for Missouri under the protection of his business partner, William Marshall. Conner's petition for land was tabled in the House, so it is impossible to determine if his stated motive was genuine or if he made the appeal under false pretenses. When Mekinges left Indiana, Connor provided her with sixty horses and supposedly her share of the business.

Just a few months after Mekinges and her children left Indiana, William Conner married Elizabeth Chapman—a 17-year-old white woman from Noblesville—on November 30, 1820. She was the step-daughter of John Finch and the daughter of Finch's third wife Mehitable Brown Chapman.

== Family ==
Mekinges and William Conner had six children: John Conner (c. 1802 – c. 1872), James Conner (c. 1818 – 1877), Hamilton "Harry" Conner (c. 1805 – after 1863), Eliza Conner-Bullett (1812–1876), William Conner Jr., and Nancy Conner (1815–1834). They remained with her and the Lenape after she left Indiana. John and James became prominent Lenape chiefs.

Upon his death in 1855, William Conner left no last will and testament. His 6,000-acre (2,400 ha) estate went to his white children. In 1861, his Lenape descendents brought a suit against them, but the claim was "quieted" against the plaintiffs by Judge Laceb B. Smith at the U. S. Circuit Court for the District of Indiana on January 6, 1863, leaving Mekinges' children with no part of William Conner's estate.

== Later life ==
After leaving Indiana, Mekinges and her children first went to southern Missouri, traveling along the West Fork of the White River until reaching the Wabash River. They forded the Wabash and crossed southern Illinois, camping at Fort Kaskaskia. Due to poor weather conditions, Mekinges and her family had to remain at the fort until spring. At that time, most of the Lenape migrants made their way to Nixa (about four miles south of Springfield, Missouri), where they remained until 1830.

Mekinges and her family traveled alongside William Marshall and were with him when he established a trading post on the Jack Fork of the Current River. Although there is no evidence to support their presence in Arkansas, it is possible that Mekinges and her children also accompanied Marshall to the mouth of the Sulphur Fork of the Red River, where he opened a trading post. When the Lenape moved to the Delaware Reserve in present-day Kansas, Mekinges and her younger children also migrated there.

There is little information available about Mekinges' life on the Delaware Reserve, and the date of her death is subject to debate. It is believed that she died sometime around 1861, but there is some evidence that she may have lived beyond this date. The 1842 census of the Delaware Indians includes an entry for a "Muck-cun-chase" (No. 151), and there is a "Mu-cun-chus" in the census of 1862 (No. 473). The name "Nacumchis, dead" (No. 761) appears in "The Delaware Indians Residing in the Cherokee Nation, As a Tribe and Individuals Showing Their Lands, Improvements, Location and Valuation of Improvements in Possession of Them Prior to and on August 4, 1898", leading some researchers to believe that Mekinges was part of the group of Lenape who moved from Kansas into the Cherokee Nation. However, the variations in name spelling make it difficult to ascertain whether or not these entries are referring to the same person.

== Historical site ==
The cabin William Conner built for his first wife Mekinges and the Federal-style home he built for his second wife Elizabeth Chapman are located in the original site at the Conner Prairie Interactive History Park. The Federal-style house was added to the National Register of Historic Places in 1980.
