= Chief William Anderson =

18th-century chief of the Algonquian-speaking Lenape (Delaware)

- Kik-tha-we-nund
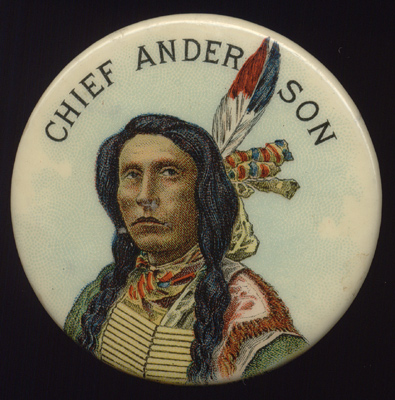
- Chief William Anderson

Lenape leader

Personal details
- Born: c. 1740 or 1750 (sources differ) Anderson's Ferry (present-day Marietta)
- Died: 1831

Kikthawenund (c. 1740 or 1750 – 1831), also known as William Anderson, was a leader of the Unalatchgo Lenape people. His Lenape name is said to mean "creaking boughs." The city of Anderson in Indiana is named after him.

== Early life ==
Kikthawenund was born along the banks of the Susquehanna River in or about what is today Marietta, Pennsylvania, close to what was then called Anderson's Ferry. The Ferry was operated by his father, John Anderson, a man of Swedish descent. John Anderson was married to a daughter of the Lenape chief Netawatwees. This woman's name has not been recorded. Since Lenape society is matrilineal, Kikthawenund was a member of the Unalachtgo (or Turkey) clan by virtue of his mother's affiliation.

Little is recorded of Kikthawenund's early life. Kikthawenund was less than 20 years old when he first married. His first wife's name has not been recorded, but she had at least two sons at the time of their marriage, named Swannuck and Pushies. She died several years after her marriage to Kikthawenund, and in 1784, he was married again, this time to a woman named Ahkechlungunaqua. She already had at least two sons at the time they married—Lapahnihe and Tahleockwe—and a daughter, Aukeelenqua. Some sources say she also had a third son, named Secondyan.

Aukeelenqua and Kikthawenund had three children together: two sons, Sarcoxie and Sosecum, and a daughter, Mekinges (though there is some evidence to suggest that Mekinges was actually a member of the Ketchum family).

By the 1790s, Kikthawenund had moved to what is now Ohio and was one of 14 Lenape leaders to sign the Treaty of Greenville. This treaty established the cession of certain tracts of land by the local indigenous peoples, and because of this, Kikthawenund was forced to relocate to what is now the city of Anderson, Indiana. The move seems not to have happened until 1798 based on later statements of his son Sarcoxie. Kikthawenund built a two-level, double-sided log house within the current boundaries of the city of Anderson. His second wife died in 1805, and he never remarried.

== Lenape Chief ==
In 1806 an assembly was held in Kikthawenund's village, during which he was elevated to chief of the Lenape. This elevation came upon the death of the previous chief, Tetepachsit, in March of that year. According to Kikthawenund's descendants, he did not want this new position, but he accepted it nonetheless.

In 1811, Kikthawenund refused to aid the Shawnee chief Tecumseh and his brother Tenskwatawa (also known as "The Prophet") in reclaiming ceded territory in Ohio and Indiana. Tecumseh and Tenskwatawa's confederation was defeated at the Battle of Tippecanoe on November 7, 1811, near Lafayette, Indiana. Later that year Kikthawenund and his followers relocated to Piqua, Ohio at the urging of William Henry Harrison. In 1815, Kikthawenund returned to his village in Indiana, which had been burned by the U.S. Army while he was away, and began to rebuild it.

Kikthawenund was a signatory of one of the 1818 Treaties of St. Mary's in Ohio in which the Lenape agreed to leave Indiana and relocate west of the Mississippi. In 1821 Kikthawenund, along with nearly 1,350 other Lenape, relocated from Indiana to the banks of the Current River in southwest Missouri. In the fall of 1830 Kikthawenund and his followers moved to what is now Kansas, where he died in October of the following year. It is believed that he is buried near present-day Bonner Springs in Wyandotte County, Kansas.
