= National Register of Historic Places listings in Hamilton County, Indiana =

Location of Hamilton County in Indiana

This is a list of the National Register of Historic Places listings in Hamilton County, Indiana.

This is intended to be a complete list of the properties and districts on the National Register of Historic Places in Hamilton County, Indiana, United States. Latitude and longitude coordinates are provided for many National Register properties and districts; these locations may be seen together in a map.

There are 34 properties and districts listed on the National Register in the county, and two former listings.

Properties and districts located in incorporated areas display the name of the municipality, while properties and districts in unincorporated areas display the name of their civil township. Properties and districts split between multiple jurisdictions display the names of all jurisdictions.

This National Park Service list is complete through NPS recent listings posted October 30, 2026.

== Current listings ==
	Name on the Register	Image	Date listed	Location	City or town	Description
1	Applegate-Johnson Farmstead	Applegate-Johnson Farmstead	August 28, 2024 (#100010740)	9680 Haverstick Road; 39°55′45″N 86°07′02″W	Carmel	
2	Archeological Site 12H1052		March 17, 2015 (#15000077)	Address Restricted	White River Township	
3	George Boxley Cabin	George Boxley Cabin	September 15, 2005 (#05001010)	Pioneer Hill 103 W 1st St. Sheridan; 40°08′20″N 86°13′15″W	Sheridan	
4	Castor Farm Site	Castor Farm Site	December 8, 2008 (#08001207)	River bottoms below the Strawtown Enclosure, northeast of Noblesville; 40°07′44″N 85°57′09″W	White River Township	
5	Catherine Street Historic District	Catherine Street Historic District	September 16, 2001 (#01000988)	Roughly bounded by Harrison, Clinton, the western side of 9th, and the eastern side of 10th 40°02′54″N 86°00′46″W	Noblesville	
6	Cole-Evans House	Cole-Evans House	September 22, 2000 (#00001136)	1012 Monument St. 40°03′04″N 86°00′43″W	Noblesville	
7	Conner Street Historic District	Conner Street Historic District	March 12, 1999 (#99000296)	Roughly both sides of Logan and Conner Sts. between 10th and 17th 40°02′46″N 86°00′29″W	Noblesville	
8	William Conner House	William Conner House	February 8, 1980 (#80000038)	13400 Allisonville Rd. 39°59′04″N 86°01′53″W	Fishers	
9	William Houston Craig House	William Houston Craig House	May 24, 1990 (#90000808)	1250 E. Conner St. 40°02′45″N 86°00′34″W	Noblesville	
10	Daniel Craycraft House	Daniel Craycraft House	January 4, 1989 (#88003040)	1095 E. Conner St. 40°02′43″N 86°00′39″W	Noblesville	
11	Davenport-Bradfield House	Davenport-Bradfield House	January 18, 1985 (#85000089)	106 E. 2nd St. 40°08′13″N 86°13′11″W	Sheridan	
12	Hamilton County Courthouse Square	Hamilton County Courthouse Square	May 10, 1978 (#78000033)	Bounded by Logan, 8th, 9th, and Conner Sts. 40°02′45″N 86°00′51″W	Noblesville	
13	Dr. Samuel Harrell House	Dr. Samuel Harrell House	March 1, 1984 (#84001040)	399 N. 10th St. 40°02′56″N 86°00′44″W	Noblesville	
14	Holliday Hydroelectric Powerhouse and Dam	Holliday Hydroelectric Powerhouse and Dam	June 9, 1995 (#95000706)	Riverwood Ave. at its junction with 211th St., across the White River northeast of Noblesville; 40°05′42″N 85°58′08″W	Noblesville Township	
15	John Kinzer House	John Kinzer House	September 5, 1975 (#75000020)	East of downtown Carmel on State Road 234; 39°58′44″N 86°06′32″W	Carmel	
16	Micah Newby House	Micah Newby House	June 20, 1986 (#86001349)	1149 W. 116th St., west of Carmel; 39°57′19″N 86°10′37″W	Clay Township	
17	Noblesville Commercial Historic District	Noblesville Commercial Historic District	December 19, 1991 (#91001862)	Roughly bounded by Clinton, 10th, Maple, and 8th Sts. 40°02′44″N 86°00′49″W	Noblesville	
18	Noblesville Milling Company Mill	Noblesville Milling Company Mill	December 7, 2001 (#01001346)	S. 8th St. 40°02′30″N 86°00′55″W	Noblesville	
19	Plum Prairie Residential Historic District		March 13, 2019 (#100003502)	Roughly bounded by Vine, Walnut, 7th, South, & 5th Sts. including blk. W. to 4th between Walnut & Pleasant Sts. 40°02′25″N 86°00′58″W	Noblesville Township	
20	Potter's Covered Bridge	Potter's Covered Bridge	December 19, 1991 (#91001866)	Allisonville Rd. across the White River, north of Noblesville; 40°04′21″N 86°00′02″W	Noblesville Township	
21	Roads Hotel	Roads Hotel	December 30, 1987 (#87002187)	150 E. Main St. 40°12′57″N 86°01′31″W	Atlanta	
22	Roberts Chapel	Roberts Chapel	September 25, 1996 (#96001009)	3102 E. 276th St., southwest of Atlanta; 40°11′26″N 86°06′50″W	Jackson Township	
23	Sheridan Downtown Commercial Historic District	Sheridan Downtown Commercial Historic District	September 20, 2007 (#07000979)	Roughly includes Main St. from E. 2nd to the old Monon Railroad right-of-way 40°08′14″N 86°13′14″W	Sheridan	
24	South 9th Street Historic District	South 9th Street Historic District	September 16, 2001 (#01000982)	Roughly bounded by Maple, Division, 10th, and the western side of 9th St. 40°02′35″N 86°00′48″W	Noblesville	
25	Judge Earl S. Stone House	Judge Earl S. Stone House	December 8, 1978 (#78000034)	107 S. 8th St. 40°02′40″N 86°00′54″W	Noblesville	
26	Strawtown Enclosure	Strawtown Enclosure	March 19, 2008 (#08000192)	Northern side of Strawtown Ave., west of Strawtown; 40°07′35″N 85°57′06″W	White River Township	
27	Stultz-Stanley House	Stultz-Stanley House	February 15, 2022 (#100007442)	209 West Main St. 40°02′33″N 86°07′49″W	Westfield	
28	Taylor Ten		December 24, 2009 (#09001130)	Address Restricted	White River Township	
29	Thornhurst Addition	Thornhurst Addition	June 24, 2010 (#10000378)	Bounded by 650 to 742 West Main St., Thornhurst Dr. and Rogers Ct. 39°58′44″N 86°08′16″W	Carmel	
30	Union High Academy Historic District	Union High Academy Historic District	March 3, 1995 (#95000209)	434 S. Union St. 40°02′19″N 86°07′34″W	Westfield	
31	Micajah Walden House		May 31, 2019 (#100004042)	3909 E. 276th St. 40°11′25″N 86°05′42″W	Atlanta vicinity	
32	West-Harris House	West-Harris House	March 23, 1999 (#99000297)	10595 Eller Rd. 39°56′28″N 86°03′57″W	Fishers	
33	Westfield Historic District	Westfield Historic District	January 31, 2019 (#100003180)	Roughly bounded by Camilla Ct. and Penn, Walnut, and Park Sts. 40°02′34″N 86°07′40″W	Westfield	
34	Robert L. Wilson House	Robert L. Wilson House	September 17, 2008 (#08000918)	273 S. 8th St. 40°02′35″N 86°00′56″W	Noblesville	

== Former listings ==
	Name on the Register	Image	Date listed	Date removed	Location	City or town	Description
1	Carmel Monon Depot	Carmel Monon Depot	June 25, 2013 (#13000420)	May 22, 2023	211 1st St., SW. 39°58′38″N 86°07′48″W	Carmel	
2	Nickel Plate Road Steam Locomotive No. 587	Nickel Plate Road Steam Locomotive No. 587	November 28, 1984 (#84000313)	November 15, 2021	Indiana Transportation Museum; 40°03′30″N 86°01′15″W	Noblesville	

== See also ==
- List of National Historic Landmarks in Indiana
- National Register of Historic Places listings in Indiana
- Listings in neighboring counties: Boone, Clinton, Hancock, Madison, Marion, Tipton
- List of Indiana state historical markers in Hamilton County
