= List of Indiana state historical markers in Hamilton County =

Location of Hamilton County in Indiana

This is a list of the Indiana state historical markers in Hamilton County.

This is intended to be a complete list of the official state historical markers placed in Hamilton County, Indiana, United States by the Indiana Historical Bureau. The locations of the historical markers and their latitude and longitude coordinates are included below when available, along with their names, years of placement, and topics as recorded by the Historical Bureau. There are 9 historical markers located in Hamilton County.

== Historical markers ==
Marker title	Image	Year placed	Location	Topics
The Central Canal		1994	Junction of State Road 37 and 191st Street in Noblesville; 40°4′0.5″N 85°59′12.1″W	Transportation, Business, Industry, and Labor
Conner Street Historic District		2005	Conner Street and 17th Street in Noblesville; 40°2′44.4″N 86°0′15.2″W	Historic District, Neighborhoods, and Towns, Buildings and Architecture, Business, Industry, and Labor, Transportation
Conner Street Historic District		2005	1039 Logan Street in Noblesville; 40°2′47.4″N 86°0′42.8″W	Historic District, Neighborhoods, and Towns, Buildings and Architecture, Business, Industry, and Labor, Transportation
Potter's Covered Bridge		2007	19401 N. Allisonville Road in Noblesville; 40°4′21″N 86°0′1.6″W	Buildings and Architecture, Transportation
Rhodes Family Incident		2008	Asa Bales Park at the junction of U.S. Route 31 and Hoover Street in Westfield; 40°3′0″N 86°7′48″W	[none]
Roberts Settlement		2016	3102 East 276th Street, Atlanta; 40°11′25″N 86°6′49″W	
Ryan White (1971–1990)		2019	Hamilton Heights Student Activity Center, 420 West North St., Arcadia; 40°10′36″N 86°01′35″W	Science, Medicine, and Invention; Education and Library
Norman Norell, 1900-1972 - Dean of American Fashion		2021	Along 8th St. between Cherry St. and Maple Ave., Noblesville; 40°02′29″N 86°00′52″W	Arts and Culture; Business, Industry, & Labor
Grave Robbing Scandal		2022	Southeast of the Fishers Fire Department, Station #92, near 11595 Brooks School Rd, Fishers; 39°57′24″N 85°56′33″W	Science, Medicine, & Invention

== See also ==
- List of Indiana state historical markers
- National Register of Historic Places listings in Hamilton County, Indiana
