= Clare, Indiana =

- Unincorporated community
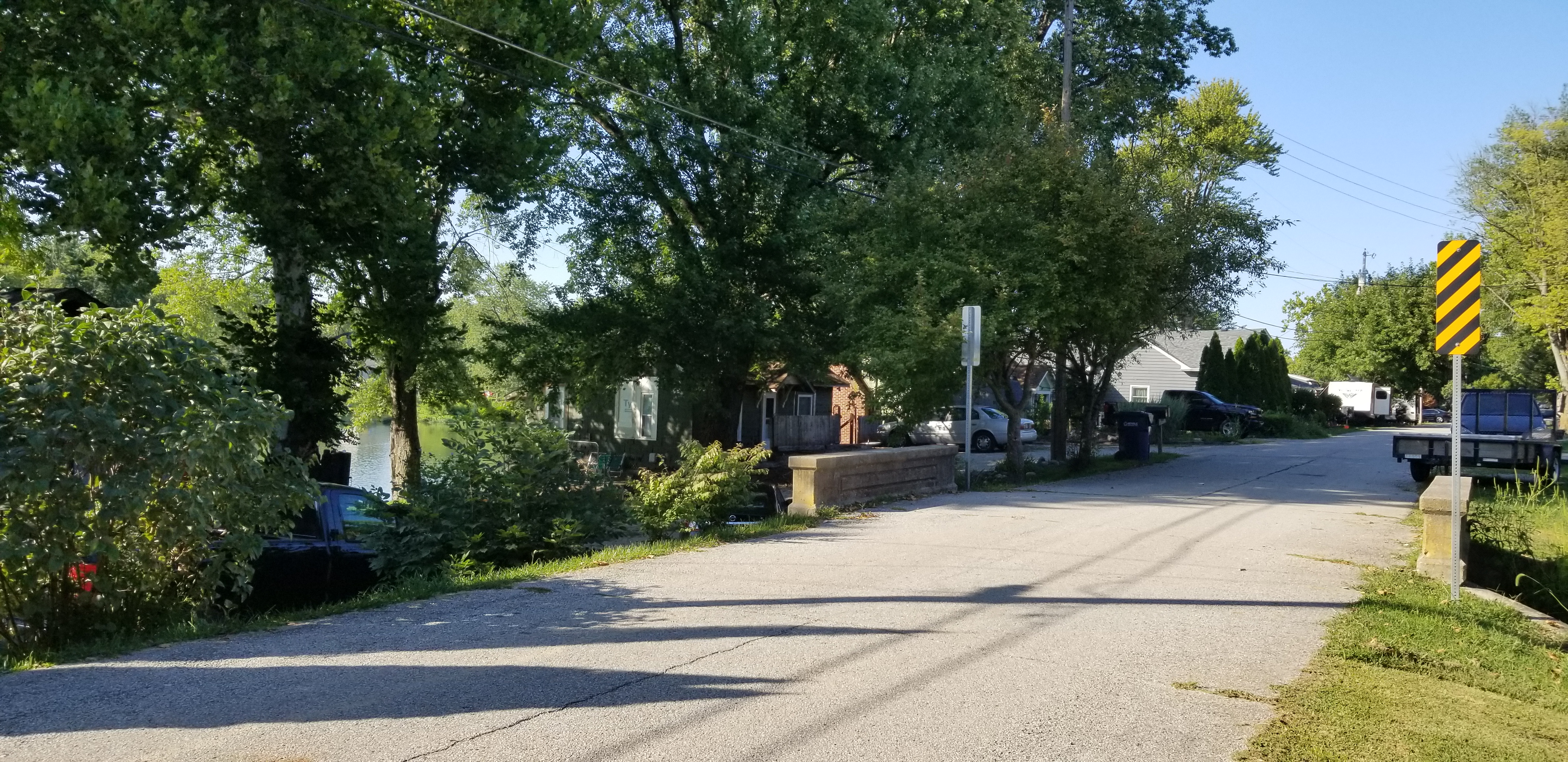

- Location within Indiana Location within the United States
- Coordinates: 40°05′55″N 85°57′55″W
- Country: United States
- State: Indiana
- County: Hamilton
- Township: Noblesville
- Established: 1830
- Elevation: 791 ft (241 m)

Population
  - Total: 50
- ZIP code: 46060
- FIPS code: 18-12754
- GNIS feature ID: 447639

Clare is a small unincorporated community in White River Township, Hamilton County, Indiana.

== History ==
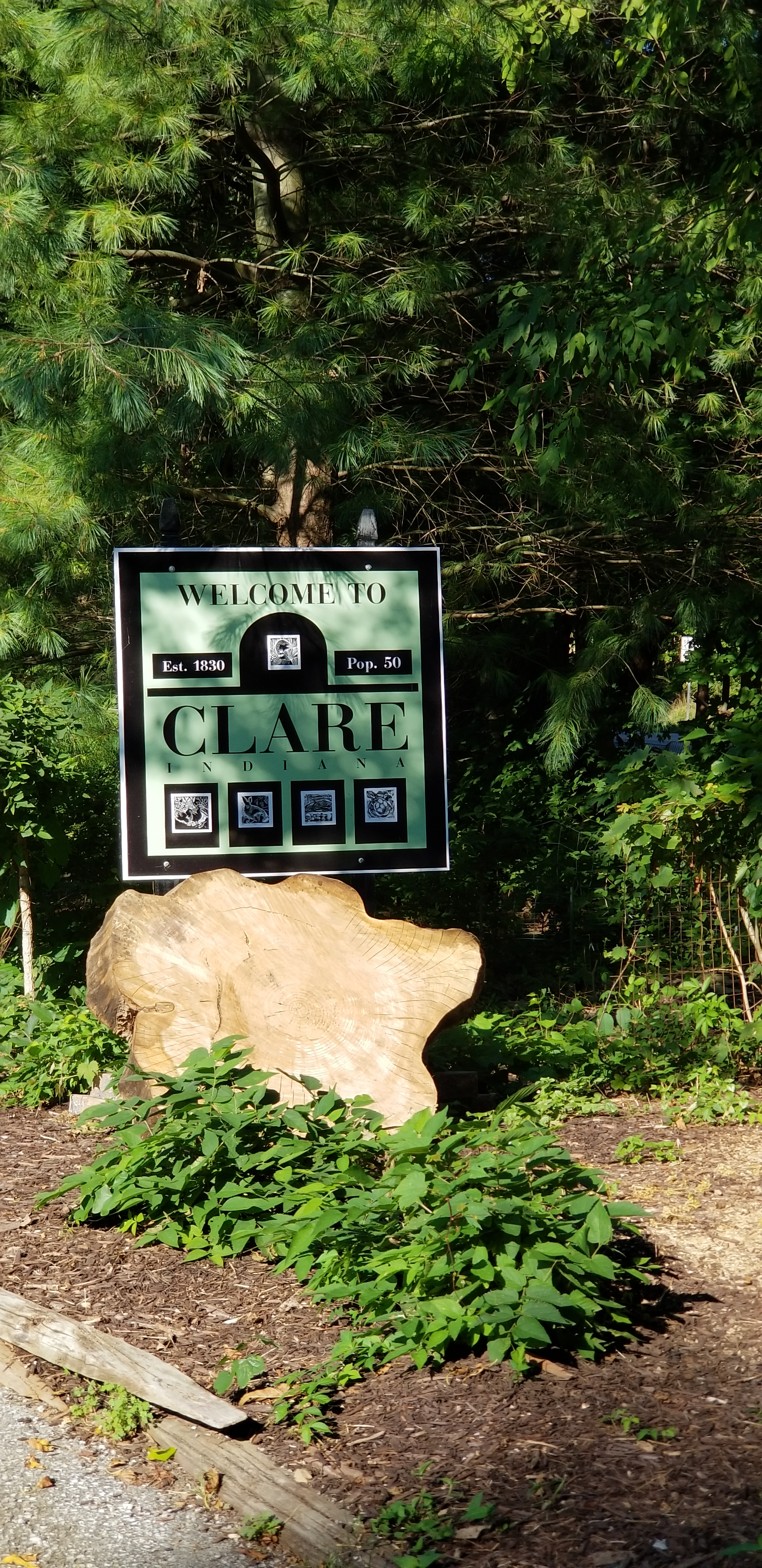
Sign welcoming visitors to Clare Indiana

The first settlement at Clare was made in about 1830. A post office was established at Clare in 1878, and remained in operation until it was discontinued in 1902.

== Geography ==
Clare is located on the eastern bank of the White River directly across from the town of Riverwood. Clare Avenue, the town's single street, runs immediately parallel to State Road 37. The town is generally considered to stretch from 211th Street to 216th Street, in the narrow strip of land between State Road 37 and the White River.

== Holliday Dam ==
The Holliday Hydroelectric Powerhouse and Dam was built in 1922 just south of Clare. Riverwood, on the west bank of the White River, was established partially because of the building of this dam. It is sometimes referred to as the Clare Dam or the Riverwood Dam.
