= Wayne Township, Hamilton County, Indiana =

Wayne Township
- Township
- Location in Hamilton County
- Coordinates: 40°03′23″N 85°54′30″W
- Country: United States
- State: Indiana
- County: Hamilton
- Organized: 1833

Government
  - Type: Indiana township
  - Trustee: Laura McNamara

Area
  - Total: 35.13 sq mi (91.0 km^{2})
  - Land: 35.09 sq mi (90.9 km^{2})
  - Water: 0.04 sq mi (0.10 km^{2}) 0.11%
- Elevation: 823 ft (251 m)

Population (2020)
  - Total: 10,935
  - Density: 224.8/sq mi (86.8/km^{2})
- Time zone: UTC-5 (EST)
  - Summer (DST): UTC-4 (EDT)
- ZIP code: 46060
- Area code(s): 317, 463, 765
- FIPS code: 18-81710
- GNIS feature ID: 0454030

Wayne Township is one of nine townships in Hamilton County, Indiana, United States and serves as one of two townships within Noblesville, Indiana's jurisdiction. As of the 2020 census, its population was 10,935. In 2007, Noblesville officially opened one of the largest mixed use developments in the state, called the Noblesville Corporate Campus. A portion of the development is located within the township. When completed, it will include a large industrial/commercial park, several housing developments, hotels, greenspace and a large outdoor shopping center called Hamilton Town Center, being built by the Simon Property Group, headquartered in nearby Indianapolis.

Hamilton Southeastern Schools serve Wayne Township.

Wayne Township is served by Wayne Township Volunteer Fire Department. An active volunteer fire department running over 350 calls per year, the department provides Advanced Life Support medical service, fire protection, and rescue services to residents. The department operates out of Station 15 on Durbin Road, with Engine 315, Tanker 315, Ambulance 315, Squad 315, Grass 315, and Rescue 315. Consisting of 25 members the department has two firefighters on shift daily (Monday through Friday) and two volunteer firefighters on shift overnight and on weekends.

== History ==
Wayne Township was organized in 1833.

== Geography ==
According to the 2010 census, the township has a total area of 35.13 square miles (91.0 km^{2}), of which 35.09 square miles (90.9 km^{2}) (or 99.89%) is land and 0.04 square miles (0.10 km^{2}) (or 0.11%) is water. The streams of Gwinn Ditch, Lock Ditch, Mud Creek, Sand Creek, Stony Creek, and William Lehr Ditch run through this township.

=== Cities and towns ===
- Noblesville (east edge)

=== Unincorporated communities ===
- Clarksville
- Durbin

=== Adjacent townships ===
- White River Township (north)
- Jackson Township, Madison County (northeast)
- Stony Creek Township, Madison County (east)
- Green Township, Madison County (southeast)
- Fall Creek Township (south)
- Noblesville Township (west)

=== Cemeteries ===
The township contains five cemeteries: Bethel, Ervin, Prairie Baptist, Stern and Stony Creek.

=== Major highways ===
- Indiana State Road 13
- Indiana State Road 32
- Indiana State Road 38
- Indiana State Road 238

== Education ==
Secondary students in Wayne Township attend Hamilton Southeastern High School in nearby Fishers. Wayne Township residents may obtain a free library card from the Hamilton East Public Library in Noblesville.
