= Riverwood =

Riverwood may refer to:

== Places ==
Australia

- Riverwood, New South Wales, a suburb of Sydney, Australia
  - Riverwood railway station

United States

- Riverwood, Indiana
- Riverwood, Kentucky
- Riverwood, Oregon
- Riverwoods, Illinois
- Riverwood (Nashville, Tennessee), a house listed on the National Register of Historic Places

== Schools ==
- Riverwood High School, Sandy Springs, Georgia, United States

== Other ==
- Riverwood (Skyrim village), a village in the Whiterun Hold in The Elder Scrolls V: Skyrim
