= Clarksville, Hamilton County, Indiana =

- Unincorporated community
- Location within Indiana Location within the United States
- Coordinates: 40°1′56″N 85°54′45″W
- Country: United States
- State: Indiana
- County: Hamilton
- Township: Wayne
- Established: 1849
- Elevation: 456 ft (139 m)
- ZIP code: 46060
- FIPS code: 18-12952
- GNIS feature ID: 432577

Clarksville is an unincorporated community in Wayne Township, Hamilton County, Indiana. It was likely named in honor of George Rogers Clark, an officer in the American Revolutionary War.

== History ==
Clarksville was originally called Nicholsonville, and under the latter name was laid out in 1849 by Abraham Nicholson. Clarksville was incorporated as a town in 1867, however its incorporation was later dissolved.

A post office was established as Nicholsonville in 1850, was renamed Clarksville that same year, and closed in 1902.
