= Cole-Evans House =

Historic house in Indiana, United States

- Cole--Evans House
- U.S. National Register of Historic Places
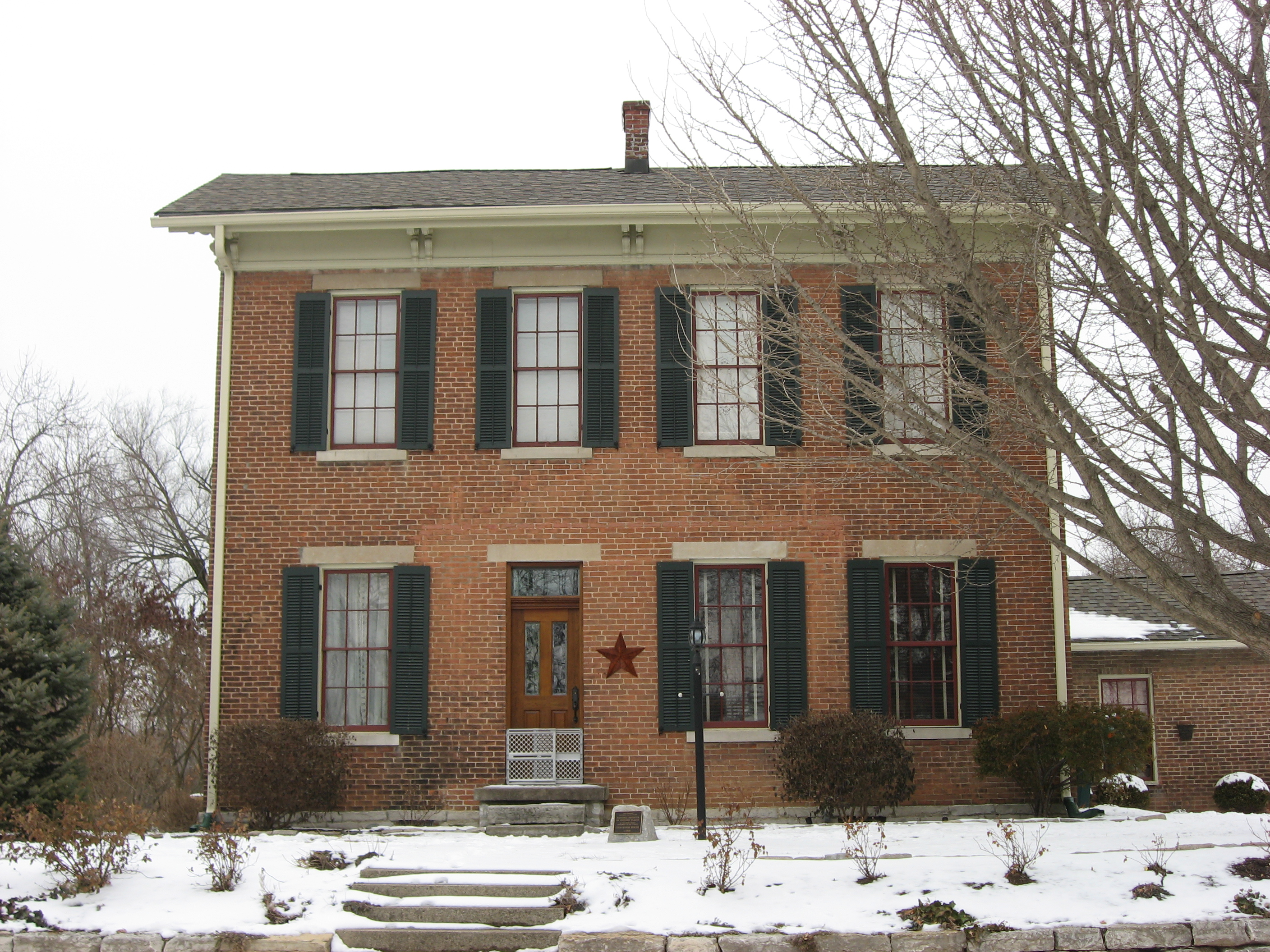
- The house in 2011

- Location within Indiana Location within the United States
- Location: 1012 Monument Street, Noblesville, Indiana
- Coordinates: 40°03′04″N 86°00′43″W
- Area: less than one acre
- Built: 1840
- Architectural style: Federal, Italianate, et.al.
- NRHP reference No.: 00001136
- Added to NRHP: September 22, 2000

The Cole-Evans House is a historic house in Noblesville, Indiana. It was built circa 1840 for Bicknel Cole, a businessman who served in the Indiana Senate from 1836 to 1840. It was subsequently purchased by Jonathan Evans, a businessman who expanded the house in 1856. In the twentieth century, the house once again expanded in 1930, 1980, and 1993. It was designed in the Federal and Italianate architectural styles. It has been listed on the National Register of Historic Places since September 22, 2000.
