= Delaware Township, Hamilton County, Indiana =

Delaware Township
- Township
- Motto: "United we Serve"
- Location in Hamilton County
- Coordinates: 39°57′25″N 86°01′37″W
- Country: United States
- State: Indiana
- County: Hamilton
- Organized: 1823

Government
  - Type: Indiana township
  - Trustee: Debbie Driskell

Area
  - Total: 15.66 sq mi (40.57 km^{2})
  - Land: 15.22 sq mi (39.43 km^{2})
  - Water: 0.44 sq mi (1.14 km^{2})
- Elevation: 817 ft (249 m)

Population (2020)
  - Total: 34,723
  - Density: 2,281/sq mi (880.6/km^{2})
- Time zone: UTC-5 (EST)
  - Summer (DST): UTC-4 (EDT)
- ZIP codes: 46037-38 (Fishers); 46060 (Noblesville); 46250, 46256 (Indianapolis)
- Area code(s): 317, 463
- FIPS code: 18-17488
- GNIS feature ID: 453261
- Website: Official website

Delaware Township is one of nine townships in Hamilton County, Indiana, United States. As of the 2020 census, its population was 34,723.

== History ==
Delaware Township was organized in 1823.

In the late 1940s, community members began to support changing western Delaware Township borders and becoming part of Clay Township. Carmel had originally been founded as Bethlehem on the border between Delaware and Clay Townships, along the range line. This caused administrative and government issues almost from the beginning. Other township consolidation efforts had been attempted in previous decades, with no success. Because there were few places to cross the river, school access from one side of the river to the other was frustrating and the early 1950s saw an increase in overcrowding in Carmel schools.

In 1955, after petitions and votes by township residents, the county commissioners acted to change the boundaries of Delaware and Clay Townships - with the dividing line being the White River. This made Delaware Township the smallest by land area in the county and Clay Township the largest. To accomplish this, an emergency measure had to be passed in the state legislature that allowed a township to be a minimum of 12 square miles.

== Geography ==
According to the 2020 census, the township has a total area of 15.664 square miles (40.57 km^{2}), of which 15.225 square miles (39.43 km^{2}) is land and 0.439 square miles (1.14 km^{2}) is water. The streams of Weaver Creek, Home Run, Britton Branch, Shoemaker Ditch, Smock Creek, Light Branch, Delight Creek, Cheeney Creek, Hare Creek, Eller Run, Heath Ditch, and Behner Brook run through this township.

=== Cities and towns ===
- Noblesville (south edge of Noblesville)
- Fishers (west half of Fishers)

=== Adjacent townships ===
- Noblesville Township (north)
- Fall Creek Township (east)
- Lawrence Township, Marion County (south)
- Washington Township, Marion County (southwest)
- Clay Township (west)

=== Cemeteries ===
The township contains four cemeteries: Eller, Heady Lane, Oaklawn Memorial Gardens, and Spannuth.

=== Major highways ===
- Interstate 69
- State Road 37

=== Airports and landing strips ===
- Beaver Airstrip
- Indianapolis Metropolitan Airfield

== Education ==
Hamilton Southeastern School District services Delaware Township. The majority of high school students in this township attend Fishers High School, with a small portion attending Hamilton Southeastern High School.

Delaware Township residents may obtain a free library card from the Hamilton East Public Library, with branches in Noblesville and Fishers.

== See also ==
- List of Indiana townships
