= Home Place, Indiana =

- Neighborhood
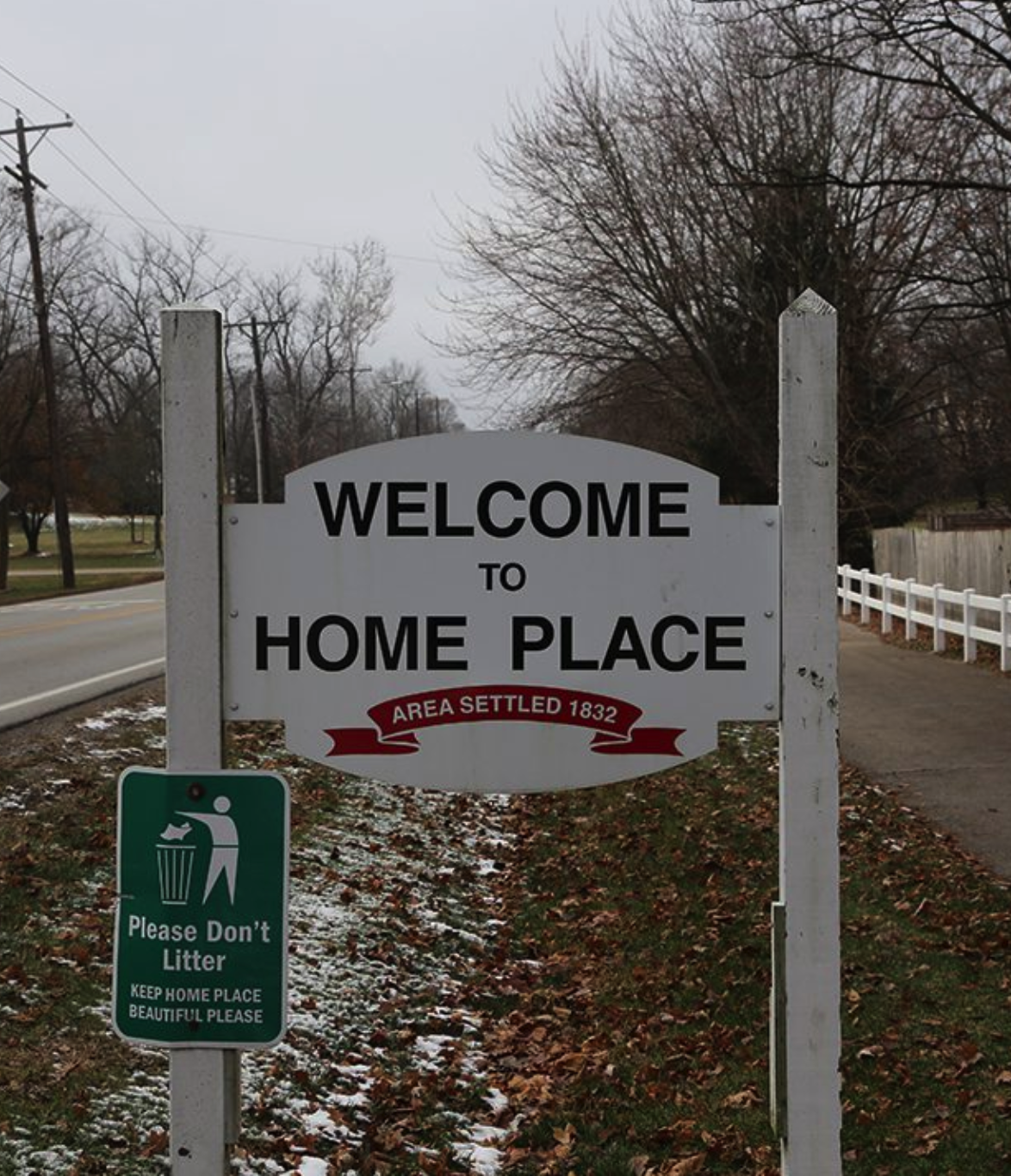

- Map of Hamilton County showing Home Place within the city limits of Carmel
- Coordinates: 39°56′38″N 86°08′36″W
- Country: United States
- State: Indiana
- County: Hamilton
- Settled: 1832
- Town plotted: 1914
- Annexed by Carmel: March 1, 2018

Area
  - Total: 1.59 sq mi (4.1 km^{2})
  - Land: 1.57 sq mi (4.1 km^{2})
  - Water: 0.02 sq mi (0.052 km^{2}) 1.26%
- Elevation: 846 ft (258 m)
- Time zone: UTC-5 (EST)
  - Summer (DST): UTC-5 (EST)
- ZIP codes: 46280
- Area codes: 317, 463
- GNIS feature ID: 436367
- Website: Home Place, Indiana website

Home Place is a neighborhood within the city of Carmel, Indiana, in the United States. It was previously an unincorporated community of 1,017 acres (412 ha) in Clay Township, Hamilton County, Indiana, that had resisted annexation attempts by Carmel since 2004. However, in June 2016, a special judge ruled that residents of Home Place had failed to meet all the requirements to prevent the annexation, and that Carmel could move forward with the annexation. After that decision was upheld by the Indiana Court of Appeals in October 2017, representatives of the Home Place residents reached an agreement with city leaders. On March 1, 2018, Carmel completed the annexation of the Home Place community.

== History ==
Home Place was laid out in 1914 along the Union Traction interurban line between Indianapolis and points north. Although officially annexed by Carmel in 2018, the neighborhood retained its historical Indianapolis postal code. Mail is delivered by the Nora, Indianapolis post office, in neighboring Marion County, Indiana.
