= Riverwood, Indiana =

- Unincorporated community and Census-designated place
- Location within Indiana Location within the United States
- Coordinates: 40°06′03″N 85°58′03″W
- Country: United States
- State: Indiana
- County: Hamilton
- Township: Noblesville
- Elevation: 774 ft (236 m)
- ZIP code: 46060
- FIPS code: 18-64944
- GNIS feature ID: 2830396

Riverwood is an unincorporated community in Noblesville Township, Hamilton County, Indiana. It was likely named from the nearby White River.

== Demographics ==
The United States Census Bureau defined Riverwood as a census designated place in the 2022 American Community Survey.

== Recreation ==
Hamilton County Parks and Recreation built the Riverwood Canoe Landing in 2007 as part of their long-range plan to develop Bur Oak Bend. This property is just south of the community of Riverwood.

== Holliday Dam ==
The Holliday Hydroelectric Powerhouse and Dam was built in 1922 just south of Clare. Riverwood, on the west bank of the White River, was established partially because of the building of this dam. It is sometimes referred to as the Clare Dam or the Riverwood Dam.
