= Fall Creek Township, Hamilton County, Indiana =

Fall Creek Township
- Township
- Logo

- Location in Hamilton County
- Coordinates: 39°57′36″N 85°55′49″W
- Country: United States
- State: Indiana
- County: Hamilton
- Organized: 1833

Government
  - Type: Indiana township
  - Trustee: Doug Allman

Area
  - Total: 35.77 sq mi (92.6 km^{2})
  - Land: 33.67 sq mi (87.2 km^{2})
  - Water: 2.09 sq mi (5.4 km^{2}) 5.84%
- Elevation: 830 ft (253 m)

Population (2020)
  - Total: 70,892
  - Density: 1,532.8/sq mi (591.8/km^{2})
- Time zone: UTC-5 (EST)
  - Summer (DST): UTC-4 (EDT)
- ZIP codes: 46037-38 (Fishers); 46040 (Fortville); 46055 (McCordsville); 46060 (Noblesville); 46256 (Indianapolis)
- Area code(s): 317, 463
- FIPS code: 18-22612
- GNIS feature ID: 453290
- Website: fallcreektwp.com

Fall Creek Township is one of nine townships in Hamilton County, Indiana, United States. As of the 2020 census, its population was 70,892.

== History ==
Fall Creek Township was organized in 1833.

== Geography ==
According to the 2010 census, the township has a total area of 35.77 square miles (92.6 km^{2}), of which 33.67 square miles (87.2 km^{2}) (or 94.13%) is land and 2.09 square miles (5.4 km^{2}) (or 5.84%) is water. The streams of Bee Camp Creek, Bills Branch, Britton Branch, Flatfork Creek, High Ditch, Lowery Creek, Mount Zion Branch, Mud Creek, Sand Creek, Thorpe Creek, Thor Run, and William Lehr Ditch run through this township.

=== Cities and towns ===
- Noblesville (southeast and far east edges of Noblesville)
- Fishers (east half of Fishers)

=== Adjacent townships ===
- Wayne Township (north)
- Green Township, Madison County (east)
- Vernon Township, Hancock County (southeast)
- Lawrence Township, Marion County (southwest)
- Delaware Township (west)
- Noblesville Township (northwest)

=== Cemeteries ===
The township contains eight cemeteries: Arnett, Bethlehem, Brooks, Helm, Highland, Lowery, McKay and Mount Zion.

=== Major highways ===
- Interstate 69
- State Road 238

== Education ==
Hamilton Southeastern School District services Fall Creek Township. Students in the geographic majority of this township attend Hamilton Southeastern High School, with a smaller portion attending Fishers High School.

Fall Creek Township residents may obtain a free library card from the Hamilton East Public Library, with branches in Fishers and Noblesville.
