= Noblesville Township, Hamilton County, Indiana =

Noblesville Township
- Township
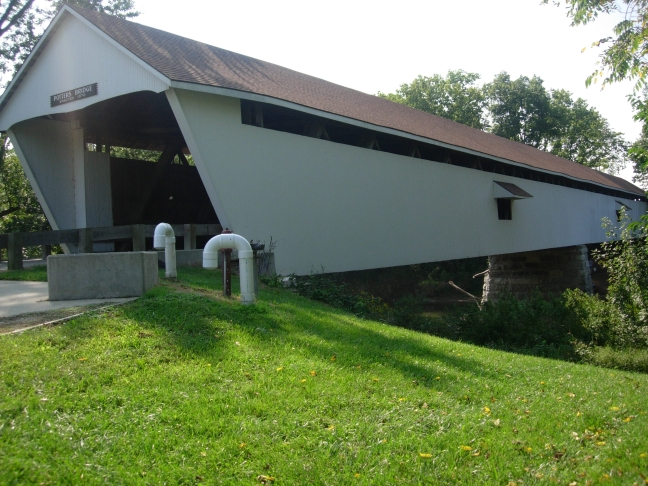
- Potter's Covered Bridge

- Seal
- Motto: "Giving Hope to Those in Need"
- Location in Hamilton County
- Coordinates: 40°03′09″N 86°01′30″W
- Country: United States
- State: Indiana
- County: Hamilton
- Organized: 1827

Government
  - Type: Indiana township
  - Trustee: Theresa Caldwell

Area
  - Total: 49.11 sq mi (127.19 km^{2})
  - Land: 46.83 sq mi (121.28 km^{2})
  - Water: 2.28 sq mi (5.91 km^{2})
- Elevation: 791 ft (241 m)

Population (2020)
  - Total: 64,067
  - Density: 1,368.2/sq mi (528.26/km^{2})
- Time zone: UTC-5 (EST)
  - Summer (DST): UTC-4 (EDT)
- ZIP codes: 46034 (Cicero); 46060, 46062 (Noblesville)
- Area code(s): 317, 463
- FIPS code: 18-54198
- GNIS feature ID: 0453676
- Website: noblesvilletownshiptrustee.com

Noblesville Township is one of nine townships in Hamilton County, Indiana, United States. As of the 2020 census, its population was 64,067.

== History ==
Noblesville Township was organized in 1827.

The Holliday Hydroelectric Powerhouse and Dam and Potter's Covered Bridge are listed on the National Register of Historic Places.

== Geography ==
According to the 2020 census, the township has a total area of 49.108 square miles (127.19 km^{2}), of which 46.825 square miles (121.28 km^{2}) is land and 2.283 square miles (5.91 km^{2}) is water. The streams of Cicero Creek, Dry Branch, East Fork Sly Run, Lily Vestal Drain, Hinkle Creek, Ingerman Ditch, Kirkendall Creek, Mallery Granger Ditch, Overdorff Branch, Stony Creek, and West Fork Sly Run run through this township.

=== Cities and towns ===
- Noblesville (vast majority)

=== Unincorporated communities ===
- Riverwood

=== Adjacent townships ===
- Jackson Township (north)
- White River Township (northeast)
- Wayne Township (east)
- Fall Creek Township (southeast)
- Delaware Township (south)
- Clay Township (southwest)
- Washington Township (west)

=== Cemeteries ===
The township contains eight cemeteries: Crownland, Gascho-Trissel, Gray, Hurlock, Riverside, Thorp, Weaver and Zimmer.

=== Major highways ===
- Indiana State Road 19
- Indiana State Road 32
- Indiana State Road 37
- Indiana State Road 38
- Indiana State Road 238

=== Airports and landing strips ===
- Roberts-Jacobi Restricted Airport

== Education ==
Noblesville Township residents may obtain a free library card from the Hamilton East Public Library in Noblesville city.
