= John Kinzer House =

- U.S. National Register of Historic Places
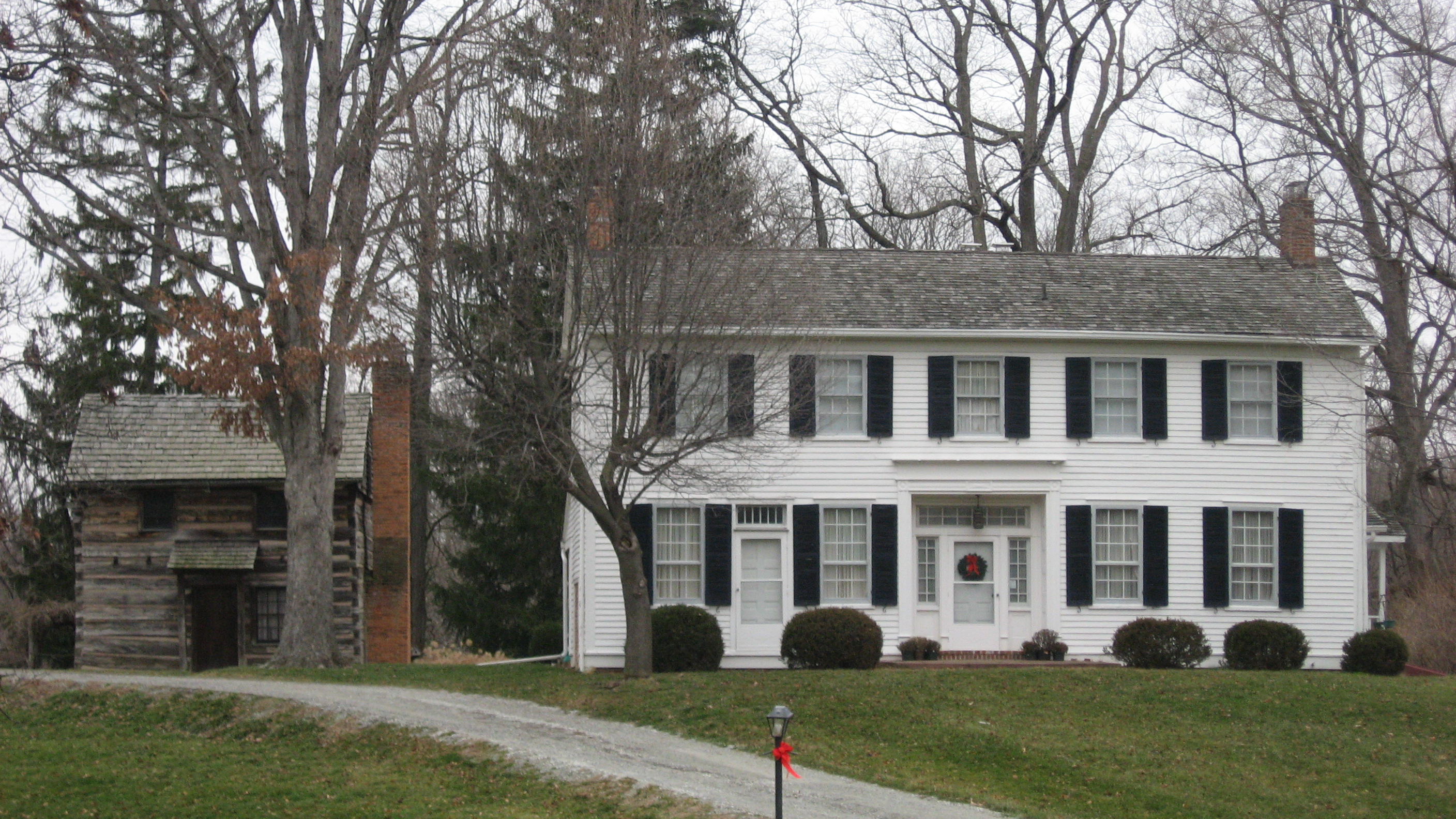
- The house in 2012

- Location within Indiana Location within the United States
- Nearest city: Carmel, Indiana
- Coordinates: 39°58′44″N 86°06′32″W
- Area: 2 acres (0.81 ha)
- Built: 1840
- Built by: John D. Kinzer
- Architectural style: Federal
- NRHP reference No.: 75000020
- Added to NRHP: September 5, 1975

The John Kinzer House is a historic house in Carmel, Indiana. It was built in the 1840s by John D. Kinzer, a settler who lived here with his wife and their seven children. Kinzer purchased the land from the federal government and initially built a much more modest cabin which still stands next to the main house; the cabin was built in 1828. The main house was designed in the Federal architectural style, with two stories and two chimneys. It has been listed on the National Register of Historic Places since September 5, 1975.
