= Dr. Samuel Harrell House =

Historic house in Indiana, United States

- U.S. National Register of Historic Places
- U.S. Historic district – Contributing property
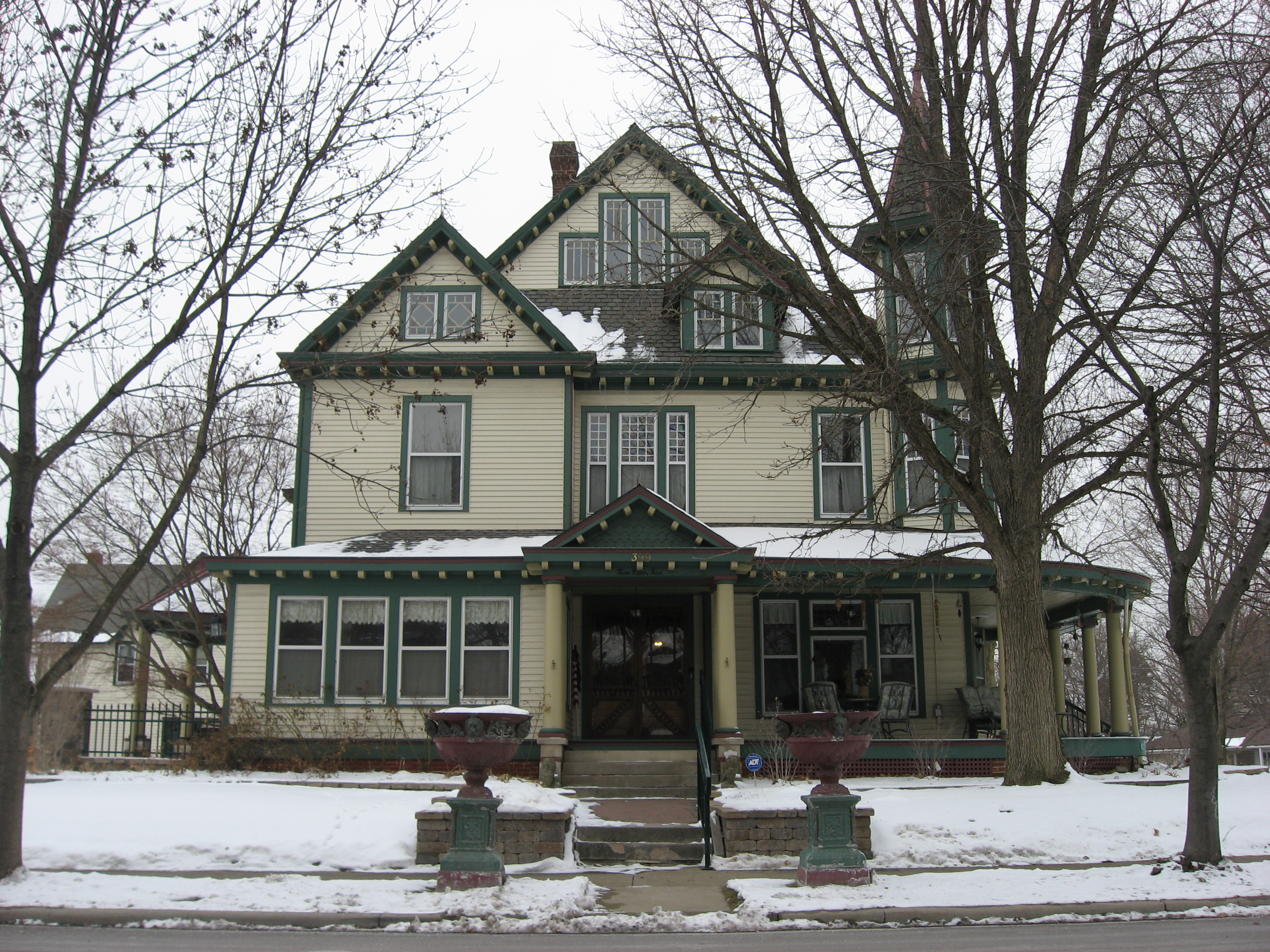
- Dr. Samuel Harrell House, January 2011

- Location within Indiana Location within the United States
- Location: 399 N. 10th St., Noblesville, Indiana
- Coordinates: 40°2′56″N 86°0′44″W
- Area: less than one acre
- Built: 1898
- Architectural style: Queen Anne
- NRHP reference No.: 84001040
- Added to NRHP: March 1, 1984

Dr. Samuel Harrell House, also known as the Harrell House, is a historic home located at Noblesville, Indiana. It was built in 1898, and is a large 2 1/2-story, Queen Anne style frame dwelling. It features irregular massing; a three-story, polygonal corner tower; multi gable-on-hip roof; and wraparound porch. Also on the property is a contributing two-story, frame carriage house.

It was listed on the National Register of Historic Places in 1984. It is located in the Catherine Street Historic District.
