= Noblesville Milling Company Mill =

- U.S. National Register of Historic Places
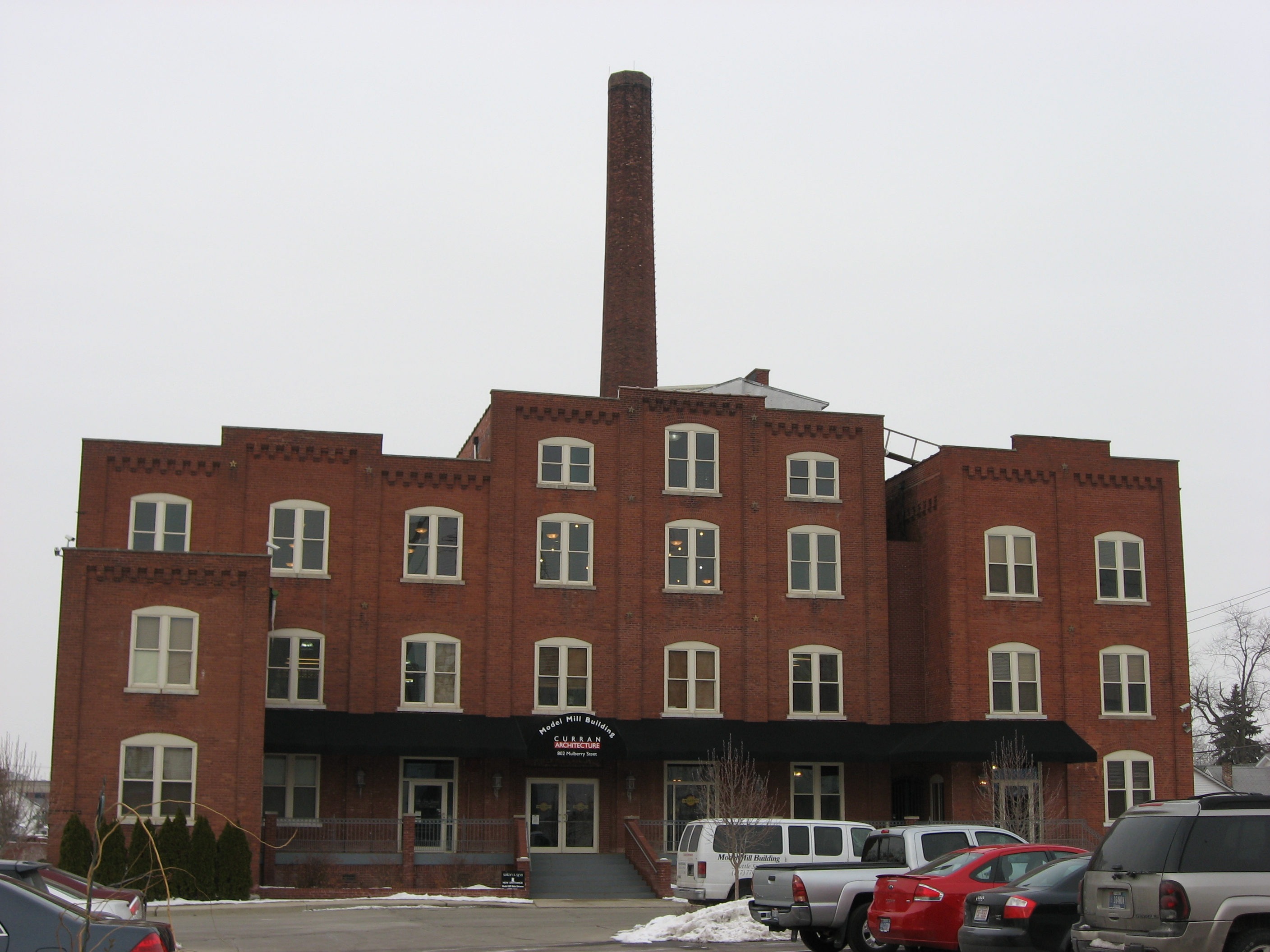
- Noblesville Milling Company Mill, January 2011

- Location within Indiana Location within the United States
- Location: South 8th St., Noblesville, Indiana
- Coordinates: 40°2′30″N 86°0′55″W
- Area: less than one acre
- Built: 1872
- Architectural style: Late Victorian
- MPS: Grain Mills in Indiana
- NRHP reference No.: 01001346
- Added to NRHP: December 7, 2001

Noblesville Milling Company Mill, also known as the Model Mill, is a historic grinding mill located at Noblesville, Indiana. The original section was built in about 1872, and subsequently expanded to cover 1/2 a city block. It is a large brick structure, with the largest section being four stories tall. It includes a water tower built about 1903. It was originally built as a planing mill, but later converted to a grinding mill to produce flour.

It was listed on the National Register of Historic Places in 2001.
