= Micah Newby House =

Historic house in Indiana, United States

- U.S. National Register of Historic Places
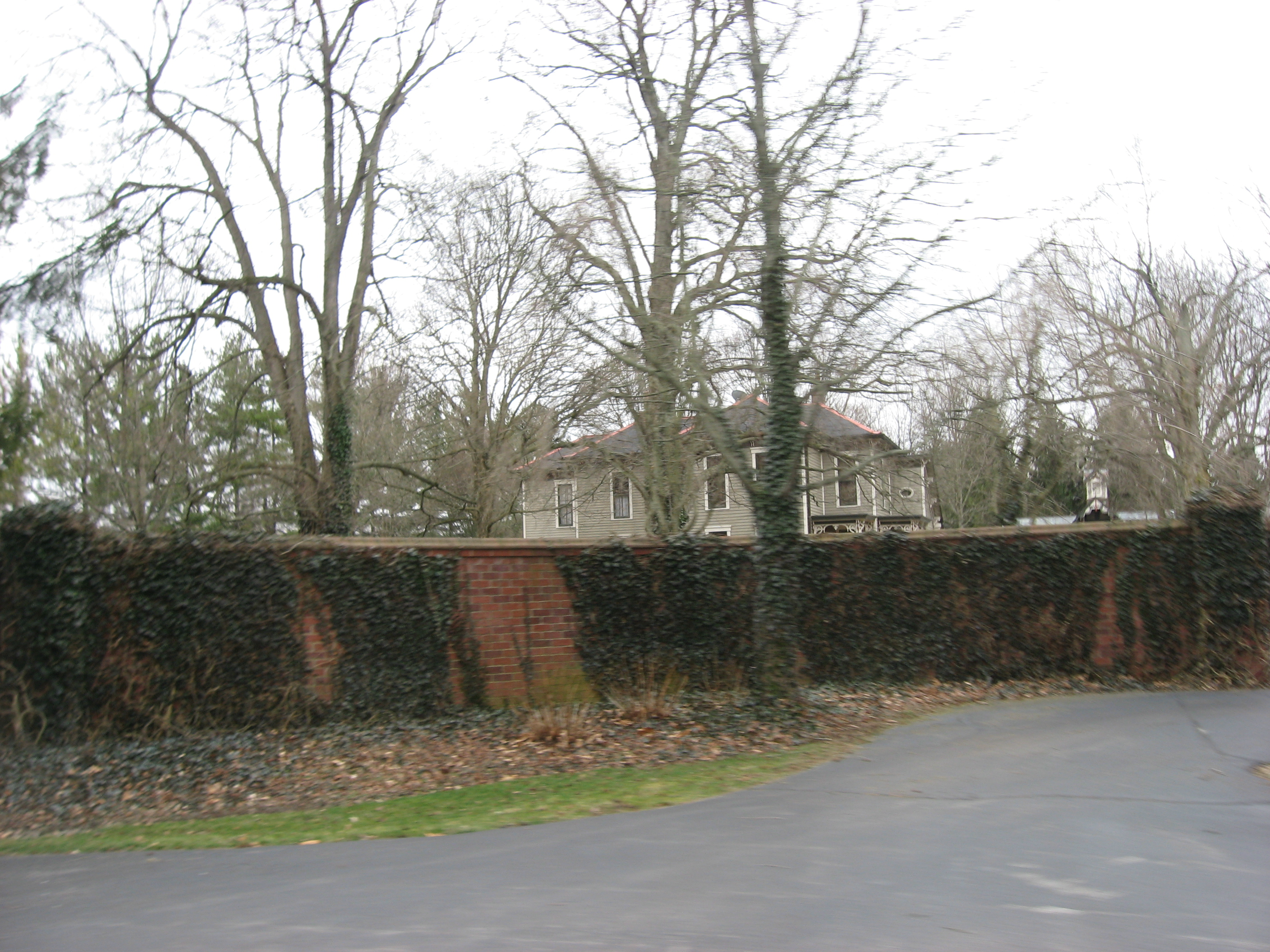
- Micah Newby House, March 2012

- Location within Indiana Location within the United States
- Location: 1149 W. 116th St., west of Carmel, in Clay Township, Hamilton County, Indiana
- Coordinates: 39°57′19″N 86°10′37″W
- Area: 1.9 acres (0.77 ha)
- Built: c. 1880
- Architectural style: Italianate
- NRHP reference No.: 86001349
- Added to NRHP: June 20, 1986

Micah Newby House, also known as the Newby-Bick House, is a historic home located in Clay Township, Hamilton County, Indiana. Records indicate that the farm was acquired in August, 1871, by Micah Newby from his father, John Henley Newby.

Although no precise date of construction is known, Ovid Newby, grandson of Micah Newby, documented that his father, John Absalom Newby, born 1877, was age four when the family finished the house (circa 1880). It is a two-story, nearly symmetrical T-shaped-plan frame home in the vernacular Italianate style. It was restored in the 1980s.

It was listed on the National Register of Historic Places in 1986.
