= Hamilton County Courthouse Square =

- U.S. National Register of Historic Places
- U.S. Historic district – Contributing property
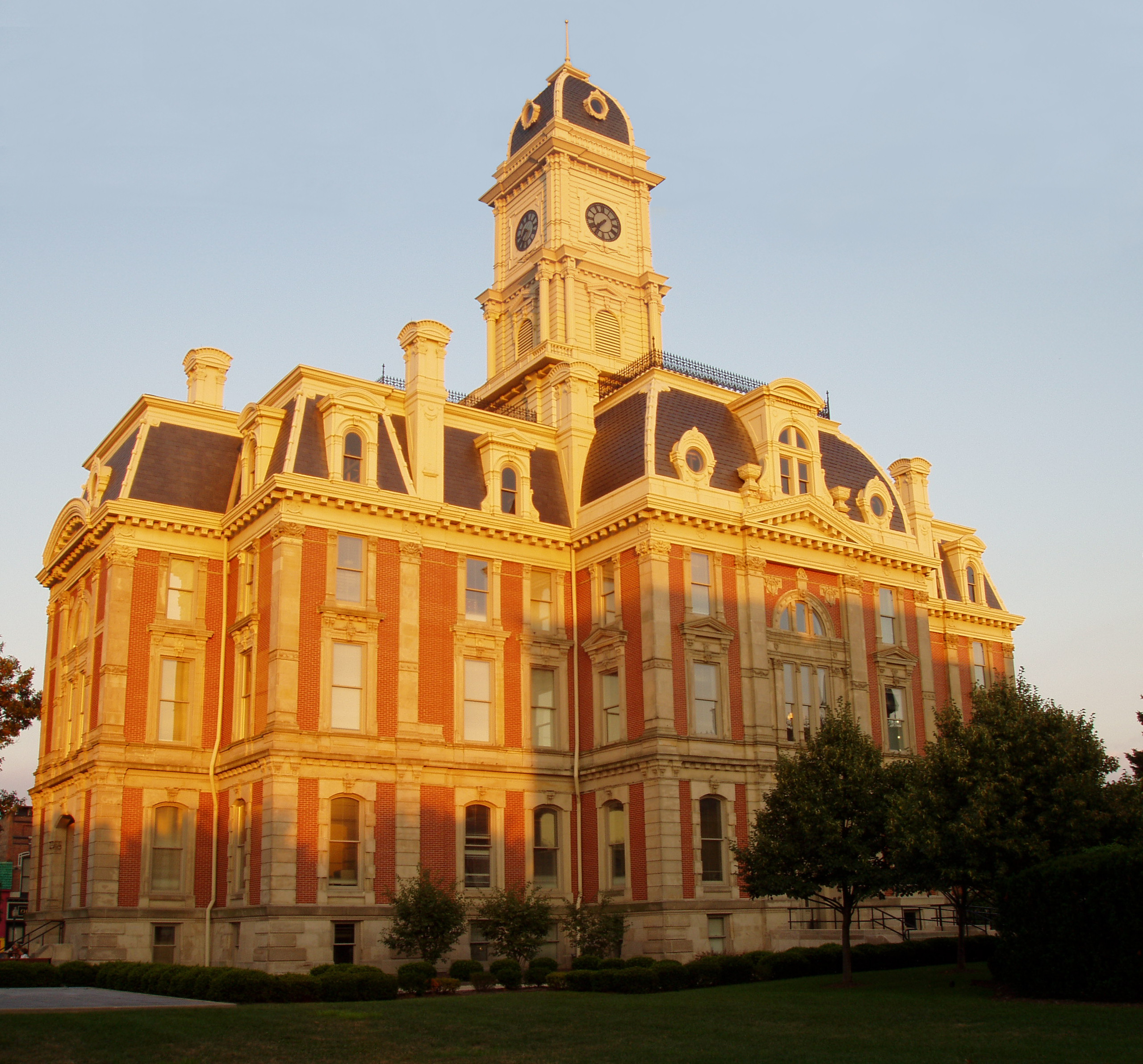
- Hamilton County Courthouse, July 2005

- Location within Indiana Location within the United States
- Interactive map showing the location for Hamilton County Courthouse Square
- Location: Bounded by Logan, 8th, 9th, and Conner Sts., Noblesville, Indiana
- Coordinates: 40°2′45″N 86°00′51″W
- Area: 1.8 acres (0.73 ha)
- Built: 1875-1876, 1877-1879
- Architect: Parsons, W.R.; May, Edwin
- Architectural style: Second Empire
- Part of: Noblesville Commercial Historic District (ID91001862)
- NRHP reference No.: 78000033

Significant dates
- Added to NRHP: May 10, 1978
- Designated CP: December 19, 1991

Hamilton County Courthouse Square is a historic courthouse and jail located at Noblesville, Indiana. The jail was built in 1875–1876, and is a Second Empire style brick and limestone building. It consists of the two-story, ell-shaped jailer's residence, with a cellblock attached at the rear. It features a three-story square tower that once had a mansard roof. The courthouse was built between 1877 and 1879, and is a three-story, Second Empire style, rectangular brick building. It has a clock tower atop the mansard roof and limestone Corinthian order pilasters.

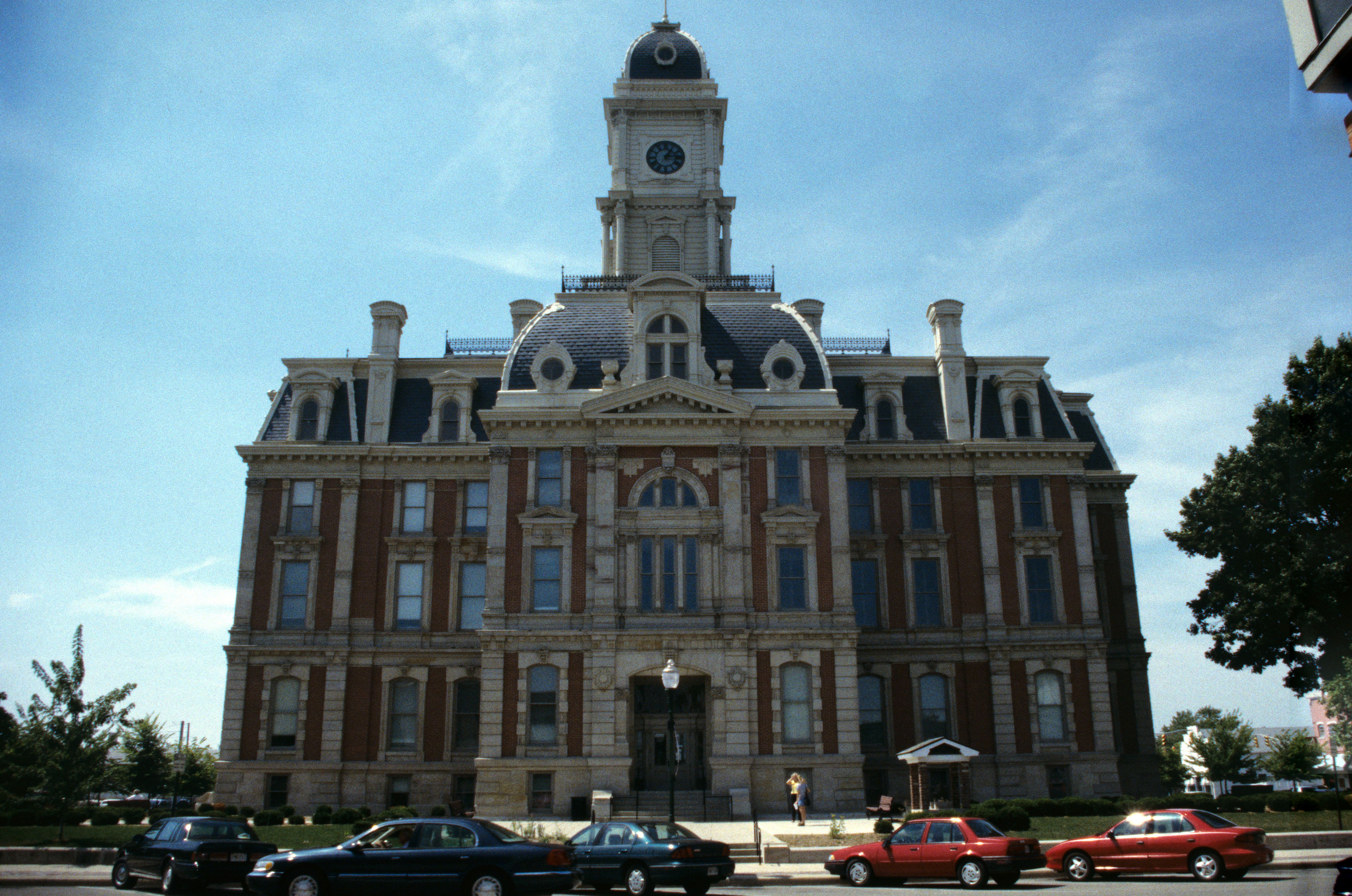
Hamilton County Courthouse

It was listed on the National Register of Historic Places in 1978. The buildings are also included as contributing buildings in the Noblesville Commercial Historic District, which was NRHP-listed in 1991.

This Noblesville, Indiana courtroom is where Ku Klux Klan Grand Dragon D. C. Stephenson was tried and convicted of murder on Nov 14, 1925.
