= Clay Township, Hamilton County, Indiana =

Clay Township
- Township
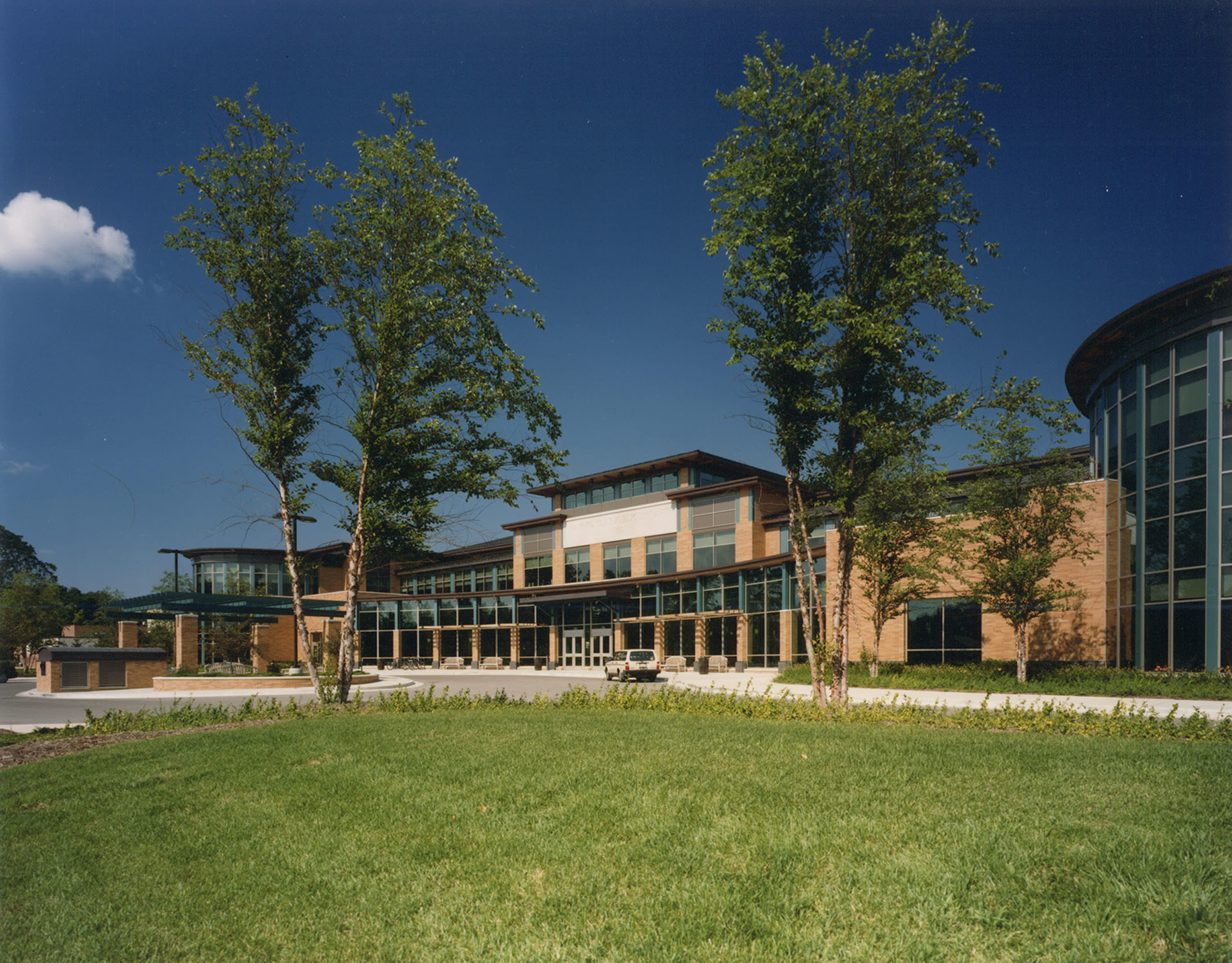
- Carmel Clay Public Library

- Location in Hamilton County
- Coordinates: 39°57′48″N 86°08′54″W
- Country: United States
- State: Indiana
- County: Hamilton
- Settled: 1802
- Organized: 1833

Government
  - Type: Indiana township
  - Trustee: Paul Hensel

Area
  - Total: 50.20 sq mi (130.03 km^{2})
  - Land: 49.12 sq mi (127.23 km^{2})
  - Water: 1.08 sq mi (2.80 km^{2})
- Elevation: 843 ft (257 m)

Population (2020)
  - Total: 99,093
  - Density: 2,017.2/sq mi (778.85/km^{2})
- Time zone: UTC-5 (EST)
  - Summer (DST): UTC-4 (EDT)
- ZIP codes: 46032, 46033, 46074, 46077, 46082, 46260, 46280, 46290
- Area codes: 317, 463
- FIPS code: 18-13060
- GNIS feature ID: 453209
- Website: claytwp.org

Clay Township is one of nine townships in Hamilton County, Indiana, United States. As of the 2020 census, its population was 99,093. Since the annexation of Home Place, Indiana, Carmel is now completely coterminous with the township.

== History ==
Clay Township was organized in 1833.

Micah Newby House was listed on the National Register of Historic Places in 1986.

== Geography ==
According to the 2020 census, the township has a total area of 50.205 square miles (130.03 km^{2}), of which 49.123 square miles (127.23 km^{2}) is land and 1.082 square miles (2.80 km^{2}) is water. The streams of Almond Ditch, Ams Run, Blue Woods Creek, Boone Creek, Center Creek, Clay Creek, Cool Creek, Elliot Creek, Lily Vestal Drain, Henley Creek, Highway Run, Hot Lick Creek, Kirkendall Creek, Lion Creek, Little Cool Creek, Long Branch, Mitchener Ditch, Spring Mill Run, Well Run, Will Creek, and Witt Creek run through this township.

=== Cities and towns ===
- Carmel

=== Adjacent townships ===
- Washington Township (north)
- Noblesville Township (northeast)
- Delaware Township (east)
- Washington Township, Marion County (south)
- Pike Township, Marion County (southwest)
- Eagle Township, Boone County (west)
- Union Township, Boone County (northwest)

=== Cemeteries ===
The township contains six cemeteries: Calvary, Carmel, Farley, Pleasant Grove, Poplar Ridge, and White Chapel.

=== Major highways ===
- Interstate 465
- U.S. Route 31
- U.S. Route 421
- State Road 234
- State Road 431
