= William Houston Craig House =

Historic house in Indiana, United States

- U.S. National Register of Historic Places
- U.S. Historic district – Contributing property
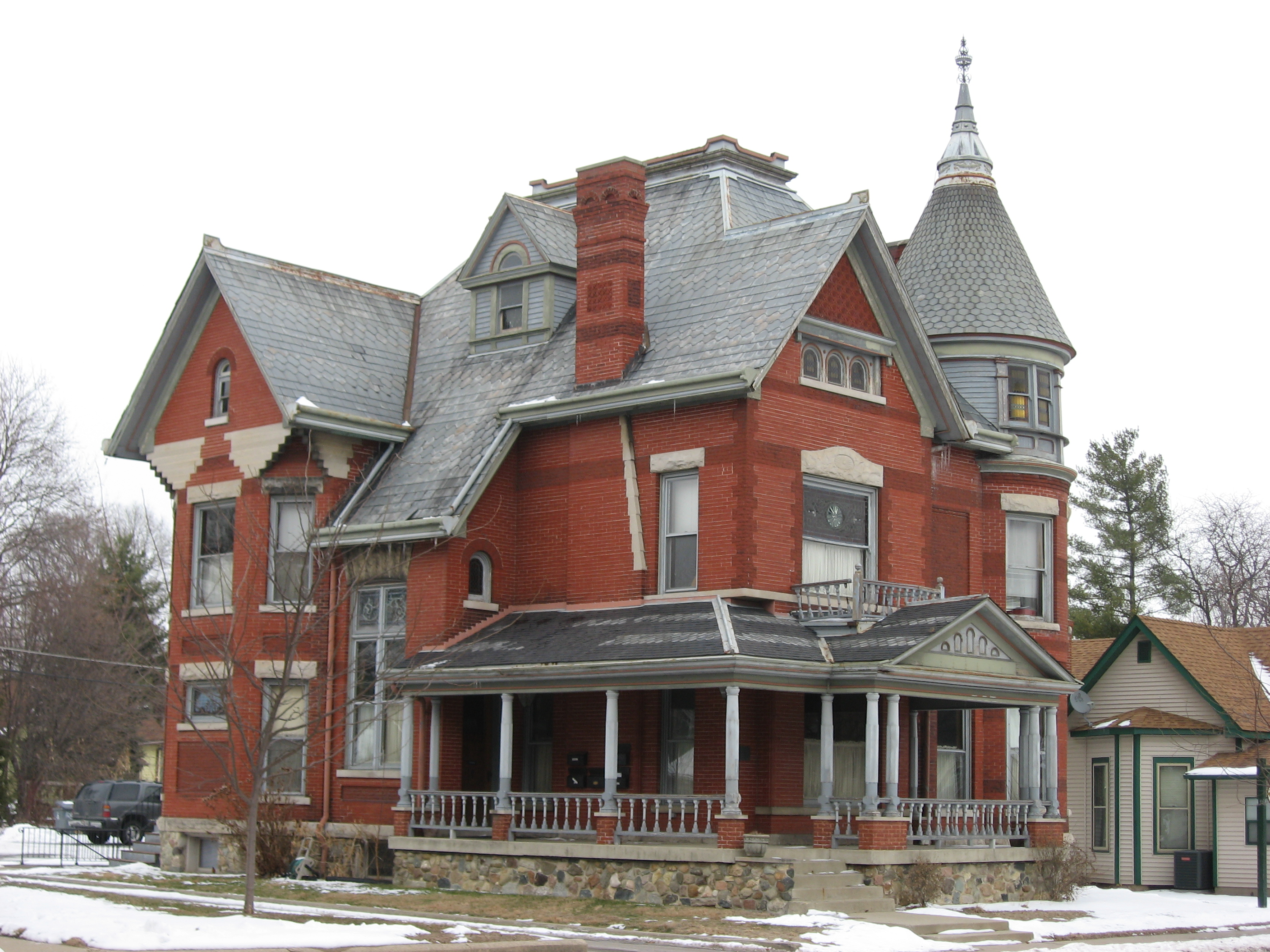
- William Houston Craig House, January 2011

- Location within Indiana Location within the United States
- Location: 1250 E. Conner St., Noblesville, Indiana
- Coordinates: 40°2′45″N 86°0′34″W
- Area: less than one acre
- Built: 1893
- Architectural style: Queen Anne, Romanesque
- NRHP reference No.: 90000808
- Added to NRHP: May 24, 1990

William Houston Craig House is a historic home located at Noblesville, Indiana. It was built in 1893, and is a large 2 1/2-story, brick dwelling with Romanesque Revival and Queen Anne style design elements. It features multiple projections, porches, and a corner tower with rock faced stone details and contrasting textures and materials.

It was listed on the National Register of Historic Places in 1990. It is located in the Conner Street Historic District.
