= Noblesville Commercial Historic District =

Historic district in Indiana, United States

- U.S. National Register of Historic Places
- U.S. Historic district
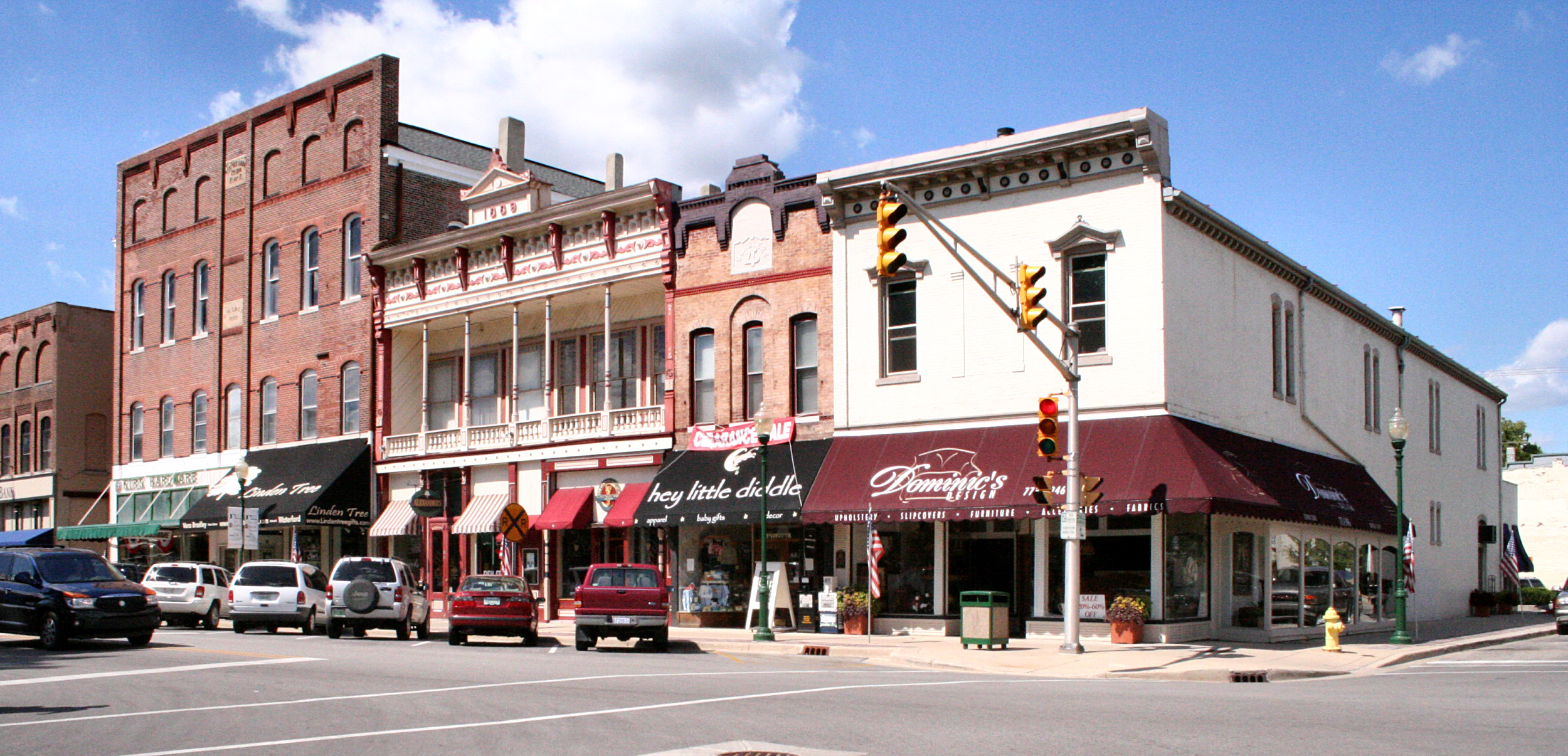
- Noblesville Commercial Historic District, September 2005

- Location within Indiana Location within the United States
- Location: Roughly bounded by Clinton, 10th, Maple and 8th Sts., Noblesville, Indiana
- Coordinates: 40°2′44″N 86°00′49″W
- Area: 14 acres (5.7 ha)
- Architect: May, Edwin; Parsons, William R.
- Architectural style: Renaissance, Gothic, Italianate
- NRHP reference No.: 91001862
- Added to NRHP: December 19, 1991

Noblesville Commercial Historic District is a national historic district located at Noblesville, Indiana. It encompasses 54 contributing buildings in the central business district of Noblesville. It developed between about 1875 and 1931, and includes notable examples of Gothic Revival, Italianate, and Renaissance Revival style architecture. Located in the district is the separately listed Hamilton County Courthouse Square, which includes the courthouse (1877–1879) and Sheriff's Residence and Jail (1875). Other notable buildings include the Indiana Union Traction Company Station (1906), Lacy Block (1888), Evers Block (1889), U.S. Post Office (1906), U.S. Post Office (1931), and First Christian Church (1897–1898).

It was listed on the National Register of Historic Places in 1991.
