= Robert L. Wilson House =

Historic house in Indiana, United States

- U.S. National Register of Historic Places
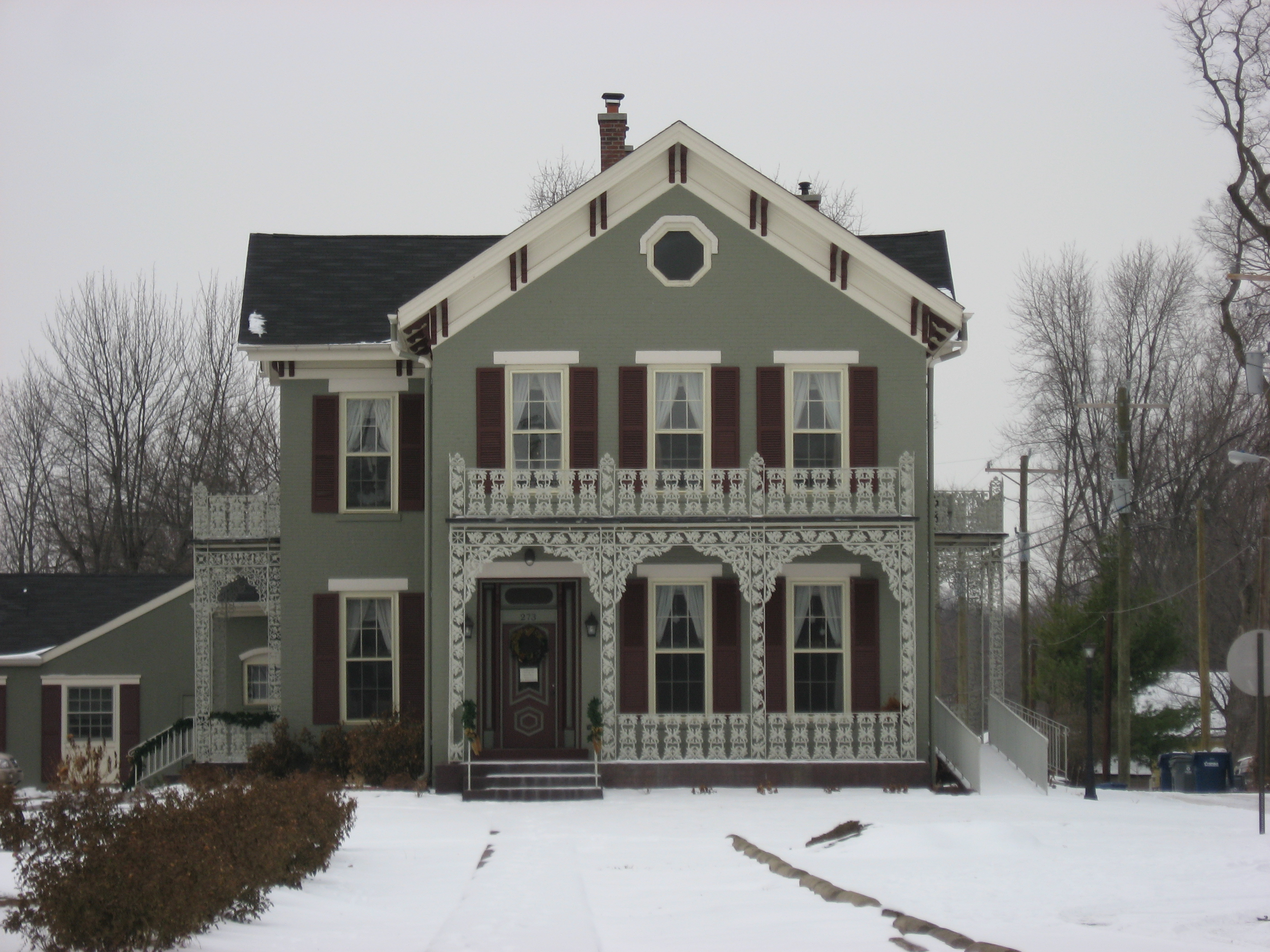
- Robert L. Wilson House, January 2011

- Location within Indiana Location within the United States
- Location: 273 S. 8th St., Noblesville, Indiana
- Coordinates: 40°2′43″N 86°0′55″W
- Area: less than one acre
- Built: c. 1868, 1898
- Architect: Wild, Leonard W.
- Architectural style: Italianate
- NRHP reference No.: 08000918
- Added to NRHP: September 17, 2008

Robert L. Wilson House is a historic home located at Noblesville, Indiana. The oldest section is dated to the late-1860s, and is a two-story, Italianate style brick dwelling. It consists of four sections and was likely constructed in three parts, taking its present form by 1898. The house features three two-level cast iron porches.

It was listed on the National Register of Historic Places in 2008.
