= Catherine Street Historic District =

Historic district in Indiana, United States

- U.S. National Register of Historic Places
- U.S. Historic district
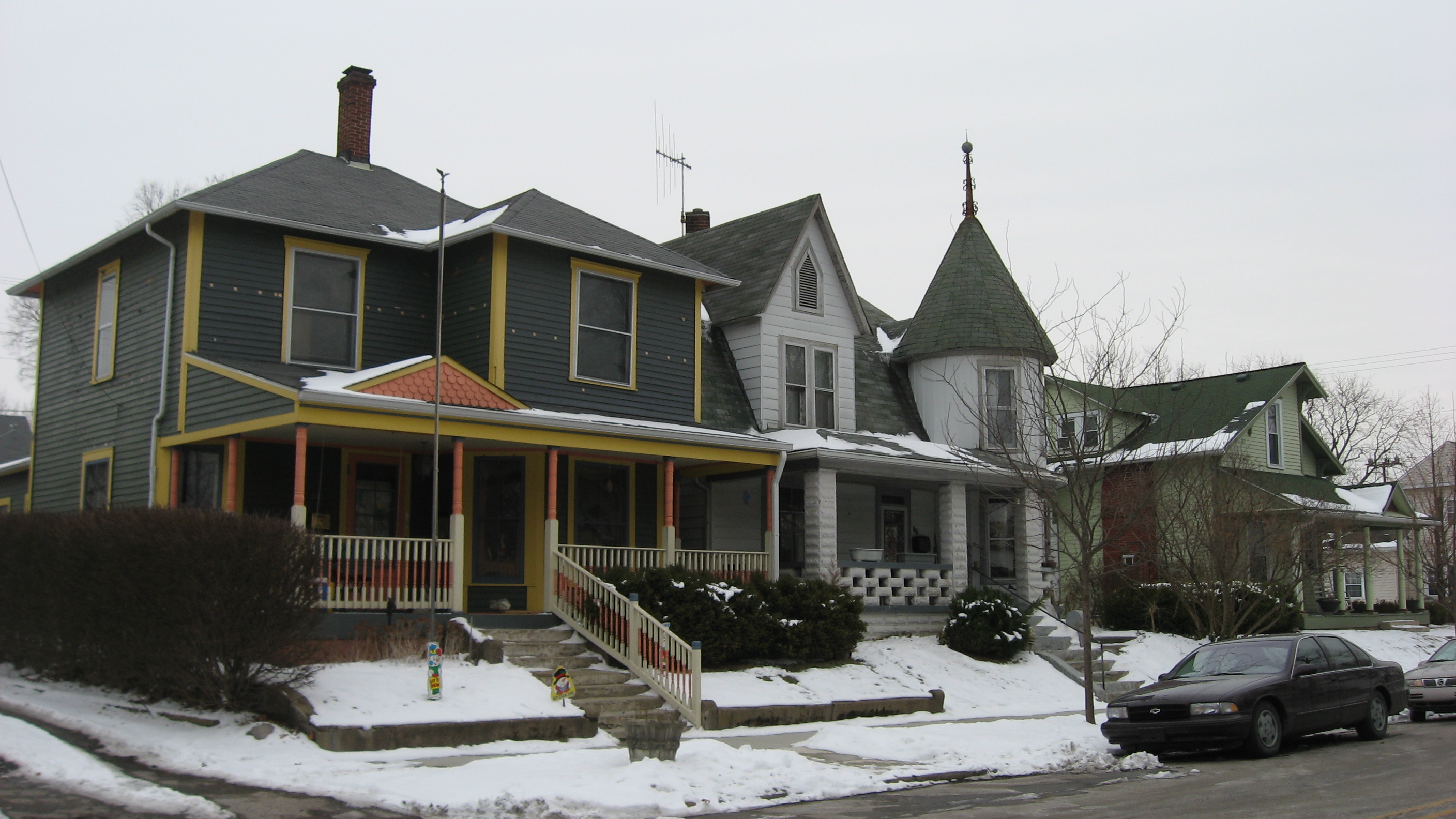
- Catherine Street Historic District, January 2011

- Location within Indiana Location within the United States
- Location: Roughly bounded by Harrison, Clinton, west side of 9th and east side of 10th, Noblesville, Indiana
- Coordinates: 40°2′54″N 86°00′46″W
- Area: 4.3 acres (1.7 ha)
- Architectural style: Queen Anne, Italianate, Bungalow/Craftsman
- NRHP reference No.: 01000988
- Added to NRHP: September 16, 2001

Catherine Street Historic District, also known as the North 9th St. Historic District, is a national historic district located at Noblesville, Indiana. It encompasses 50 contributing buildings and 1 contributing site in a predominantly residential section of Noblesville. It developed between about 1870 and 1937, and includes notable examples of Queen Anne, Italianate, and Bungalow / American Craftsman style architecture. Located in the district is the separately listed Dr. Samuel Harrell House.

It was listed on the National Register of Historic Places in 2001.
