= Daniel Craycraft House =

Historic house in Indiana, United States

- U.S. National Register of Historic Places
- U.S. Historic district – Contributing property
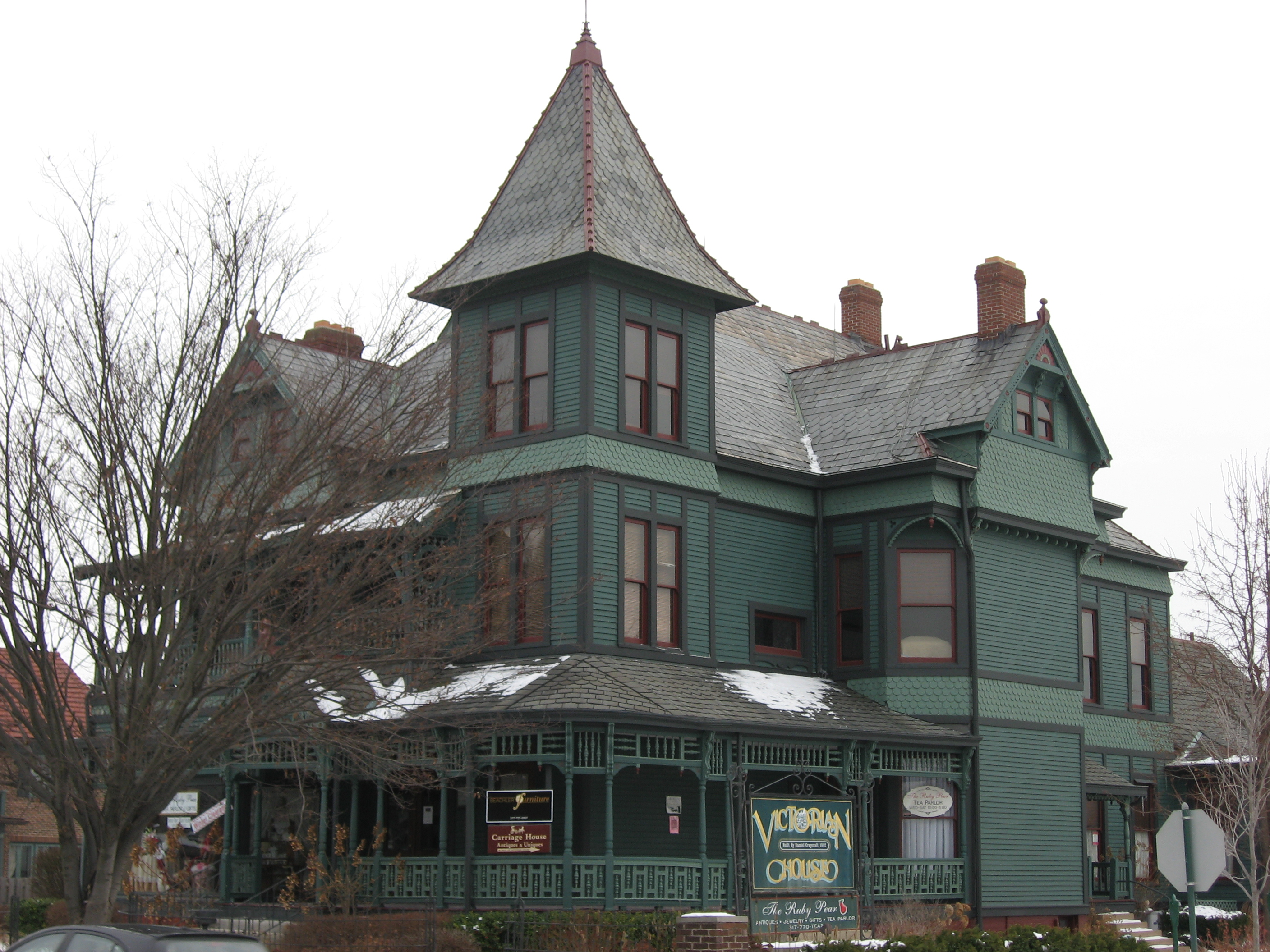
- Daniel Craycraft House, January 2011

- Location within Indiana Location within the United States
- Location: 1095 E. Conner St., Noblesville, Indiana
- Coordinates: 40°2′43″N 86°0′39″W
- Area: less than one acre
- Built: 1892
- Architectural style: Queen Anne
- NRHP reference No.: 88003040
- Added to NRHP: January 4, 1989

Daniel Craycraft House is a historic home located at Noblesville, Indiana. It was built in 1892, and is a large 2 1/2-story, Queen Anne style frame dwelling. It features a three-story, square corner tower; cross-gables; steep gable-on-hip roof; porches and balconies; and contrasting textures and materials.

It was listed on the National Register of Historic Places in 1989. It is located in the Conner Street Historic District.
