= South 9th Street Historic District =

Historic district in Indiana, United States

- U.S. National Register of Historic Places
- U.S. Historic district
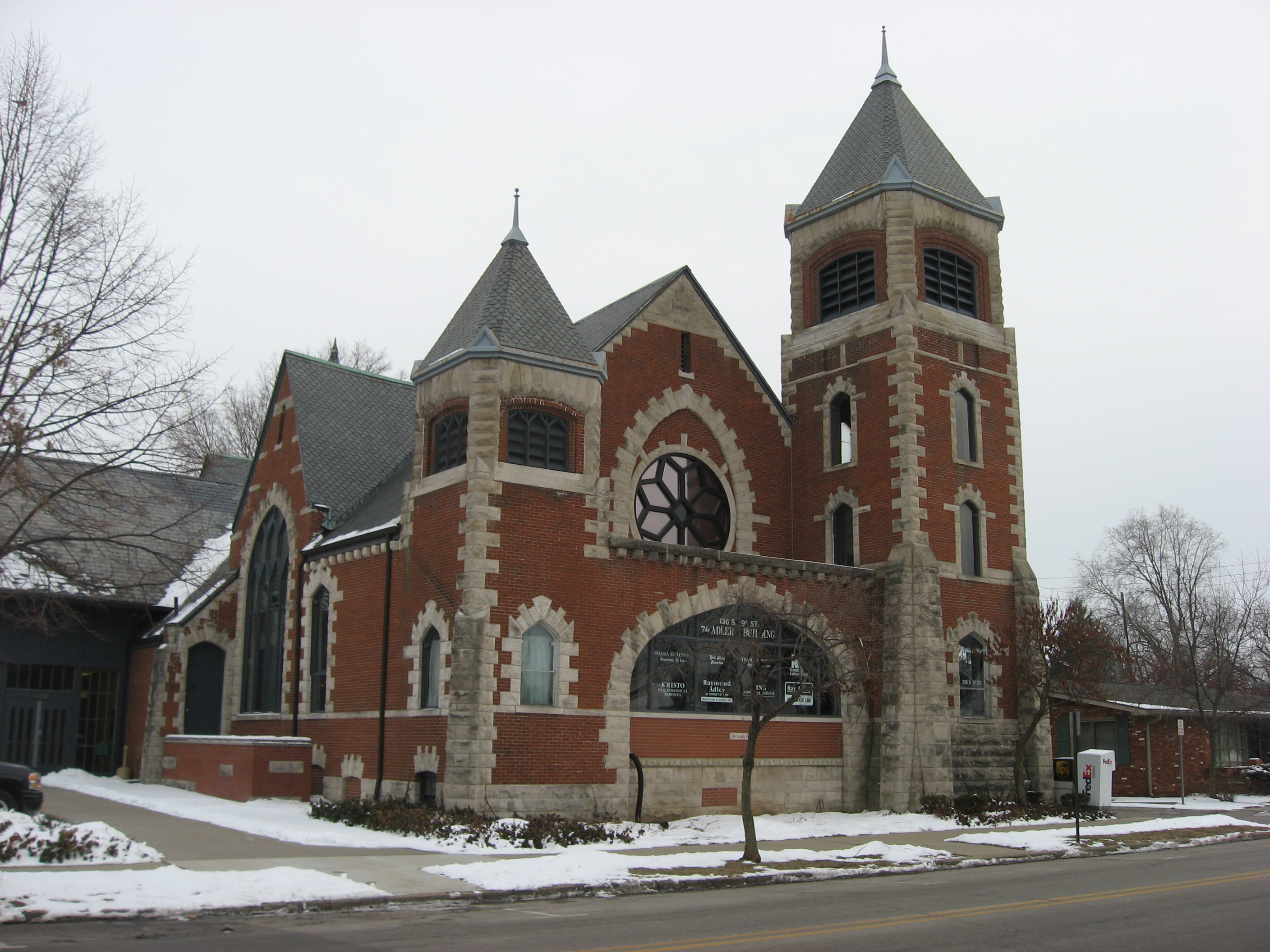
- Adler Building, January 2011

- Location within Indiana Location within the United States
- Location: Roughly bounded by Maple, Division, 10th, and the west side of 9th St., Noblesville, Indiana
- Coordinates: 40°2′35″N 86°00′48″W
- Area: 5.3 acres (2.1 ha)
- Architect: Booth, Aaron D.
- Architectural style: Queen Anne, Italianate, Bungalow/Craftsman
- NRHP reference No.: 01000982
- Added to NRHP: September 16, 2001

South 9th Street Historic District is a national historic district located at Noblesville, Indiana. It encompasses 39 contributing buildings and one contributing site in a predominantly residential section of Noblesville. It developed between about 1860 and 1940, and includes notable examples of Queen Anne, Italianate, and Bungalow / American Craftsman style architecture. Notable buildings include the Masonic Temple (c. 1914) and Adler Building (formerly First Christian Church, 1897).

It was listed on the National Register of Historic Places in 2001.
