= Indiana State Road 238 =

State highway in Indiana, United States

State Road 238

- Former SR 238 (Eastern) in red; Western in Light Gray

Route information
- Maintained by INDOT
- Length: 10.41 mi (16.75 km)
- Existed: 1930s–2010s

Major junctions
- West end: SR 37 in Noblesville (At route establishment); I-69 near Fishers (Truncated)
- East end: SR 13 at Fortville

Location
- Country: United States
- State: Indiana
- Counties: Hamilton, Hancock, Madison

Highway system
- Indiana State Highway System; Interstate; US; State; Scenic
| ← SR 237 | → SR 240 |

State Road 238 (SR 238) was a short 6 miles (9.7 km) stretch of two-lane undivided road, mostly in Hamilton County, that traveled southeast from near Fishers (a northeast suburb of Indianapolis) to Fortville. The western portion was concurrent with Greenfield Avenue.

== Route description ==
SR 238 heads southeast from the interchange with Interstate 69, heading toward Fortville. In Fortville, SR 238 enters town on Merrill Street and turns onto Michigan Street. At the intersection of Michigan Street and Main Street in Fortville is the eastern terminus of SR 238 at State Road 13.

== History ==
SR 238 connected Fortville and its western terminus at SR 37 in Noblesville.

== Major intersections ==
| County | Location | mi | km | Destinations | Notes |
|---|---|---|---|---|---|
| Hamilton | Fall Creek Township | 0.00 | 0.00 | I-69 – Indianapolis, Fort Wayne | Western terminus of SR 238 |
| Madison | No major junctions | | | | |
| Hancock | Fortville | 10.41 | 16.75 | SR 13 – Lapel | Eastern terminus of SR 238 |
1.000 mi = 1.609 km; 1.000 km = 0.621 mi
