= Judge Earl S. Stone House =

Historic house in Indiana, United States

- U.S. National Register of Historic Places
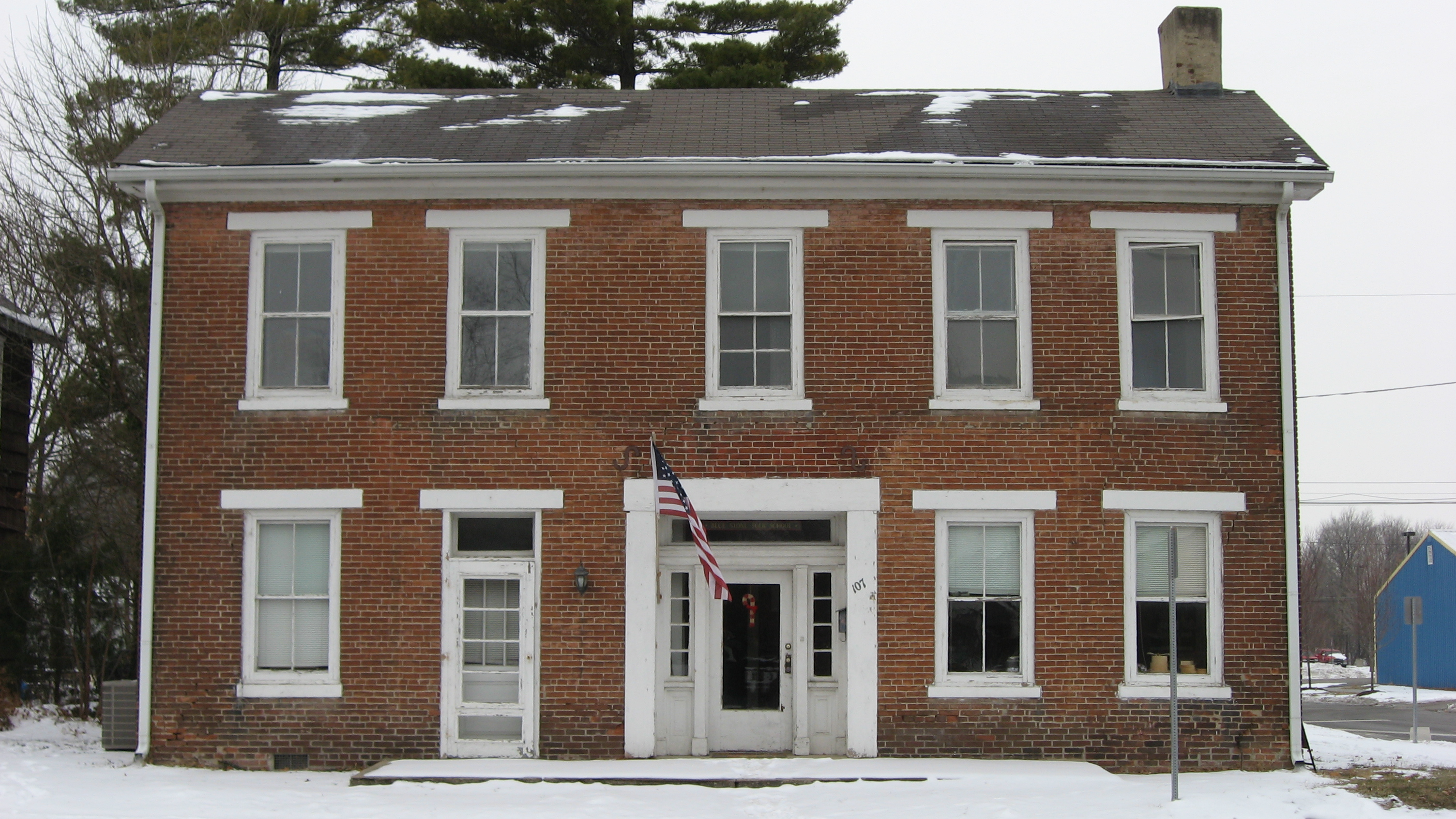
- Judge Earl S. Stone House, January 2011

- Location within Indiana Location within the United States
- Location: 107 S. 8th St., Noblesville, Indiana
- Coordinates: 40°2′40″N 86°0′54″W
- Area: less than one acre
- Built: 1849
- Architectural style: Greek Revival
- NRHP reference No.: 78000034
- Added to NRHP: December 8, 1978

Judge Earl S. Stone House is a historic home located at Noblesville, Indiana. It was built in 1849, and is a two-story, five-bay, L-shaped, Greek Revival style brick dwelling. It is probably the oldest building in Noblesville.

It was listed on the National Register of Historic Places in 1978.
