= Conner Street Historic District =

Historic district in Indiana, United States

- U.S. National Register of Historic Places
- U.S. Historic district
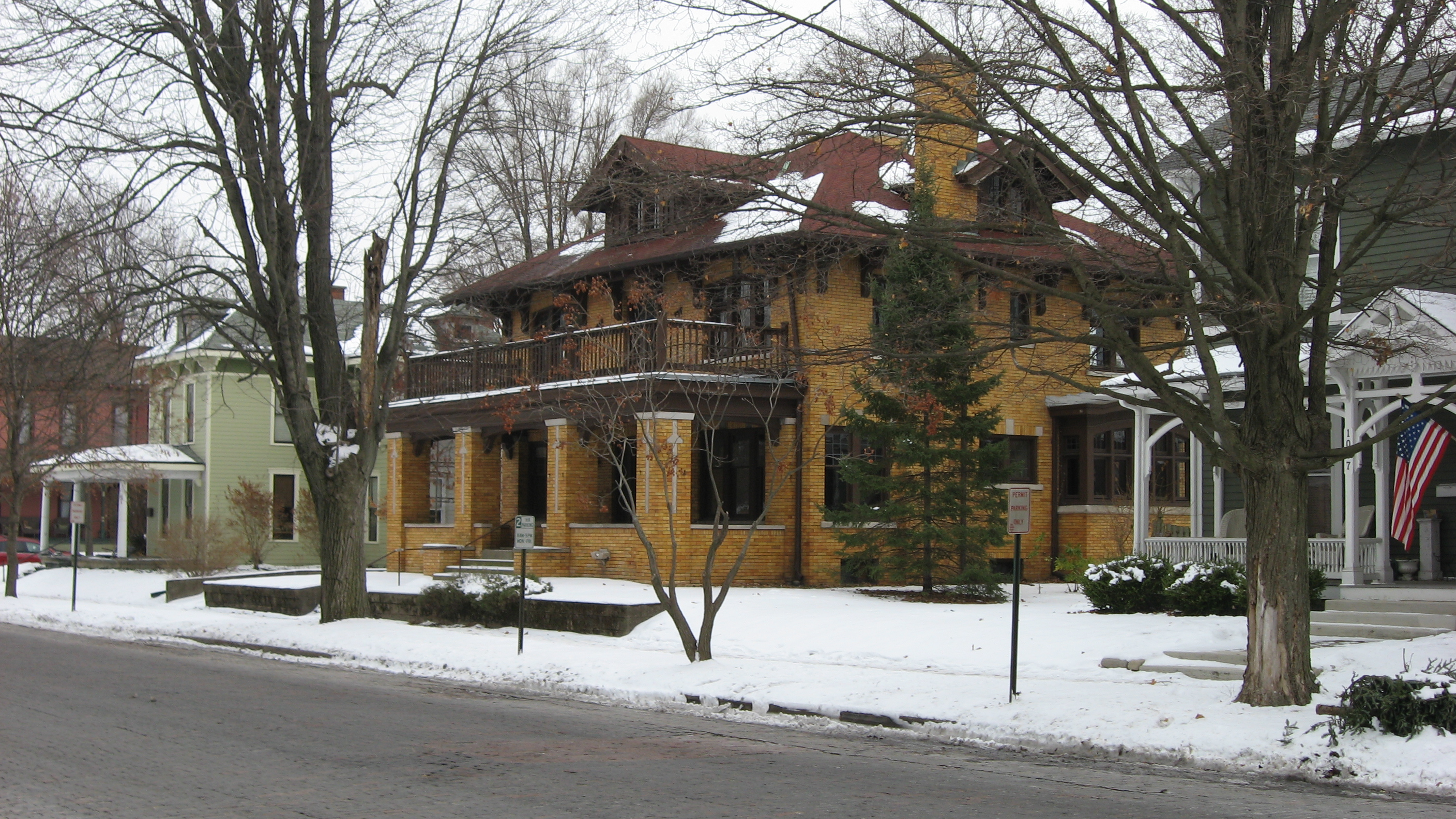
- Conner Street Historic District, January 2011

- Location within Indiana Location within the United States
- Location: Roughly both sides of Logan and Conner Sts. between 10th and 17th., Noblesville, Indiana
- Coordinates: 40°2′46″N 86°00′29″W
- Area: 35 acres (14 ha)
- Architect: Sears and Roebuck
- Architectural style: Late Victorian, Late 19th And 20th Century Revivals
- NRHP reference No.: 99000296
- Added to NRHP: March 12, 1999

Conner Street Historic District is a national historic district located at Noblesville, Indiana.

It encompasses 146 contributing buildings in a predominantly residential section of Noblesville. It developed between about 1840 and 1947, and includes notable examples of Queen Anne, Italianate, Colonial Revival, Classical Revival, and Bungalow / American Craftsman style architecture. Located in the district are the separately listed William Houston Craig House and Daniel Craycraft House. Other notable buildings include the Heylmann House (c. 1910), Gaeth House (c. 1905), Wild House (c. 1905), Noblesville High School Gymnasium (c. 1923 / 1990), First Presbyterian Church (c. 1893 / 1989), and Charles Swain House (c. 1852).

The location is noted for its natural gas and railroads.

It was listed on the National Register of Historic Places in 1999.

In 2005, the Indiana Historical Bureau installed a historical marker at 1039 Logan Street, Noblesville.
