= Potter's Covered Bridge =

- U.S. National Register of Historic Places
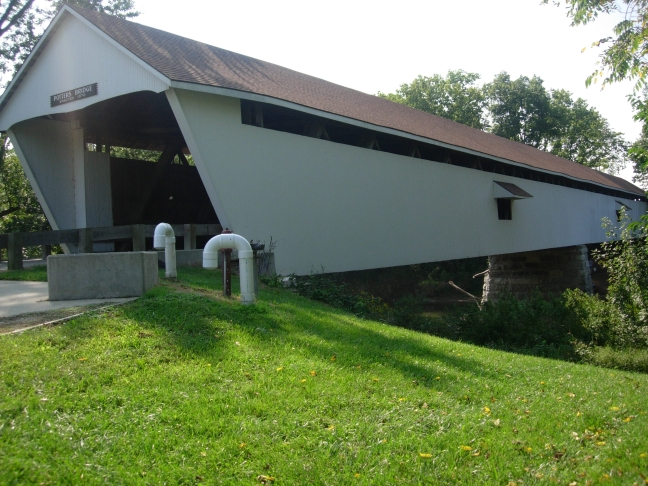
- Potters Bridge, March 2005

- Location within Indiana Location within the United States
- Location: Allisonville Rd. across the White River, Noblesville, Indiana
- Coordinates: 40°4′21″N 86°0′2″W
- Area: less than one acre
- Built: 1871
- Built by: Durfee, Josiah & Co.
- Architectural style: Howe Truss
- NRHP reference No.: 91001866
- Added to NRHP: December 19, 1991

Potter's Covered Bridge, also known as Potter's Bridge and Potter's Ford Bridge, is a historic covered bridge located in Potter's Bridge Park in Noblesville, Indiana. It was built in 1871, and is a Howe truss structure measuring 260 feet long, 22 feet wide, and 20 feet tall. The single span bridge rests on limestone abutments and has walls clad in vertical board siding.

It was listed on the National Register of Historic Places in 1991. Potter's Bridge Park has been home to the Potter's Bridge Fall Festival, occurring every October, for over 20 years.

In 1860, William Potter commissioned the bridge to be built. In 1971, the bridge was leased to the Parks and Recreation Department of Hamilton County and the park that hosts the bridge opened in 1999.

In 2007, a historical marker was installed by the Indiana History Bureau on 19401 North Allisonville Road, Noblesville.
