= Holliday Hydroelectric Powerhouse and Dam =

- U.S. National Register of Historic Places
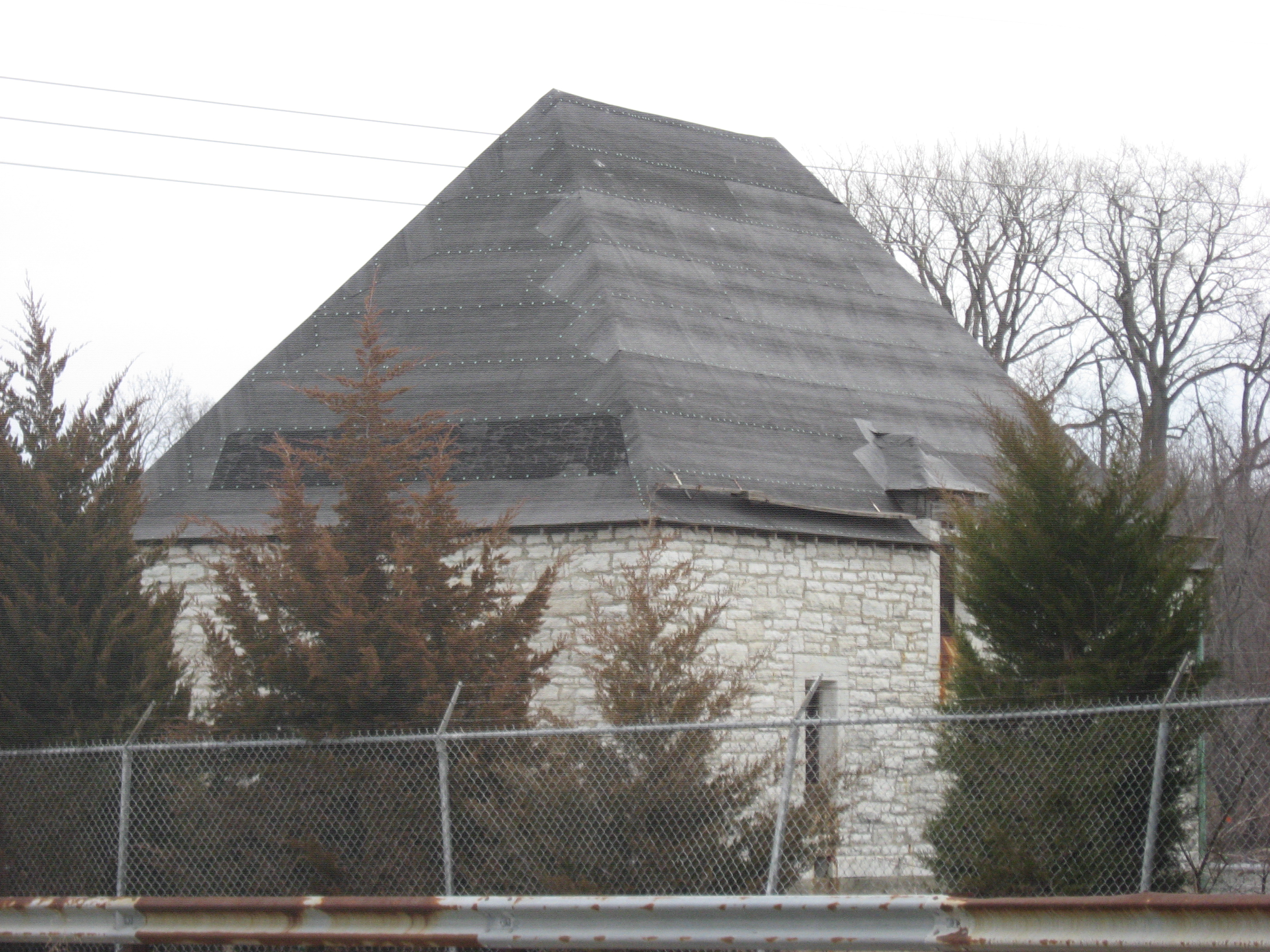
- Holliday Hydroelectric Dam Powerhouse, January 2012

- Location within Indiana Location within the United States
- Location: Riverwood Ave. at its junction with 211th St., across the White River northeast of Noblesville, Noblesville Township, Hamilton County, Indiana
- Coordinates: 40°05′42″N 85°58′08″W
- Area: less than one acre
- Built: 1922
- Built by: Holliday, Alex; Mott, Samuel
- Architectural style: Chateauesque
- NRHP reference No.: 95000706
- Added to NRHP: June 9, 1995

Holliday Hydroelectric Powerhouse and Dam, also known as Holliday Station, is a historic powerhouse and dam located on the White River near Noblesville in Noblesville Township, Hamilton County, Indiana. It was built in 1922, and includes a one-story Châteauesque style powerhouse building and a concrete dam measuring 10 feet high and 345 feet long. The powerhouse measures 26 feet wide and 40 feet long and is constructed of stone with a slate roof.

It was listed on the National Register of Historic Places in 1995.
