= Noblesville, Indiana =

- City
- City of Noblesville
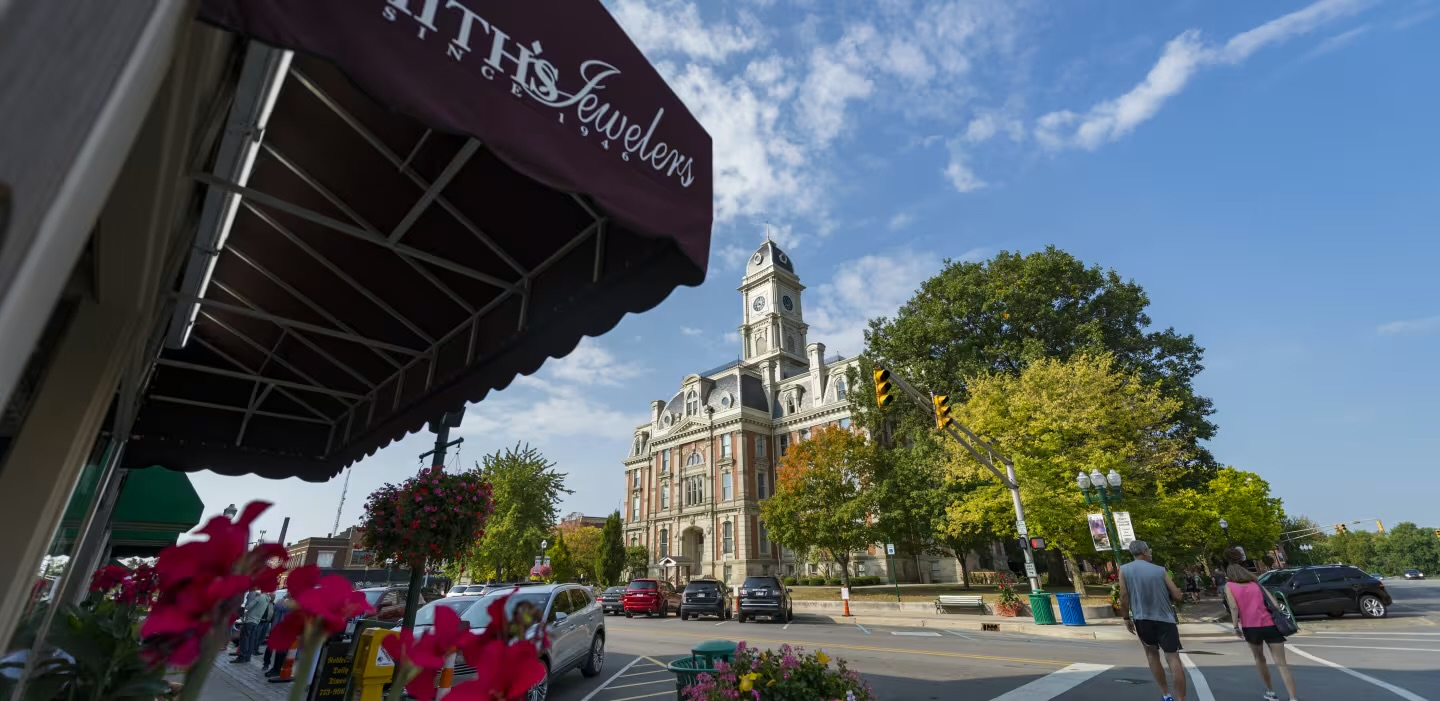
- Downtown Noblesville

- Flag Seal Logo
- Motto: The Heart of Hamilton County
- Location of Noblesville in Hamilton County, Indiana.
- Coordinates: 40°01′30″N 85°57′10″W
- Country: United States
- State: Indiana
- County: Hamilton
- Townships: Noblesville, Wayne, Fall Creek, Delaware
- Founded: 1823
- Incorporated (town): 1851
- Incorporated (city): May 6, 1887

Government
  - Mayor: Chris Jensen (R)

Area
  - Total: 35.82 sq mi (92.77 km^{2})
  - Land: 34.38 sq mi (89.04 km^{2})
  - Water: 1.42 sq mi (3.69 km^{2})
- Elevation: 771 ft (235 m)

Population (2020)
  - Total: 69,604
  - Density: 2,023.7/sq mi (781.34/km^{2})
- Time zone: UTC−5 (EST)
  - Summer (DST): UTC−4 (EDT)
- ZIP codes: 46060, 46061, 46062
- Area code(s): 317, 463
- FIPS code: 18-54180
- GNIS feature ID: 2395240
- Website: www.noblesville.in.gov

Noblesville is a city in and the county seat of Hamilton County, Indiana, United States, a part of the north Indianapolis suburbs along the White River. The population was 69,604 at the 2020 census, making it the state's 10th most populous city, up from 14th in 2010. The city is part of Delaware, Fall Creek, Noblesville, and Wayne townships.

Noblesville is home to Ruoff Music Center (formerly Klipsch Music Center and Deer Creek Music Center), the Indianapolis metro area's primary outdoor music venue. Since its opening in 1989, the nearly 25,000-seat amphitheater has been a popular stop for many touring musicians, consistently ranking first (or in the top three) among outdoor music venues in the world, for ticket sales, according to Pollstar.

== History ==
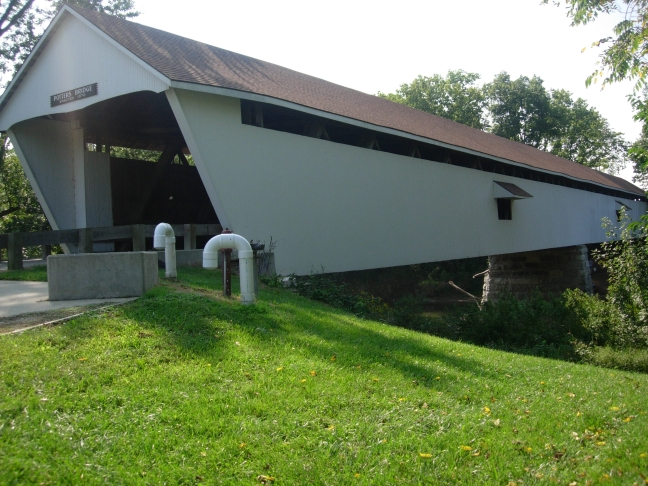
Potter's Covered Bridge

Noblesville's history dates to 1818 when the government purchased the land that is now Hamilton County from the Native Americans in this area. William Conner, the only settler living in the area at the time, and his wife Mekinges Conner, a Lenape woman, established the first trading post in central Indiana in 1802 and lived in the area's first log cabin. William Conner and Josiah Polk laid out what is now downtown Noblesville in 1823, which was designated as the Hamilton County seat in 1824 and incorporated in 1851. Conner's 1823 home is now one of a village of historic buildings that make up Conner Prairie Pioneer Settlement, a living history museum south of Noblesville in Fishers.

Noblesville was named either for James Noble, one of the first two U.S. senators from Indiana, or, according to legend, for Lavina Noble of Indianapolis, to whom Josiah Polk was engaged.

The Peru and Indianapolis Railroad was completed through town in 1851, strengthening the town economically and causing the population to increase. In 1875 work began on the town's second railroad, the Anderson, Lebanon and St. Louis, later known as the Midland.

The city's first large growth period occurred during the Indiana gas boom, with the discovery in 1888 of Noblesville's first natural gas well near 11th and Pleasant streets. Many Victorian homes, as well as most of the downtown commercial district, were built during this time of prosperity. The city has undergone another increase recently as its population grew from 28,590 in 2000 to 51,969 in 2010. This growth echoes the increase in population of much of southern Hamilton County due to its proximity to Indianapolis.

Noblesville was once noted for its flour mills, the mostly widely known of which was the Noblesville Milling Company, producer of Diadem and Kismet flours. In 1925, the manager of the company offered to buy uniforms for the local high school athletic team in exchange for the school adopting the nickname "Millers". The nickname persists to this day.

Other prominent businesses included the Union Sanitary Manufacturing Company, the American Strawboard Company and Firestone Industrial Products.

Among the notable disasters that have struck the town are the Great Flood of 1913, an interurban wreck on the courthouse square in 1919, and the Goeke fire of 1967. The fire, which began at the Paul Goeke auto dealership just off the square, destroyed two buildings and killed a firefighter'.

The old Hamilton County Sheriff's Residence and Jail on the southwest corner of the courthouse square in downtown Noblesville is now the home of the Hamilton County Museum of History. As a working jail, it once housed Charles Manson as a teenager and D. C. Stephenson, former Grand Dragon of the Indiana Ku Klux Klan. The Stephenson trial, which took place in the adjoining Hamilton County courthouse in 1925, broke the power of the Klan in Indiana and drew national attention to Noblesville. Stephenson was convicted of second-degree murder in the death of Madge Oberholtzer.

During the early 1920s, Noblesville was one of several Indiana towns where the Ku Klux Klan was active, but the Klan's influence quickly faded after Stephenson's conviction. In 1973 Klansmen staging a march in Noblesville were met by counter-demonstrators carrying anti-Klan placards.

In 1995, a local contractor stumbled across a trunk containing Klan paraphernalia and membership records from the 1920s. The debate over how to handle the sensitive issue again put Noblesville in the national spotlight. The Hamilton County Historical Society, which received donated materials, opted to keep the public from seeing the former members' names until 2020, when they donated the collection to the Indiana Historical Society for greater public access.

Noblesville also attracted national media attention in 1965 when Noblesville Daily Ledger editor James T. Neal was charged with contempt by Hamilton County Circuit Court judge Ed New. Neal's fight for the First Amendment went before the Indiana Supreme Court. In May 2018, it drew national attention again as the Noblesville West Middle School was the site of a school shooting with a teacher and student injured.

=== List of mayors ===
No.	Mayor	Term of office	Party
1	David Moss	1851	
2	Edgar C. Wilson	1887 – 1889	Republican
3	John F. Neal	1889 – 1890	Republican
4	James W. Smith	1891 – 1894	Republican
5	Edgar C. Wilson	1895 – 1899	Republican
6	Albert R. Baker	1900 – 1902	Republican
7	George Snyder	1903	Republican
8	John L. Dulin	1904 – 1906	Democratic
9	Edgar C. Wilson	1907 – 1909	Republican
10	Dr. E. C. Loehr	1910 – 1917	Republican
11	D. B. "Jack" McCoun	1918 – 1921	Republican
12	H. G. "Pop" Brown	1922 – 1925	Republican
13	J. X. Joseph	1926 – 1929	Republican
14	William E. Gifford	1930 – 1934	Republican
15	H. G. "Pop" Brown	1935 – 1938	Republican
16	Emmett R. Fertig	1939 – 1951	Republican
17	Herman Lawson	1952 – 1958	Republican
18	Gordon Olvey	1958	Republican
19	John R. Neal	1958 – 1959	Republican
19	Dale Hanshew	1960 – 1963	Republican
20	John R. Neal	1963	Republican
21	Joe Butler	1964 – 1971	Republican
22	Max Robinson	1972 – 1975	Republican
23	Robert V. Wical	1976 – 1979	Democratic
24	Patricia Logan	1980 – 1987	Republican
25	Mary Sue Rowland	1988 – 1995	Republican
26	Dennis R. Redick	1996 – 2003	Republican
27	John Ditslear	2004 – 2019	Republican
28	Chris Jensen	2020 – present	Republican

=== Current City Council ===
The Council consists of nine members (new as of January 1, 2016, when Noblesville became a Second Class City in Indiana). Three are elected across the city (at large) and six are elected specifically to certain areas of the city (districts). "Noblesville Common Council".

District	Council member
1st	Mike Davis
2nd	Todd Thurston
3rd	Aaron Smith
4th	Mark Boice
5th	David Johnson
6th	Megan Wiles (Vice President)
At-Large	Pete Schwartz
At-Large	Darren Peterson (President)
At-Large	Evan Elliott

== Architecture ==
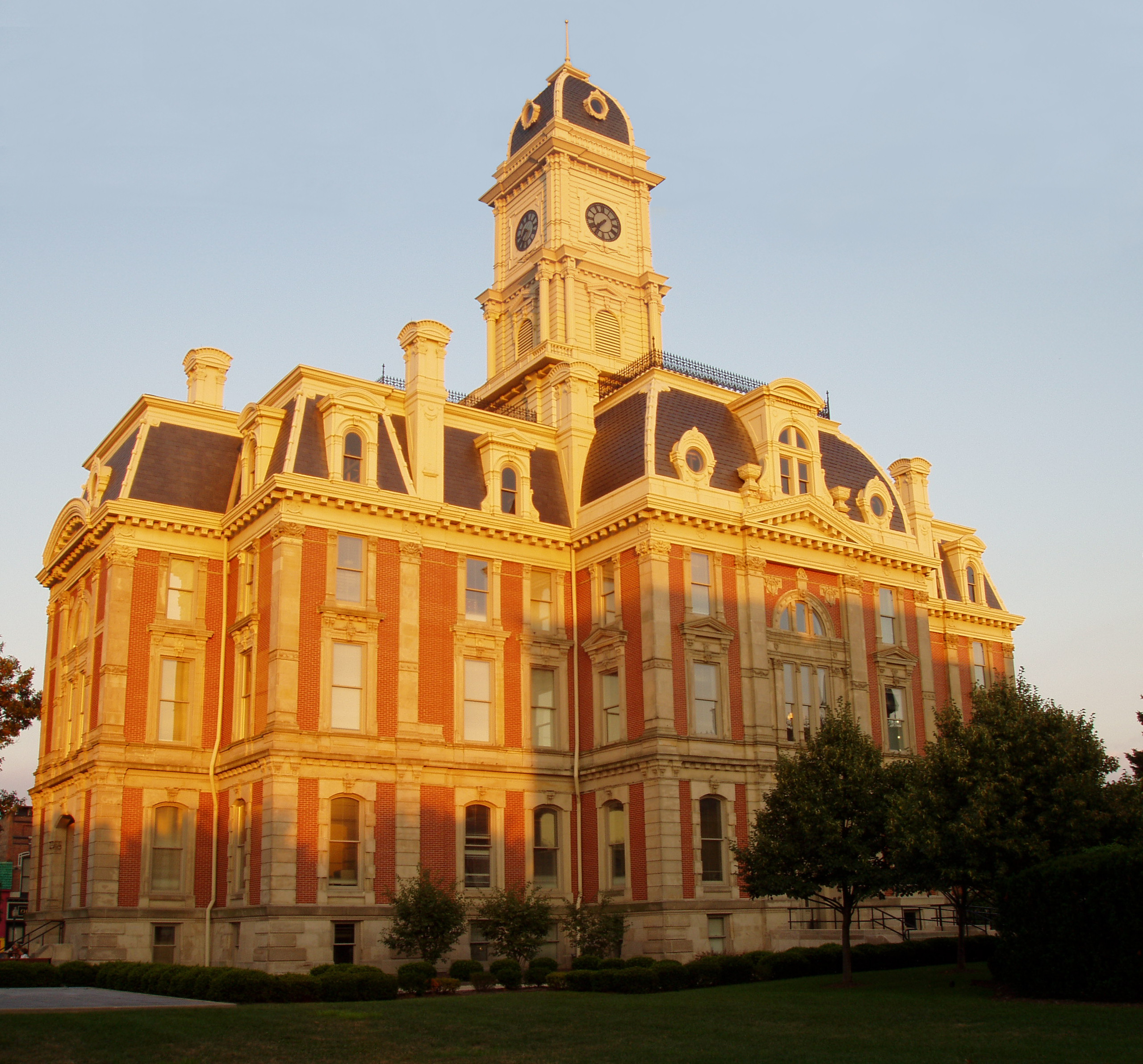
Hamilton County Courthouse

The centerpiece of downtown Noblesville is the Courthouse Square, the location of the Hamilton County Courthouse (completed in 1879) and the Hamilton County Sheriff's Residence and Jail (constructed in 1876). Both buildings are fabulous examples of the Second Empire style featuring mansard roofs. Sites and buildings in Noblesville that are listed on the National Register of Historic Places include the Hamilton County Courthouse Square, the Catherine Street Historic District, Cole-Evans House, Conner Street Historic District, William Houston Craig House, Daniel Craycraft House, Dr. Samuel Harrell House, Holliday Hydroelectric Powerhouse and Dam, Noblesville Commercial Historic District, Noblesville Milling Company Mill, South 9th Street Historic District, Judge Earl S. Stone House, and Robert L. Wilson House.

== Geography ==
Noblesville is located in central Hamilton County and is bordered to the north by Cicero, to the south by Fishers and Carmel, and to the west by Westfield. A narrow portion of Noblesville extends east to the Madison County line, where it is bordered by the town of Ingalls.

Noblesville is 23 miles (37 km) north-northeast of downtown Indianapolis. Indiana State Road 37 is the main highway through the city, running east of downtown. It leads south to Interstate 69 in Fishers and thence to Indianapolis, and northeast 43 miles (69 km) to Marion. Conner Street, carrying state routes 32 and 38, is the main east–west road through the center of Noblesville. SR 32 leads east-northeast 18 miles (29 km) to Anderson and west 6 miles (10 km) to Westfield, while SR 38 leads east-southeast 14 miles (23 km) to Pendleton and northwest 13 miles (21 km) to Sheridan. Indiana State Road 19 runs north from Noblesville, leading 17 miles (27 km) to Tipton.

According to the 2010 census, Noblesville has a total area of 32.785 square miles (84.91 km^{2}), of which 31.37 square miles (81.25 km^{2}) (or 95.68%) is land and 1.415 square miles (3.66 km^{2}) (or 4.32%) is water.

== Demographics ==
Historical population
Census	Pop.	Note	%±
1850	664		—
1860	1,115		67.9%
1870	1,435		28.7%
1880	2,221		54.8%
1890	3,054		37.5%
1900	4,792		56.9%
1910	5,073		5.9%
1920	4,758		−6.2%
1930	4,811		1.1%
1940	5,575		15.9%
1950	6,567		17.8%
1960	7,664		16.7%
1970	7,548		−1.5%
1980	12,056		59.7%
1990	17,655		46.4%
2000	28,590		61.9%
2010	51,969		81.8%
2020	69,604		33.9%
2025 (est.)	76,111		9.3%
Source: US Census Bureau

=== 2020 census ===
As of the 2020 census, Noblesville had a population of 69,604. The median age was 36.2 years. 27.5% of residents were under the age of 18 and 13.1% of residents were 65 years of age or older. For every 100 females there were 93.5 males, and for every 100 females age 18 and over there were 89.6 males age 18 and over.

99.7% of residents lived in urban areas, while 0.3% lived in rural areas.

There were 25,829 households in Noblesville, of which 39.4% had children under the age of 18 living in them. Of all households, 57.3% were married-couple households, 12.7% were households with a male householder and no spouse or partner present, and 23.8% were households with a female householder and no spouse or partner present. About 22.0% of all households were made up of individuals and 8.4% had someone living alone who was 65 years of age or older.

There were 27,101 housing units, of which 4.7% were vacant. The homeowner vacancy rate was 0.9% and the rental vacancy rate was 7.6%.

Racial composition as of the 2020 census
Race	Number	Percent
White	58,050	83.4%
Black or African American	3,194	4.6%
American Indian and Alaska Native	152	0.2%
Asian	1,796	2.6%
Native Hawaiian and Other Pacific Islander	40	0.1%
Some other race	1,615	2.3%
Two or more races	4,757	6.8%
Hispanic or Latino (of any race)	4,245	6.1%

=== 2010 census ===
As of the census of 2010, there were 51,969 people, 19,080 households, and 13,989 families residing in the city. The population density was 1,656.6 inhabitants per square mile (639.6/km^{2}). There were 21,121 housing units at an average density of 673.3 per square mile (260.0/km^{2}). The racial makeup of the city was 91.1% White, 3.6% African American, 0.2% Native American, 1.7% Asian, 0.1% Pacific Islander, 1.6% from other races, and 1.8% from two or more races. Hispanic or Latino of any race were 4.3% of the population.

There were 19,080 households, of which 42.9% had children under the age of 18 living with them, 58.3% were married couples living together, 10.8% had a female householder with no husband present, 4.2% had a male householder with no wife present, and 26.7% were non-families. 21.6% of all households were made up of individuals, and 6% had someone living alone who was 65 years of age or older. The average household size was 2.69 and the average family size was 3.15.

The median age in the city was 33 years. 30.2% of residents were under the age of 18; 6.5% were between the ages of 18 and 24; 33% were from 25 to 44; 21.6% were from 45 to 64; and 8.7% were 65 years of age or older. The gender makeup of the city was 48.4% male and 51.6% female.

=== 2000 census ===
As of 2000, the median income for a household in the city was $73,395, and the median per capita income was $33,732. Approximately 45.22% of the population has a higher education degree with over 87.3% of the population at least having a high school diploma or GED. The median housing value is $171,272 with a total of 17,915 housing units.

== Arts and culture ==
There are many recreational amenities in Noblesville, including seven public and private golf courses, the Belfry Theater, Downtown Noblesville shopping and historic sightseeing, the extensive public park system including Forest Park and Dr. James A. Dillon Park, the Hamilton County Artists' Association and its Birdie Gallery, Hamilton Town Center, Morse Park and Beach, Ruoff Music Center, and the White River Canoe Company. Annually, Noblesville hosts two outdoor festivals in the heart of downtown, the Indiana Peony Festival and the Front Porch Music Festival, drawing more than 40,000 visitors combined.

== Sports ==
The Noblesville Boom, the NBA G League affiliate team of the NBA's Indiana Pacers, play their home games at Riverview Health Arena at Innovation Mile. The $93 million arena was opened in August 2025 and began hosting Boom games in the fall of 2025.

USA Gymnastics, currently headquartered nearby in Indianapolis, has plans to build a new headquarters and training center in Noblesville by 2028.

== Education ==
Most of Noblesville is in the Noblesville Schools school district, while a portion is in Hamilton Southeastern Schools. Noblesville High School is the comprehensive high school of the former district. In the latter school district portions of Noblesville are served by two different comprehensive high schools: Fishers High School and Hamilton Southeastern High School. Noblesville is also home to St. Theodore Guerin High School.

The city has a lending library, the Hamilton East Public Library.

== Sister cities ==
Noblesville has two sister cities as designated by Sister Cities International.

- Cittadella, Veneto, Italy
- Nova Prata, Rio Grande do Sul, Brazil

== Notable people ==
- Lillian Albertson, actress and theatrical producer
- Tracy Anderson, author and multi-platform fitness/wellness entrepreneur
- Ian Baas, racing driver
- Scott Baldwin, businessman and politician
- Micah Beckwith, 53rd Lieutenant Governor of Indiana
- David Boudia, Olympic diver and gold medalist, 10-meter platform, 2012 London Olympics
- Wyatt Brichacek, racing driver
- Bryan Clauson, IndyCar, NASCAR, and USAC driver
- Kelly Crull, sports anchor and reporter for Fox Sports South
- Derek Daly, former Formula 1 and CART driver, previously a pundit on the now defunct Speed TV
- Conor Daly, son of Derek Daly, IndyCar, and NASCAR driver
- Ralph W. Gwinn, 20th-century US congressman
- Chris Hacker, NASCAR driver
- Scott Haffner, former NBA basketball player with the Charlotte Hornets and Miami Heat
- Clinton L. Hare, football head coach at Butler University and Purdue
- William J. Knight, astronaut and politician
- Timothy Kraft, retired political consultant; campaign manager in 1980 for U.S. President Jimmy Carter
- Norman Norell, fashion designer
- William Dudley Pelley, leader of Christian Party and fascist Silver Legion
- Drew Powell, actor
- Ashley Prange, professional golfer and winner of The Big Break
- Victoria Spartz, member of the U.S. House of Representatives
- Roger Stern, Superman comic book writer: Death of Superman
- Rex Stout, creator of popular Nero Wolfe detective series; born in Noblesville
- Michael Sylvester, opera singer
- Steve Wariner, country music singer and songwriter
- Billy Wease, racing driver
- Wes Whisler, former Major League Baseball pitcher
