= 1936 United States presidential election in Indiana =

- November 3, 1936
- Turnout: 78.7% ▼0.2 pp

Nominee	Franklin D. Roosevelt	Alf Landon
Party	Democratic	Republican
Home state	New York	Kansas
Running mate	John Nance Garner	Frank Knox
Electoral vote	14	0
Popular vote	934,974	691,570
Percentage	56.63%	41.89%
County results
Roosevelt
50–60%
60–70%
70–80%
Landon
40–50%
50–60%
President before election
Franklin D. Roosevelt
Democratic
Elected President
Franklin D. Roosevelt
Democratic

A presidential election was held in Indiana on November 3, 1936, as part of the 1936 United States presidential election. The Democratic ticket of the incumbent president of the United States Franklin D. Roosevelt and the vice president of the United States John Nance Garner defeated the Republican ticket of the governor of Kansas Alf Landon and the publisher of the Chicago Daily News Frank Knox. Roosevelt defeated Landon in the national election with 523 electoral votes.

This was the first presidential election held in Indiana in which the members of the Electoral College were elected as a block, rather than individually, following passage of a 1933 law. The legislation specified that the names of the national party nominees for president and vice president be listed on the ballot in place of the names of the candidates for electors; under the new system, a vote for a party's national ticket would count as a vote for the list of electors nominated by that party.

== General election ==
=== Statistics ===
As of 2024, this is the most recent presidential election in which the Democratic ticket carried Boone, Rush, Union and Wayne counties. It remains the only occasion since 1856 that the state has voted for the Democratic ticket in the second of two consecutive elections. Roosevelt was the last Democratic presidential candidate to carry Indiana until 1964, when the state voted for the incumbent president Lyndon Johnson over his Republican challenger Barry Goldwater.

=== Results ===
1936 United States presidential election in Indiana
Party	Candidate	Votes	%	±%
Democratic	Franklin D. Roosevelt John Nance Garner	934,974	56.63	▲1.96
Republican	Alf Landon Frank Knox	691,570	41.89	▼1.05
Union	William Lemke Thomas C. O'Brien	19,407	1.18	▲1.18
Socialist	Norman Thomas George A. Nelson	3,856	0.23	▼1.13
Communist	Earl Browder James W. Ford	1,090	0.07	▼0.07
Total votes		1,650,897	100.00	

=== Results by county ===
1936 United States presidential election in Indiana by county
County	Franklin D. Roosevelt Democratic		Alf Landon Republican		William Lemke Union		Norman Thomas Socialist		Earl Browder Communist		Margin		Total
County	Votes	%	Votes	%	Votes	%	Votes	%	Votes	%	Votes	%	Total
Adams	5,822	63.23%	3,249	35.28%	119	1.29%	15	0.16%	3	0.03%	2,573	27.94%	9,208
Allen	39,151	59.19%	24,765	37.44%	2,056	3.11%	136	0.21%	38	0.06%	14,386	21.75%	66,146
Bartholomew	8,536	56.50%	6,484	42.92%	50	0.33%	34	0.23%	3	0.02%	2,052	13.58%	15,107
Benton	3,211	50.72%	2,989	47.21%	125	1.97%	6	0.09%	0	0.00%	222	3.51%	6,331
Blackford	4,217	59.02%	2,845	39.82%	68	0.95%	15	0.21%	0	0.00%	1,372	19.20%	7,145
Boone	6,775	53.80%	5,739	45.57%	65	0.52%	13	0.10%	1	0.01%	1,036	8.23%	12,593
Brown	1,585	55.73%	1,244	43.74%	8	0.28%	5	0.18%	2	0.07%	341	11.99%	2,844
Carroll	4,676	51.01%	4,426	48.28%	60	0.65%	1	0.01%	4	0.04%	250	2.73%	9,167
Cass	10,475	53.93%	8,528	43.91%	384	1.98%	31	0.16%	4	0.02%	1,947	10.02%	19,422
Clark	10,116	63.64%	5,536	34.83%	213	1.34%	29	0.18%	2	0.01%	4,580	28.81%	15,896
Clay	8,235	56.09%	6,335	43.15%	51	0.35%	54	0.37%	8	0.05%	1,900	12.94%	14,683
Clinton	8,340	53.02%	7,265	46.19%	92	0.58%	22	0.14%	11	0.07%	1,075	6.83%	15,730
Crawford	2,919	52.89%	2,589	46.91%	5	0.09%	5	0.09%	1	0.02%	330	5.98%	5,519
Daviess	6,848	50.84%	6,459	47.95%	123	0.91%	37	0.27%	3	0.02%	389	2.89%	13,470
Dearborn	6,366	56.56%	4,669	41.48%	193	1.71%	25	0.22%	3	0.03%	1,697	15.08%	11,256
Decatur	4,887	48.35%	5,126	50.72%	76	0.75%	15	0.15%	3	0.03%	-239	-2.36%	10,107
DeKalb	6,970	53.50%	5,848	44.89%	182	1.40%	25	0.19%	2	0.02%	1,122	8.61%	13,027
Delaware	19,048	56.81%	14,207	42.37%	187	0.56%	69	0.21%	16	0.05%	4,841	14.44%	33,527
Dubois	6,927	66.87%	3,011	29.07%	393	3.79%	27	0.26%	1	0.01%	3,916	37.80%	10,359
Elkhart	14,473	47.65%	14,896	49.05%	875	2.88%	100	0.33%	27	0.09%	-423	-1.39%	30,371
Fayette	5,756	52.70%	5,067	46.39%	75	0.69%	21	0.19%	3	0.03%	689	6.31%	10,922
Floyd	10,654	58.79%	6,976	38.50%	425	2.35%	63	0.35%	3	0.02%	3,678	20.30%	18,121
Fountain	5,617	54.45%	4,663	45.20%	26	0.25%	9	0.09%	1	0.01%	954	9.25%	10,316
Franklin	3,891	54.31%	2,952	41.21%	311	4.34%	9	0.13%	1	0.01%	939	13.11%	7,164
Fulton	4,322	48.00%	4,541	50.43%	125	1.39%	13	0.14%	3	0.03%	-219	-2.43%	9,004
Gibson	9,392	56.21%	7,078	42.36%	172	1.03%	43	0.26%	25	0.15%	2,314	13.85%	16,710
Grant	13,655	52.00%	11,774	44.84%	722	2.75%	87	0.33%	22	0.08%	1,881	7.16%	26,260
Greene	9,730	56.10%	7,460	43.01%	50	0.29%	73	0.42%	31	0.18%	2,270	13.09%	17,344
Hamilton	5,396	41.93%	7,323	56.90%	139	1.08%	12	0.09%	0	0.00%	-1,927	-14.97%	12,870
Hancock	5,962	58.57%	4,174	41.00%	33	0.32%	11	0.11%	0	0.00%	1,788	17.56%	10,180
Harrison	5,025	55.92%	3,885	43.23%	64	0.71%	10	0.11%	2	0.02%	1,140	12.69%	8,986
Hendricks	5,237	47.19%	5,776	52.05%	63	0.57%	20	0.18%	1	0.01%	-539	-4.86%	11,097
Henry	10,172	52.38%	9,099	46.85%	99	0.51%	44	0.23%	6	0.03%	1,073	5.53%	19,420
Howard	12,288	54.99%	9,534	42.67%	425	1.90%	86	0.38%	13	0.06%	2,754	12.32%	22,346
Huntington	8,361	53.26%	7,024	44.75%	275	1.75%	34	0.22%	3	0.02%	1,337	8.52%	15,697
Jackson	8,018	61.50%	4,951	37.98%	34	0.26%	33	0.25%	1	0.01%	3,067	23.53%	13,037
Jasper	3,109	46.26%	3,540	52.67%	59	0.88%	10	0.15%	3	0.04%	-431	-6.41%	6,721
Jay	6,535	54.61%	5,233	43.73%	178	1.49%	18	0.15%	3	0.03%	1,302	10.88%	11,967
Jefferson	4,805	47.08%	5,320	52.12%	69	0.68%	12	0.12%	1	0.01%	-515	-5.05%	10,207
Jennings	3,157	46.27%	3,594	52.67%	63	0.92%	6	0.09%	3	0.04%	-437	-6.40%	6,823
Johnson	6,934	56.24%	5,315	43.11%	66	0.54%	13	0.11%	1	0.01%	1,619	13.13%	12,329
Knox	13,669	61.02%	8,589	38.34%	53	0.24%	62	0.28%	27	0.12%	5,080	22.68%	22,400
Kosciusko	6,890	45.39%	8,182	53.90%	94	0.62%	11	0.07%	2	0.01%	-1,292	-8.51%	15,179
LaGrange	2,821	46.69%	3,125	51.72%	85	1.41%	9	0.15%	2	0.03%	-304	-5.03%	6,042
Lake	68,551	66.07%	33,689	32.47%	1,064	1.03%	244	0.24%	202	0.19%	34,862	33.60%	103,750
LaPorte	15,359	56.07%	11,722	42.79%	238	0.87%	63	0.23%	10	0.04%	3,637	13.28%	27,392
Lawrence	8,062	44.35%	9,982	54.91%	111	0.61%	22	0.12%	1	0.01%	-1,920	-10.56%	18,178
Madison	27,347	61.46%	16,644	37.41%	391	0.88%	88	0.20%	25	0.06%	10,703	24.05%	44,495
Marion	124,961	57.71%	87,798	40.54%	2,953	1.36%	669	0.31%	169	0.08%	37,163	17.16%	216,550
Marshall	6,651	51.28%	6,118	47.17%	182	1.40%	19	0.15%	1	0.01%	533	4.11%	12,971
Martin	2,923	52.70%	2,583	46.57%	32	0.58%	7	0.13%	1	0.02%	340	6.13%	5,546
Miami	8,173	54.05%	6,747	44.62%	133	0.88%	61	0.40%	8	0.05%	1,426	9.43%	15,122
Monroe	9,220	50.91%	8,842	48.82%	24	0.13%	19	0.10%	5	0.03%	378	2.09%	18,110
Montgomery	8,053	51.79%	7,369	47.39%	59	0.38%	59	0.38%	9	0.06%	684	4.40%	15,549
Morgan	5,451	48.12%	5,793	51.14%	63	0.56%	18	0.16%	3	0.03%	-342	-3.02%	11,328
Newton	2,430	44.93%	2,937	54.31%	18	0.33%	21	0.39%	2	0.04%	-507	-9.37%	5,408
Noble	5,990	50.18%	5,760	48.26%	165	1.38%	16	0.13%	5	0.04%	230	1.93%	11,936
Ohio	1,362	57.13%	1,022	42.87%	0	0.00%	0	0.00%	0	0.00%	340	14.26%	2,384
Orange	4,549	46.94%	5,106	52.68%	31	0.32%	6	0.06%	0	0.00%	-557	-5.75%	9,692
Owen	3,498	52.62%	3,091	46.50%	40	0.60%	15	0.23%	4	0.06%	407	6.12%	6,648
Parke	4,811	50.42%	4,665	48.89%	21	0.22%	37	0.39%	8	0.08%	146	1.53%	9,542
Perry	4,752	55.13%	3,619	41.99%	228	2.65%	19	0.22%	1	0.01%	1,133	13.15%	8,619
Pike	4,952	55.75%	3,885	43.74%	31	0.35%	13	0.15%	1	0.01%	1,067	12.01%	8,882
Porter	5,560	46.58%	6,278	52.60%	68	0.57%	28	0.23%	2	0.02%	-718	-6.02%	11,936
Posey	5,630	63.34%	3,088	34.74%	152	1.71%	12	0.14%	6	0.07%	2,542	28.60%	8,888
Pulaski	3,274	53.50%	2,780	45.42%	31	0.51%	35	0.57%	0	0.00%	494	8.07%	6,120
Putnam	6,177	55.12%	4,961	44.27%	24	0.21%	41	0.37%	4	0.04%	1,216	10.85%	11,207
Randolph	6,487	48.84%	6,682	50.30%	91	0.69%	20	0.15%	3	0.02%	-195	-1.47%	13,283
Ripley	5,546	51.84%	4,919	45.98%	205	1.92%	24	0.22%	4	0.04%	627	5.86%	10,698
Rush	5,999	52.17%	5,457	47.45%	34	0.30%	8	0.07%	2	0.02%	542	4.71%	11,500
St. Joseph	43,131	61.32%	25,807	36.69%	1,135	1.61%	4	0.08%	2	0.04%	17,324	24.63%	70,339
Scott	2,696	56.81%	2,034	42.86%	10	0.21%	14	0.10%	1	0.01%	662	13.95%	4,746
Shelby	8,552	58.11%	6,026	40.95%	124	0.84%	15	0.16%	4	0.04%	2,526	17.16%	14,717
Spencer	4,966	51.32%	4,567	47.20%	124	1.28%	154	0.22%	112	0.16%	399	4.12%	9,676
Starke	3,143	52.11%	2,846	47.18%	23	0.38%	14	0.23%	6	0.10%	297	4.92%	6,032
Steuben	3,402	45.09%	3,998	52.99%	133	1.76%	11	0.15%	1	0.01%	-596	-7.90%	7,545
Sullivan	10,203	67.33%	4,685	30.92%	79	0.52%	161	1.06%	26	0.17%	5,518	36.41%	15,154
Switzerland	2,840	56.06%	2,212	43.66%	8	0.16%	6	0.12%	0	0.00%	628	12.40%	5,066
Tippecanoe	12,732	48.74%	13,081	50.08%	249	0.95%	54	0.21%	6	0.02%	-349	-1.34%	26,122
Tipton	4,796	54.88%	3,842	43.96%	88	1.01%	12	0.14%	1	0.01%	954	10.92%	8,739
Union	1,662	50.17%	1,630	49.20%	21	0.63%	0	0.00%	0	0.00%	32	0.97%	3,313
Vanderburgh	41,490	72.68%	14,725	25.79%	655	1.15%	174	0.30%	41	0.07%	26,765	46.89%	57,085
Vermillion	7,188	61.78%	4,320	37.13%	56	0.48%	42	0.36%	29	0.25%	2,868	24.65%	11,635
Vigo	33,018	65.08%	17,278	34.05%	239	0.47%	139	0.27%	64	0.13%	15,740	31.02%	50,738
Wabash	6,200	45.51%	7,223	53.02%	171	1.26%	20	0.15%	9	0.07%	-1,023	-7.51%	13,623
Warren	2,242	44.44%	2,780	55.10%	13	0.26%	9	0.18%	1	0.02%	-538	-10.66%	5,045
Warrick	5,343	56.67%	3,968	42.08%	107	1.13%	10	0.11%	1	0.01%	1,375	14.58%	9,429
Washington	4,766	56.19%	3,690	43.50%	22	0.26%	3	0.04%	1	0.01%	1,076	12.69%	8,482
Wayne	13,696	51.93%	12,126	45.98%	489	1.85%	45	0.17%	17	0.06%	1,570	5.95%	26,373
Wells	6,189	62.81%	3,606	36.59%	48	0.49%	9	0.09%	2	0.02%	2,583	26.21%	9,854
White	4,863	52.57%	4,245	45.89%	132	1.43%	10	0.11%	0	0.00%	618	6.68%	9,250
Whitley	5,115	55.90%	3,959	43.27%	62	0.68%	13	0.14%	1	0.01%	1,156	12.63%	9,150
TOTAL	934,974	56.63%	691,570	41.89%	19,407	1.18%	3,856	0.23%	1,090	0.07%	243,404	14.74%	1,650,897

==== Counties that flipped from Democratic to Republican ====
- Decatur
- Elkhart
- Fulton
- Jasper
- Jefferson
- Jennings
- Kosciusko
- LaGrange
- Morgan
- Newton
- Orange
- Steuben
- Tippecanoe
- Warren

==== Counties that flipped from Republican to Democratic ====
- Delaware
- Henry
- Rush
- Union

== See also ==
- United States presidential elections in Indiana

== Bibliography ==
- Indiana (1937). Year Book of the State of Indiana for the Year 1936. Fort Wayne: Division of Accounting and Statistics.
- Madison, James H. (1986). The Indiana Way: A State History. Bloomington: Indiana University Press.
- Petersen, Svend (1963). A Statistical History of the American Presidential Elections. New York: Frederick Ungar Publishing Company. LCCN 62-21786.
- Spencer, William W.; Gause, Fred C., eds. (1936). Election Laws of Indiana and 1936 Political Calendar. Fort Wayne: State Board of Election Commissioners.
- Sullivan, Robert David (June 29, 2016). "How the Red and Blue Map Evolved over the Past Century". America.
