= White River Township, Hamilton County, Indiana =

White River Township
- Township
- Location in Hamilton County
- Coordinates: 40°09′21″N 85°55′49″W
- Country: United States
- State: Indiana
- County: Hamilton
- Organized: 1823

Government
  - Type: Indiana township
  - Trustee: Jamie Rulon

Area
  - Total: 56.07 sq mi (145.2 km^{2})
  - Land: 55.6 sq mi (144 km^{2})
  - Water: 0.46 sq mi (1.2 km^{2}) 0.82%
- Elevation: 817 ft (249 m)

Population (2020)
  - Total: 2,414
  - Density: 44.7/sq mi (17.3/km^{2})
- Time zone: UTC-5 (EST)
  - Summer (DST): UTC-4 (EDT)
- Area code(s): 765, 317, 463
- GNIS feature ID: 0454054
- Website: whiterivertwp.org

White River Township is one of nine townships in Hamilton County, Indiana, United States. As of the 2020 census, its population was 2,414. It is the least developed township in the county and the only one without an incorporated community of any kind within its boundaries.

== History ==
White River Township was organized in 1823. It is the oldest township in Hamilton County.

== Geography ==
According to the 2010 census, the township has a total area of 56.07 square miles (145.2 km^{2}), of which 55.6 square miles (144 km^{2}) (or 99.16%) is land and 0.46 square miles (1.2 km^{2}) (or 0.82%) is water. The streams of Bear Creek, Deer Creek, Duck Creek, Dyers Creek, Lamberson Ditch, Lock Ditch, Long Branch, Rogers Ditch, Sugar Run, and Weasel Creek run through this township.

=== Unincorporated communities ===
- Aroma
- Omega
- Strawtown
- Walnut Grove

(This list is based on USGS data and may include former settlements.)

=== Adjacent townships ===
- Madison Township, Tipton County (north)
- Pipe Creek Township, Madison County (northeast)
- Jackson Township, Madison County (east)
- Stony Creek Township, Madison County (southeast)
- Wayne Township (south)
- Noblesville Township (southwest)
- Jackson Township (west)
- Cicero Township, Tipton County (northwest)

=== Cemeteries ===
The township contains seven cemeteries: Buscher, Carey, Grubbs, Little Carey, Aroma Methodist, Newland, and Bethlehem (Cicero).

=== Major highways ===
- Indiana State Road 13
- Indiana State Road 37
- Indiana State Road 213
