= 1920 United States presidential election in Indiana =

- November 2, 1920
- Turnout: 71.0% ▼10.8 pp
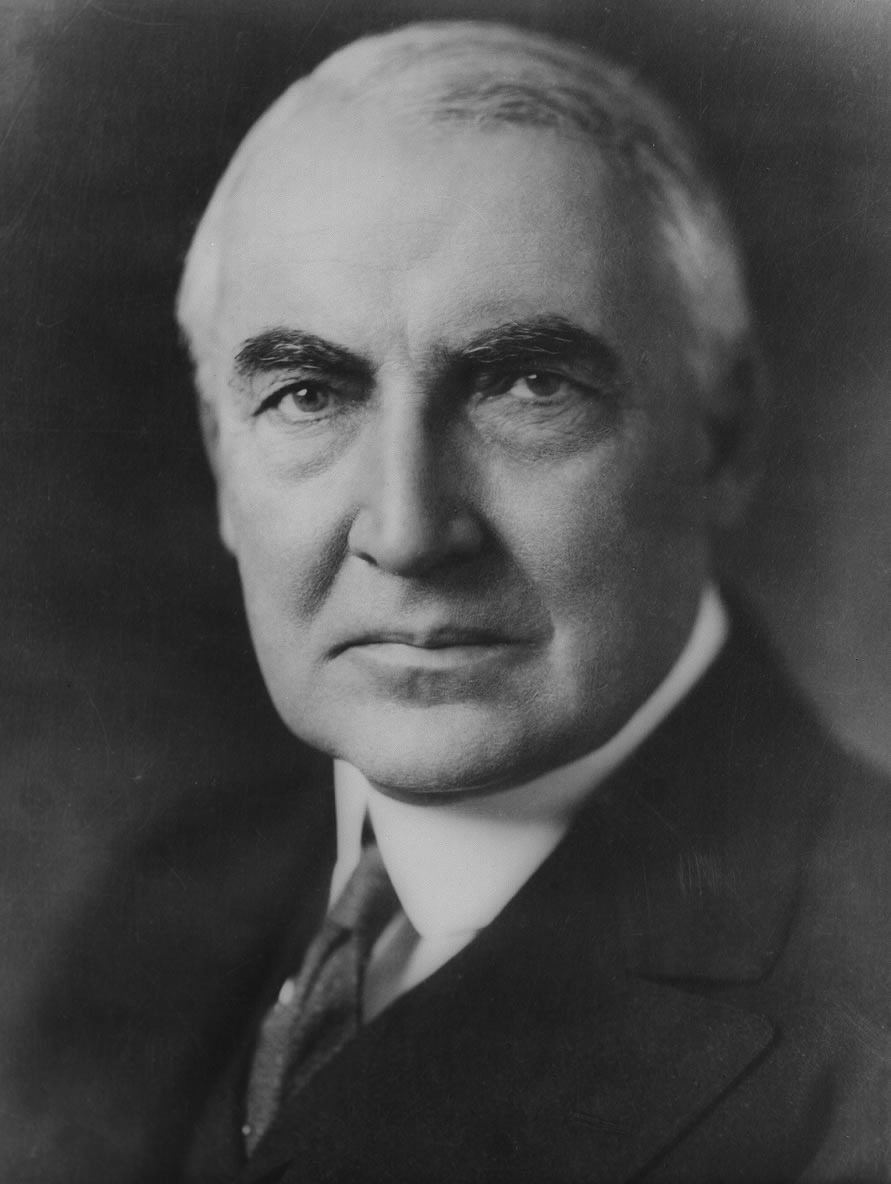

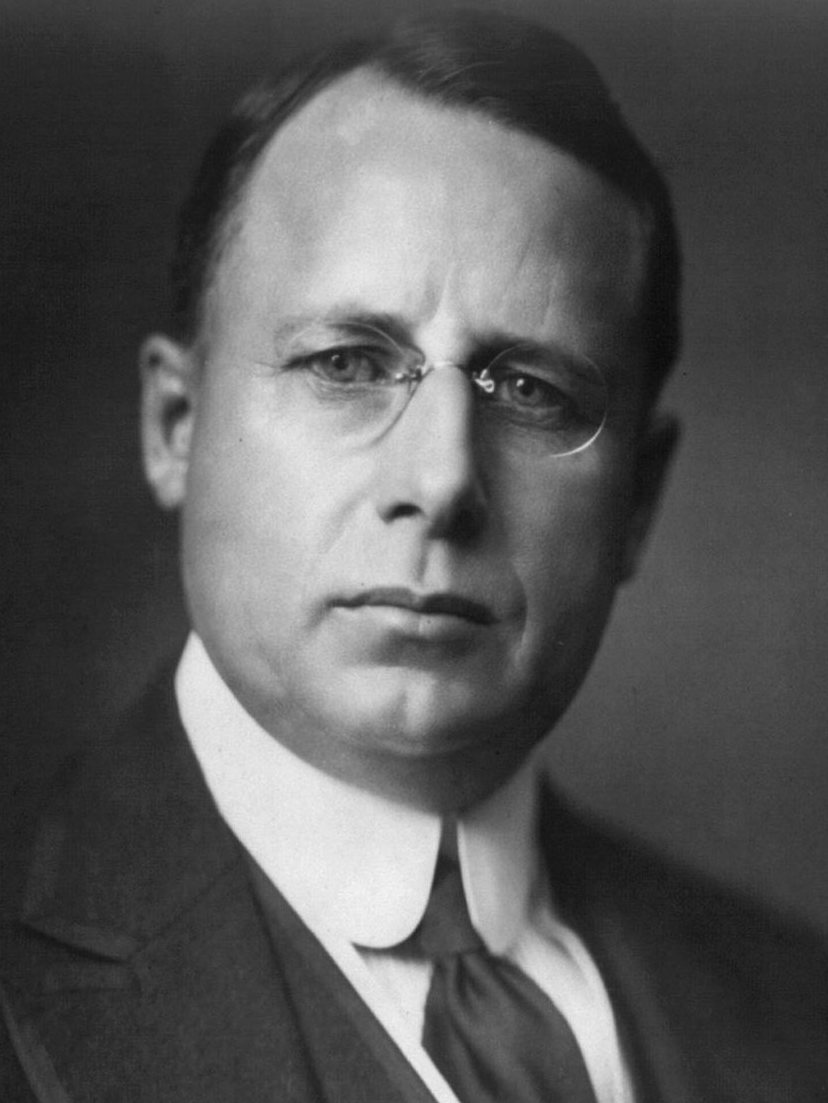
| Nominee | Warren G. Harding | James M. Cox |
| Party | Republican | Democratic |
| Home state | Ohio | Ohio |
| Running mate | Calvin Coolidge | Franklin D. Roosevelt |
| Electoral vote | 15 | 0 |
| Popular vote | 696,370 | 511,364 |
| Percentage | 55.14% | 40.49% |
County results
Harding
40–50%
50–60%
60–70%
70–80%
Cox
40–50%
50–60%
60–70%
President before election
Woodrow Wilson
Democratic
Elected President
Warren G. Harding
Republican

A presidential election was held in Indiana on November 2, 1920, as part of the 1920 United States presidential election. The Republican ticket of the junior U.S. senator from Ohio Warren G. Harding and the governor of Massachusetts Calvin Coolidge defeated the Democratic ticket of the governor of Ohio James M. Cox and the assistant secretary of the Navy Franklin D. Roosevelt. Harding defeated Cox in the national election with 404 electoral votes.

== Background ==
Partisan coalitions in Indiana at the turn of the century reflected the regional, ethnic, and religious roots of the settler population, with the descendants of White Southerners, German Americans, and Irish Americans (especially Catholics) voting reliably Democratic, while Yankees, Nordic and Scandinavian Americans, and British Americans favored the Republican Party. Southern Indiana leaned Democratic and Northern Indiana leaned Republican, in line with the loose correlation between ethnicity and geography. The state's notable concentration of German Catholics contributed to its closeness in presidential elections during the Third Party System relative to other Lower North states. William Jennings Bryan's 1896 presidential campaign saw the state move more securely into the Republican column, as German Catholics alienated by Bryan's outspoken Evangelicalism, conservatives unnerved by the candidate's agrarian radicalism, and urban workers frightened by threats of mass layoffs in the event of a Bryan victory voted Republican for the first time. Following this political realignment, Woodrow Wilson became the only Democrat to carry Indiana during the Fourth Party System (1896–1932) in 1912. Republican support remained greater in urban areas than in rural areas based on the strength of Republican urban political machines.

== Primary elections ==
=== Republican Party ===
Indiana Republican primary, May 4, 1920
| Party | Candidate | Votes | % |
|---|---|---|---|
| Republican | Leonard Wood | 85,708 | 37.93 |
| Republican | Hiram Johnson | 79,840 | 35.33 |
| Republican | Frank O. Lowden | 39,627 | 17.54 |
| Republican | Warren G. Harding | 20,782 | 9.20 |
| Total votes | | 225,957 | 100.00 |

=== Democratic Party ===
No candidates filed to run in the Indiana Democratic primary, and consequently no primary election was held.

== General election ==
=== Results ===
Indiana chose 15 electors on a statewide general ticket. Prevailing election laws required voters to elect each member of the Electoral College individually, rather than as a group. This sometimes resulted in small differences in the number of votes cast for electors pledged to the same presidential candidate, if some voters did not vote for all the electors nominated by a party. The following table quotes the official returns published by the secretary of state of Indiana, which list the votes for the first elector on each ticket.

1920 United States presidential election in Indiana
| Party | Candidate | Votes | % | ±% |
|---|---|---|---|---|
| Republican | Warren G. Harding Calvin Coolidge | 696,370 | 55.14 | ▲7.71 |
| Democratic | James M. Cox Franklin D. Roosevelt | 511,364 | 40.49 | ▼6.00 |
| Socialist | Eugene V. Debs Seymour Stedman | 24,703 | 1.96 | ▼1.08 |
| Farmer–Labor | Parley P. Christensen Max S. Hayes | 16,499 | 1.31 | ▲1.31 |
| Prohibition | Aaron S. Watkins D. Leigh Colvin | 13,462 | 1.07 | ▼1.21 |
| Single Tax | Robert C. MacAuley Richard C. Barnum | 566 | 0.04 | ▲0.04 |
| Total votes | | 1,262,964 | 100.00 | |

=== Results by county ===
1920 United States presidential election in Indiana by county
| County | Warren G. Harding Republican | | James M. Cox Democratic | | Eugene V. Debs Socialist | | Parley P. Christensen Farmer–Labor | | Aaron S. Watkins Prohibition | | Robert C. Macauley Single Tax | | Margin | | Total |
| County | Votes | % | Votes | % | Votes | % | Votes | % | Votes | % | Votes | % | Votes | % | Total |
|---|---|---|---|---|---|---|---|---|---|---|---|---|---|---|---|
| Adams | 4,144 | 51.81% | 3,653 | 45.67% | 21 | 0.26% | 48 | 0.60% | 131 | 1.64% | 1 | 0.01% | 491 | 6.14% | 7,998 |
| Allen | 24,208 | 57.40% | 13,804 | 32.73% | 497 | 1.18% | 3,344 | 7.93% | 268 | 0.64% | 56 | 0.13% | 10,404 | 24.67% | 42,177 |
| Bartholomew | 6,585 | 53.93% | 5,420 | 44.39% | 85 | 0.70% | 4 | 0.03% | 113 | 0.93% | 3 | 0.02% | 1,165 | 9.54% | 12,210 |
| Benton | 3,900 | 64.13% | 2,098 | 34.50% | 13 | 0.21% | 11 | 0.18% | 59 | 0.97% | 0 | 0.00% | 1,802 | 29.63% | 6,081 |
| Blackford | 3,145 | 51.79% | 2,555 | 42.07% | 224 | 3.69% | 15 | 0.25% | 129 | 2.12% | 5 | 0.08% | 590 | 9.72% | 6,073 |
| Boone | 6,650 | 50.93% | 6,178 | 47.31% | 64 | 0.49% | 1 | 0.01% | 163 | 1.25% | 2 | 0.02% | 472 | 3.61% | 13,058 |
| Brown | 788 | 36.75% | 1,316 | 61.38% | 16 | 0.75% | 0 | 0.00% | 24 | 1.12% | 0 | 0.00% | -528 | -24.63% | 2,144 |
| Carroll | 5,006 | 53.92% | 4,186 | 45.09% | 30 | 0.32% | 4 | 0.04% | 58 | 0.62% | 0 | 0.00% | 820 | 8.83% | 9,284 |
| Cass | 9,545 | 52.12% | 8,194 | 44.74% | 190 | 1.04% | 161 | 0.88% | 221 | 1.21% | 3 | 0.02% | 1,351 | 7.38% | 18,314 |
| Clark | 6,466 | 48.41% | 6,729 | 50.38% | 72 | 0.54% | 54 | 0.40% | 36 | 0.27% | 0 | 0.00% | -263 | -1.97% | 13,357 |
| Clay | 6,129 | 48.20% | 5,612 | 44.13% | 393 | 3.09% | 456 | 3.59% | 111 | 0.87% | 15 | 0.12% | 517 | 4.07% | 12,716 |
| Clinton | 7,739 | 52.59% | 6,721 | 45.67% | 93 | 0.63% | 6 | 0.04% | 156 | 1.06% | 2 | 0.01% | 1,018 | 6.92% | 14,717 |
| Crawford | 2,290 | 49.05% | 2,213 | 47.40% | 94 | 2.01% | 2 | 0.04% | 70 | 1.50% | 0 | 0.00% | 77 | 1.65% | 4,669 |
| Daviess | 6,748 | 53.42% | 5,587 | 44.23% | 201 | 1.59% | 36 | 0.28% | 59 | 0.47% | 2 | 0.02% | 1,161 | 9.19% | 12,633 |
| Dearborn | 5,159 | 50.66% | 4,884 | 47.96% | 66 | 0.65% | 11 | 0.11% | 63 | 0.62% | 0 | 0.00% | 275 | 2.70% | 10,183 |
| Decatur | 5,516 | 57.66% | 3,896 | 40.73% | 48 | 0.50% | 0 | 0.00% | 106 | 1.11% | 0 | 0.00% | 1,620 | 16.93% | 9,566 |
| DeKalb | 6,514 | 56.35% | 4,750 | 41.09% | 101 | 0.87% | 33 | 0.29% | 162 | 1.40% | 0 | 0.00% | 1,764 | 15.26% | 11,560 |
| Delaware | 14,845 | 61.78% | 8,329 | 34.66% | 480 | 2.00% | 40 | 0.17% | 327 | 1.36% | 9 | 0.04% | 6,516 | 27.12% | 24,030 |
| Dubois | 3,738 | 46.18% | 4,238 | 52.35% | 80 | 0.99% | 10 | 0.12% | 29 | 0.36% | 0 | 0.00% | -500 | -6.18% | 8,095 |
| Elkhart | 12,297 | 60.10% | 5,770 | 28.20% | 909 | 4.44% | 929 | 4.54% | 516 | 2.52% | 40 | 0.20% | 6,527 | 31.90% | 20,461 |
| Fayette | 4,742 | 54.27% | 3,768 | 43.12% | 48 | 0.55% | 108 | 1.24% | 70 | 0.80% | 2 | 0.02% | 974 | 11.15% | 8,738 |
| Floyd | 7,669 | 49.65% | 7,391 | 47.85% | 156 | 1.01% | 112 | 0.73% | 117 | 0.76% | 2 | 0.01% | 278 | 1.80% | 15,447 |
| Fountain | 5,218 | 54.09% | 4,088 | 42.38% | 267 | 2.77% | 8 | 0.08% | 64 | 0.66% | 2 | 0.02% | 1,130 | 11.71% | 9,647 |
| Franklin | 3,137 | 45.51% | 3,671 | 53.26% | 10 | 0.15% | 16 | 0.23% | 58 | 0.84% | 1 | 0.01% | -534 | -7.75% | 6,893 |
| Fulton | 4,618 | 53.99% | 3,602 | 42.11% | 229 | 2.68% | 11 | 0.13% | 92 | 1.08% | 2 | 0.02% | 1,016 | 11.88% | 8,554 |
| Gibson | 7,498 | 51.32% | 6,384 | 43.70% | 225 | 1.54% | 253 | 1.73% | 241 | 1.65% | 9 | 0.06% | 1,114 | 7.62% | 14,610 |
| Grant | 12,349 | 55.12% | 7,900 | 35.26% | 1,321 | 5.90% | 17 | 0.08% | 800 | 3.57% | 18 | 0.08% | 4,449 | 19.86% | 22,405 |
| Greene | 7,486 | 48.65% | 6,335 | 41.17% | 1,209 | 7.86% | 239 | 1.55% | 119 | 0.77% | 0 | 0.00% | 1,151 | 7.48% | 15,388 |
| Hamilton | 7,897 | 63.04% | 4,280 | 34.17% | 39 | 0.31% | 28 | 0.22% | 282 | 2.25% | 1 | 0.01% | 3,617 | 28.87% | 12,527 |
| Hancock | 4,422 | 46.16% | 4,958 | 51.76% | 53 | 0.55% | 4 | 0.04% | 141 | 1.47% | 1 | 0.01% | -536 | -5.60% | 9,579 |
| Harrison | 4,271 | 51.45% | 3,898 | 46.96% | 52 | 0.63% | 8 | 0.10% | 72 | 0.87% | 0 | 0.00% | 373 | 4.49% | 8,301 |
| Hendricks | 6,293 | 59.20% | 4,192 | 39.44% | 45 | 0.42% | 4 | 0.04% | 95 | 0.89% | 1 | 0.01% | 2,101 | 19.76% | 10,630 |
| Henry | 8,742 | 57.03% | 5,824 | 38.00% | 335 | 2.19% | 13 | 0.08% | 412 | 2.69% | 2 | 0.01% | 2,918 | 19.04% | 15,328 |
| Howard | 10,379 | 58.54% | 5,767 | 32.53% | 1,132 | 6.38% | 104 | 0.59% | 332 | 1.87% | 16 | 0.09% | 4,612 | 26.01% | 17,730 |
| Huntington | 8,100 | 53.67% | 6,506 | 43.11% | 136 | 0.90% | 73 | 0.48% | 275 | 1.82% | 3 | 0.02% | 1,594 | 10.56% | 15,093 |
| Jackson | 5,069 | 48.04% | 5,319 | 50.41% | 55 | 0.52% | 3 | 0.03% | 105 | 1.00% | 1 | 0.01% | -250 | -2.37% | 10,552 |
| Jasper | 3,942 | 66.87% | 1,872 | 31.76% | 14 | 0.24% | 11 | 0.19% | 56 | 0.95% | 0 | 0.00% | 2,070 | 35.11% | 5,895 |
| Jay | 6,089 | 53.35% | 4,759 | 41.69% | 80 | 0.70% | 119 | 1.04% | 367 | 3.22% | 0 | 0.00% | 1,330 | 11.65% | 11,414 |
| Jefferson | 5,732 | 58.02% | 4,000 | 40.49% | 45 | 0.46% | 10 | 0.10% | 93 | 0.94% | 0 | 0.00% | 1,732 | 17.53% | 9,880 |
| Jennings | 3,404 | 55.65% | 2,603 | 42.55% | 30 | 0.49% | 9 | 0.15% | 70 | 1.14% | 1 | 0.02% | 801 | 13.09% | 6,117 |
| Johnson | 4,863 | 45.36% | 5,452 | 50.85% | 324 | 3.02% | 4 | 0.04% | 77 | 0.72% | 2 | 0.02% | -589 | -5.49% | 10,722 |
| Knox | 10,011 | 51.39% | 8,052 | 41.34% | 919 | 4.72% | 311 | 1.60% | 176 | 0.90% | 10 | 0.05% | 1,959 | 10.06% | 19,479 |
| Kosciusko | 8,326 | 61.66% | 4,836 | 35.81% | 114 | 0.84% | 21 | 0.16% | 207 | 1.53% | 0 | 0.00% | 3,490 | 25.84% | 13,504 |
| LaGrange | 3,852 | 68.02% | 1,687 | 29.79% | 21 | 0.37% | 17 | 0.30% | 86 | 1.52% | 0 | 0.00% | 2,165 | 38.23% | 5,663 |
| Lake | 26,296 | 69.15% | 7,136 | 18.77% | 1,449 | 3.81% | 2,815 | 7.40% | 292 | 0.77% | 40 | 0.11% | 19,160 | 50.38% | 38,028 |
| LaPorte | 11,204 | 65.00% | 5,459 | 31.67% | 340 | 1.97% | 105 | 0.61% | 129 | 0.75% | 1 | 0.01% | 5,745 | 33.33% | 17,238 |
| Lawrence | 6,808 | 58.15% | 4,709 | 40.22% | 146 | 1.25% | 1 | 0.01% | 44 | 0.38% | 0 | 0.00% | 2,099 | 17.93% | 11,708 |
| Madison | 15,704 | 49.76% | 13,325 | 42.22% | 1,833 | 5.81% | 17 | 0.05% | 672 | 2.13% | 11 | 0.03% | 2,379 | 7.54% | 31,562 |
| Marion | 79,957 | 54.93% | 61,460 | 42.22% | 3,262 | 2.24% | 262 | 0.18% | 582 | 0.40% | 48 | 0.03% | 18,497 | 12.71% | 145,571 |
| Marshall | 5,708 | 53.64% | 4,631 | 43.52% | 75 | 0.70% | 23 | 0.22% | 204 | 1.92% | 1 | 0.01% | 1,077 | 10.12% | 10,642 |
| Martin | 2,747 | 52.27% | 2,443 | 46.49% | 46 | 0.88% | 4 | 0.08% | 15 | 0.29% | 0 | 0.00% | 304 | 5.78% | 5,255 |
| Miami | 7,336 | 51.94% | 6,259 | 44.31% | 310 | 2.19% | 13 | 0.09% | 206 | 1.46% | 0 | 0.00% | 1,077 | 7.63% | 14,124 |
| Monroe | 5,633 | 53.65% | 4,751 | 45.25% | 51 | 0.49% | 6 | 0.06% | 59 | 0.56% | 0 | 0.00% | 882 | 8.40% | 10,500 |
| Montgomery | 8,792 | 54.49% | 7,159 | 44.37% | 106 | 0.66% | 6 | 0.04% | 71 | 0.44% | 1 | 0.01% | 1,633 | 10.12% | 16,135 |
| Morgan | 5,634 | 55.95% | 4,254 | 42.25% | 68 | 0.68% | 2 | 0.02% | 111 | 1.10% | 0 | 0.00% | 1,380 | 13.71% | 10,069 |
| Newton | 3,129 | 64.37% | 1,664 | 34.23% | 30 | 0.62% | 7 | 0.14% | 31 | 0.64% | 0 | 0.00% | 1,465 | 30.14% | 4,861 |
| Noble | 6,820 | 60.82% | 4,148 | 36.99% | 73 | 0.65% | 48 | 0.43% | 123 | 1.10% | 1 | 0.01% | 2,672 | 23.83% | 11,213 |
| Ohio | 1,177 | 50.91% | 1,097 | 47.45% | 1 | 0.04% | 0 | 0.00% | 37 | 1.60% | 0 | 0.00% | 80 | 3.46% | 2,312 |
| Orange | 4,726 | 58.86% | 3,222 | 40.13% | 60 | 0.75% | 6 | 0.07% | 15 | 0.19% | 0 | 0.00% | 1,504 | 18.73% | 8,029 |
| Owen | 2,997 | 49.18% | 2,948 | 48.38% | 100 | 1.64% | 14 | 0.23% | 35 | 0.57% | 0 | 0.00% | 49 | 0.80% | 6,094 |
| Parke | 4,989 | 56.13% | 3,543 | 39.86% | 148 | 1.67% | 108 | 1.22% | 93 | 1.05% | 7 | 0.08% | 1,446 | 16.27% | 8,888 |
| Perry | 3,864 | 51.76% | 3,560 | 47.69% | 25 | 0.33% | 7 | 0.09% | 9 | 0.12% | 0 | 0.00% | 304 | 4.07% | 7,465 |
| Pike | 4,069 | 51.75% | 3,067 | 39.01% | 256 | 3.26% | 405 | 5.15% | 31 | 0.39% | 35 | 0.45% | 1,002 | 12.74% | 7,863 |
| Porter | 5,570 | 72.68% | 1,671 | 21.80% | 126 | 1.64% | 233 | 3.04% | 62 | 0.81% | 2 | 0.03% | 3,899 | 50.87% | 7,664 |
| Posey | 4,802 | 49.72% | 4,695 | 48.61% | 45 | 0.47% | 17 | 0.18% | 98 | 1.01% | 1 | 0.01% | 107 | 1.11% | 9,658 |
| Pulaski | 2,740 | 53.88% | 2,228 | 43.82% | 76 | 1.49% | 5 | 0.10% | 36 | 0.71% | 0 | 0.00% | 512 | 10.07% | 5,085 |
| Putnam | 5,140 | 47.83% | 5,417 | 50.41% | 108 | 1.01% | 4 | 0.04% | 77 | 0.72% | 0 | 0.00% | -277 | -2.58% | 10,746 |
| Randolph | 8,773 | 65.28% | 4,198 | 31.24% | 85 | 0.63% | 10 | 0.07% | 370 | 2.75% | 3 | 0.02% | 4,575 | 34.04% | 13,439 |
| Ripley | 5,372 | 56.83% | 3,976 | 42.07% | 48 | 0.51% | 11 | 0.12% | 45 | 0.48% | 0 | 0.00% | 1,396 | 14.77% | 9,452 |
| Rush | 6,113 | 56.59% | 4,513 | 41.78% | 35 | 0.32% | 0 | 0.00% | 142 | 1.31% | 0 | 0.00% | 1,600 | 14.81% | 10,803 |
| Scott | 1,709 | 47.51% | 1,848 | 51.38% | 9 | 0.25% | 6 | 0.17% | 25 | 0.70% | 0 | 0.00% | -139 | -3.86% | 3,597 |
| Shelby | 6,336 | 47.15% | 6,845 | 50.94% | 55 | 0.41% | 10 | 0.07% | 191 | 1.42% | 0 | 0.00% | -509 | -3.79% | 13,437 |
| Spencer | 5,270 | 57.03% | 3,855 | 41.72% | 39 | 0.42% | 15 | 0.16% | 57 | 0.62% | 4 | 0.04% | 1,415 | 15.31% | 9,240 |
| St. Joseph | 17,675 | 56.46% | 12,355 | 39.47% | 798 | 2.55% | 161 | 0.51% | 310 | 0.99% | 6 | 0.02% | 5,320 | 16.99% | 31,305 |
| Starke | 2,683 | 62.92% | 1,467 | 34.40% | 52 | 1.22% | 25 | 0.59% | 36 | 0.84% | 1 | 0.02% | 1,216 | 28.52% | 4,264 |
| Steuben | 4,963 | 72.47% | 1,676 | 24.47% | 28 | 0.41% | 10 | 0.15% | 171 | 2.50% | 0 | 0.00% | 3,287 | 48.00% | 6,848 |
| Sullivan | 5,376 | 41.38% | 6,160 | 47.42% | 365 | 2.81% | 867 | 6.67% | 164 | 1.26% | 59 | 0.45% | -784 | -6.03% | 12,991 |
| Switzerland | 2,525 | 50.12% | 2,412 | 47.88% | 27 | 0.54% | 3 | 0.06% | 71 | 1.41% | 0 | 0.00% | 113 | 2.24% | 5,038 |
| Tippecanoe | 12,730 | 61.68% | 7,562 | 36.64% | 102 | 0.49% | 90 | 0.44% | 152 | 0.74% | 3 | 0.01% | 5,168 | 25.04% | 20,639 |
| Tipton | 4,357 | 51.43% | 3,956 | 46.69% | 46 | 0.54% | 9 | 0.11% | 104 | 1.23% | 0 | 0.00% | 401 | 4.73% | 8,472 |
| Union | 1,984 | 58.30% | 1,375 | 40.41% | 10 | 0.29% | 2 | 0.06% | 32 | 0.94% | 0 | 0.00% | 609 | 17.90% | 3,403 |
| Vanderburgh | 19,357 | 52.39% | 13,904 | 37.63% | 666 | 1.80% | 2,782 | 7.53% | 177 | 0.48% | 60 | 0.16% | 5,453 | 14.76% | 36,946 |
| Vermillion | 4,916 | 52.08% | 3,218 | 34.09% | 587 | 6.22% | 580 | 6.14% | 111 | 1.18% | 27 | 0.29% | 1,698 | 17.99% | 9,439 |
| Vigo | 18,668 | 50.30% | 15,739 | 42.41% | 1,498 | 4.04% | 935 | 2.52% | 241 | 0.65% | 33 | 0.09% | 2,929 | 7.89% | 37,114 |
| Wabash | 8,018 | 60.33% | 4,827 | 36.32% | 166 | 1.25% | 24 | 0.18% | 250 | 1.88% | 5 | 0.04% | 3,191 | 24.01% | 13,290 |
| Warren | 3,337 | 70.89% | 1,311 | 27.85% | 21 | 0.45% | 6 | 0.13% | 32 | 0.68% | 0 | 0.00% | 2,026 | 43.04% | 4,707 |
| Warrick | 4,675 | 51.75% | 3,915 | 43.34% | 199 | 2.20% | 147 | 1.63% | 92 | 1.02% | 5 | 0.06% | 760 | 8.41% | 9,033 |
| Washington | 3,708 | 46.86% | 4,157 | 52.53% | 16 | 0.20% | 1 | 0.01% | 31 | 0.39% | 0 | 0.00% | -449 | -5.67% | 7,913 |
| Wayne | 12,631 | 59.52% | 8,015 | 37.77% | 330 | 1.56% | 0 | 0.00% | 245 | 1.15% | 0 | 0.00% | 4,616 | 21.75% | 21,221 |
| Wells | 4,430 | 47.61% | 4,653 | 50.01% | 215 | 2.31% | 7 | 0.08% | 0 | 0.00% | 0 | 0.00% | -223 | -2.40% | 9,305 |
| White | 4,871 | 58.57% | 3,375 | 40.58% | 12 | 0.14% | 8 | 0.10% | 51 | 0.61% | 0 | 0.00% | 1,496 | 17.99% | 8,317 |
| Whitley | 4,530 | 52.50% | 3,929 | 45.53% | 34 | 0.39% | 14 | 0.16% | 122 | 1.41% | 0 | 0.00% | 601 | 6.96% | 8,629 |
| TOTAL | 696,370 | 55.14% | 511,364 | 40.49% | 24,703 | 1.96% | 16,499 | 1.31% | 13,462 | 1.07% | 566 | 0.04% | 185,006 | 14.65% | 1,262,964 |

== See also ==
- United States presidential elections in Indiana

== Bibliography ==
- Congressional Quarterly (1985). Congressional Quarterly's Guide to U.S. Elections (2nd ed.). Washington D.C.: Congressional Quarterly. ISBN 978-0-87187-339-2.
- Indiana (1921). Year Book of the State of Indiana for the Year 1920. Fort Wayne: Legislative Reference Bureau.
- Madison, James H. (1986). The Indiana Way: A State History. Bloomington: Indiana University Press.
- Phillips, Kevin P. (1969). The Emerging Republican Majority. New Rochelle, NY: Arlington House. LCCN 76-79602.
- Petersen, Svend (1963). A Statistical History of the American Presidential Elections. New York: Frederick Ungar Publishing Company. LCCN 62-21786.
- Spencer, William W.; Tennant, Maurice E., eds. (1920). Election Laws of Indiana [...]. Indianapolis: State Board of Election Commissioners.
