= Walnut Grove, Indiana =

Walnut Grove, Indiana, may refer to:

- Walnut Grove, Hamilton County, Indiana
- Walnut Grove, Warren County, Indiana
