= Durbin, Indiana =

Unincorporated community in Indiana, U.S.

Coordinates: 40°03′23″N 85°54′39″W

Durbin is an unincorporated community in Hamilton County, Indiana, in the United States.

== History ==
Durbin was laid out in 1888. A post office was established at Durbin in 1890, and remained in operation until it was discontinued in 1905.
