= Aroma, Indiana =

- Unincorporated community
- Location within Indiana Location within the United States
- Coordinates: 40°11′58″N 85°52′27″W
- Country: United States
- State: Indiana
- County: Hamilton
- Township: White River
- Established: 1836
- Elevation: 830 ft (250 m)
- ZIP code: 46031
- Area code: 765
- FIPS code: 18-02242
- GNIS feature ID: 430277

Aroma is an unincorporated community in White River Township, Hamilton County, Indiana.

== History ==
Aroma, founded in 1836, was named by William P. Haworth, who kept a small store there. Aroma was a descriptive name, perhaps for the scent of fresh-cut hay. A post office was established at Aroma in 1870, and remained in operation until it was discontinued in 1902.
