= Hamilton County, Indiana =

County in Indiana, United States

- County
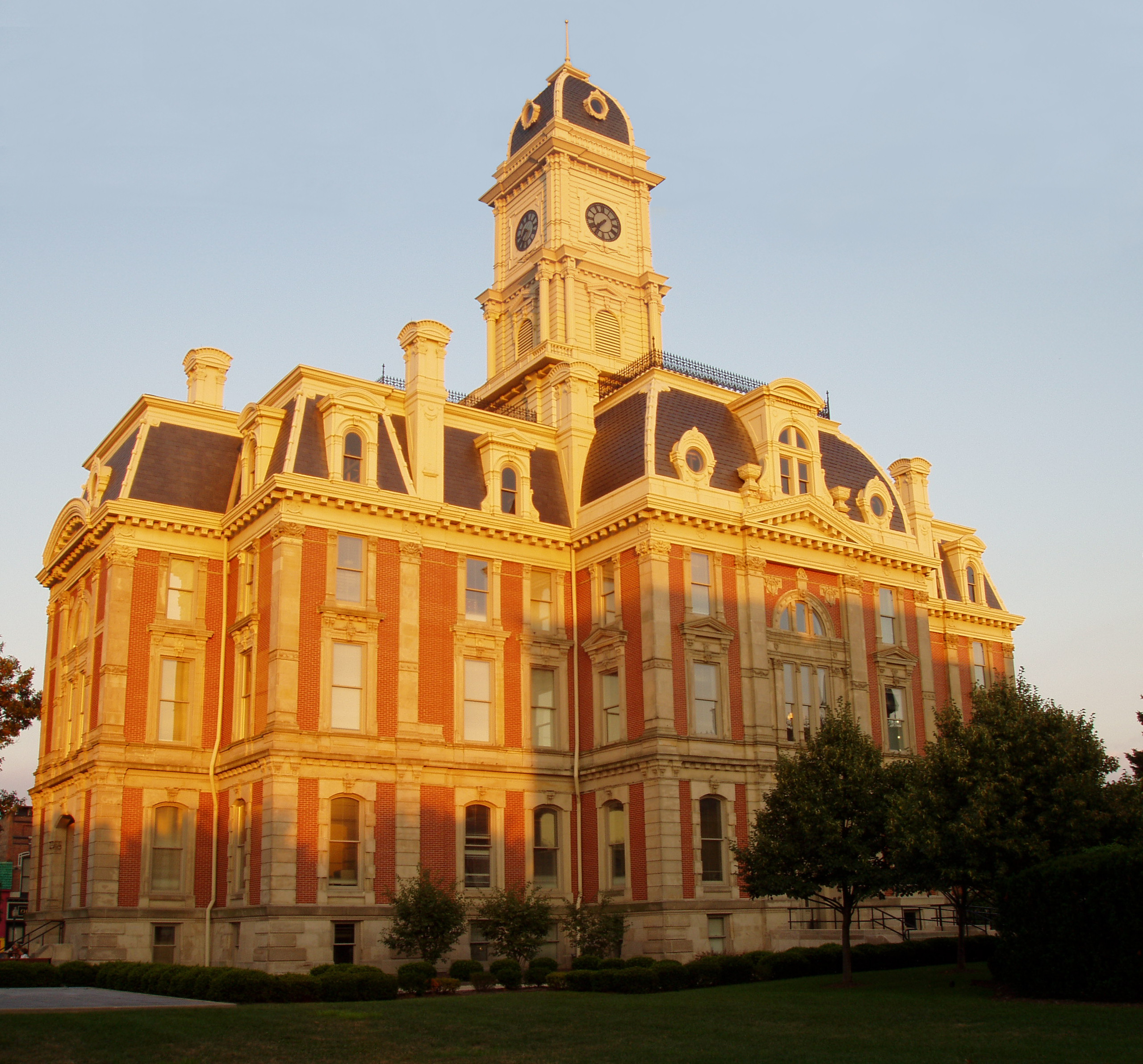
- Hamilton County Courthouse in Noblesville, Indiana

- Flag

- Location within the U.S. state of Indiana
- Coordinates: 40°04′N 86°03′W
- Country: United States
- State: Indiana
- Founded: 1823
- Named for: Alexander Hamilton
- Seat: Noblesville
- Largest city: Carmel

Area
  - Total: 402.44 sq mi (1,042.3 km^{2})
  - Land: 394.27 sq mi (1,021.2 km^{2})
  - Water: 8.17 sq mi (21.2 km^{2}) 2.03%

Population (2020)
  - Total: 347,467
  - Estimate (2025): 387,036 ▲
  - Density: 940/sq mi (364/km^{2})
- Time zone: UTC−5 (Eastern)
  - Summer (DST): UTC−4 (EDT)
- Congressional district: 5th
- Website: www.hamiltoncounty.in.gov
- Indiana county number 29; Fastest-growing county in the state; Most affluent county in the state

Hamilton County is a county in the U.S. state of Indiana. The 2020 United States census recorded a population of 347,467. The county seat is Noblesville.

Hamilton County is part of the Indianapolis metropolitan area. Since the beginning of the 21st century, Hamilton County has been the second most populous county in Central Indiana. It is the highest-income county in Indiana, and one of the highest-income counties in the United States.

Hamilton County's roots are in agriculture. However, after World War II, development in Indianapolis grew northward, and cities/towns in the southern and central part of Hamilton County developed as suburbs. Residential and commercial development have replaced many farm fields, although the county's northern part remains largely agricultural. In the first decades of the 21st century, the county is one of the fastest-growing counties in the United States. According to 2007 estimates by the US Census, the county's population increased from 182,740 in 2000 to an estimated 261,661 in 2007, making it the fastest-growing county of Indiana's 92. As of the 2010 census, Hamilton County surpassed St. Joseph County in population, making it the state's fourth most populous.

In 2020, Hamilton County was home to three of the state's 20 largest cities and towns: Carmel (5th), Fishers (6th), and Noblesville (12th).

Geist and Morse reservoirs are two man-made lakes in Hamilton County that offer boating, fishing, and waterfront living.

== History ==
The land containing Hamilton County was brought into the possession of the United States by the Treaty of St. Mary's in 1818. William Conner was the first white settler in the county. In the summer of 1822, after realizing there were enough settlers in the area, Conner and other settlers applied to the Indiana Legislature for a charter authorizing them to become a separate and independent county under Indiana law. The application was presented to the 1822–23 session of the Indiana General Assembly, and the act was passed and approved by the governor on January 8, 1823. The act took effect on the first Monday in April (April 7), 1823. The county commissioners first met on May 5, 1823, at Conner's house; it also served as the county circuit courthouse. The county was named for Alexander Hamilton, the first secretary of the US treasury.

2,165 soldiers from Hamilton County served in the Civil War. The last veteran residing in the county died in 1942.

Most Belgian immigration to Indiana occurred in the northwestern part of the state in Lake County and Porter County. However, in the 1890s, a significant number of Belgian immigrants also settled in the Noblesville area of Hamilton County. Similarly, chain migration led to numerous first generation Serbian immigrants who had settled in Indianapolis, and their Indiana-born children, to move to Arcadia, Carmel, Sheridan, Noblesville, and Cicero around the turn of the 20th century.

Like most of Indiana, the area was also heavily German-American, with Germans being the second-largest single ethnic group in the county at the time, second only to so-called "native born whites" whose ancestry extended to the original Thirteen Colonies and who were the largest ethnic group in Hamilton County at the turn of the century. During World War I, Hamilton County was noted for an extreme rise in anti-German sentiment. The name of Wilhelm Street in Noblesville was changed to Washington Street and German-Americans were subjected to bullying and abuse from their neighbors. German-Americans were one of the largest ethnic groups in the county, but the remaining two-thirds of the county were "whipped into an anti-German frenzy" during which Germanness and Americanness were presented as being antithetical throughout the press. Hamilton County was labeled the "most anti-German county" in Indiana, although such attitudes were common throughout the rest of Indiana as well. During most of 1940 and 1941, Indiana as a whole was very isolationist, with much of the state preferring that the country stay neutral in the European conflict. However, Hamilton County was a "hot-bed of interventionist and pro-British sentiment", which stood out because unlike many other places in Indiana, most people in Hamilton County were in favor of American entry into the war, and were in favor of providing Britain with as much aid as possible as well.

== Climate and weather ==
Noblesville, Indiana

Climate chart (precipitation, max. and min. temperature)
J	F	M	A	M	J	J	A	S	O	N	D
2.4 34 17	2.4 39 20	3.3 50 29	3.9 62 39	4.9 72 50	4.2 81 60	4.5 85 64	4.1 83 62	3.3 77 54	3 65 42	3.8 51 33	3.1 38 23
- █ Average max. and min. temperatures in °F
- █ Precipitation totals in inches
- Source: The Weather Channel
Metric conversion
J	F	M	A	M	J	J	A	S	O	N	D
61 1 −8	61 4 −7	83 10 −2	100 17 4	123 22 10	105 27 16	114 29 18	103 28 17	84 25 12	77 18 6	96 11 1	80 3 −5
- █ Average max. and min. temperatures in °C
- █ Precipitation totals in mm

In recent years, average temperatures in Noblesville have ranged from a low of 17 °F (−8 °C) in January to a high of 85 °F (29 °C) in July, although a record low of −23 °F (−31 °C) was recorded in January 1994 and a record high of 105 °F (41 °C) was recorded in July 1954. Average monthly precipitation ranged from 2.42 inches (61 mm) in January to 4.86 inches (123 mm) in May. Hamilton County's climate thus falls within the Köppen climate classification system as a humid continental temperate climate, with pleasant spring and fall seasons surrounded by harsh cold and humid heat in the winter and summer, respectively.

== Geography ==
According to the 2010 census, the county has a total area of 402.44 square miles (1,042.3 km^{2}), of which 394.27 square miles (1,021.2 km^{2}) (or 97.97%) is land and 8.17 square miles (21.2 km^{2}) (or 2.03%) is water.

=== Major highways ===
- Interstate 69
- Interstate 465
- U.S. Route 31
- U.S. Route 52
- U.S. Route 421
- State Road 19
- State Road 32
- State Road 37
- State Road 38
- State Road 47
- State Road 213

=== Airport ===
- KUMP - Indianapolis Metropolitan Airport

=== Adjacent counties ===
- Tipton County — North
- Madison County — East
- Hancock County — Southeast
- Marion County — South
- Boone County — West
- Clinton County — Northwest

== Cities and towns ==
- Arcadia
- Atlanta
- Carmel
- Cicero
- Fishers
- Noblesville
- Sheridan
- Westfield

== Unincorporated areas ==
- Aroma
- Bakers Corner
- Boxley
- Clare
- Clarksville
- Deming
- Durbin
- Eagletown
- Ekin
- Fishersburg (mostly in Madison County)
- Hortonville
- Lamong
- Luxhaven
- Millersburg
- New Britton
- Omega
- Riverwood
- Roberts Settlement
- Strawtown
- Walnut Grove

== Townships ==
- Adams
- Clay
- Delaware
- Fall Creek
- Jackson
- Noblesville
- Westfield Washington
- Wayne
- White River

== Demographics ==
Historical population
Census	Pop.	Note	%±
1890	26,123		—
1900	29,914		14.5%
1910	27,026		−9.7%
1920	24,222		−10.4%
1930	23,444		−3.2%
1940	24,614		5.0%
1950	28,491		15.8%
1960	40,132		40.9%
1970	54,532		35.9%
1980	82,027		50.4%
1990	108,936		32.8%
2000	182,740		67.7%
2010	274,569		50.3%
2020	347,467		26.5%
2025 (est.)	387,036	▲	11.4%
US Decennial Census; 1790-1960 1900-1990; 1990-2000 2010-2019

=== Racial and ethnic composition ===
Hamilton County, Indiana – Racial and ethnic composition Note: the US Census treats Hispanic/Latino as an ethnic category. This table excludes Latinos from the racial categories and assigns them to a separate category. Hispanics/Latinos may be of any race.
Race / Ethnicity (NH = Non-Hispanic)	Pop 1980	Pop 1990	Pop 2000	Pop 2010	Pop 2020	% 1980	% 1990	% 2000	% 2010	% 2020
White alone (NH)	80,659	106,193	170,674	237,317	275,185	98.33%	97.48%	93.40%	86.43%	79.20%
Black or African American alone (NH)	358	660	2,775	9,395	14,674	0.44%	0.61%	1.52%	3.42%	4.22%
Native American or Alaska Native alone (NH)	74	153	275	437	402	0.09%	0.14%	0.15%	0.16%	0.12%
Asian alone (NH)	410	1,175	4,423	13,122	23,459	0.50%	1.08%	2.42%	4.78%	6.75%
Native Hawaiian or Pacific Islander alone (NH)	x	x	49	72	134	x	x	0.03%	0.03%	0.04%
Other race alone (NH)	94	30	170	591	1,483	0.11%	0.03%	0.09%	0.22%	0.43%
Mixed race or Multiracial (NH)	x	x	1,463	4,209	14,024	x	x	0.80%	1.53%	4.04%
Hispanic or Latino (any race)	432	725	2,911	9,426	18,106	0.53%	0.67%	1.59%	3.43%	5.21%
Total	82,027	108,936	182,740	274,569	347,467	100.00%	100.00%	100.00%	100.00%	100.00%

=== 2020 census ===
As of the 2020 census, the county had a population of 347,467. The median age was 38.0 years. 27.1% of residents were under the age of 18 and 13.4% of residents were 65 years of age or older. For every 100 females there were 94.9 males, and for every 100 females age 18 and over there were 91.8 males age 18 and over.

The racial makeup of the county was 80.3% White, 4.3% Black or African American, 0.2% American Indian and Alaska Native, 6.8% Asian, <0.1% Native Hawaiian and Pacific Islander, 1.9% from some other race, and 6.5% from two or more races. Hispanic or Latino residents of any race comprised 5.2% of the population.

94.3% of residents lived in urban areas, while 5.7% lived in rural areas.

There were 128,475 households in the county, of which 38.7% had children under the age of 18 living in them. Of all households, 61.2% were married-couple households, 12.7% were households with a male householder and no spouse or partner present, and 21.0% were households with a female householder and no spouse or partner present. About 21.6% of all households were made up of individuals and 8.0% had someone living alone who was 65 years of age or older.

There were 135,064 housing units, of which 4.9% were vacant. Among occupied housing units, 76.5% were owner-occupied and 23.5% were renter-occupied. The homeowner vacancy rate was 1.1% and the rental vacancy rate was 8.2%.

=== 2010 census ===
Age and gender distribution in Hamilton County

As of the 2010 United States census, there were 274,569 people, 99,835 households, and 74,755 families in the county. The population density was 696.4 inhabitants per square mile (268.9/km^{2}). There were 106,772 housing units at an average density of 270.8 per square mile (104.6/km^{2}). The racial makeup of the county was 88.5% white, 4.8% Asian, 3.5% black or African American, 0.2% American Indian, 1.2% from other races, and 1.8% from two or more races. Those of Hispanic or Latino origin made up 3.4% of the population. In terms of ancestry, 29.0% were German, 14.6% were Irish, 13.0% were English, and 7.7% were American.

Of the 99,835 households, 43.2% had children under the age of 18 living with them, 63.2% were married couples living together, 8.3% had a female householder with no husband present, 25.1% were non-families, and 20.5% of all households were made up of individuals. The average household size was 2.73 and the average family size was 3.19. The median age was 35.6 years.

The median income for a household in the county was $47,697 and the median income for a family was $95,376. Males had a median income of $67,221 versus $44,273 for females. The per capita income for the county was $38,500. About 3.6% of families and 4.5% of the population were below the poverty line, including 5.6% of those under age 18 and 3.5% of those age 65 or over.

=== Life expectancy ===
The life expectancy in Hamilton County in 2010 was 81.21 years, up 6.6 percent from 76.16 years in 1980. By comparison, the US national average in 2010 was 78.49 years.

== Government ==
The county executive body is the Board of County Commissioners, which consists of three Commissioners representing their three respective districts.

District 1 consists of Carmel, which is coextensive with Clay Township. District 2 consists of Delaware Township and Noblesville Township. District 3 consists of Adams Township, Fall Creek Township, Jackson Township, Washington Township, Wayne Township, White River Township, Arcadia, Atlanta, Cicero, Sheridan and Westfield.

The current (2024) County Commissioners are:

- Christine Altman - District 1
- Steven C. Dillinger - District 2
- Mark Heirbrandt - District 3

The county's finances are managed by the County Council, which consists of seven members, four elected by district and three elected at-large.

District 1 consists of parts of Clay Township (45 precincts). District 2 consists of Delaware, Fall Creek, and Wayne Townships. District 3 consists of Noblesville, Jackson and White River Townships. District 4 consists of parts of Clay Township (17 precincts), Adams and Washington Townships.

The current (2024) members of the County Council are:

- Tim Griffin - District 1
- Amy Massillamany - District 2
- Mark Hall - District 3
- Ken Alexander - District 4
- Brad Beaver - Council member at large
- Steven Nation - Council member at large
- Sue Maki - Council member at large

Hamilton County is part of Indiana's 5th congressional district; Indiana Senate districts 20, 21, 25, 29, and 31; and Indiana House of Representatives districts 24, 29, 32, 37, 39, and 88.

== Politics ==
The county is located in Indiana's 5th congressional district, which is currently represented by Republican Victoria Spartz.

Hamilton County has long been reckoned as a Republican stronghold. Woodrow Wilson remains the only Democratic presidential candidate to carry Hamilton County, a feat he accomplished in 1912, when Theodore Roosevelt's third-party candidacy split the Republican vote and allowed Wilson to carry the county with a slim plurality over incumbent President William H. Taft. Otherwise, the county has reliably voted Republican in every presidential race since 1856, prior to which it supported the Whig candidate in every election of the Second Party System.

The county has long been reckoned as a classic bastion of suburban conservatism. Underlining this, in modern political history, the county rejected Franklin Roosevelt in all four of his bids for president, and Barry Goldwater easily carried the county in 1964 with 61 percent of the vote. In 2018, Senator Joe Donnelly came within 10 percent of winning the county, winning 44.4% of the vote in his re-election loss.

In 2020, Democrat Joe Biden won 45.4% of the vote in the county, while Donald Trump won 52.2% of the vote. It was the first time since 1936 that a Democrat won 40 percent of the county's vote, and only the second time since 1932 that a Republican had won the county by fewer than 10 points. Biden carried both Carmel and Fishers.

In 2024, Kamala Harris improved slightly on Biden's performance, winning 46% of the vote in the county. This is the highest percentage of the vote ever won by a Democratic presidential nominee despite Harris losing the presidential election, while Trump received 52% of the vote.

In 2026, Democratic state senator J. D. Ford defeated incumbent Victoria Spartz in Indiana's 5th congressional district, receiving 55.8% of the vote in Hamilton County, while Spartz garnered 44.2%. Ford's win marked a significant political shift, as Democrats flipped many of the county's seats in the state legislature and won a majority on the county council. The results reflect the county's growing political competitiveness and the trend of increasing Democratic support.

Hamilton County is one of nine counties that shifted more than 25 percentage points to the left from 2012 to 2024, as well as the most left-trending county in that time period outside of Metro Atlanta in Georgia. Although still Republican-leaning, the county's Republican margin shrank from 34% to 6%, despite Indiana remaining a Republican stronghold.

United States presidential election results for Hamilton County, Indiana
Year	Republican / Whig		Democratic		Third party(ies)	
Year	No.	%	No.	%	No.	%
1824	10	22.22%	4	8.89%	31	68.89%
1828	156	73.93%	55	26.07%	0	0.00%
1832	251	60.19%	166	39.81%	0	0.00%
1836	569	68.47%	262	31.53%	0	0.00%
1840	972	58.55%	688	41.45%	0	0.00%
1844	859	48.70%	766	43.42%	139	7.88%
1848	809	41.90%	805	41.69%	317	16.42%
1852	971	41.62%	961	41.19%	401	17.19%
1856	1,748	58.84%	1,185	39.89%	38	1.28%
1860	2,195	63.79%	1,144	33.25%	102	2.96%
1864	3,225	74.69%	1,093	25.31%	0	0.00%
1868	3,242	71.73%	1,278	28.27%	0	0.00%
1872	3,180	68.50%	1,462	31.50%	0	0.00%
1876	3,259	61.01%	1,897	35.51%	186	3.48%
1880	3,638	61.69%	2,093	35.49%	166	2.81%
1884	3,565	57.20%	2,357	37.82%	310	4.97%
1888	3,599	56.04%	2,412	37.56%	411	6.40%
1892	3,627	54.52%	2,492	37.46%	533	8.01%
1896	4,643	59.82%	2,947	37.97%	171	2.20%
1900	4,788	58.62%	2,931	35.88%	449	5.50%
1904	4,832	63.50%	2,469	32.44%	309	4.06%
1908	4,421	56.48%	2,947	37.65%	460	5.88%
1912	2,247	31.86%	2,463	34.93%	2,342	33.21%
1916	3,951	54.78%	2,799	38.81%	462	6.41%
1920	7,897	63.04%	4,280	34.17%	350	2.79%
1924	7,463	64.91%	3,785	32.92%	250	2.17%
1928	7,960	68.36%	3,611	31.01%	74	0.64%
1932	7,100	53.08%	5,999	44.85%	277	2.07%
1936	7,323	56.90%	5,396	41.93%	151	1.17%
1940	8,931	64.73%	4,791	34.72%	75	0.54%
1944	8,297	66.06%	4,101	32.65%	162	1.29%
1948	7,521	62.12%	4,384	36.21%	202	1.67%
1952	10,843	69.69%	4,564	29.33%	153	0.98%
1956	11,220	68.96%	4,974	30.57%	77	0.47%
1960	13,409	70.63%	5,511	29.03%	64	0.34%
1964	12,060	61.28%	7,553	38.38%	68	0.35%
1968	14,250	67.63%	4,586	21.77%	2,233	10.60%
1972	20,247	82.74%	4,151	16.96%	72	0.29%
1976	21,828	72.86%	7,857	26.23%	273	0.91%
1980	26,218	74.22%	7,036	19.92%	2,073	5.87%
1984	30,254	82.30%	6,364	17.31%	143	0.39%
1988	36,654	80.36%	8,853	19.41%	108	0.24%
1992	34,622	62.46%	10,215	18.43%	10,597	19.12%
1996	42,792	69.45%	14,153	22.97%	4,674	7.59%
2000	56,372	74.25%	18,002	23.71%	1,552	2.04%
2004	77,887	74.24%	26,388	25.15%	631	0.60%
2008	78,401	60.64%	49,704	38.45%	1,174	0.91%
2012	90,747	66.20%	43,796	31.95%	2,546	1.86%
2016	87,404	56.04%	57,263	36.72%	11,291	7.24%
2020	101,587	52.21%	88,390	45.43%	4,600	2.36%
2024	102,318	51.74%	90,394	45.71%	5,055	2.56%

== Education ==
School districts include:

- Carmel Clay Schools
- Hamilton Heights School Corporation
- Hamilton Southeastern Schools
- Sheridan Community Schools
- Noblesville Schools
- Westfield-Washington Schools

== See also ==
- National Register of Historic Places listings in Hamilton County, Indiana
