= Omega, Indiana =

- Unincorporated community
- Location within Indiana Location within the United States
- Coordinates: 40°11′54″N 85°56′21″W
- Country: United States
- State: Indiana
- County: Hamilton
- Township: White River
- Elevation: 853 ft (260 m)
- ZIP code: 46030
- FIPS code: 18-56628
- GNIS feature ID: 440661

Omega is an unincorporated community in White River Township, Hamilton County, Indiana.

== History ==
Omega was known popularly in the 19th century as Dog Town, after a mail carrier complained of the number of dogs there. A post office was established as Omega in 1870, and remained in operation until it was discontinued in 1902.
