= 1964 United States presidential election in Indiana =

- November 3, 1964
- Turnout: 71.7% ▼5.2 pp

Nominee	Lyndon B. Johnson	Barry Goldwater
Party	Democratic	Republican
Home state	Texas	Arizona
Running mate	Hubert Humphrey	William E. Miller
Electoral vote	13	0
Popular vote	1,170,848	911,118
Percentage	55.98%	43.56%
County results
Johnson
40–50%
50–60%
60–70%
70–80%
Goldwater
40–50%
50–60%
60–70%
President before election
Lyndon B. Johnson
Democratic
Elected President
Lyndon B. Johnson
Democratic

A presidential election was held in Indiana on November 3, 1964, as part of the 1964 United States presidential election. The Democratic ticket of the incumbent president of the United States Lyndon B. Johnson and the senior U.S. senator from Minnesota Hubert Humphrey defeated the Republican ticket of the junior U.S. senator from Arizona Barry Goldwater and the U.S. representative from New York's 40th congressional district William E. Miller. Johnson defeated Goldwater in the national election with 486 electoral votes.

== Primary elections ==
=== Democratic Party ===
The governor of Alabama George Wallace challenged Johnson for the Democratic nomination in the 1964 presidential primaries. Many observers assumed that Wallace, a segregationist, would do well in Indiana, based on the state's history of Ku Klux Klan activity, anti-Black racism, and conservative politics. Coming on the heels of a stronger-than-expected performance in Wisconsin, the Indiana primary was seen as a crucial "test" of Wallace's candidacy.

Johnson did not appear on the Indiana ballot; instead, Wallace faced the Democratic governor of Indiana Matthew E. Welsh, who ran as a stalking horse for the incumbent. Welsh's slogan was "Clear the Way for LBJ; Vote for Welsh the 5th of May." Welsh took seriously the possibility that Wallace could carry Indiana and ran a "vigorous" campaign. With no presidential ambitions of his own, his sole objective was to prevent a strong showing for Wallace that could embarrass the state and undermine the national civil rights movement.

The race received national press attention, with prominent journalists including Walter Cronkite traveling to Indiana to cover the primary. Welsh defeated Wallace by a wide margin; while Wallace received significant support from Lake and Porter counties, his statewide percentage fell below that which he had polled in Wisconsin one month prior.

Indiana Democratic primary, May 5, 1964
Party	Candidate	Votes	%
Democratic	Matthew E. Welsh	376,023	64.94
Democratic	George Wallace	172,646	29.82
Democratic	Lar Daly	15,160	2.62
Democratic	John H. Latham	8,067	1.39
Democratic	Fay T. Carpenter Swain	7,140	1.23
Total votes		579,036	100.00

=== Republican Party ===
Indiana Republican primary, May 5, 1964
Party	Candidate	Votes	%
Republican	Barry Goldwater	267,935	67.04
Republican	Harold Stassen	107,157	26.81
Republican	Frank R. Beckwith	17,884	4.47
Republican	Joseph G. Ettl	6,704	1.68
Total votes		399,680	100.00

== General election ==
=== Statistics ===
Johnson became the first Democrat to carry Indiana in a presidential election since Franklin D. Roosevelt in 1936 and the only Democratic presidential candidate to carry Randolph and Wabash counties. As of 2024, this is the most recent election in which Allen, Adams, Bartholomew, Brown, Benton, Carroll, Cass, Clay, Clinton, Daviess, Decatur, DeKalb, Elkhart, Fayette, Fountain, Franklin, Grant, Hancock, Henry, Howard, Huntington, Jackson, Jay, Jennings, LaGrange, Lawrence, Marshall, Miami, Montgomery, Noble, Orange, Parke, Pulaski, Putnam, Ripley, Shelby, Tipton, Warren, Wells, White, and Whitley counties voted for the Democratic ticket.

=== Results ===
1964 United States presidential election in Indiana
Party	Candidate	Votes	%	±%
Democratic	Lyndon B. Johnson Hubert Humphrey	1,170,848	55.98	▲11.38
Republican	Barry Goldwater William E. Miller	911,118	43.56	▼11.47
Prohibition	E. Harold Munn Mark R. Shaw	8,266	0.40	▲0.08
Socialist Labor	Eric Hass Henning A. Blomen	1,374	0.07	▲0.02
Total votes		2,091,606	100.00	

=== Results by county ===
1964 United States presidential election in Indiana by county
County	Lyndon B. Johnson Democratic		Barry Goldwater Republican		Others		Margin		Total
County	Votes	%	Votes	%	Votes	%	Votes	%	Total
Adams	6,637	60.48%	4,230	38.55%	106	0.97%	2,407	21.93%	10,973
Allen	50,706	50.53%	49,284	49.11%	363	0.36%	1,422	1.42%	100,353
Bartholomew	12,940	53.72%	11,026	45.77%	124	0.51%	1,914	7.95%	24,090
Benton	2,940	50.42%	2,886	49.49%	5	0.09%	54	0.93%	5,831
Blackford	4,210	61.65%	2,552	37.37%	67	0.98%	1,658	24.28%	6,829
Boone	6,716	47.36%	7,419	52.32%	46	0.32%	-703	-4.96%	14,181
Brown	2,135	60.24%	1,390	39.22%	19	0.54%	745	21.02%	3,544
Carroll	4,789	54.96%	3,896	44.71%	29	0.33%	893	10.25%	8,714
Cass	11,148	58.74%	7,735	40.76%	95	0.50%	3,413	17.98%	18,978
Clark	17,330	68.89%	7,701	30.61%	125	0.50%	9,629	38.28%	25,156
Clay	6,528	54.28%	5,412	45.00%	86	0.72%	1,116	9.28%	12,026
Clinton	8,353	53.61%	7,157	45.93%	72	0.46%	1,196	7.68%	15,582
Crawford	2,514	57.40%	1,828	41.74%	38	0.87%	686	15.66%	4,380
Daviess	6,528	50.62%	6,319	49.00%	48	0.37%	209	1.62%	12,895
Dearborn	7,699	58.33%	5,473	41.47%	26	0.20%	2,226	16.86%	13,198
Decatur	5,564	53.94%	4,702	45.58%	49	0.48%	862	8.36%	10,315
DeKalb	7,559	54.42%	6,210	44.71%	120	0.86%	1,349	9.71%	13,889
Delaware	28,469	58.48%	20,022	41.13%	187	0.38%	8,447	17.35%	48,678
Dubois	10,114	72.56%	3,800	27.26%	25	0.18%	6,314	45.30%	13,939
Elkhart	21,679	51.72%	19,870	47.41%	365	0.87%	1,809	4.31%	41,914
Fayette	6,713	58.92%	4,637	40.70%	43	0.38%	2,076	18.22%	11,393
Floyd	15,656	66.23%	7,834	33.14%	148	0.63%	7,822	33.09%	23,638
Fountain	5,574	54.23%	4,666	45.40%	38	0.37%	908	8.83%	10,278
Franklin	4,021	57.48%	2,956	42.26%	18	0.26%	1,065	15.22%	6,995
Fulton	4,374	49.60%	4,410	50.01%	34	0.39%	-36	-0.41%	8,818
Gibson	10,507	63.84%	5,865	35.64%	86	0.52%	4,642	28.20%	16,458
Grant	17,574	54.08%	14,688	45.20%	232	0.71%	2,886	8.88%	32,494
Greene	8,574	58.85%	5,919	40.62%	77	0.53%	2,655	18.23%	14,570
Hamilton	7,553	38.38%	12,060	61.28%	68	0.35%	-4,507	-22.90%	19,681
Hancock	6,573	50.59%	6,370	49.03%	50	0.38%	203	1.56%	12,993
Harrison	5,949	61.28%	3,671	37.81%	88	0.91%	2,278	23.47%	9,708
Hendricks	8,857	43.41%	11,497	56.34%	51	0.25%	-2,640	-12.93%	20,405
Henry	12,374	54.52%	10,184	44.87%	139	0.61%	2,190	9.65%	22,697
Howard	17,809	57.56%	12,897	41.68%	235	0.76%	4,912	15.88%	30,941
Huntington	9,308	55.26%	7,438	44.16%	98	0.58%	1,870	11.10%	16,844
Jackson	8,572	57.26%	6,285	41.98%	114	0.76%	2,287	15.28%	14,971
Jasper	3,995	46.91%	4,497	52.81%	24	0.28%	-502	-5.90%	8,516
Jay	6,781	59.91%	4,439	39.22%	98	0.87%	2,342	20.69%	11,318
Jefferson	6,694	57.78%	4,808	41.50%	84	0.73%	1,886	16.28%	11,586
Jennings	4,307	55.14%	3,469	44.41%	35	0.45%	838	10.73%	7,811
Johnson	10,099	48.87%	10,472	50.68%	92	0.45%	-373	-1.81%	20,663
Knox	12,678	62.11%	7,612	37.29%	121	0.59%	5,066	24.82%	20,411
Kosciusko	8,759	45.18%	10,488	54.10%	141	0.73%	-1,729	-8.92%	19,388
LaGrange	2,818	49.96%	2,785	49.38%	37	0.66%	33	0.58%	5,640
Lake	134,978	64.42%	73,722	35.19%	823	0.39%	61,256	29.23%	209,523
LaPorte	22,220	57.57%	16,270	42.16%	104	0.27%	5,950	15.41%	38,594
Lawrence	8,677	51.17%	8,186	48.28%	93	0.55%	491	2.89%	16,956
Madison	33,325	57.73%	24,171	41.87%	233	0.40%	9,154	15.86%	57,729
Marion	152,418	51.43%	143,015	48.25%	948	0.32%	9,403	3.18%	296,381
Marshall	8,397	51.15%	7,895	48.10%	123	0.75%	502	3.05%	16,415
Martin	3,137	60.96%	2,000	38.87%	9	0.17%	1,137	22.09%	5,146
Miami	7,667	54.53%	6,270	44.59%	123	0.87%	1,397	9.94%	14,060
Monroe	11,918	53.27%	10,309	46.08%	145	0.65%	1,609	7.19%	22,372
Montgomery	8,042	50.48%	7,823	49.11%	65	0.41%	219	1.37%	15,930
Morgan	7,011	45.44%	8,347	54.10%	70	0.45%	-1,336	-8.66%	15,428
Newton	2,547	47.70%	2,780	52.06%	13	0.24%	-233	-4.36%	5,340
Noble	7,621	57.03%	5,682	42.52%	60	0.45%	1,939	14.51%	13,363
Ohio	1,397	60.53%	905	39.21%	6	0.26%	492	21.32%	2,308
Orange	4,490	51.55%	4,187	48.07%	33	0.38%	303	3.48%	8,710
Owen	3,339	54.20%	2,788	45.26%	33	0.54%	551	8.94%	6,160
Parke	4,034	52.93%	3,570	46.84%	17	0.22%	464	6.09%	7,621
Perry	6,226	66.65%	3,090	33.08%	25	0.27%	3,136	33.57%	9,341
Pike	4,519	62.14%	2,703	37.17%	50	0.69%	1,816	24.97%	7,272
Porter	12,975	47.00%	14,480	52.45%	152	0.55%	-1,505	-5.45%	27,607
Posey	6,164	63.09%	3,573	36.57%	33	0.34%	2,591	26.52%	9,770
Pulaski	3,408	51.37%	3,202	48.27%	24	0.36%	206	3.10%	6,634
Putnam	6,275	53.96%	5,331	45.84%	24	0.21%	944	8.12%	11,630
Randolph	6,804	50.38%	6,551	48.50%	151	1.12%	253	1.88%	13,506
Ripley	5,933	56.23%	4,587	43.47%	32	0.30%	1,346	12.76%	10,552
Rush	4,450	49.31%	4,507	49.94%	68	0.75%	-57	-0.63%	9,025
St. Joseph	65,844	61.91%	39,872	37.49%	630	0.59%	25,972	24.42%	106,346
Scott	4,205	67.79%	1,992	32.11%	6	0.10%	2,213	35.68%	6,203
Shelby	9,078	55.17%	7,310	44.42%	67	0.41%	1,768	10.75%	16,455
Spencer	4,834	54.72%	3,980	45.05%	20	0.23%	854	9.67%	8,834
Starke	4,838	58.14%	3,466	41.65%	17	0.20%	1,372	16.49%	8,321
Steuben	3,999	49.34%	4,075	50.28%	31	0.38%	-76	-0.94%	8,105
Sullivan	7,351	65.28%	3,867	34.34%	42	0.37%	3,484	30.94%	11,260
Switzerland	2,231	61.29%	1,390	38.19%	19	0.52%	841	23.10%	3,640
Tippecanoe	20,257	51.45%	19,036	48.35%	79	0.20%	1,221	3.10%	39,372
Tipton	4,410	53.03%	3,863	46.45%	43	0.52%	547	6.58%	8,316
Union	1,463	48.69%	1,531	50.95%	11	0.37%	-68	-2.26%	3,005
Vanderburgh	45,796	62.39%	27,231	37.10%	380	0.52%	18,565	25.29%	73,407
Vermillion	5,957	63.49%	3,397	36.21%	28	0.30%	2,560	27.28%	9,382
Vigo	27,606	59.05%	19,001	40.64%	144	0.31%	8,605	18.41%	46,751
Wabash	7,485	51.50%	6,905	47.51%	145	1.00%	580	3.99%	14,535
Warren	2,261	51.10%	2,154	48.68%	10	0.23%	107	2.42%	4,425
Warrick	7,222	62.04%	4,376	37.59%	42	0.36%	2,846	24.45%	11,640
Washington	4,943	57.66%	3,598	41.97%	32	0.37%	1,345	15.69%	8,573
Wayne	15,269	49.70%	15,342	49.93%	113	0.37%	-73	-0.23%	30,724
Wells	5,945	59.12%	4,018	39.96%	92	0.91%	1,927	19.16%	10,055
White	5,407	51.72%	5,015	47.97%	33	0.32%	392	3.75%	10,455
Whitley	5,798	53.95%	4,896	45.56%	53	0.49%	902	8.39%	10,747
TOTAL	1,170,848	55.98%	911,118	43.56%	9,640	0.46%	259,730	12.42%	2,091,606

==== Counties that flipped from Republican to Democratic ====
- Delaware
- Madison
- Spencer
- Starke
- Tippecanoe
- Vanderburgh
- Crawford
- Gibson
- Jefferson
- Knox
- Pike
- Posey
- Scott
- Sullivan
- Adams
- Allen
- Bartholomew
- Benton
- Brown
- Blackford
- Carroll
- Cass
- Clay
- Clinton
- Daviess
- Decatur
- Dearborn
- DeKalb
- Elkhart
- Fayette
- Fountain
- Franklin
- Grant
- Greene
- Hancock
- Harrison
- Henry
- Howard
- Huntington
- Jackson
- Jay
- Jennings
- LaGrange
- LaPorte
- Lawrence
- Marshall
- Martin
- Marion
- Miami
- Montgomery
- Monroe
- Noble
- Ohio
- Orange
- Owen
- Parke
- Pulaski
- Putnam
- Randolph
- Ripley
- Shelby
- Tipton
- Wabash
- Warren
- Warrick
- Washington
- Wells
- White
- Whitley

== See also ==
- United States presidential elections in Indiana

== Bibliography ==
- Bottorf, John D. (1964). General Election Report of the Secretary of State of the State of Indiana: 1964 General Election Statistics. Indianapolis: Indiana Secretary of State.
- Congressional Quarterly (1985). Congressional Quarterly's Guide to U.S. Elections (2nd ed.). Washington D.C.: Congressional Quarterly.
- Madison, James H. (1986). The Indiana Way: A State History. Bloomington: Indiana University Press.
- McGillivray, Alice V.; Scammon, Richard M. (1994). America at the Polls, 1960–1992: Kennedy to Clinton; A Handbook of American Presidential Election Statistics. Washington, D.C.: Congressional Quarterly.
- Menendez, Albert J. (2009). The Geography of Presidential Elections in the United States, 1868–2004. Jefferson, NC: McFarland and Company.
- Sullivan, Robert David (June 29, 2016). "How the Red and Blue Map Evolved over the Past Century". America.
- Welsh, Matthew E. (1994). "The 1964 Primary Election". In Gray, Ralph D. (ed.). Indiana History: A Book of Readings. Bloomington: Indiana University Press. pp. 392–402.
