= New Britton, Indiana =

Unincorporated community in Indiana, U.S.

Coordinates: 39°58′47″N 86°00′36″W

New Britton is an unincorporated community in Delaware Township, Hamilton County, Indiana.

== History ==
New Britton was laid out in 1851. A post office was established at New Britton in 1856, and remained in operation until it was discontinued in 1907.
