= 1856 United States presidential election in Indiana =

- November 4, 1856
- Turnout: 88.3% ▲8.0 pp
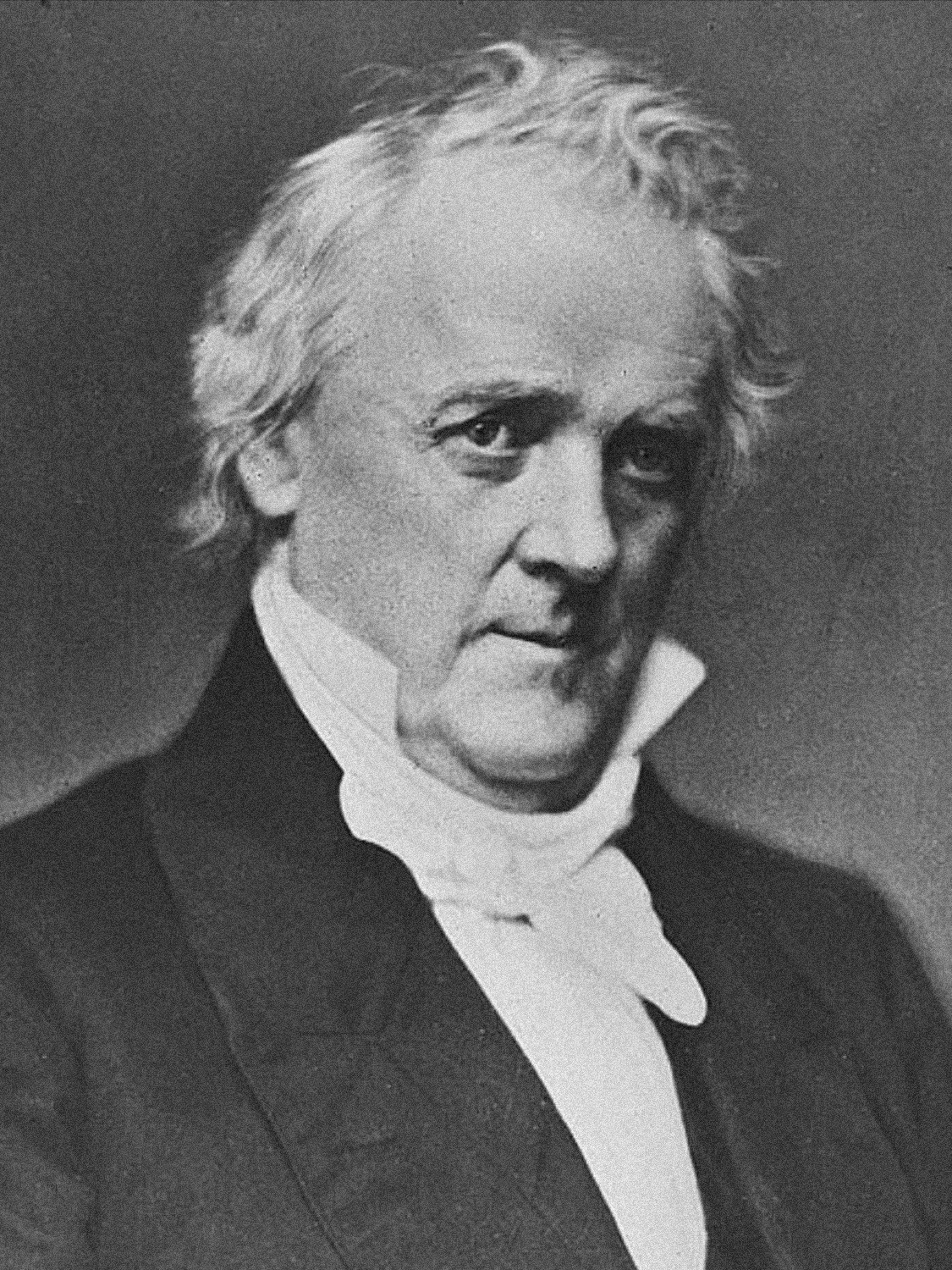

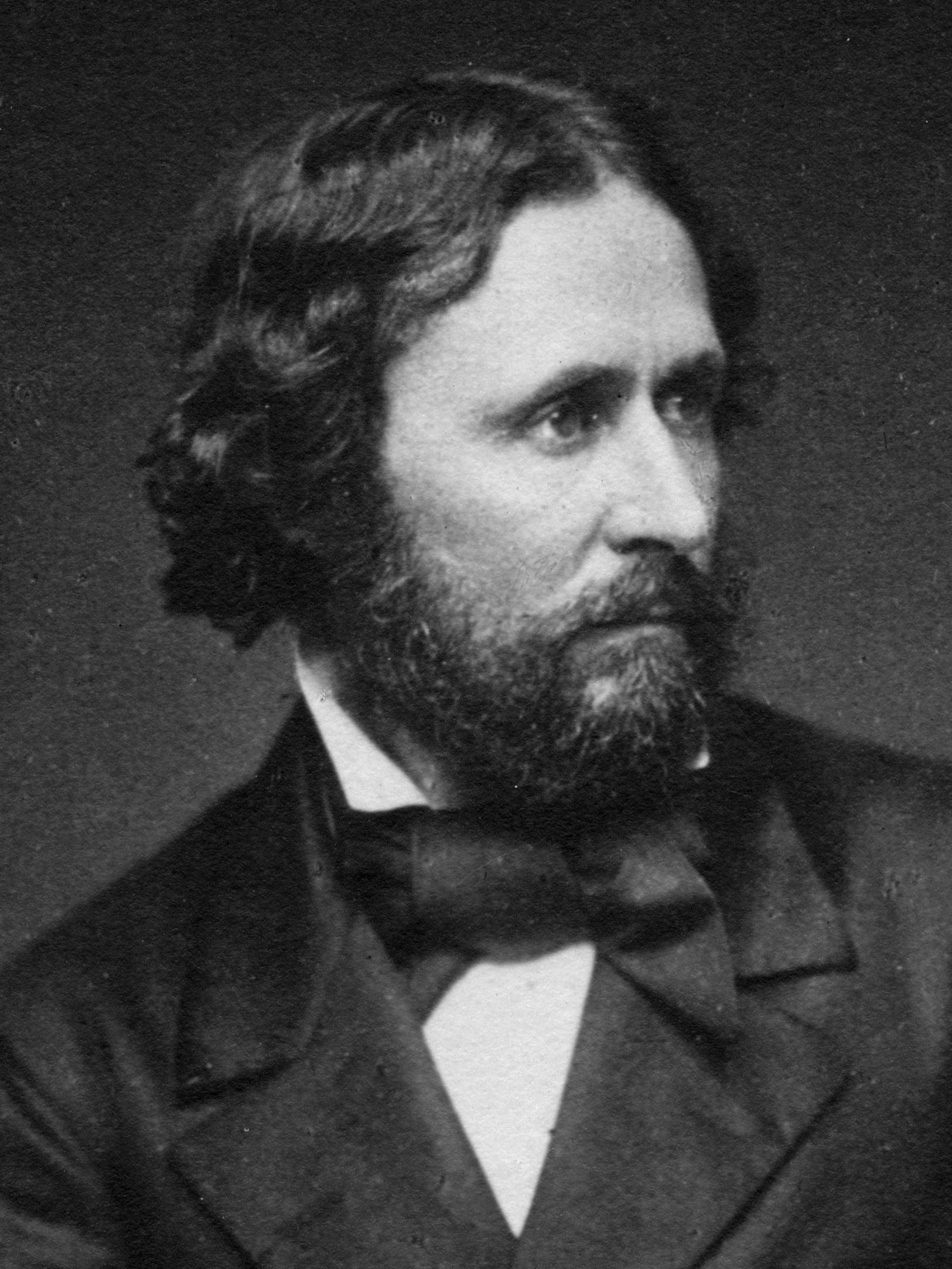

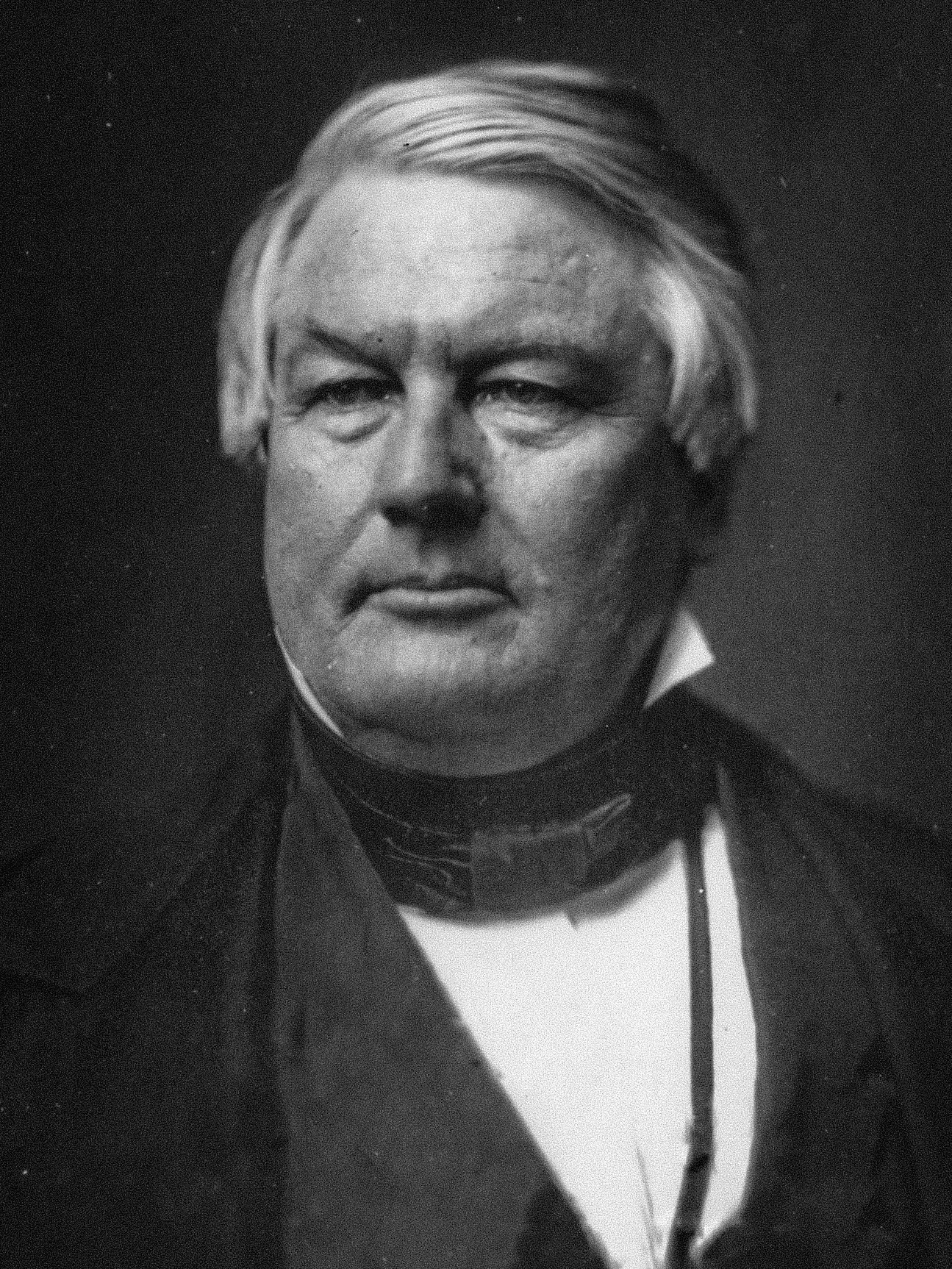
Nominee	James Buchanan	John C. Frémont	Millard Fillmore
Party	Democratic	Republican	Know Nothing
Home state	Pennsylvania	California	New York
Running mate	John C. Breckinridge	William L. Dayton	Andrew Jackson Donelson
Electoral vote	13	0	0
Popular vote	118,670	94,375	22,386
Percentage	50.41%	40.09%	9.51%

Buchanan
40–50%
50–60%
60–70%
70–80%
80–90%
Frémont
40–50%
50–60%
60–70%
70–80%
President before election
Franklin Pierce
Democratic
Elected President
James Buchanan
Democratic

A presidential election was held in Indiana on November 4, 1856, as part of the 1856 United States presidential election. The Democratic ticket of the U.S. minister to Great Britain James Buchanan and the former U.S. representative from Kentucky's 8th congressional district John C. Breckinridge defeated the Republican ticket of the former U.S. senator from California John C. Frémont and the former U.S. senator from New Jersey William L. Dayton by a margin of 10.3%. The Know Nothing ticket of former president Millard Fillmore and the former U.S. envoy to Prussia Andrew Jackson Donelson finished third. Buchanan defeated Frémont in the national election with 174 electoral votes.

== General election ==
=== Summary ===
Indiana chose 13 electors in a statewide general election. Nineteenth-century presidential elections used a form of block voting that allowed voters to modify the electoral list nominated by a political party before submitting their ballots. Because voters elected each member of the Electoral College individually, electors nominated by the same party often received differing numbers of votes as a consequence of voter rolloff, split-ticket voting, or electoral fusion. This table reflects the statewide popular vote as calculated by Michael J. Dubin.

1856 United States presidential election in Indiana
Party	Candidate	Votes	%	±%
Democratic	James Buchanan John C. Breckinridge	118,670	50.41	▼1.52
Republican	John C. Frémont William L. Dayton	94,375	40.09	▲40.09
Know Nothing	Millard Fillmore Andrew Jackson Donelson	22,386	9.51	▲9.51
Total votes		235,431	100.00	

=== Results by county ===
1856 United States presidential election in Indiana by county
County	James Buchanan Democratic		John C. Frémont Republican		Millard Fillmore Know Nothing		Total
County	Votes	%	Votes	%	Votes	%	Total
Adams	847	63.73%	413	31.08%	69	5.19%	1,329
Allen	3,211	64.88%	1,593	32.19%	145	2.93%	4,949
Bartholomew	1,844	56.25%	1,292	39.41%	142	4.33%	3,278
Benton	217	40.19%	315	58.33%	8	1.48%	540
Blackford	404	58.64%	238	34.54%	47	6.82%	689
Boone	1,493	51.97%	1,299	45.21%	81	2.82%	2,873
Brown	681	74.10%	148	16.10%	90	9.79%	919
Carroll	1,344	51.16%	1,261	48.00%	22	0.84%	2,627
Cass	1,539	49.92%	1,504	48.78%	40	1.30%	3,083
Clark	1,950	55.46%	492	13.99%	1,074	30.55%	3,516
Clay	1,108	62.63%	365	20.63%	296	16.73%	1,769
Clinton	1,364	51.30%	1,261	47.42%	34	1.28%	2,659
Crawford	735	57.97%	24	1.89%	509	40.14%	1,268
Daviess	1,115	53.61%	26	1.25%	939	45.14%	2,080
Dearborn	2,619	58.34%	1,573	35.04%	297	6.62%	4,489
Decatur	1,639	47.95%	1,718	50.26%	61	1.78%	3,418
DeKalb	1,247	51.55%	1,097	45.35%	75	3.10%	2,419
Delaware	992	35.94%	1,736	62.90%	32	1.16%	2,760
Dubois	1,191	82.25%	21	1.45%	236	16.30%	1,448
Elkhart	1,651	45.36%	1,971	54.15%	18	0.49%	3,640
Fayette	1,002	44.91%	1,189	53.29%	40	1.79%	2,231
Floyd	1,767	54.25%	228	7.00%	1,262	38.75%	3,257
Fountain	1,588	49.16%	1,606	49.72%	36	1.11%	3,230
Franklin	2,259	60.45%	1,437	38.45%	41	1.10%	3,737
Fulton	835	50.12%	822	49.34%	9	0.54%	1,666
Gibson	1,286	53.21%	365	15.10%	766	31.69%	2,417
Grant	1,035	40.93%	1,395	55.16%	99	3.91%	2,529
Greene	1,129	55.32%	379	18.57%	533	26.11%	2,041
Hamilton	1,185	39.89%	1,748	58.84%	38	1.28%	2,971
Hancock	1,343	57.66%	962	41.31%	24	1.03%	2,329
Harrison	1,681	54.63%	773	25.12%	623	20.25%	3,077
Hendricks	1,378	44.00%	1,680	53.64%	74	2.36%	3,132
Henry	1,229	30.58%	2,741	68.20%	49	1.22%	4,019
Howard	686	38.63%	1,057	59.52%	33	1.86%	1,776
Huntington	1,181	47.79%	1,232	49.86%	58	2.35%	2,471
Jackson	1,700	67.59%	299	11.89%	516	20.52%	2,515
Jasper	548	44.05%	633	50.88%	63	5.06%	1,244
Jay	880	48.43%	883	48.60%	54	2.97%	1,817
Jefferson	1,936	41.41%	2,314	49.50%	425	9.09%	4,675
Jennings	1,159	44.17%	1,293	49.28%	172	6.55%	2,624
Johnson	1,608	56.30%	1,095	38.34%	153	5.36%	2,856
Knox	1,512	58.06%	557	21.39%	535	20.55%	2,604
Kosciusko	1,075	39.09%	1,662	60.44%	13	0.47%	2,750
LaGrange	640	31.19%	1,406	68.52%	6	0.29%	2,052
Lake	346	27.20%	923	72.56%	3	0.24%	1,272
LaPorte	2,239	46.48%	2,533	52.58%	45	0.93%	4,817
Lawrence	1,126	49.69%	480	21.18%	660	29.13%	2,266
Madison	1,603	53.50%	1,309	43.69%	84	2.80%	2,996
Marion	3,738	48.93%	3,696	48.38%	205	2.68%	7,639
Marshall	1,039	52.85%	927	47.15%	0	0.00%	1,966
Martin	769	64.35%	76	6.36%	350	29.29%	1,195
Miami	1,513	51.45%	1,390	47.26%	38	1.29%	2,941
Monroe	1,191	57.23%	498	23.93%	392	18.84%	2,081
Montgomery	2,088	50.43%	1,910	46.14%	142	3.13%	4,140
Morgan	1,528	48.22%	1,573	49.64%	63	2.15%	3,164
Noble	1,198	47.86%	1,257	50.22%	48	1.92%	2,503
Ohio	505	51.11%	104	10.53%	379	38.36%	988
Orange	1,207	64.82%	49	2.63%	606	32.55%	1,862
Owen	1,239	53.59%	487	21.06%	586	25.35%	2,312
Parke	1,284	43.23%	1,494	50.30%	192	6.46%	2,970
Perry	1,066	59.42%	96	5.35%	632	35.23%	1,794
Pike	772	54.14%	80	5.61%	574	40.25%	1,426
Porter	614	41.74%	847	57.58%	10	0.68%	1,471
Posey	1,819	66.15%	306	11.13%	625	22.73%	2,750
Pulaski	557	60.22%	341	36.86%	27	2.92%	925
Putnam	1,882	51.56%	1,345	36.85%	423	11.59%	3,650
Randolph	1,253	37.36%	2,042	60.88%	59	1.76%	3,354
Ripley	1,661	50.80%	1,425	43.58%	184	5.63%	3,270
Rush	1,685	49.38%	1,644	48.18%	83	2.43%	3,412
St. Joseph	1,509	45.36%	1,812	54.46%	6	0.18%	3,327
Scott	693	56.11%	278	22.51%	264	21.38%	1,235
Shelby	2,075	55.67%	1,510	40.52%	142	3.81%	3,727
Spencer	1,260	54.71%	235	10.20%	808	35.08%	2,303
Starke	155	56.57%	112	40.88%	7	2.55%	274
Steuben	553	30.95%	1,215	67.99%	19	1.06%	1,787
Sullivan	1,650	71.61%	257	11.15%	397	17.23%	2,304
Switzerland	1,121	46.92%	228	9.54%	1,040	43.53%	2,389
Tippecanoe	2,307	44.97%	2,778	54.15%	45	0.88%	5,130
Tipton	738	56.86%	546	42.06%	14	1.08%	1,298
Union	710	47.59%	763	51.14%	19	1.27%	1,492
Vanderburgh	1,880	60.80%	372	12.03%	840	27.17%	3,092
Vermillion	824	46.55%	866	48.93%	80	4.52%	1,770
Vigo	1,808	46.89%	1,165	30.21%	883	22.90%	3,856
Wabash	1,096	36.67%	1,785	59.72%	108	3.61%	2,989
Warren	767	38.16%	1,167	58.06%	76	3.78%	2,010
Warrick	1,506	71.95%	107	5.11%	480	22.93%	2,093
Washington	1,778	63.50%	331	11.82%	691	24.68%	2,800
Wayne	1,958	34.08%	3,688	64.18%	100	1.74%	5,746
Wells	931	55.65%	726	43.40%	16	0.96%	1,673
White	746	50.03%	703	47.15%	42	2.82%	1,491
Whitley	851	49.91%	797	46.74%	57	3.34%	1,705
Totals	118,670	50.41%	94,376	40.09%	22,386	9.50%	235,401

== See also ==
- United States presidential elections in Indiana

== Bibliography ==
- "1856 Electoral College Results". National Archives.
- Dubin, Michael J. (2002). United States Presidential Elections, 1788-1860. Jefferson, NC: McFarland & Co. ISBN 978-0-7864-6422-7.
- Lampi, Philip J. (n.d.). "Electoral College". A New Nation Votes. American Antiquarian Society.
- Madison, James H. (1986). The Indiana Way: A State History. Bloomington: Indiana University Press.
- Ratcliffe, Donald J. (Spring 2014). "Popular Preferences in the Presidential Election of 1824". Journal of the Early Republic. 34 (1): 45–77. JSTOR 24486931.
