= 1912 United States presidential election in Indiana =

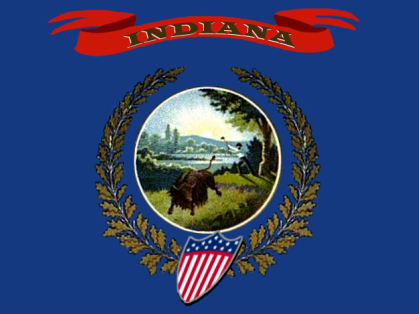
- November 5, 1912
- Turnout: 77.8% ▼12.1 pp
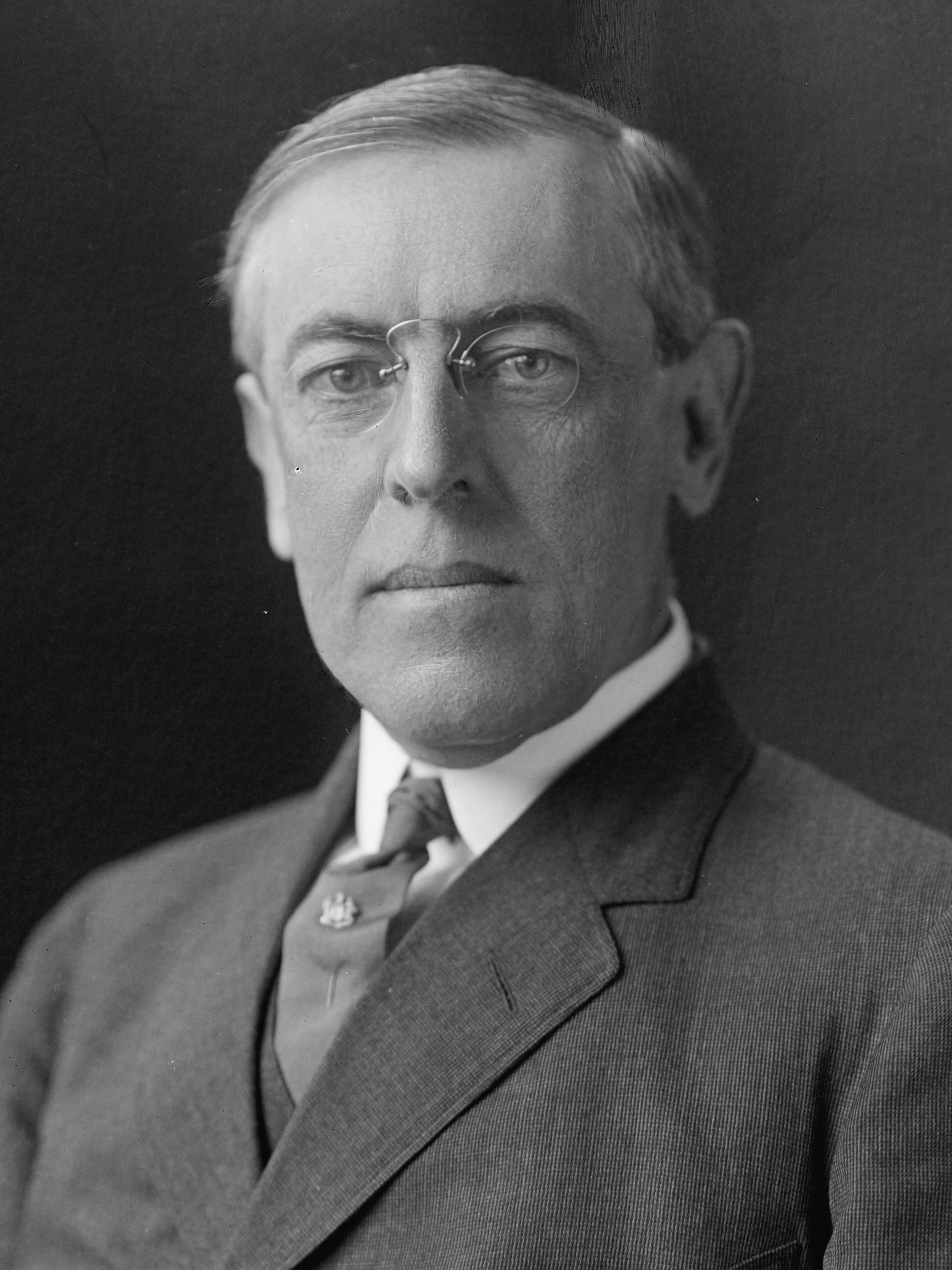

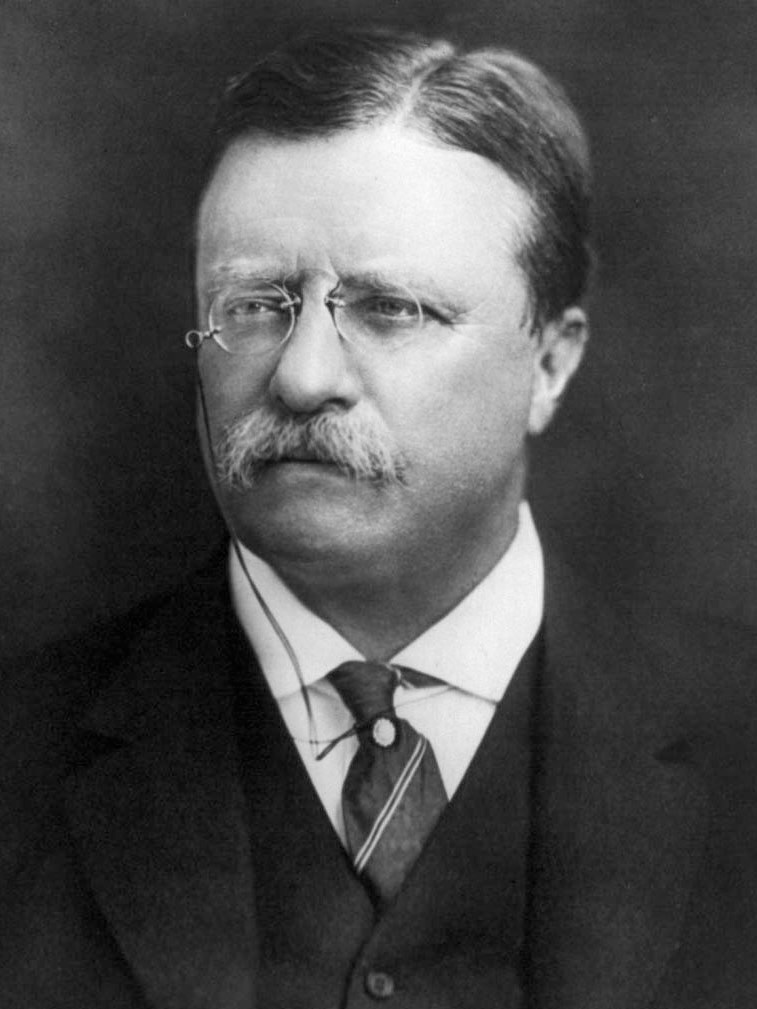

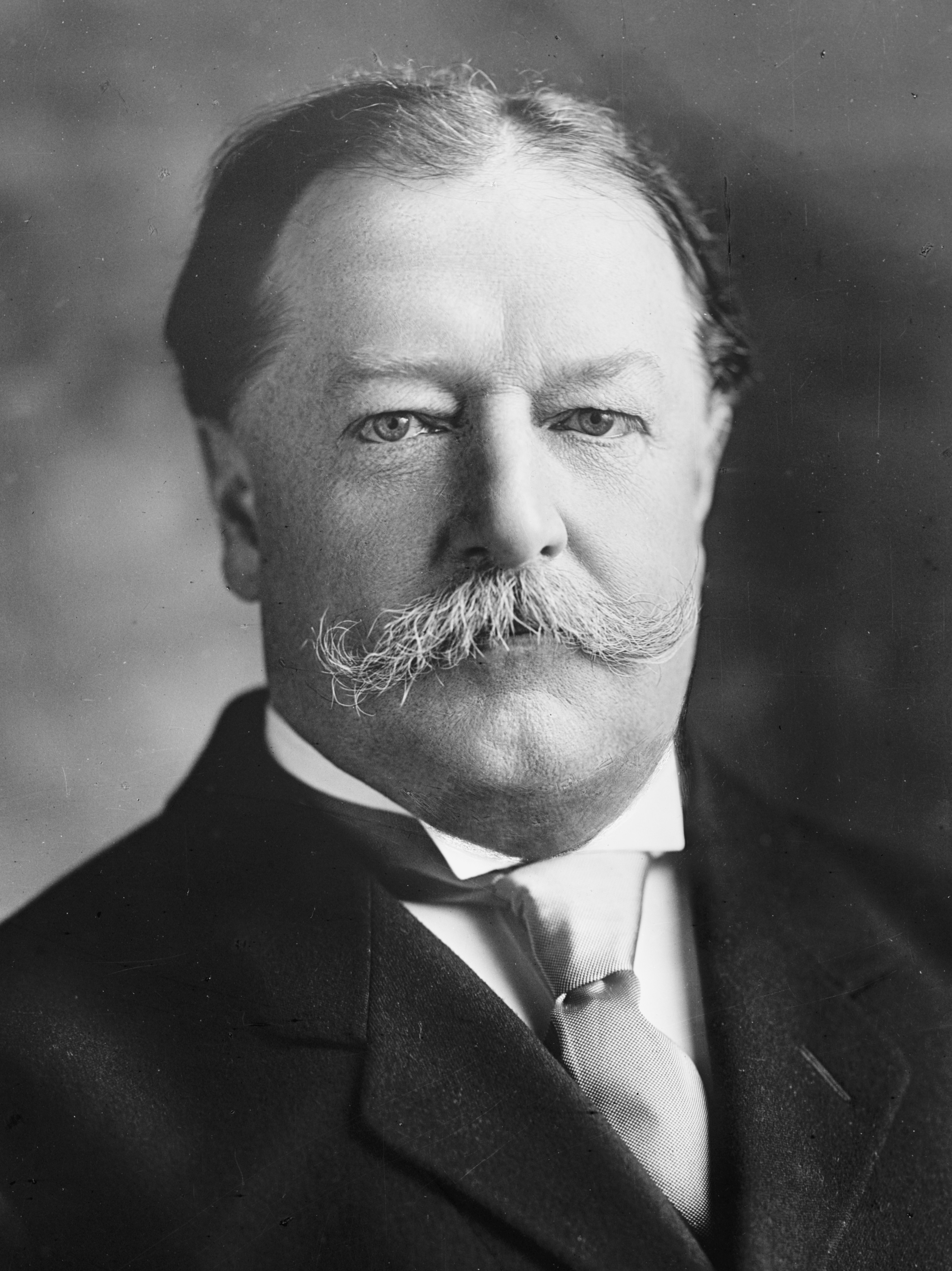

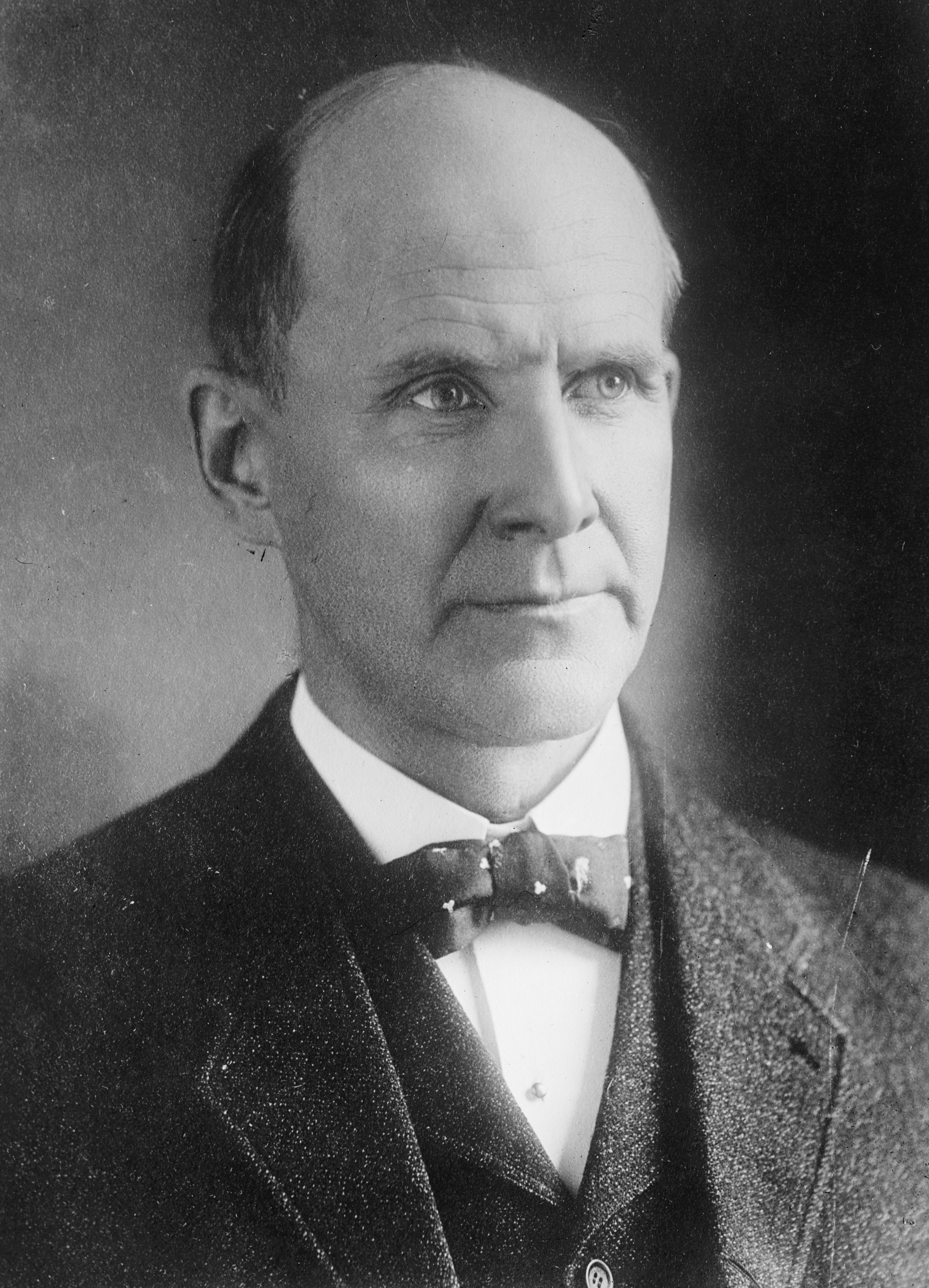
Nominee	Woodrow Wilson	Theodore Roosevelt
Party	Democratic	Progressive
Home state	New Jersey	New York
Running mate	Thomas R. Marshall	Hiram Johnson
Electoral vote	15	0
Popular vote	281,890	162,007
Percentage	43.07%	24.75%
Nominee	William Howard Taft	Eugene V. Debs
Party	Republican	Socialist
Home state	Ohio	Indiana
Running mate	Nicholas Murray Butler (Note: Replacing James S. Sherman.)	Emil Seidel
Electoral vote	0	0
Popular vote	151,267	36,931
Percentage	23.11%	5.64%
County results
Wilson
30–40%
40–50%
50–60%
60–70%
Roosevelt
30–40%
Taft
30–40%
40–50%
President before election
William Howard Taft
Republican
Elected President
Woodrow Wilson
Democratic

A presidential election was held in Indiana on November 5, 1912, as part of the 1912 United States presidential election. The Democratic ticket of the governor of New Jersey Woodrow Wilson and the governor of Indiana Thomas R. Marshall defeated the Progressive ticket of the former president of the United States Theodore Roosevelt and the governor of California Hiram Johnson. The Republican ticket of the incumbent president William Howard Taft and the president of Columbia University Nicholas Murray Butler finished third, and the Socialist ticket of the former member of the Indiana House of Representatives Eugene V. Debs and the mayor of Milwaukee, Wisconsin Emil Seidel finished fourth. Wilson defeated Roosevelt, Taft, and Debs in the national election with 435 electoral votes.

== General election ==
=== Statistics ===
Wilson became the first Democratic presidential candidate to carry Hamilton County, Indiana. As of 2024, this remains the only occasion on which Hamilton County voted for the Democratic ticket.

=== Results ===
Indiana chose 15 electors on a statewide general ticket. State law required voters to elect each member of the Electoral College individually, rather than as a group. This sometimes resulted in small differences in the number of votes cast for electors pledged to the same presidential candidate, if some voters did not vote for all the electors nominated by a party. The following table quotes the official returns published by the secretary of state of Indiana, which list the votes for the first elector on each ticket.

1912 United States presidential election in Indiana
Party	Candidate	Votes	%	±%
Democratic	Woodrow Wilson Thomas R. Marshall	281,890	43.07	▼3.84
Progressive	Theodore Roosevelt Hiram Johnson	162,007	24.75	▲24.75
Republican	William Howard Taft Nicholas Murray Butler	151,267	23.11	▼25.29
Socialist	Eugene V. Debs Emil Seidel	36,931	5.64	▲3.77
Prohibition	Eugene W. Chafin Aaron S. Watkins	19,249	2.94	▲0.44
Socialist Labor	Arthur Reimer August Gilhaus	3,130	0.48	▲0.39
Total votes		654,474	100.00	

=== Results by county ===
1912 United States presidential election in Indiana by county
County	Woodrow Wilson Democratic		Theodore Roosevelt Progressive		William H. Taft Republican		Eugene V. Debs Socialist		Others		Margin (Note: Difference of the Democratic vote and the Progressive vote, except where noted.)		Total
County	Votes	%	Votes	%	Votes	%	Votes	%	Votes	%	Votes	%	Total
Adams	2,961	61.62%	732	15.23%	917	19.08%	30	0.62%	165	3.43%	2,044 (Note: Difference of the Democratic vote and the Republican vote.)	42.54%	4,805
Allen	8,659	46.63%	4,246	22.87%	3,423	18.43%	1,512	8.14%	729	3.93%	4,413	23.77%	18,569
Bartholomew	3,147	48.26%	1,604	24.60%	1,321	20.26%	196	3.01%	253	3.88%	1,543	23.66%	6,521
Benton	1,425	42.09%	796	23.51%	1,030	30.42%	30	0.89%	105	3.10%	395	11.67%	3,386
Blackford	1,651	45.56%	1,163	32.09%	399	11.01%	256	7.06%	155	4.28%	488	13.47%	3,624
Boone	3,280	48.70%	2,014	29.90%	1,181	17.54%	90	1.34%	170	2.52%	1,266	18.80%	6,735
Brown	909	59.30%	253	16.50%	305	19.90%	12	0.78%	54	3.52%	604	39.40%	1,533
Carroll	2,275	46.59%	926	18.96%	1,467	30.04%	83	1.70%	132	2.70%	808	16.55%	4,883
Cass	4,421	46.48%	3,094	32.53%	1,573	16.54%	187	1.97%	236	2.48%	1,327	13.95%	9,511
Clark	3,315	48.93%	2,453	36.21%	805	11.88%	137	2.02%	65	0.96%	862	12.72%	6,775
Clay	3,297	45.12%	1,614	22.09%	1,494	20.45%	697	9.54%	205	2.81%	1,683	23.03%	7,307
Clinton	3,255	45.52%	1,281	17.92%	2,182	30.52%	219	3.06%	213	2.98%	1,073	15.01%	7,150
Crawford	1,159	43.33%	542	20.26%	663	24.79%	128	4.79%	183	6.84%	496	18.54%	2,675
Daviess	2,759	43.51%	1,061	16.73%	2,005	31.62%	327	5.16%	189	2.98%	754	11.89%	6,341
Dearborn	2,957	56.13%	701	13.31%	1,366	25.93%	146	2.77%	98	1.86%	1,591	30.20%	5,268
Decatur	2,246	43.44%	1,436	27.78%	1,263	24.43%	88	1.70%	137	2.65%	810	15.67%	5,170
DeKalb	2,766	44.53%	1,623	26.13%	1,125	18.11%	437	7.04%	260	4.19%	1,143	18.40%	6,211
Delaware	4,313	35.13%	4,059	33.06%	2,018	16.44%	1,199	9.77%	689	5.61%	254	2.07%	12,278
Dubois	3,059	68.01%	606	13.47%	666	14.81%	106	2.36%	61	1.36%	2,393	53.20%	4,498
Elkhart	4,300	37.22%	4,533	39.24%	1,199	10.38%	856	7.41%	665	5.76%	-233	-2.02%	11,553
Fayette	1,455	36.20%	1,214	30.21%	1,030	25.63%	231	5.75%	89	2.21%	241	6.00%	4,019
Floyd	3,236	46.66%	2,580	37.20%	669	9.65%	341	4.92%	110	1.59%	656	9.46%	6,936
Fountain	2,499	46.19%	1,067	19.72%	1,560	28.84%	140	2.59%	144	2.66%	939	17.36%	5,410
Franklin	2,306	58.00%	630	15.84%	929	23.36%	30	0.75%	81	2.04%	1,376	34.62%	3,976
Fulton	2,022	45.60%	694	15.65%	1,427	32.18%	70	1.58%	221	4.98%	595	13.42%	4,434
Gibson	3,250	44.44%	1,270	17.36%	2,266	30.98%	295	4.03%	233	3.19%	984	13.45%	7,314
Grant	4,390	33.68%	2,185	16.76%	3,939	30.22%	1,323	10.15%	1,199	9.20%	451	3.46%	13,036
Greene	3,373	39.28%	1,563	18.20%	2,156	25.11%	1,203	14.01%	291	3.39%	1,217	14.17%	8,586
Hamilton	2,463	34.93%	1,834	26.01%	2,247	31.86%	90	1.28%	418	5.93%	216	3.06%	7,052
Hancock	2,594	51.90%	1,375	27.51%	738	14.77%	133	2.66%	158	3.16%	1,219	24.39%	4,998
Harrison	2,106	47.34%	1,219	27.40%	900	20.23%	118	2.65%	106	2.38%	887	19.94%	4,449
Hendricks	2,372	43.10%	1,495	27.17%	1,439	26.15%	48	0.87%	149	2.71%	877	15.94%	5,503
Henry	2,687	34.82%	1,550	20.09%	2,479	32.12%	437	5.66%	564	7.31%	208	2.70%	7,717
Howard	2,824	31.95%	2,184	24.71%	2,152	24.35%	1,107	12.52%	572	6.47%	640	7.24%	8,839
Huntington	3,119	41.72%	1,586	21.21%	2,108	28.20%	252	3.37%	411	5.50%	1,011	13.52%	7,476
Jackson	3,225	56.91%	1,236	21.81%	921	16.25%	175	3.09%	110	1.94%	1,989	35.10%	5,667
Jasper	1,292	39.18%	694	21.04%	1,238	37.54%	14	0.42%	60	1.82%	54	1.64%	3,298
Jay	2,786	44.29%	1,596	25.37%	1,282	20.38%	218	3.47%	408	6.49%	1,190	18.92%	6,290
Jefferson	2,325	45.31%	943	18.38%	1,563	30.46%	137	2.67%	163	3.18%	762	14.85%	5,131
Jennings	1,577	44.69%	839	23.77%	955	27.06%	81	2.30%	77	2.18%	622	17.63%	3,529
Johnson	2,890	52.59%	1,408	25.62%	924	16.82%	49	0.89%	224	4.08%	1,482	26.97%	5,495
Knox	4,448	45.61%	1,316	13.49%	2,805	28.76%	892	9.15%	291	2.98%	1,643	16.85%	9,752
Kosciusko	2,817	39.02%	2,096	29.03%	1,767	24.47%	210	2.91%	330	4.57%	721	9.99%	7,220
LaGrange	1,233	35.11%	1,402	39.92%	758	21.58%	22	0.63%	97	2.76%	-169	-4.81%	3,512
Lake	5,136	29.38%	5,659	32.37%	5,176	29.61%	1,182	6.76%	330	1.89%	-483 (Note: Difference of the Progressive vote and the Republican vote.)	-2.76%	17,483
LaPorte	4,847	44.62%	2,749	25.31%	2,701	24.87%	397	3.65%	168	1.55%	2,098	19.32%	10,862
Lawrence	2,579	37.70%	2,106	30.79%	1,633	23.87%	398	5.82%	124	1.81%	473	6.92%	6,840
Madison	6,676	42.37%	4,751	30.15%	1,771	11.24%	1,947	12.36%	612	3.88%	1,925	12.22%	15,757
Marion	29,805	44.22%	18,396	27.29%	12,280	18.22%	5,268	7.82%	1,659	2.46%	11,409	16.93%	67,408
Marshall	2,859	48.31%	1,490	25.18%	1,196	20.21%	164	2.77%	209	3.53%	1,369	23.13%	5,918
Martin	1,440	47.68%	553	18.31%	975	32.28%	22	0.73%	30	0.99%	465	15.40%	3,020
Miami	3,366	44.92%	1,995	26.62%	1,426	19.03%	422	5.63%	285	3.80%	1,371	18.29%	7,494
Monroe	2,396	43.48%	1,497	27.16%	1,388	25.19%	84	1.52%	146	2.65%	899	16.31%	5,511
Montgomery	3,821	46.51%	1,246	15.17%	2,747	33.43%	173	2.11%	229	2.79%	1,074	13.07%	8,216
Morgan	2,608	46.70%	1,236	22.13%	1,353	24.23%	185	3.31%	202	3.62%	1,255	22.47%	5,584
Newton	965	36.92%	633	24.22%	892	34.12%	26	0.99%	98	3.75%	73	2.79%	2,614
Noble	2,888	45.81%	1,760	27.92%	1,443	22.89%	106	1.68%	107	1.70%	1,128	17.89%	6,304
Ohio	553	49.07%	120	10.65%	406	36.02%	9	0.80%	39	3.46%	147	13.04%	1,127
Orange	1,830	42.43%	849	19.68%	1,521	35.27%	53	1.23%	60	1.39%	309	7.16%	4,313
Owen	1,621	48.32%	784	23.37%	711	21.19%	161	4.80%	78	2.32%	837	24.95%	3,355
Parke	2,031	38.93%	684	13.11%	1,891	36.25%	346	6.63%	265	5.08%	140	2.68%	5,217
Perry	1,931	52.90%	1,130	30.96%	520	14.25%	34	0.93%	35	0.96%	801	21.95%	3,650
Pike	1,984	45.53%	489	11.22%	1,515	34.76%	298	6.84%	72	1.65%	469	10.76%	4,358
Porter	1,352	31.59%	1,241	29.00%	1,510	35.28%	120	2.80%	57	1.33%	-158	-3.69%	4,280
Posey	2,767	55.55%	745	14.96%	1,193	23.95%	132	2.65%	144	2.89%	1,574	31.60%	4,981
Pulaski	1,250	42.57%	586	19.96%	729	24.83%	135	4.60%	236	8.04%	521	17.75%	2,936
Putnam	2,922	52.70%	1,079	19.46%	1,354	24.42%	91	1.64%	99	1.79%	1,568	28.28%	5,545
Randolph	2,158	29.66%	2,471	33.97%	1,988	27.33%	272	3.74%	386	5.31%	-313	-4.30%	7,275
Ripley	2,431	47.95%	884	17.44%	1,492	29.43%	163	3.21%	100	1.97%	939	18.52%	5,070
Rush	2,312	41.39%	1,075	19.24%	1,931	34.57%	77	1.38%	191	3.42%	381	6.82%	5,586
St. Joseph	5,391	34.56%	5,240	33.59%	3,146	20.17%	1,285	8.24%	539	3.45%	151	0.97%	15,601
Scott	1,033	53.17%	531	27.33%	327	16.83%	18	0.93%	34	1.75%	502	25.84%	1,943
Shelby	3,432	47.47%	1,969	27.23%	1,254	17.34%	319	4.41%	256	3.54%	1,463	20.24%	7,230
Spencer	2,428	47.50%	1,142	22.34%	1,268	24.80%	151	2.95%	123	2.41%	1,160	22.69%	5,112
Starke	1,208	43.14%	696	24.86%	787	28.11%	54	1.93%	55	1.96%	421	15.04%	2,800
Steuben	1,266	31.74%	1,210	30.33%	1,290	32.34%	41	1.03%	182	4.56%	-24	-0.60%	3,989
Sullivan	3,707	48.82%	1,068	14.07%	1,406	18.52%	1,045	13.76%	367	4.83%	2,301	30.30%	7,593
Switzerland	1,342	49.93%	322	11.98%	882	32.81%	75	2.79%	67	2.49%	460	17.12%	2,688
Tippecanoe	4,442	41.70%	2,838	26.64%	3,006	28.22%	191	1.79%	176	1.65%	1,436	13.48%	10,653
Tipton	2,185	46.61%	914	19.50%	1,262	26.92%	113	4.56%	214	4.56	923	19.69%	4,688
Union	705	39.34%	342	19.08%	643	35.88%	38	2.12%	64	3.57%	62	3.46%	1,930
Vanderburgh	7,219	40.83%	2,738	15.48%	4,839	27.37%	2,572	14.55%	314	1.78%	2,380	13.46%	17,682
Vermillion	1,780	36.46%	680	13.93%	1,621	33.20%	550	11.27%	251	5.14%	159	3.26%	4,882
Vigo	7,256	40.18%	4,988	27.62%	3,103	17.18%	1,862	10.31%	851	4.71%	2,268	12.56%	18,060
Wabash	2,371	34.92%	2,432	35.82%	1,363	20.08%	308	4.54%	315	4.64%	-61	-0.90%	6,789
Warren	872	30.49%	695	24.30%	1,183	41.36%	46	1.61%	64	2.24%	-311	-10.87%	2,860
Warrick	2,218	43.84%	819	16.19%	1,421	28.09%	310	6.13%	291	5.75%	797	15.75%	5,059
Washington	2,233	53.31%	1,113	26.57%	712	17.00%	61	1.46%	70	1.67%	1,120	26.74%	4,189
Wayne	3,806	33.12%	4,457	38.79%	1,851	16.11%	1,032	8.98%	345	3.00%	-651	-5.67%	11,491
Wells	2,760	54.20%	1,080	21.21%	812	15.95%	132	2.59%	308	6.05%	1,680	32.99%	5,092
White	2,059	44.38%	822	17.72%	1,613	34.77%	41	0.88%	104	2.24%	446	9.61%	4,639
Whitley	2,206	48.96%	990	21.97%	1,082	24.01%	70	1.55%	158	3.51%	1,124	24.94%	4,506
TOTAL	281,890	43.07%	162,007	24.75%	151,267	23.11%	36,931	5.64%	22,379	3.42	119,883	18.32	654,474

== See also ==
- United States presidential elections in Indiana

== Bibliography ==
- Aasen, Adam (April 1, 2014). "An Uphill Battle". Current in Carmel.
- Ellingham, L. G. (1912). Biennial Report of L. G. Ellingham, Secretary of State of the State of Indiana [...]. Indianapolis.
- Indiana (1912). Election Laws of Indiana [...]. Indianapolis: State Board of Election Commissioners.
- Madison, James H. (1986). The Indiana Way: A State History. Bloomington: Indiana University Press.
- Petersen, Svend (1963). A Statistical History of the American Presidential Elections. New York: Frederick Ungar Publishing Company. LCCN 62-21786.
