= Walnut Grove, Hamilton County, Indiana =

Unincorporated community in Indiana, U.S.

Coordinates: 40°09′43″N 85°56′23″W

Walnut Grove is an unincorporated community in Hamilton County, Indiana, in the United States.

The community was likely named for a grove of walnut trees nearby.
