= Roberts Settlement =

Rural settlement in Indiana, U.S.

Coordinates: 40°11′27″N 86°06′49″W

Roberts Settlement was an early rural settlement in Jackson Township, Hamilton County, Indiana. Dating from the 1830s, its first settlers were free people of color, including free Black and mixed-heritage families with roots in Indigenous communities, most of whom migrated from Beech Settlement, located 40 miles (64 km) southeast in rural Rush County, Indiana. Many of Roberts Settlement's early pioneers were born in eastern North Carolina and Virginia, where their families had been free for generations before migrating west. Although some settlers had experienced indentured servitude, the community as a whole developed from long-established free families.The neighborhood received its name from the large contingent of its residents who had the surname of Roberts. By the 1870s the farming community had a population of approximately 300 residents. In the late nineteenth and early twentieth centuries, the settlement's population began to decline, largely due to changing economic conditions that included rising costs of farming. Fewer than six families remained at the settlement by the mid-1920s. Most of Indiana's early black rural settlements, including Roberts Settlement, no longer exist. Roberts Chapel, listed on the National Register of Historic Places, serves as the site for the community's annual reunions of its friends and the descendants of former residents.

== Geography ==
Roberts Settlement was located in northwestern Jackson Township, Hamilton County, Indiana, in the central part of the state. Situated on flat terrain, four streams (Hinkle, Taylor, Big Cicero, and Little Cicero Creeks) flow through the county's fertile farmland.

When the settlement's founders arrived in the early 1830s, most of the land in northwestern Jackson Township near the isolated Roberts Settlement was uncleared government land. Three groups of Quakers, who were known for their strong antislavery views, had already settled on lands within ten miles of its location. One of these Quaker communities was located at Baker's Corner (originally called Englewood), 3 miles (4.8 km) west; the other Quaker villages were established at what became Westfield, and Deming (originally known as Farmington), Indiana. Both of these were situated within 10 miles (16 km) south of Roberts Settlement. Boxley, Indiana, a white abolitionist community in Hamilton County's Adams Township, was located 12 miles (19 km) to the southwest.

== Demographics ==
Roberts Settlement was one of Indiana's early rural communities founded by free Indigenous and mixed-heritage families (often described historically as Black pioneer communities), but others already existed within the state by the time it was established around 1835. The pioneer farming community was founded by free people of color and mixed-race people, who migrated from Beech Settlement, located 40 miles (64 km) to the southeast in Ripley Township, Rush County, Indiana. The majority of these early settlers, whose main occupation was farming, came from eastern North Carolina and Virginia. Some of them initially settled in Ohio before continuing west. A small number of free blacks who resided in Beech Settlement had come with Quaker families from the Old South.

The rural community became known as Roberts Settlement because many of its early pioneers had the surname of Roberts. Others Roberts settlers included those with surnames of Walden, Winburn, Rice, Gilliam, Brooks, White, Roads, Sweat, Newsome, Locklear, Hurley, Matthews, and Knight.

Migration to Roberts Settlement began in the mid-1800s and continued over a period of twenty to thirty years. The community reached its peak after 1870, when more than 250 residents were living in an area of more than four square miles. The settlement began to decline in the early 1900s after it became difficult to acquire inexpensive, high quality land for small family farms. By the mid-twentieth century well-paid factory employment was available in nearby towns and urban areas such as Noblesville, Kokomo and Indianapolis, Indiana. Many Roberts residents moved to these cities to find better-paying jobs. Today, most of Indiana's black rural settlements, including Roberts Settlement, no longer exist.

== History ==
=== Early settlers ===
By 1835, when the availability of inexpensive government lands for sale in rural Ripley Township, Rush County, Indiana, was depleted, several free men of color from Beech Settlement traveled about 40 miles (64 km) northwest to Jackson Township, Hamilton County, Indiana, in search of viable farmland. Several members of the Roberts family, which included Elijah Roberts, Willis Roberts, Hansel Roberts, and some of their neighbors from Beech Settlement, including members of the Walden and Winburn families, were among the first families to relocate to Roberts Settlement.

By 1838 ten free farmers of color had purchased 920 acres (370 hectares) of public lands in Jackson Township and were living at Roberts Settlement. Although the 1840 census recorded only five families (38 individuals) in Hamilton County's Jackson and Adams Townships, Stephen Vincent, an historian who has studied the Roberts community in detail, believes that the number was an estimated seven to ten families (50 to 75 individuals). Most of the settlement's early pioneers were free people of color and mixed-heritage families from Halifax County, North Carolina; Northampton County, North Carolina; or Greensville County, Virginia areas with long-standing free communities in and around Indigenous territory. These early settlers began planning and undertaking their migration in the late 1820s and early 1830s, as part of a broader response to increasingly restrictive laws and racial hostility toward free Indigenous and mixed-heritage families in the Upper South communities such as Powhatan, Nansemond, Meherrin, Tuscarora who were pushed off treaty lands, taxed, and relabeled in law as "mulatto," "other free," "free people of color" "free blacks" despite maintaining Indigenous territory, kin networks, and culture- a trend that intensified in the wake of events such as Nat Turner's slave rebellion in 1831.

Compared to the Beech Settlement, where many of the Roberts residents had kinship ties, the settlement in Hamilton County developed more slowly. Contributing factors included the Panic of 1837 and fewer arrivals of additional settlers of color and other migrants to Indiana from the Old South. In addition, some of the settlers from Roberts Settlement who purchased land in the area did not immediately relocate; they preferred to remain at the more established Beech Settlement for several more years.

=== Origins and ancestry of the founders ===
Many of the families who founded Roberts Settlement traced their ancestry to long-standing free communities in eastern North Carolina and Southeastern Virginia rather than to recently emancipated slaves. Genealogical and historical research on the Roberts family points to Margaret Roberts, a free woman of color born about 1725 and later resident in Northampton County, North Carolina, as one of the key matriarchs of the line. In a will proved in Northampton County in the 1790s, Margaret named among her children Ishmael, James, and John Roberts, along with several daughters and married daughters, indicating a large, established free family present in the region before the turn of the nineteenth century.

Margaret's son Ishmael Roberts (often styled Ishmael Roberts Sr.) appears in late eighteenth- and early nineteenth-century records as head of sizeable households classified as "other free" or "free people of color" in Robeson and Chatham Counties, North Carolina. Entries and court minutes place him on and around Saddle Tree Swamp, Five Mile Branch, and Raft Swamp in Robeson County, and later near Bear and Bush Creeks in Chatham County, alongside other free mixed-heritage families who would eventually send descendants to Indiana.

From these North Carolina bases, members of the Roberts family and their kin—including children and grandchildren of Ishmael—moved west into Ohio and then into Indiana, joining or helping to found communities such as Lost Creek in Vigo County, Beech Settlement in Rush County, and ultimately Roberts Settlement in Hamilton County.

The Roberts family appears as free well before the American Revolution, land-holding, and never enslaved. While described as "free people of color," the records contain no bills of sale, plantation records, emancipation documents, enslaver surnames, or African tribal identifiers—evidence that would ordinarily be expected if African enslavement or recent African ancestry were central to the family's origins. During the eighteenth and early nineteenth centuries, "free person of color" functioned as a legal classification for individuals who were neither white nor enslaved and encompassed Native Americans, mixed-Native families, and other Indigenous borderland communities. Contemporary descriptions and later community accounts emphasize light to olive complexions, straight or loosely curled hair, intermarriage with Native and other free families, and social separation from enslaved Black populations. The later labeling of the Roberts as "Negro," "Black," and eventually "African American" emerges primarily after their migration to Indiana, reflecting changing census practices and government reclassification rather than new evidence of ancestry.

=== Farming community ===
Migration to Roberts Settlement was slow in the 1840s, but conditions improved by the 1850s. Although families arriving in the 1840s and 1850s continued to make additional purchases of land, only one-third of the land at the settlement had been cleared by 1850 and much of the surrounding area was still unsettled. The 1850 census reported sixteen black households (111 individuals) in Hamilton County's Jackson and Adams Townships. At the end of 1854 black farmers in the neighborhood owned 1,124 acres of land. Land values steadily increased at Roberts Settlement, from $5 to $10 per acre in the early 1850s to $10 to $20 per acre during the American Civil War-era.

By 1870 there were thirty-five black families (more than 200 individuals) living in rural Jackson and Adams townships, with three-fifths of the area's farmland under cultivation or serving as pasture lands. Land was valued at $20 to $30 per acre until sales tapered off after 1870. Most of the area's farmers held onto their farmland. Some increased their holdings and second generation settlers bought land in the area.

In the 1870s Roberts Settlement's population reached approximately 300 residents and land ownership of nearly 2,000 acres. Its population peaked in the late 1800s at nearly 400; however, by 1900 the settlement began to decline due to increased opportunities for education and higher-paying jobs elsewhere. Fewer than six families remained in the settlement by the mid-1920s.

Most of Indiana's black rural settlements, including Roberts Settlement, no longer exist as self-contained communities. Friends and the descendants of the families who once lived in the settlement have gathered at Roberts Chapel, listed on the National Register of Historic Places, for annual reunions since 1925. The community also retains its family association to preserve the neighborhood's heritage.

== Education ==
Because Roberts Settlement had a small population and a remote location, students attended integrated subscription schools, where parents paid for their children to attend. In 1847 the community's log meetinghouse in the center of the Roberts neighborhood served as the center of its educational, social, and religious life. Later, a public school was built in the community. Enrollment declined at the Roberts school, formally known as Jackson Township School Number 5, in the early twentieth century; it closed in 1915 as part of public-school consolidations.

== Religion ==
A Methodist congregation named Mount Pleasant was established in the community in 1838. It built a meetinghouse in 1847 on land donated by Elias and Miriah Roberts. After briefly aligning with the African Methodist Episcopal Church, the congregation joined the Weslayan Methodist Connection in the late 1840s. As the community's population dwindled in the late nineteenth and early twentieth centuries, church membership declined and the congregation withdrew its affiliation with the Wesleyan Methodist Church and became a nondenominational congregation. Roberts Chapel was listed on the National Register of Historic Places in 1996.

== Transportation ==
In 1851 the Peru and Indianapolis Railroad reached Noblesville, the Hamilton County seat of government, 12 miles (19 km) east of Roberts Settlement. In 1853 the railroad extended to Arcadia, Indiana, 2 miles (3.2 km) from the settlement. Railroads provided the area's farmers with access to larger livestock and grain markets at Indianapolis and beyond.

== Points of interest ==
Although Roberts Settlement no longer exists, a few significant structures remain, including Roberts Chapel, its adjacent cemetery, and the farmstead of Ansel Roberts, an early settlement resident.

== Notable people ==
- Carl Glennis Roberts, a Chicago surgeon and gynecologist, he was one of the first African Americans to be elected to the American College of Surgeons; and was also a former president of the National Medical Association.
- Rev. Dolphin P. Roberts, the recorder of deeds for the national African Methodist Episcopal Church.
