= Beech Settlement =

Rural settlement in Indiana, U.S.

Coordinates: 39.761256°N 85.579149°W

Beech Settlement was a rural settlement in Ripley Township, Rush County, Indiana. Its early settlers were free people of color (most of them migrated from eastern North Carolina and Virginia) and a small number of free blacks, who came to the area with Quakers. Beech was one of Indiana's early black rural settlements and also one of its largest. The rural neighborhood received its name because of a large stand of beech trees in its vicinity. By 1835 the farming community had a population of 400 residents, but largely due to changing economic conditions, including rising costs of farming, the settlement's population began to decline after 1870. Fewer than six of the Beech families remained by 1920. As with most of Indiana's black rural settlements, Beech Settlement no longer exists. Few major points of interest remain; however, the community's Mount Pleasant Beech Church serves as the site for annual reunions of its friends and the descendants of former residents.

== Geography ==
Beech Settlement was located in Ripley Township, Rush County, Indiana, in the east-central part of the state. The settlement is situated near the Blue River, which flows through Ripley Township in the northwestern corner of Rush County. Quakers, who were known for their strong, antislavery views, began to settle in Ripley Township around 1818–20, and Beech Settlement, whose first settlers arrived in the late 1820s, was established northwest of the small, Quaker village that became known as Carthage, Indiana. When Beech's early settlers first arrived, the rich, fertile soil was covered by a heavily timbered forest, which they cleared and used the land to grow crops and raise livestock.

Beech Settlement, initially known as Blue River, is named in reference to Beech School, which was built in a grove of beech trees that once stood in the community.

== Demographics ==
Beech Settlement became one of Indiana's largest early black pioneer communities by the mid-1830s, when the total black population of Ripley Township reached nearly 400 people. The majority of Beech Settlement's early pioneers, whose main occupation was farming, were free people of color who had arrived by 1835 from eastern North Carolina and Virginia. Some of them initially settled in Ohio, before continuing west to purchase the inexpensive governments lands in Rush County, Indiana. A small number of free blacks in the settlement had come with Quaker families from the Old South.

By 1850 Ripley Township's black population had declined to 349 persons. In subsequent decades the trend continued, especially after 1870, when only 268 African Americans remained in the neighborhood. Fewer than six Beech families remained by 1920. Most of Indiana's black rural settlements, including Beech Settlement, no longer exist.

== History ==
=== Early settlers ===
Beech Settlement's first pioneer families arrived in the late 1820s. Most of them were free blacks and mixed-race people from North Carolina and Virginia who migrated west due to more oppressive government acts against free blacks following Nat Turner's slave rebellion in 1831. They settled in the unclaimed government lands in northwest Rush County, Indiana. By 1830 fourteen black families (91 individuals) were living in Ripley Township; by the mid-1830s most of the township's early black population of nearly 400 people had already arrived.

Many members of the Beech community were connected through kinship and friendship ties to families in North Carolina and Virginia. Among the earliest to arrive in what became Beech Settlement were the Roberts, Jeffries, Watkins, and Winslow families. Several members of the Roberts family migrated west at different times from the 1820s into the 1840s, but those who came in the mid-1820s were part of the great migration from North Carolina, Virginia, and Maryland.

Elijah Roberts migrated from Northampton County, North Carolina, to western Ohio in 1825. By 1830 he and some of his relatives, including brothers Anthony, James D., and John Sr., were living in Ripley Township, Indiana, where they had purchased government lands and formed Beech Settlement. Willis Roberts, who was also among the community's early settlers, purchased 160 acres (65 hectares) in 1830; about six months later, his cousin, Anthony Roberts (Elijah's brother), claimed 80 acres (32 hectares); and within a year the Beech community could claim additional property owners. Others such as the David Winslow family migrated to the settlement from Randolph County, North Carolina, around 1833–34. Sterling Watkins [Wadkins], another early pioneer, migrated from Greensville County, Virginia, and established his family at Beech Settlement, where he became one of its wealthiest landowners. Other surnames of Beech Settlement's early residents included Jeffries, Jones, Archey, Hill, Walden, Winburn, Brooks, Tootle, Bobson, Moss, Cary, Lassiter, Watkins, and Davis, among others.

By the end of 1833, eighteen blacks had purchased 1,563 acres in the area that became known as Beech Settlement. Quaker settlers who arrived earlier had already acquired most of the desirable land, so the later arrivals purchased less-desirable property on poorly drained soil, although it was still fertile. The final purchase of inexpensive government lands in the vicinity of Beech Settlement occurred in 1833–34.

In 1835 Elijah Roberts, Willis Roberts, Hansel Roberts, and Micajah Walden journeyed with other Beech men about 40 miles (64 km) northwest to Hamilton County, Indiana, in search of new lands. Elijah and Hansel Roberts and Micajah Walden made an initial purchase of 400 acres (160 hectares) of land in Hamilton County's Jackson Township. They were among the founders of what became known as Roberts Settlement. Within a year the men's families had moved to the new Hamilton County settlement to join them.

=== Farming community ===
In 1840 Ripley Township's black farmers owned a total of 1,843 acres of land, most of it in Beech Settlement. Its largest landowners in the 1840s were Daniel Watkins, who owned 320 acres (130 hectares); Willis Roberts, 190 acres (77 hectares); and Macklin and Walker Jeffries, 120 acres (49 hectares) each. Smaller homesteads in the settlement ranged from 40 acres (16 hectares) to 80 acres (32 hectares). Land values also increased from $1.25 in the 1820s and early 1830s to approximately $5 per acre in the mid-to late 1830s. By 1850 Beech's black farmers owned approximately 2,144 acres (868 hectares) of land.

In the 1860s Beech Settlement's population and land ownership began to shift as some of its residents began to retire or died, leaving their lands to other owners. Changes in the farm economy, such as the rising cost of farmland (from $20 an acre in 1850 to $50 an acre in 1870), a decline in prices for agricultural production, and increased costs of mechanized farming favored the larger landowners. Smaller family farms at Beech Settlement that were less prosperous were sold and their former owners moved away. Beech's landless farm laborers looked for work elsewhere. During the American Civil War several of the community's men served in the Union army, the majority of them in the 28th Regiment U.S. Colored Troops and the XXV Corps. By 1870 only 268 African Americans remained in the neighborhood, with Beech's black landholders holding a total of 2,500 acres (1,000 hectares).

Between 1870 and 1900 the black landowners' total acreage in Beech Settlement declined along with its population. Only twenty African American families remained by 1900; eighteen of them landholders who held a total of 900 acres (360 hectares). Only six Beech residents held farms of 40 acres (16 hectares) or more, the remainder were farming a few acres or rented land from others.

By the early 1900s the community's population had significantly diminished, primarily due to the increasing costs of farming and the migration of the settlers' descendants to larger cities and towns to find better-paying jobs. When the Beech community's school and church closed between 1900 and 1910, the settlement no longer functioned as a farming community. Fewer than six Beech families remained by 1920. Sanford Hill, the last African American farming in Ripley Township, died in 1955. Beech's friends and the descendants of its former residents hold annual reunions.

== Education ==
As with many of Indiana's black rural settlements, educational opportunities were important to its rural residents but limited. Beech children attended subscription schools (parents paid for their children to attend) in the settlement's meetinghouses or at nearby Quakers schools. Beech School was built approximately 1 mile (1.6 km) west of Mount Pleasant Beech Church. The school and church became a central part of the Beech community.

Beech settlers also formed Mount Pleasant Library, established as a subscription library in 1842 in the Mount Pleasant Beech Church meetinghouse. Beech community members and residents of nearby Carthage initially paid $.25 to $1.50 for the use of the library's small collection of books. The library remained in operation from 1842 until 1869.

== Religion ==
Members of Beech Settlement formed Baptist and Methodist Episcopal Church congregations. The Baptist congregations no longer exist, but the latter became an African Methodist Episcopal Church (AME) congregation in 1840. Mount Pleasant Beech Church, also known as the Old Beech Church, initially formed in 1832; it was the birthplace of the Indiana Conference of the AME Church, which organized and held its first annual meeting at Blue River, Indiana, on October 2, 1840. The Mount Pleasant Beech Church meetinghouse has served as the site for the community's annual reunions since 1914.

== Transportation ==
The arrival of railroads provided Beech settlers with wider access to markets beyond Ripley Township. The Knightstown and Shelbyville Railroad was completed in 1850. Local roads provided Beech Settlement with access to its depots at Knightstown, 2 miles (3.2 km) northeast, and Carthage, 1 mile (1.6 km) southeast. The Indiana Central, which began its service to the area in 1853, had depots at Knightstown and at Charlottesville, about 2 miles (3.2 km) northwest of the settlement.

== Points of interest ==
Although Beech Settlement no longer exists, a few significant structures remain, including Mount Pleasant Beech Church, built c. 1840, and the Walker Jeffries homestead, c. 1850.

== Notable people ==
- Robert Alpheus Roberts served as principal of Lincoln High School in Quincy, Illinois, for twenty-two years.
- Daniel W. Roberts became a physician at Saint Augustine, Florida, and was honored for his assistance during the influenza pandemic of 1918.
- Birney Watkins became a business leader and politician in Kansas City, Missouri.
