= Lynching of William Keemer =

Lynching of a Black man in Indiana

William Keemer was the victim of a racial terror spectacle lynching in 1875 in Greenfield, Indiana. Keemer, a Black man, was dragged from his jail cell in Hancock County, Indiana on June 25, 1875, by a white mob from Hancock, Shelby, and Rush counties. Keemer was hanged at the Hancock County fairgrounds and over 1,000 people traveled to view the body. Keemer was arrested on June 24 for an alleged sexual assault against a white woman in Carthage, Indiana. No trial was held for the alleged crime and William Keemer remains innocent. In 2021 a historical marker commemorating the anti-Black violence committed against Keemer was approved by the Indiana Historical Bureau.

== Life ==
William Keemer was born around 1852. The location is unknown, but he had a brother, James, who was born in 1850 in Ohio. According to James' death certificate, their parents were born in Kentucky and his mother's maiden name was Flood. Keemer's father, James H. Keemer, served in the Civil War from 1865 to 1866 and was a resident of the Beech Settlement, an early Black rural community, in Carthage, Indiana. William Keemer was also a resident of the Beech Settlement and by the time of his death, the population there was declining. William worked as a carpenter for Charles S. Wiltsie, who was the prosecuting attorney for Marion County, Indiana. In 1875, William was not known to have any children.

== Lynching ==
William Keemer was lynched on the night of June 25, 1875. A mob of 150 to 160 white, masked individuals gathered outside the Hancock County Jail in Greenfield, that evening, demanding a spectacle lynching. The mob restrained the sheriff in order to force entry into the jail and met resistance from Keemer. The mob then took Keemer from his jail cell to the Hancock County fairground where they hanged him from a structure. His body remained there until the morning of June 26. On Keemer's back, a note was found that read, "It is the verdict of 160 men of Hancock, Shelby and Rush, that this life is inadequate to meet the demands of justice." Keemer's body was taken to the Wills and Pratt, a funeral parlor, with the noose still around his neck. Over 1,000 people came to view the body. On Sunday, June 27, Keemer's body was buried in an unmarked grave in a potter's field.

On June 24, 1875, William Keemer was alleged to have raped Jerusha Vaughn, in some sources referred to as Lucetta, at her home in Blue River Township, Carthage, Indiana according to accusations from her husband, William Vaughn. That same day, local residents captured and took Keemer to the Rush County Jail whereupon a mob gathered who called for his death. Keemer was transferred the next day to the Hancock County Jail.

In Indiana, between 1877 and 1950, there were at least eighteen black people lynched.

== Aftermath ==
There was never a trial for the alleged rape, Keemer maintained his innocence until his death and there is no evidence that Jerusha Vaughn was a victim. William Vaughn ran for sheriff as a Democratic candidate after Keemer's murder. As late as 1911 James Keemer was known to still be searching for members of the white mob who murdered his brother.

A 1919 biography of Indiana poet James Whitcomb Riley alleged that Riley, working for his father's law office in Greenfield in the summer of 1875, saw Keemer's body at the fairgrounds the day after the lynching.

== Remembrance ==
In 2021 the Indiana State Historical Bureau approved a memorial plaque acknowledging Keemer's lynching to be placed at the site of his burial. The marker will be dedicated on August 24, 2024.
