= Roberts Chapel (Atlanta, Indiana) =

Historic church in Indiana, United States

- U.S. National Register of Historic Places
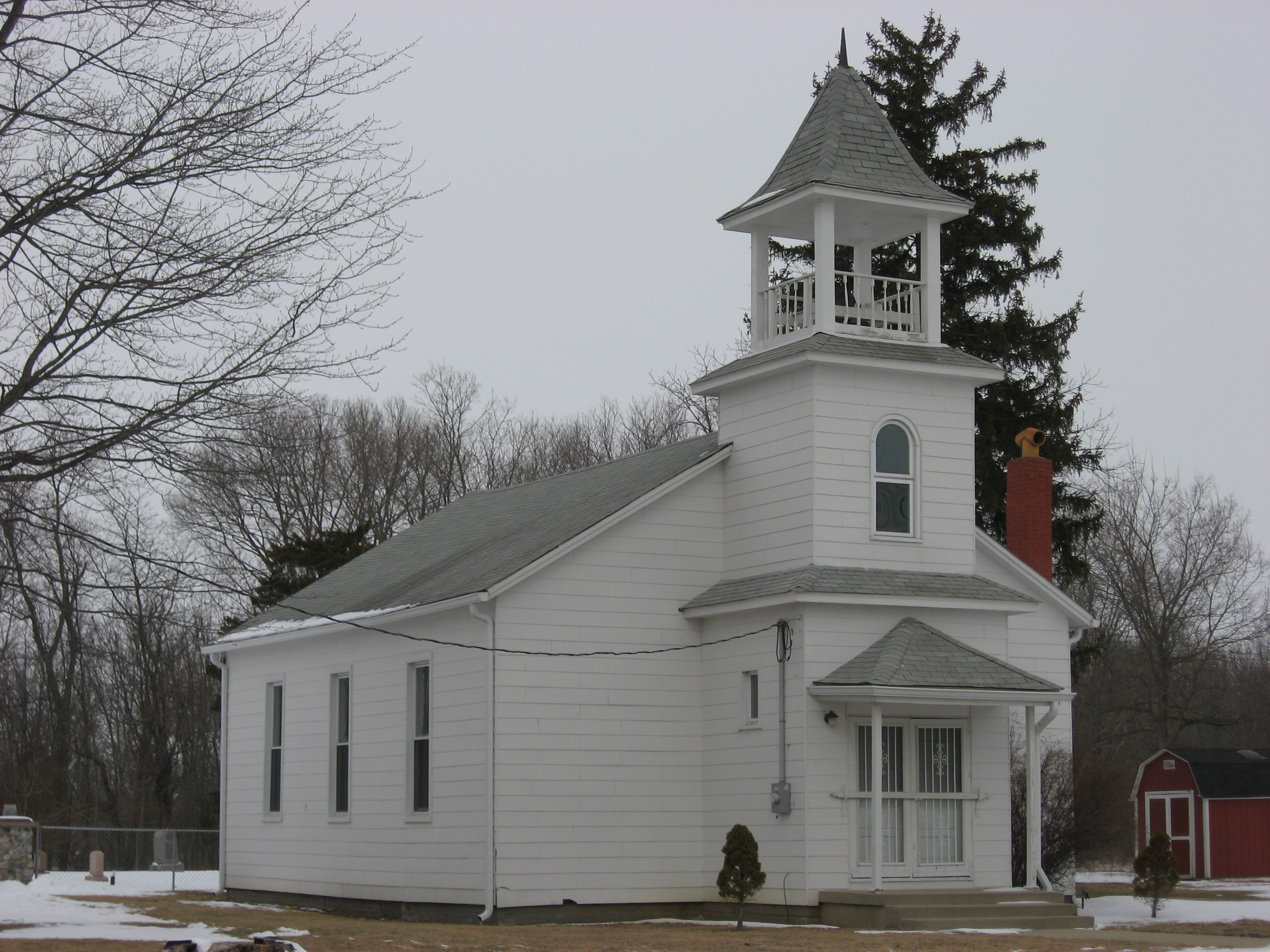
- Front and western side of the church

- Location within Indiana Location within the United States
- Location: 3102 E. 276th St., southwest of Atlanta, in Jackson Township, Hamilton County, Indiana
- Coordinates: 40°11′26″N 86°6′50″W
- Area: 1 acre (0.40 ha)
- Built: 1847
- Architect: Peter Walden; Alf Robbins
- Architectural style: gable front
- NRHP reference No.: 96001009
- Added to NRHP: September 25, 1996

Roberts Chapel, is a non-denominational church that was originally built in 1847 at Roberts Settlement, one of Indiana's early black pioneer communities. The rural church, whose main building dates from 1858, is located near the present-day town of Atlanta in rural Jackson Township, Hamilton County, Indiana. The chapel was listed on the National Register of Historic Places in 1996.

== History ==
Roberts Chapel originated as a Methodist congregation named Mount Pleasant, which was established in 1838 at Roberts Settlement in rural northwestern Jackson Township, Hamilton County, Indiana. The rural farming community was named in reference to the large contingent of residents who had the surname of Roberts. Most of its settlers were free blacks and mixed-race people who migrated from Beech Settlement in Ripley Township, Rush County, Indiana. The majority of these early pioneers had migrated to Indiana from eastern North Carolina and Virginia due to more oppressive government acts against free blacks following Nat Turner's Rebellion in 1831. Some of them initially settled in Ohio, before continuing west. A small number of free blacks who resided in Beech Settlement had come with Quaker families from the Old South. Other early settlers were ex-slaves.

The settlement's Methodist congregation built a log meetinghouse in 1847 on land donated by Elias and Mariah Roberts. Located in the center of the Roberts neighborhood, the meetinghouse served as the center of the community's educational, social, and religious life. After briefly aligning with the African Methodist Episcopal Church, the congregation joined the Wesleyan Methodist Connection in the late 1840s. The main portion of the present chapel was constructed in 1858.

Roberts Settlement's population peaked in the late 1800s at nearly 400 individuals; however, by 1900 the neighborhood began to decline. Fewer than six families remained by the mid-1920s. As its membership declined, the congregation withdrew its affiliation with the Wesleyan Methodist Church and became a non-denominational congregation.

Roberts Settlement no longer exists as a self-contained community. The chapel and its adjacent cemetery are among the few significant structures that remain. Friends and the descendants of the families who once lived in the settlement have gathered at the chapel for annual reunions since 1925. The community also retains its family association to preserve the neighborhood's heritage. There is now a walk-through exhibit with plaques chronicling two centuries of the settlement history. Roberts Chapel was listed on the National Register of Historic Places in 1996.

== Description ==
The main portion of the chapel, which has a gable façade, was constructed in 1858; a three-story belfry was added in 1916. The cemetery located north of the church was laid out in 1831; the first burial occurred there in 1843.
