= Sterling Weatherford =

American football player (born 1999)

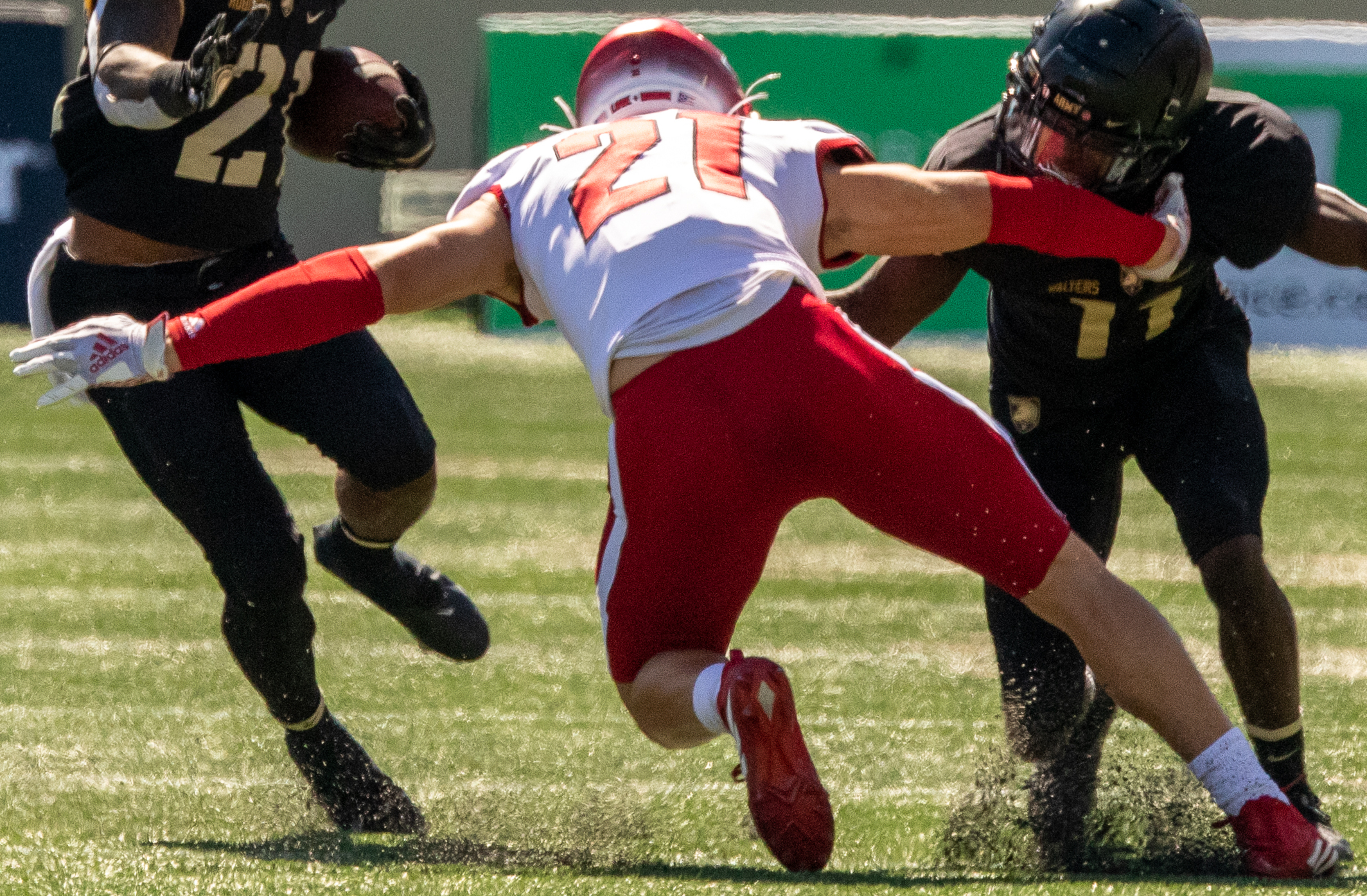
- Weatherford with Miami in 2021

No. 50, 55
- Position: Linebacker

Personal information
- Born: January 26, 1999 (age 27); Cicero, Indiana, U.S.
- Listed height: 6 ft 4 in (1.93 m)
- Listed weight: 224 lb (102 kg)

Career information
- High school: Hamilton Heights (Arcadia, Indiana)
- College: Miami (OH)
- NFL draft: 2022: undrafted

Career history
- Indianapolis Colts (2022)*; Chicago Bears (2022)
- * Offseason or practice squad member only

Awards and highlights
- Second-team All-MAC (2021)

Career NFL statistics
- Games played: 14
- Total tackles: 4
- Stats at Pro Football Reference

Sterling Weatherford (born January 26, 1999) is an American former professional football player who was a linebacker for the Chicago Bears of the National Football League (NFL). He was signed by the Indianapolis Colts as an undrafted free agent in 2022 after playing college football for the Miami RedHawks.

== College career ==
Weatherford was a two-star prospect coming out of Hamilton Heights and committed to the Miami RedHawks on August 2, 2016. In his freshman season, he was named Defensive Scout Team Player of the Year, before playing in twelve games as a sophomore, starting one. In a game against Army, Weatherford recorded a career-high nine tackles. In 2019, he finished second on the team with ninety-eight tackles, helping Miami defeat Central Michigan for the MAC Championship. In 2021, he was named All-MAC 2nd Team Defense after recording sixty-six tackles, two interceptions, and a sack.

== Professional career ==
Pre-draft measurables
Height	Weight	Arm length	Hand span	40-yard dash	10-yard split	20-yard split	20-yard shuttle	Three-cone drill	Vertical jump	Broad jump	Bench press
6 ft 4 in (1.93 m)	224 lb (102 kg)	32 in (0.81 m)	8 5/8 in (0.22 m)	4.60 s	1.58 s	2.66 s	4.33 s	6.93 s	36.0 in (0.91 m)	9 ft 9 in (2.97 m)	21 reps
All values from Pro Day

=== Indianapolis Colts ===
Weatherford signed with the Indianapolis Colts as an undrafted free agent following the 2022 NFL draft on April 30, 2022. In his first preseason game, Weatherford recorded an interception of Buffalo Bills quarterback Matt Barkley. He was waived during final roster cuts on August 30.

=== Chicago Bears ===
On August 31, 2022, Weatherford was claimed by the Chicago Bears and signed to their active roster. Colts GM Chris Ballard was reportedly "upset" that the Bears claimed Weatherford, hoping to re-sign him to the team's practice squad.

On July 25, 2023, Weatherford was waived.

On July 26, 2023, Weatherford was claimed off waivers by the Los Angeles Rams, but was waived two days later with a failed physical.
