= Millersburg =

Millersburg may refer to several places in the United States:

- Millersburg, Illinois, an unincorporated community in Mercer County
- Millersburg, Indiana, a town in Elkhart County
- Millersburg, Hamilton County, Indiana, an unincorporated community in Jackson Township
- Millersburg, Orange County, Indiana, an unincorporated community in Stampers Creek Township
- Millersburg, Warrick County, Indiana, an unincorporated community in Campbell Township
- Millersburg, Iowa, a city in Iowa County
- Millersburg, Kentucky, a city in Bourbon County
- Millersburg, Michigan, a village in Presque Isle County
- Millersburg, Minnesota, an unincorporated community in Rice County
- Millersburg, Missouri
- Millersburg, Ohio, a village in Holmes County
- Millersburg, Oregon, a city in Linn County
- Millersburg, Pennsylvania, a borough in Dauphin County
