= Hamilton Heights High School =

Public school in Indiana, United States

- Hamilton Heights Logo

Location
- 25802 State Road 19; Arcadia, Hamilton County, Indiana 46030; United States; 40°9′55.54″N 86°0′54.19″W

Information
- Type: Public high school
- Established: 1965
- School district: Hamilton Heights School Corporation
- School code: CBRG
- Dean: Lori Hippensteel
- Principal: Whitney Gray
- Teaching staff: 46.17 (FTE)
- Grades: 9-12
- Enrollment: 687 (2023–2024)
- Student to teacher ratio: 14.88
- Hours in school day: 8:00 a.m. - 3:05 p.m. 8:00 a.m. - 2:30 p.m. (Wednesday)
- Color
- Fight song: Minnesota Rouser
- Athletics conference: Hoosier Athletic Conference
- Team name: Huskies
- Rival: Tipton High School (Indiana)
- Website: hs.hhschuskies.org

Hamilton Heights High School was founded in 1965 with the consolidation of Jackson Central Eagles (1943–1965) and the Walnut Grove Wolves (1906–65). Jackson Central was itself formed from the consolidation of the Arcadia Dragons (1906–43), the Atlanta Cardinals (1906–07, 1908–43), and the Cicero Red Devils (1905–12, 1913–43).

(HHHS) is a fully accredited public high school in the Hamilton Heights School Corporation that serves grades 9–12 in the rural northern part of Hamilton County, Indiana. As such, Hamilton Heights is the second smallest public high school in Hamilton County, being one of just only three high schools in the county with fewer than 2,000 students (the others being Sheridan High School and the private Guerin Catholic High School). The current principal is Whitney Gray.

== Figures ==
For the 2008–09 school year, 733 students were enrolled in grades 9–12, including 374 females and 359 males. In 2008, 84.1% of seniors graduated; 27.2% of seniors graduated with honors. 81% of all graduates reported an intention to pursue a college education.

HHHS participates in the statewide standardized testing regimen known as ISTEP. Of all students tested in the 2008–09 school year, 80.4% of students passed both the English/Language Arts and Mathematics portions of the test, compared to the state average of 73.6%.

For 2007–08, the average score of college-bound juniors taking the PSAT was 141.3, compared to the state average of 136.5. The average composite SAT score of college-bound seniors for 2007-08 was 1020, compared to the state average of 1004. For the same period, the average composite ACT score was 22.3, compared to the state average of 20.0. Also, for the same period, five percent of students took Advanced Placement tests, compared to the state average of 14%.

In the 2008–09 school year, the average teacher age was 44.5 years, with an average of 17.3 years of teaching experience. The average teacher salary was $49,738. The student to teacher ratio in 2008-09 was 18.3 to 1.

== Curriculum ==
HHHS operates on a traditional schedule, and is divided into the Agriculture, Industrial Education, Science, Business Technology, Fine Arts, Mathematics, Social Studies, Band, English, Foreign Language, Physical Education and Health, Special Education, Athletics, School to College Program, School to Work Program, and Media Center departments. Currently, the Foreign Language department offers instruction in French and Spanish.

Band has been made a popular activity by students at HHHS. Reportedly, of the 714 students enrolled at the school in 2007–08, 100 students participated in the marching band, concert band, pep band, and color guard.

According to the DOE, the Fine Arts department has budgeted for classes in Ceramics, Drawing, Chorus, Dance Performance, and Music Theory and Composition for the 2008–09 school year.

== Athletics ==
HHHS is a division 3A school that supports 19 sports which offer 29 teams to more than 400 students that participate in more than 400 contests annually. The school mascot is the Husky Victor-e. The school colors are orange, white, and brown.

The school once competed against neighboring schools in the Mid Indiana Conference. The programs for men included football, soccer, cross country, tennis, basketball, swimming and diving, wrestling, baseball, golf, and track and field. Programs for women included volleyball, soccer, cross country, golf, basketball, swimming and diving, cheerleading, softball, tennis, and track and field.

Each year, the school's football program battles Tipton High School for "The Hammer" traveling trophy.

== Notable alumni ==
- Chris Faulkner (Class of 1978), Former Professional Football Player (1983–1986).
- Sterling Weatherford (Class of 2016), Current (as of 2023) NFL free agent. Played for both the Colts and the Bears during the 2022 season.
- Ryan White (Class of 1990), teenager who became a national poster child for HIV/AIDS in the United States

== See also ==
- List of high schools in Indiana
