= Maurice W. Manche Farmstead =

- U.S. National Register of Historic Places
- U.S. Historic district
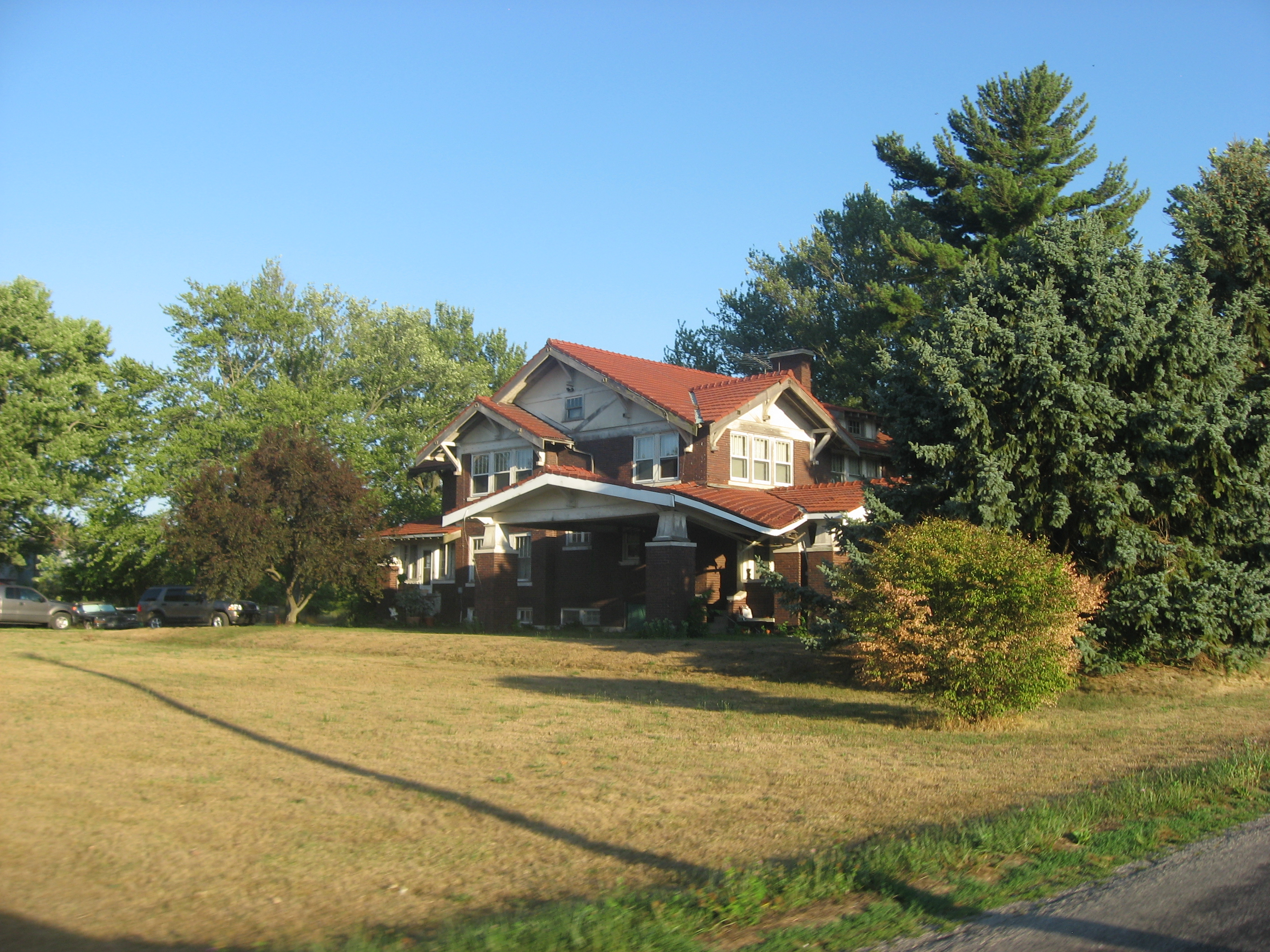
- Maurice W. Manche Farmhouse, August 2012

- Location within Indiana Location within the United States
- Location: County Road 900W, west of Carthage in Ripley Township, Rush County, Indiana
- Coordinates: 39°44′18″N 85°29′21″W
- Area: 160 acres (65 ha)
- Built: 1919
- Architectural style: Bungalow/craftsman, Gambrel roof barn
- NRHP reference No.: 89001411
- Added to NRHP: September 14, 1989

Maurice W. Manche Farmstead is a historic home and farm and national historic district located in Ripley Township, Rush County, Indiana. The farmhouse was built in 1919, and is large two-story, Bungalow / American Craftsman style dwelling faced in brown brick, stucco and half-timbering. It has a low pitched roof with red ceramic tile features a connected long porte cochere and porch. Also on the property are the contributing gambrel roofed livestock barn, corn crib, windmill, scale shed, and fence.

It was listed on the National Register of Historic Places in 1989.
