= Chris Faulkner =

American football player (born 1960)

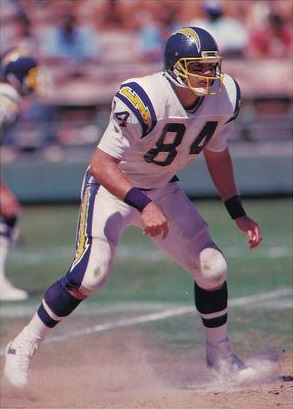
- Faulkner with the San Diego Chargers c. 1985

No. 88, 84
- Position: Tight end

Personal information
- Born: April 13, 1960 (age 66); Tipton, Indiana, U.S.
- Listed height: 6 ft 4 in (1.93 m)
- Listed weight: 255 lb (116 kg)

Career information
- High school: Hamilton Heights (Arcadia, Indiana)
- College: Florida
- NFL draft: 1983: 4th round, 108th overall pick

Career history
- Dallas Cowboys (1983)*; Los Angeles Rams (1984); San Diego Chargers (1985); Tampa Bay Buccaneers (1986)
- * Offseason or practice squad member only

Awards and highlights
- First-team All-SEC (1980); SEC Sophomore of the year (1980)

Career NFL statistics
- Games played: 17
- Stats at Pro Football Reference

Christopher Alan Faulkner (born April 13, 1960) is an American former professional football player who was a tight end in the National Football League (NFL) for the Los Angeles Rams and San Diego Chargers. He was selected by the Dallas Cowboys in the fourth round of the 1983 NFL draft after playing college football for the Florida Gators.

== Early life ==
Faulkner was born in Tipton, Indiana. He attended Hamilton Heights High School in Arcadia, Indiana. He had never played organized football until his senior year, when he was used as a running back and punter.

== College career ==
Faulkner enrolled at the University of Florida in Gainesville, Florida, where he walked on and was redshirted, before being converted into a tight end and earning a scholarship.

As a freshman, he was the team's second leading receiver with 22 receptions for 246 yards and 4 touchdown catches (tied for the SEC lead).

In 1980, he was named SEC sophomore of the year and All-SEC, after recording 24 receptions (tied for second on the team), 259 receiving yards (third on the team) and 3 receiving touchdowns (tied for the team lead). He has 9 receptions for 64 yards and 2 touchdowns against Georgia Tech. He also started 2 games at offensive guard.

As junior, he only played in 6 games because of injuries and finished with a disappointing 6 receptions for 61 yards and one touchdown.

As a senior, he split time with Mike Mularkey, posting 19 receptions (sixth on the team) for 186 yards (sixth on the team) and no touchdowns. In the Hula Bowl, he made 5 receptions for 64 yards. He finished his college career with 71 receptions for 752 yards and eight touchdowns.

== Professional career ==
=== Dallas Cowboys ===
Faulkner was selected by the Dallas Cowboys in the fourth round (108th overall) of the 1983 NFL draft. He was also selected by the Tampa Bay Bandits in the 1983 USFL Territorial Draft. Although he was expected to be a blocking option in the two tight end packages. After having problems with his assignments, the team kept undrafted free agent Cleo Simmons instead and waived Faulkner on August 22.

=== Los Angeles Rams ===
On January 31, 1984, the Los Angeles Rams signed him as a free agent, with the intention of moving him to the offensive line, but after experiencing injury problems in the tight end position, the team canceled its original plan. On November 27, the team placed him on the reserve/non-football illness list. He was cut on August 27, 1985.

=== San Diego Chargers ===
On August 31, 1985, Faulkner was signed as a free agent by the San Diego Chargers to be the team's third-string tight end while Kellen Winslow recovered from his serious knee injury. He remained on the roster by being able to play different positions (fullback, tight end and guard), until suffering a season ending knee injury in the ninth game against the Denver Broncos.

During the 1986 training camp he was switched to the defensive line, before being released on August 26.

=== Tampa Bay Buccaneers ===
On October 21, 1986, the Tampa Bay Buccaneers signed him as a free agent. He was waived two days later.
