= Walnut Ridge Friends Meetinghouse =

Historic meetinghouse in Indiana, United States

- U.S. National Register of Historic Places
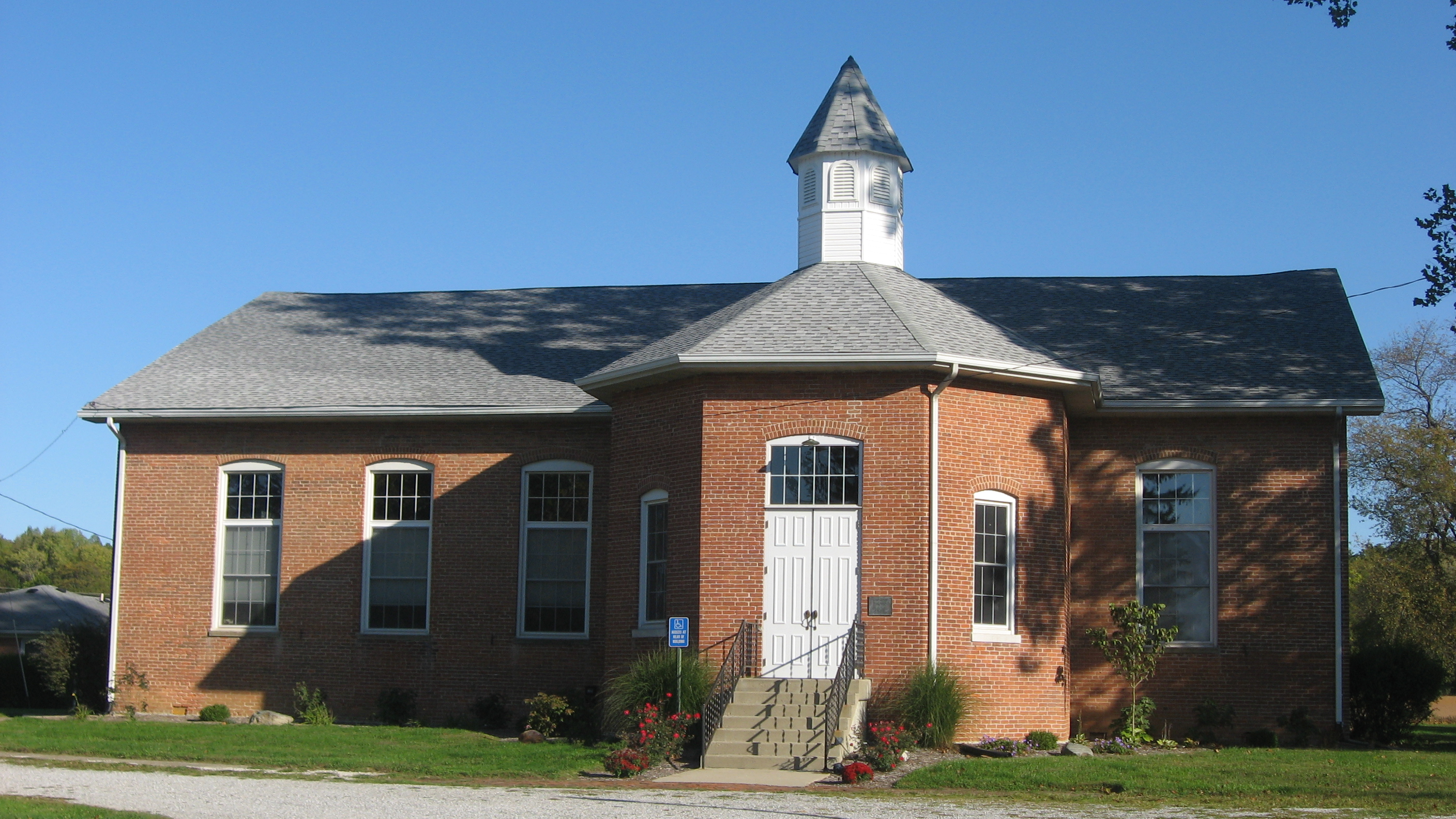
- Walnut Ridge Friends Meetinghouse, October 2011

- Location within Indiana Location within the United States
- Location: West of Carthage in Ripley Township, Rush County, Indiana
- Coordinates: 39°43′41″N 85°36′48″W
- Area: 4 acres (1.6 ha)
- Built: 1827, 1866, 1890, 1972, 1976
- Architectural style: Italianate
- NRHP reference No.: 84001616
- Added to NRHP: March 1, 1984

Walnut Ridge Friends Meetinghouse is a historic Quaker meeting house located in Ripley Township, Rush County, Indiana. It was originally built in 1826 as a log cabin, burned in 1864, and rebuilt in 1866. The present building is a one-story, vernacular Italianate style brick building with a moderately pitched gable roof. It features a projecting octagonal entrance bay added in 1890 at the time of an extensive renovation.

The Duck Creek Quakers granted permission to use the new log cabin as a formal Meetinghouse in 1827.

Toward the end of the Civil War, the Quaker role in the Underground Railroad led to Southern sympathisers assumed to be associated with the Knights of the Golden Circle burning the Walnut Ridge meetinghouse.

The building was remodeled in 1972 and a fellowship room addition constructed in 1976. It was listed on the National Register of Historic Places in 1984.
