= Carl Glennis Roberts =

American surgeon, civil rights activist (1886–1950)

- Born: December 15, 1886; Roberts Settlement, Hamilton County, Indiana, United States
- Died: January 15, 1950 (aged 63); Chicago, Illinois, United States
- Education: Chicago College of Medicine and Surgery, Valparaiso University, University of Chicago Medical School
- Occupations: Surgeon, gynecologist, physician, civil rights leader
- Spouse: Lucille E. Williams (m. 1907–1950; his death)
- Children: 2

Carl Glennis Roberts Sr., MD (1886–1950) was an American surgeon, gynecologist, and civil right leader, active in Chicago. He was one of the first African Americans to be elected to the American College of Surgeons; he was also a former president of the National Medical Association.

== Early life and family ==
Carl Glennis Roberts was born on December 15, 1886, in Roberts Settlement in Hamilton County, Indiana. His father Carl Glennis Roberts Sr. (1837–1917) was also born at Roberts Settlement, and his paternal great-grandparents from North Carolina had established Roberts Settlement in 1823. His maternal great-grandfather was Jack Simpson, a chief of the Choctaw tribe.

Roberts graduated from Fairmont High School and Academy, where he attended from 1901 to 1905.

== Education ==
He attended the Chicago College of Medicine and Surgery (now Stritch School of Medicine); and Valparaiso University from 1907 to 1911. Roberts was the first Black (or "colored") graduate from the medical school at Valparaiso University.

After graduation, he continued his surgical studies at numerous schools, including at the Illinois Post Graduate School of Therapeutics; the Chicago Laboratory of Surgical Techniques; the Chicago Institute of Surgery; the Illinois Post-Graduate School of Operative Surgery; the University of Chicago Medical School (now Pritzker School of Medicine); and the Cook County Hospital Graduate School, Laboratory of Surgical Pathology.

== Career ==
In 1911, after receiving his medical degree, Roberts started a general medical practice and internship at the German American Hospital. During World War I, Roberts organized the first African American sanitary corps for the American Red Cross, where he served as the commandant from 1918 to 1920.

At the request of medical chief George Cleveland Hall, Roberts joined Provident Hospital in 1916 as the chairman of gynecology, and maintained this role until 1923; followed by serving as the chairman of surgery starting in 1935. He worked as a gynecologist at Provident Hospital, from 1916 to 1920; as a gynecologist at the German American Hospital from 1918 to 1922; as a surgeon and attending staff at Chicago General Hospital from 1911 to 1928.

Roberts served in 1925 as the president of the Chicago NAACP. He was the president of the National Medical Association, from 1926 to 1927. Roberts was one of the first African Americans to be certified by the American Board of Surgery. Roberts also lectures at white Protestant churches on "racial relationships".

== Death ==
He experienced coronary thrombosis in 1941, and was said to have never fully recovered. Roberts died of a heart attack on January 15, 1950, in Chicago.

After his death, the National Medical Association held a memorial in his honor at the Hampton Institute (now Hampton University).
