= Ione Virginia Hill Cowles =

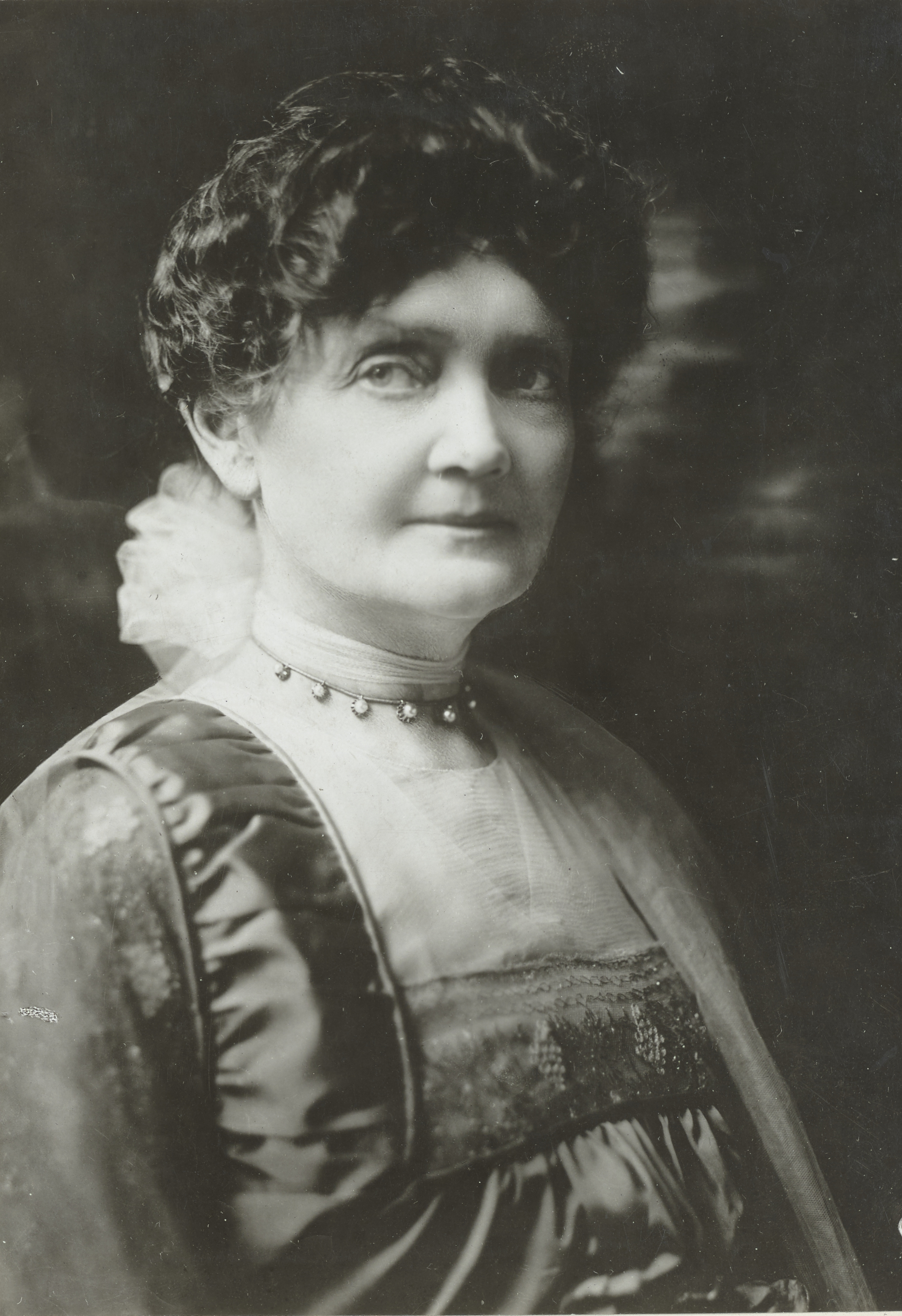
Ione Virginia Hill Cowles

Ione Virginia Hill Cowles (née, Hill; after marriage, Mrs. Josiah Evans Cowles; March 13, 1858 - July 4, 1940) was an American clubwoman and social leader. Cowles served as eighth international president of the General Federation of Women's Clubs (GFWC) from 1916 to 1918, and was then re-elected from 1918 to 1920. She preceded her executive work as head of the largest group of federated women in the U.S. by her experience gained as president of the California State Federation Women's Clubs from 1906 to 1907.

== Biography ==
Ione Virginia Hill was born in Carthage, Indiana, March 13, 1858. She was the daughter of Thomas Clarkson Hill, a prominent Quaker of Chicago, Illinois, and Adaline (Butler) Hill.

Cowles was a student at Earlham College, Richmond, Indiana, 1875 (A.M., 1916).

In 1890, in Chicago, she married Josiah Evans Cowles, M.D., of Los Angeles, California and they made that city their home.

Cowles served as President of the California State Federation Women's Clubs, 1905–06. She was the Director, 1904–06; Treasurer, 1906–08; First Vice-president, 1908–12; and President, 1916–20, of the GFWC. She was also a member, Woman's Committee of the Council of National Defense.

Cowles was identified with a number of prominent charities. In religion, she was Episcopalian, and served as president of Women's Auxiliary Diocese of Los Angeles.

Cowles died at her home in Los Angeles, July 4, 1940. Her papers are held in a collection by the General Federation of Women's Clubs, Washington, D.C.
