= Roads Hotel =

- U.S. National Register of Historic Places
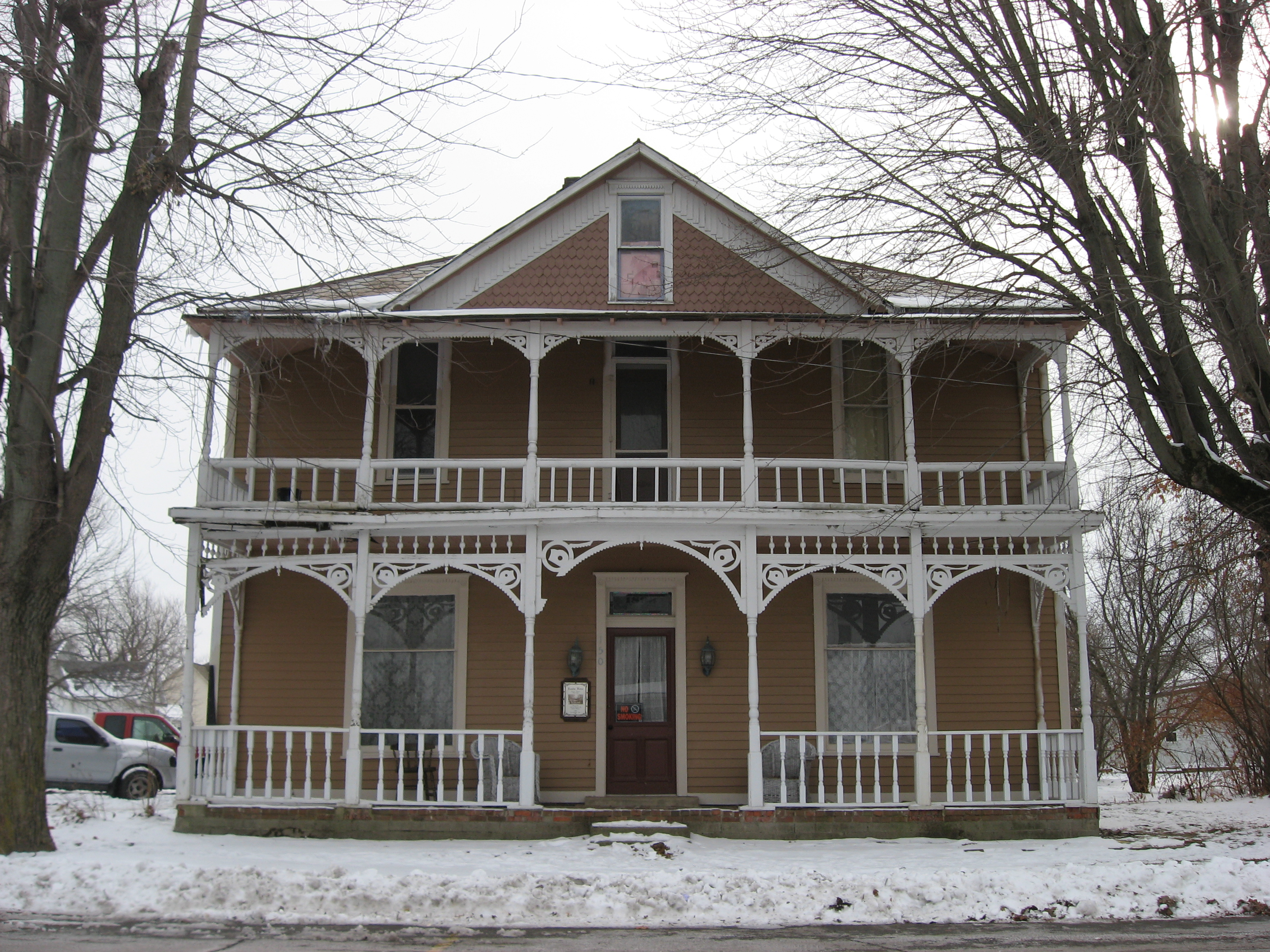
- Roads Hotel, January 2011

- Location within Indiana Location within the United States
- Location: 150 E. Main St., Atlanta, Indiana
- Coordinates: 40°12′57″N 86°1′31″W
- Area: less than one acre
- Built: 1893
- Architectural style: Queen Anne
- NRHP reference No.: 87002187
- Added to NRHP: December 30, 1987

Roads Hotel is a historic hotel building located at Atlanta, Indiana. It was built in 1893, and is a two-story, rectangular, Queen Anne style frame building. It measures approximately 36 feet wide by 60 feet deep and features a two-story front porch and cross gable. The porch features a jigsaw cross gable braces and ornate porch turnings and braces. It remained in use as a hotel until the 1920s and later converted to apartments.

It was listed on the National Register of Historic Places in 1987.
