= Hamilton Heights School Corporation =

School district in Indiana

Address
- 410 W. Main Street Arcadia, Indiana, 46030; United States

District information
- Type: Public
- Motto: Experience Excellence...Explore Opportunities...Realize Potential
- Grades: P–12
- Superintendent: Derek Arrowwood
- Schools: 3
- NCES District ID: 1804260

Students and staff
- Students: 2,336 (2023-2024)
- Teachers: 143.00 (FTE)
- Staff: 298.70 (FTE)
- Student–teacher ratio: 16.34
- District mascot: Husky
- Colors: Orange and white

Other information
- Website: www.hhschuskies.org

Hamilton Heights School Corporation is a public school district serving the northeastern rural communities in Hamilton County, Indiana. It covers over 100 square miles (260 km^{2}) of mostly farmland within Jackson and White River townships.

Its boundary includes Arcadia, Atlanta, and Cicero.

== Schools ==
The schools lie between the two largest communities, Cicero and Arcadia.

- Elementary school (grades P–4)
- Middle school (grades 5–8)
- High school (grades 9–12)

== Athletics ==
The Hamilton Heights mascot is the husky. Its colors are orange and white.

== Notable alumni ==
=== Ryan White ===
The school system came to national prominence in 1987 when Ryan White, a hemophiliac who contracted AIDS via a blood transfusion, enrolled as a student. In contrast to his previous school, Western School Corporation in Kokomo, Indiana, which had attempted to segregate him from the student population, Hamilton Heights welcomed Ryan and prepared its students with AIDS education courses. The school was praised for its openness and courage, drawing national news coverage. When Ryan succumbed to his illness in 1990, many students attended his funeral.
