= Millersburg, Hamilton County, Indiana =

- Unincorporated community
- Location within Indiana Location within the United States
- Coordinates: 40°11′41″N 86°01′26″W
- Country: United States
- State: Indiana
- County: Hamilton
- Township: Jackson
- Elevation: 860 ft (260 m)
- ZIP code: 46030
- FIPS code: 18-49554
- GNIS feature ID: 439233

Millersburg is an unincorporated community in Jackson Township, Hamilton County, Indiana. The community was named for Peter Miller, a pioneer settler.
