= Atlanta, Indiana =

- Town
- Town of Atlanta
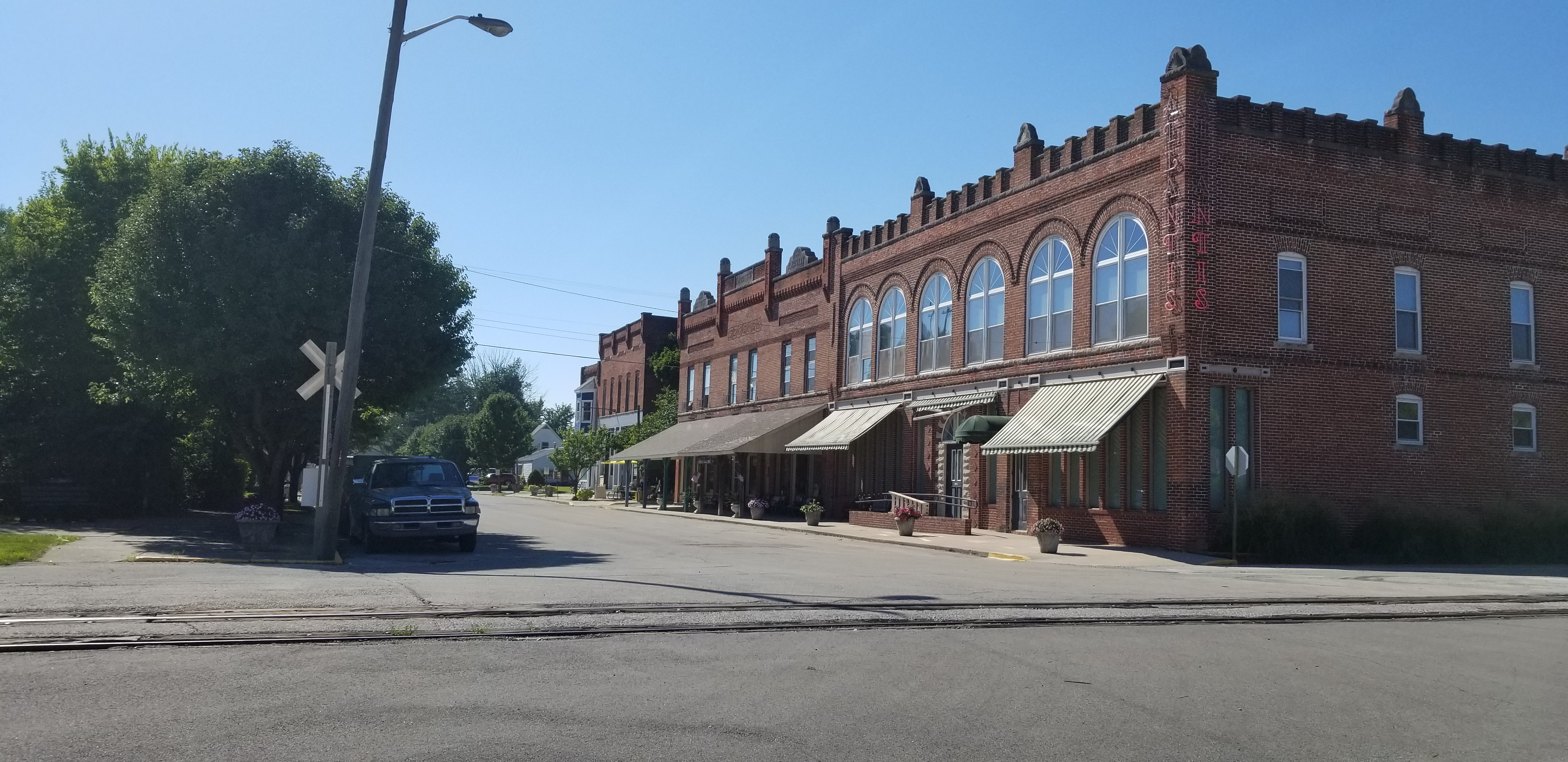

- Seal

- Location of Atlanta in Hamilton County, Indiana
- Coordinates: 40°12′50″N 86°01′37″W
- Country: United States
- State: Indiana
- County: Hamilton
- Township: Jackson
- Established: 1834
- Incorporated: 1900
- Named for: Atlanta, Georgia

Area
  - Total: 0.31 sq mi (0.81 km^{2})
  - Land: 0.31 sq mi (0.81 km^{2})
  - Water: 0 sq mi (0.00 km^{2})
- Elevation: 860 ft (260 m)

Population (2020)
  - Total: 712
  - Density: 2,271.7/sq mi (877.12/km^{2})
- Time zone: UTC−5 (EST)
  - Summer (DST): UTC−5 (EST)
- ZIP code: 46031
- Area code: 765
- FIPS code: 18-02602
- GNIS ID: 2397443
- Website: www.atlantaindiana.com

Atlanta is a town in Jackson Township, Hamilton County, Indiana, United States. The population was 712 at the 2020 census.

== History ==
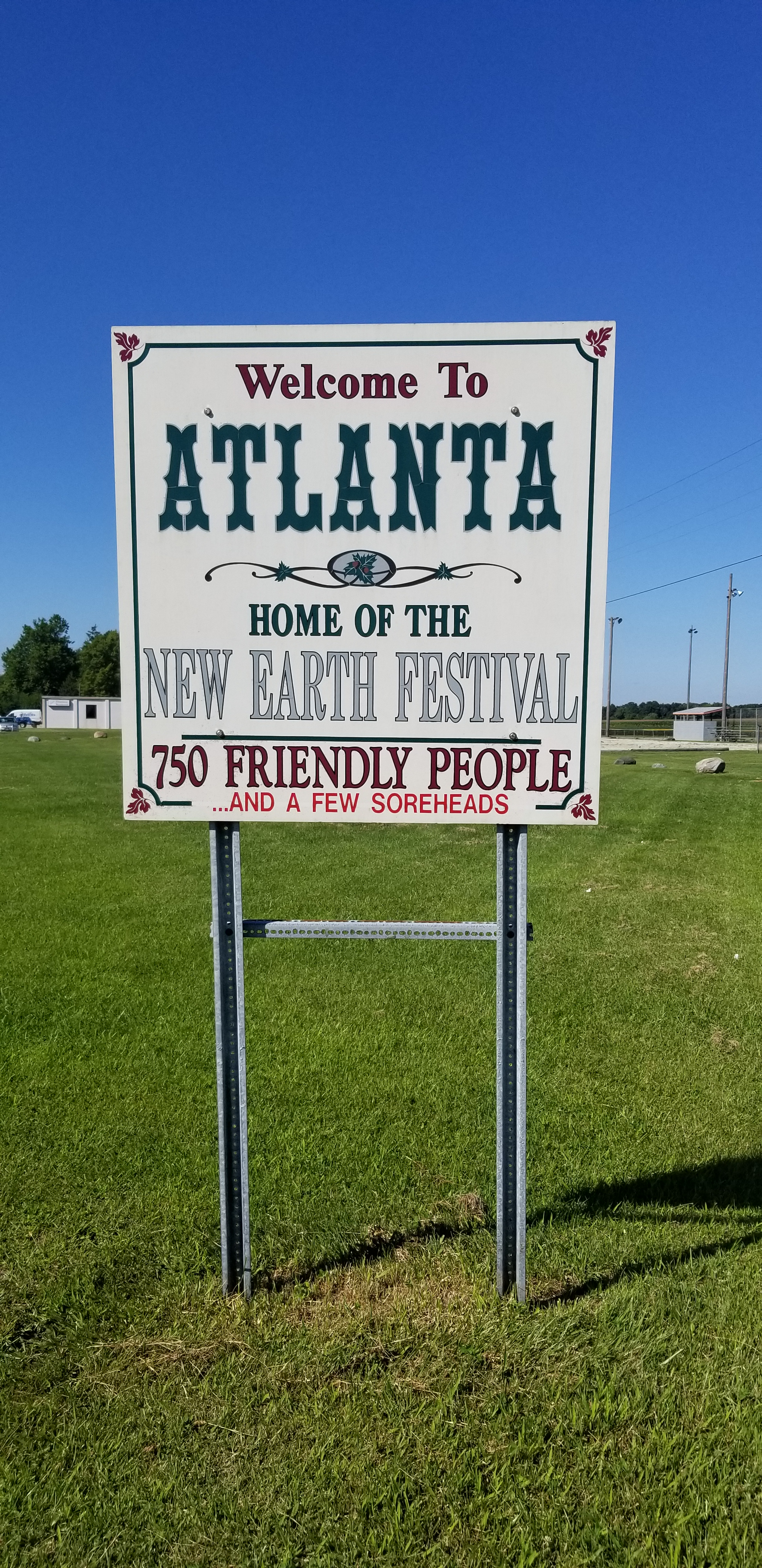
Sign welcoming visitors to Atlanta, Indiana

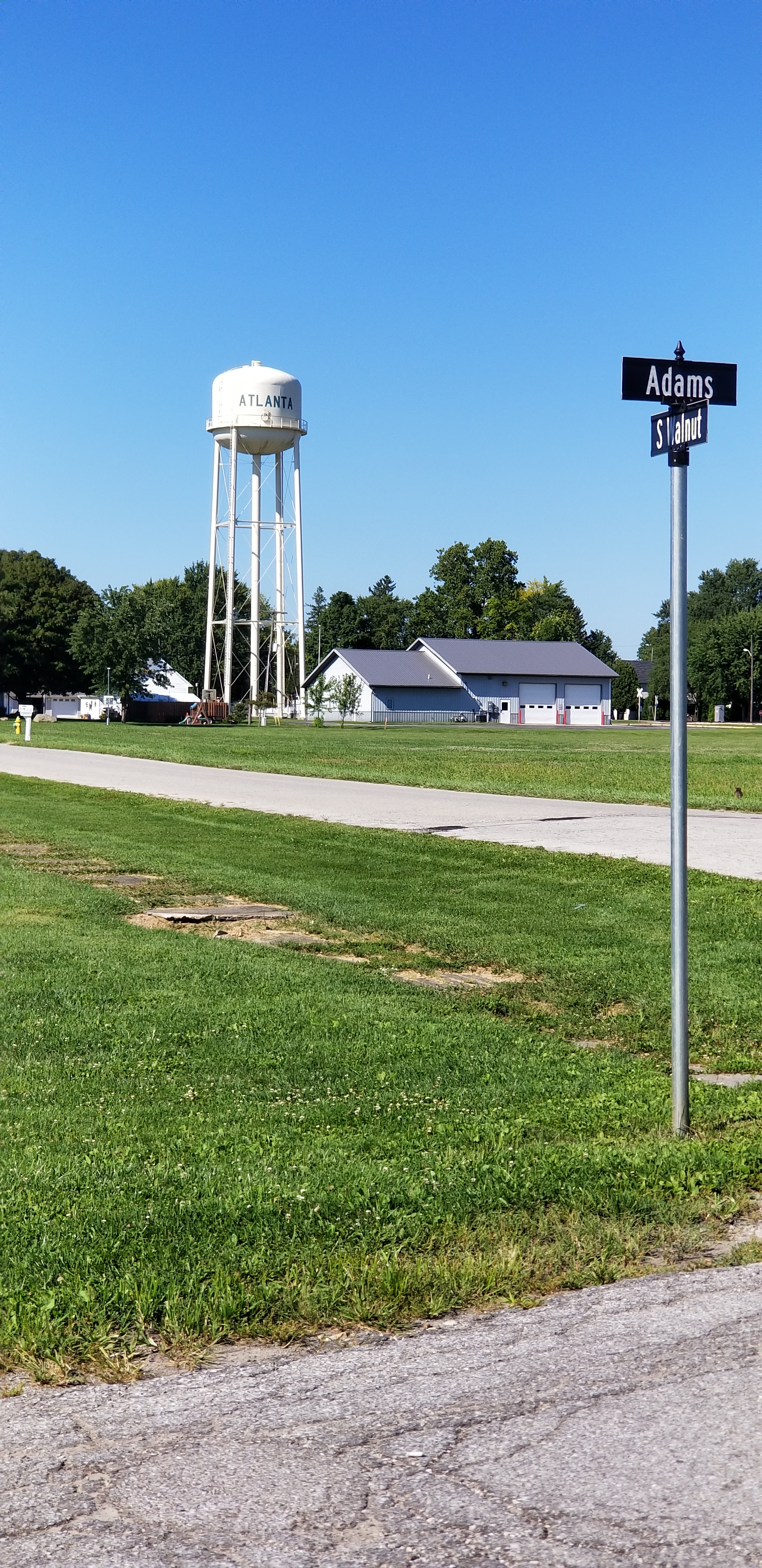
Water tower in Atlanta, Indiana

Atlanta had its start through the merger of the three neighboring towns of Spargerville, Shielville, and Buena Vista. The earliest part of what is now Atlanta was laid out in 1834; the town has been called Atlanta since 1885 and was incorporated in 1900. The town most likely was named after Atlanta, Georgia.

Roads Hotel was listed on the National Register of Historic Places in 1987.

== Geography ==
According to the 2020 census, Atlanta has a total area of 0.313 square miles (0.81 km^{2}), all land.

== Demographics ==
Historical population
Census	Pop.	Note	%±
1900	1,000		—
1910	876		−12.4%
1920	678		−22.6%
1930	551		−18.7%
1940	479		−13.1%
1950	613		28.0%
1960	602		−1.8%
1970	620		3.0%
1980	657		6.0%
1990	703		7.0%
2000	761		8.3%
2010	725		−4.7%
2020	712		−1.8%
U.S. Decennial Census

=== 2010 census ===
As of the 2010 census, there were 725 people, 265 households, and 203 families living in the town. The population density was 2,416.7 inhabitants per square mile (933.1/km^{2}). There were 302 housing units at an average density of 1,006.7 per square mile (388.7/km^{2}). The racial makeup of the town was 97.8% White, 0.6% African American, 1.4% from other races, and 0.3% from two or more races. Hispanic or Latino of any race were 1.9% of the population.

There were 265 households, of which 39.2% had children under the age of 18 living with them, 55.8% were married couples living together, 13.2% had a female householder with no husband present, 7.5% had a male householder with no wife present, and 23.4% were non-families. 17.0% of all households were made up of individuals, and 8.4% had someone living alone who was 65 years of age or older. The average household size was 2.69 and the average family size was 3.03.

The median age in the town was 36.1 years. 27% of residents were under the age of 18; 7% were between the ages of 18 and 24; 27.4% were from 25 to 44; 28.4% were from 45 to 64; and 10.1% were 65 years of age or older. The gender makeup of the town was 49.0% male and 51.0% female.

=== 2000 census ===
As of the 2000 census, there were 761 people, 261 households, and 205 families living in the town. The population density was 2,533.9 inhabitants per square mile (978.3/km^{2}). There were 283 housing units at an average density of 942.3 per square mile (363.8/km^{2}). The racial makeup of the town was 96.85% White, 0.66% Native American, 0.26% Asian, 1.45% from other races, and 0.79% from two or more races. Hispanic or Latino of any race were 2.10% of the population.

There were 261 households, out of which 44.8% had children under the age of 18 living with them, 62.1% were married couples living together, 10.3% had a female householder with no husband present, and 21.1% were non-families. 16.5% of all households were made up of individuals, and 6.1% had someone living alone who was 65 years of age or older. The average household size was 2.90 and the average family size was 3.20.

In the town, the population was spread out, with 32.1% under the age of 18, 7.4% from 18 to 24, 33.9% from 25 to 44, 19.7% from 45 to 64, and 7.0% who were 65 years of age or older. The median age was 34 years. For every 100 females, there were 97.2 males. For every 100 females age 18 and over, there were 92.2 males.

The median income for a household in the town was $43,036, and the median income for a family was $47,159. Males had a median income of $33,438 versus $22,011 for females. The per capita income for the town was $16,342. About 5.5% of families and 7.0% of the population were below the poverty line, including 5.9% of those under age 18 and 10.9% of those age 65 or over.

== Education ==
Atlanta is served by the Hamilton Heights School Corporation.
