= Jackson Township, Hamilton County, Indiana =

Jackson Township
- Township
- Logo

- Location in Hamilton County
- Coordinates: 40°09′21″N 86°03′37″W
- Country: United States
- State: Indiana
- County: Hamilton
- Organized: 1833

Government
  - Type: Indiana township
  - Trustee: Robyn Cook
  - Deputy Trustee: Nicole Duncan

Area
  - Total: 56.19 sq mi (145.5 km^{2})
  - Land: 54.82 sq mi (142.0 km^{2})
  - Water: 1.36 sq mi (3.5 km^{2}) 2.42%
- Elevation: 869 ft (265 m)

Population (2020)
  - Total: 10,863
  - Density: 198.2/sq mi (76.51/km^{2})
- Time zone: UTC-5 (EST)
  - Summer (DST): UTC-4 (EDT)
- ZIP codes: 46030 (Arcadia); 46031 (Atlanta); 46034 (Cicero); 46062 (Noblesville)
- Area code(s): 317, 463, 765
- FIPS code: 18-37044
- GNIS feature ID: 453446
- Website: jacksontownshiptrustee.com

Jackson Township is one of nine townships in Hamilton County, Indiana, United States. As of the 2020 census, its population was 10,863.

== History ==
Jackson Township was organized in 1833.

Roberts Chapel was listed on the National Register of Historic Places in 1996.

== Geography ==
The township has a total area of 56.194 square miles (145.54 km^{2}), of which 54.828 square miles (142.00 km^{2}) is land and 1.366 square miles (3.54 km^{2}) is water. The streams of Bear Slide Creek, Bennett Ditch, Cicero Creek, Hinkle Creek, Little Cicero Creek, Possum Run, Sugar Run, Taylor Creek, and Weasel Creek run through this township.

=== Cities and towns ===
- Atlanta
- Arcadia
- Cicero

=== Unincorporated communities ===
- Deming
- Millersburg

(This list is based on USGS data and may include former settlements.)

=== Adjacent townships ===
- Cicero Township, Tipton County (north)
- White River Township (east)
- Noblesville Township (south)
- Washington Township (southwest)
- Adams Township (west)
- Jefferson Township, Tipton County (northwest)

=== Cemeteries ===
The township contains thirteen cemeteries: Brethren, Cicero, Dunn, Emmanuel Lutheran, Hinkle, Hurley, Morley, Mount Pleasant, Robert's Chapel, Scherer, Taylor and West Grove.

=== Major highways ===
- U.S. Route 31
- State Road 19

=== Airports and landing strips ===
- Heinzman Airport

== Education ==
Jackson Township residents may request a free library card from the Hamilton North Public Library in Cicero.

The township is served by Hamilton Heights School Corporation, which is located in Arcadia.
