= Ripley Township, Rush County, Indiana =

Ripley Township
- Township
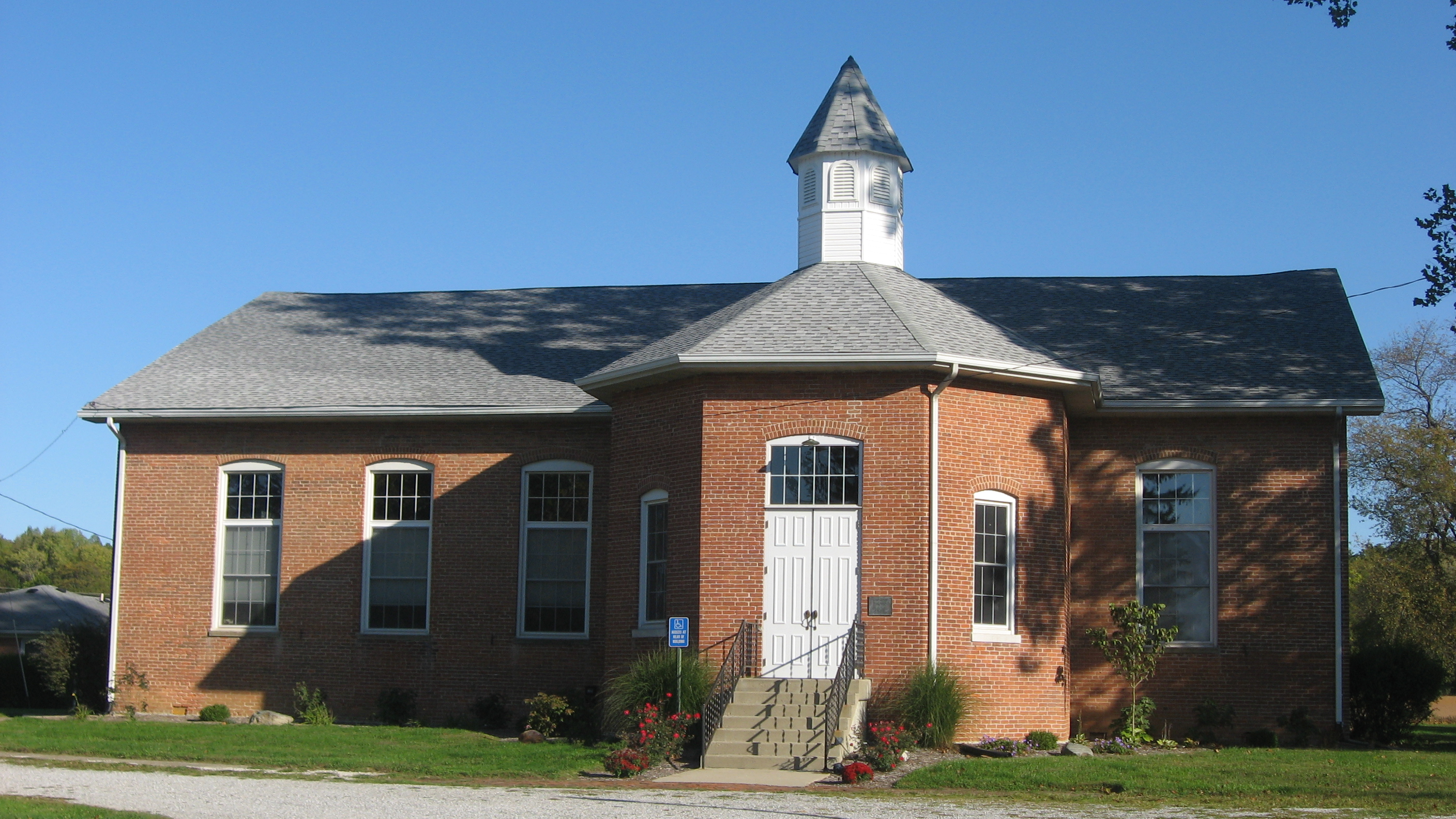
- Walnut Ridge Friends Meetinghouse, a historic site in the township

- Coordinates: 39°44′33″N 85°34′43″W
- Country: United States
- State: Indiana
- County: Rush

Government
  - Type: Indiana township

Area
  - Total: 35.86 sq mi (92.9 km^{2})
  - Land: 35.68 sq mi (92.4 km^{2})
  - Water: 0.18 sq mi (0.47 km^{2})
- Elevation: 928 ft (283 m)

Population (2020)
  - Total: 2,035
  - Density: 57.03/sq mi (22.02/km^{2})
- Time zone: UTC-5 (Eastern (EST))
  - Summer (DST): UTC-4 (EDT)
- Area code: 765
- FIPS code: 18-64656
- GNIS feature ID: 453804

Ripley Township is one of twelve townships in Rush County, Indiana. As of the 2020 census, its population was 2,035 and it contained 891 housing units.

Historical population
Census	Pop.	Note	%±
1890	2,174		—
1900	2,118		−2.6%
1910	1,803		−14.9%
1920	1,815		0.7%
1930	1,783		−1.8%
1940	1,751		−1.8%
1950	1,831		4.6%
1960	1,876		2.5%
1970	1,998		6.5%
1980	1,988		−0.5%
1990	1,910		−3.9%
2000	2,111		10.5%
2010	2,156		2.1%
2020	2,035		−5.6%
Source: US Decennial Census

== History ==
The County Line Bridge, Maurice W. Manche Farmstead, and Walnut Ridge Friends Meetinghouse are listed on the National Register of Historic Places.

== Geography ==
According to the 2010 census, the township has a total area of 35.86 square miles (92.9 km^{2}), of which 35.68 square miles (92.4 km^{2}) (or 99.50%) is land and 0.18 square miles (0.47 km^{2}) (or 0.50%) is water.

=== Cities and towns ===
- Carthage

=== Unincorporated towns ===
- Charlottesville at 39.7903221°N 85.6127533°W

(This list is based on USGS data and may include former settlements.)
