= Old South =

American South that was part of the British colonies

- Region
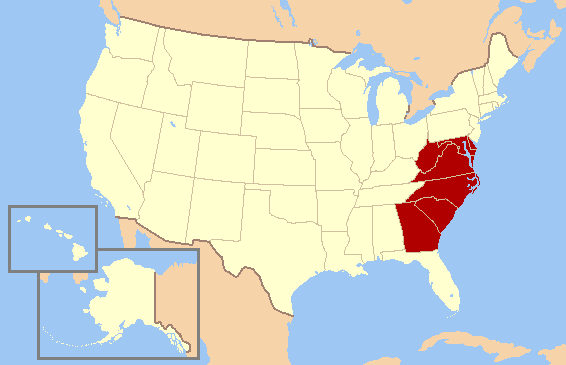
- Map of the Old South
- Country: United States
- States: Virginia; Maryland; North Carolina; South Carolina; Georgia; West Virginia
- Largest city: Charlotte

Area
  - Total: 224,670 sq mi (581,900 km^{2})

Population (2025)
  - Total: 44,982,591

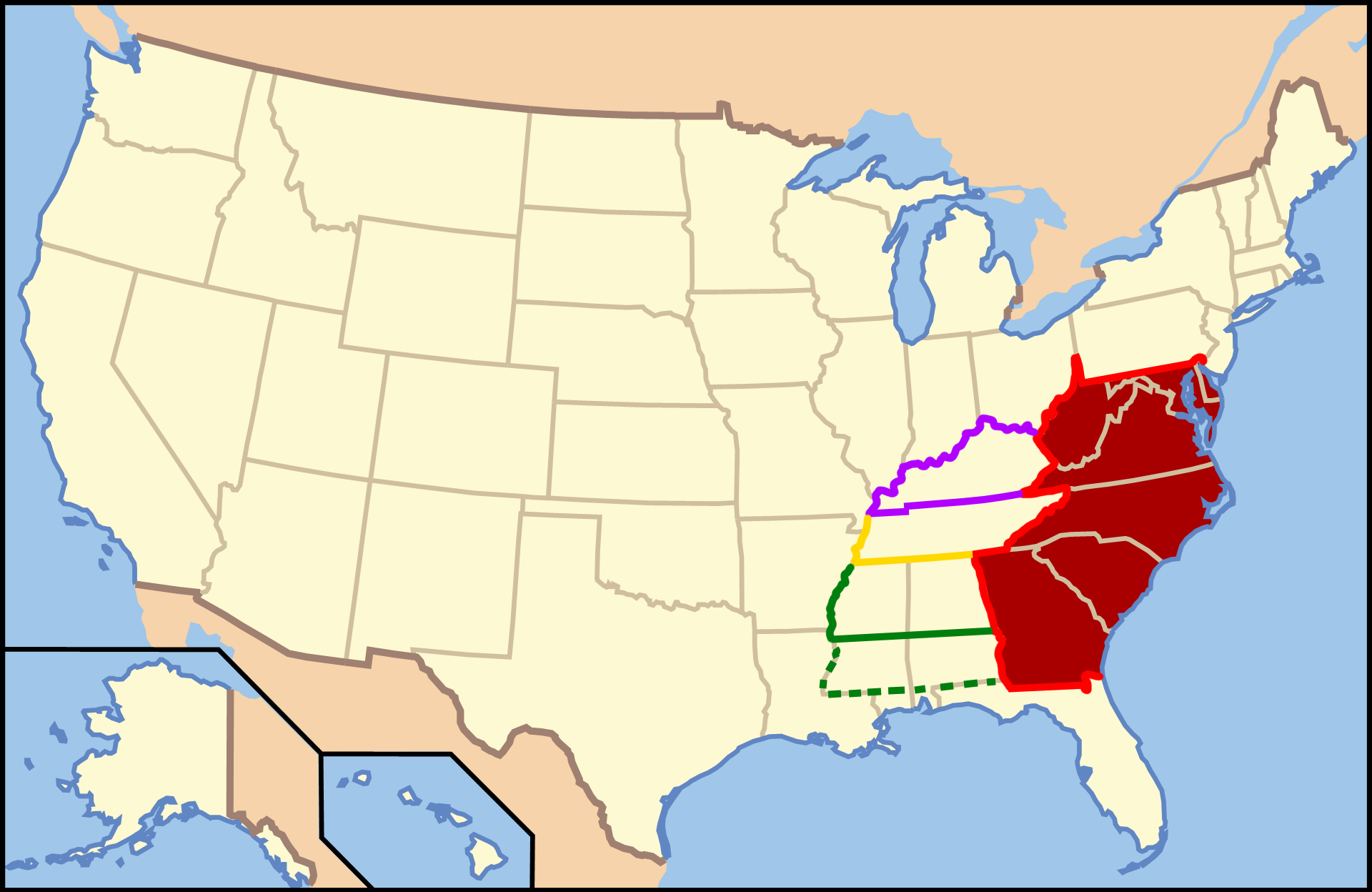
Regional definitions vary from source to source. Geographically, the states shown in dark red are usually included, though their modern boundaries differ from the boundaries when a part of the Thirteen Colonies. Those borders are shown on the map.

Geographically, the U.S. states known as the Old South are those in the Southern United States that were among the original Thirteen Colonies. The region term is differentiated from the Deep South, Mid-South, and Upper South. From a cultural and social standpoint, "the Old South" is used to describe the rural, agriculturally-based, slavery-reliant economy and society in the Antebellum South, prior to the American Civil War (1861–65), in contrast to the "New South" of the post-Reconstruction Era.

== Culture ==
The social structure of the Old South was made an important research topic for scholars by Ulrich Bonnell Phillips in the early 20th century. The romanticized image of the "Old South" tells of its plantations, as famously typified in Gone with the Wind, a blockbuster 1936 novel and its adaptation in a 1939 Hollywood film, along with the animated Disney film, Song of the South (1946).

Historians in recent decades have paid much more attention to the enslaved people of the South and the world they made for themselves. To a lesser extent, they have also studied the poor subsistence farmers, known as "yeoman farmers", who owned little property and no slaves.

== Politics ==
The Old South had a vigorous two-party system, with the Whigs being the strongest in towns, in the business community, and in upscale plantation areas. The slightly more numerous Democrats were strongest among common farmers and poor western districts. After the end of Reconstruction in 1877, black Republicans were largely disenfranchised, leaving the Republican Party a small element based mainly in remote mountain districts within the South. The region was now called "the Solid South", where Southern states would mainly vote Democrat, and lasted through the 1964 presidential election.

== Religion ==
Historians have explored the religiosity of the Old South in some detail. Before the American Revolution, the Church of England was established in some areas, especially Virginia and South Carolina. However, the colonists refused to allow any Anglican bishops, and instead established a practicing layman as head of the vestry in each Anglican church, which then allowed for policy determinations as if the parish were a unit of local government. Thus it handled community issues such as welfare, cemeteries, and local infrastructure.

The Church of England's presence in the United States was disestablished during the American Revolutionary War under the leadership of people such as Thomas Jefferson and James Madison. The 18th century had the First Great Awakening, while the early 19th century saw the Second Great Awakening make a powerful influence across the region, especially with poor whites but also with black slaves. The result was the establishment of many Methodist and Baptist churches. In the antebellum period, large numbers of open air revivals converted new members and strengthened the resolve of established members. By contrast in the North, revivals sparked a strong interest in abolition of slavery, a forbidden topic south of the Mason–Dixon line.

Additionally, during the antebellum period, social issues such as public schools and prohibition, which grew rapidly in the North, made little headway in the South. Most Southern church members used their religion for intense group solidarity, which often involved intimate examinations of the sins and failures of their fellow parishioners. At a deeper level, religion served as a temporary relief, with a promised permanent relief from all the hardships and oppressions of this world. Missionary activity was a controversial issue in the South, with strong support for missionaries mostly among the Methodists, while the Baptists vacillated between movements for and against missionary activity.

== Honor ==
Historian Bertram Wyatt-Brown has emphasized how a very strong sense of honor, rooted in European traditions, shaped ethical behavior for men in the Old South. The rigid unwritten code guided family and gender relationships and helped provide a structure for social control. A highly controversial aspect of the honor system was the necessity to fight in duels, under rigidly prescribed conditions, whenever a man's honor was challenged by an equal. If one's honor was challenged by an inferior person, it sufficed to beat him up. Men had the duty of protecting the honor of their women as well. Honor became an important ingredient in differentiating manhood versus effeminacy and patriarchy versus companionate marriage. College authorities strictly forbade violent duels. In response, undergraduates revised the code, dropping the duels, and set up a system whereby fellow students would dictate punishment when misconduct violated college rules or the code of honor. By claiming such control over their college environment, students reshaped the honor code and bridged the awkward gap between dependence and independent adulthood. So many talented people were being killed that anti-dueling associations were organized which challenged the honor code.

== Old South Day ==
Since 1976, the city of Ochlocknee, Georgia has celebrated 'Old South Day' in November each year.

== See also ==
- American gentry
- Culture of the Southern United States
- History of the Southern United States
- Solid South
- South Atlantic States
