= Arcadia, Indiana =

- Town
- Arcadia
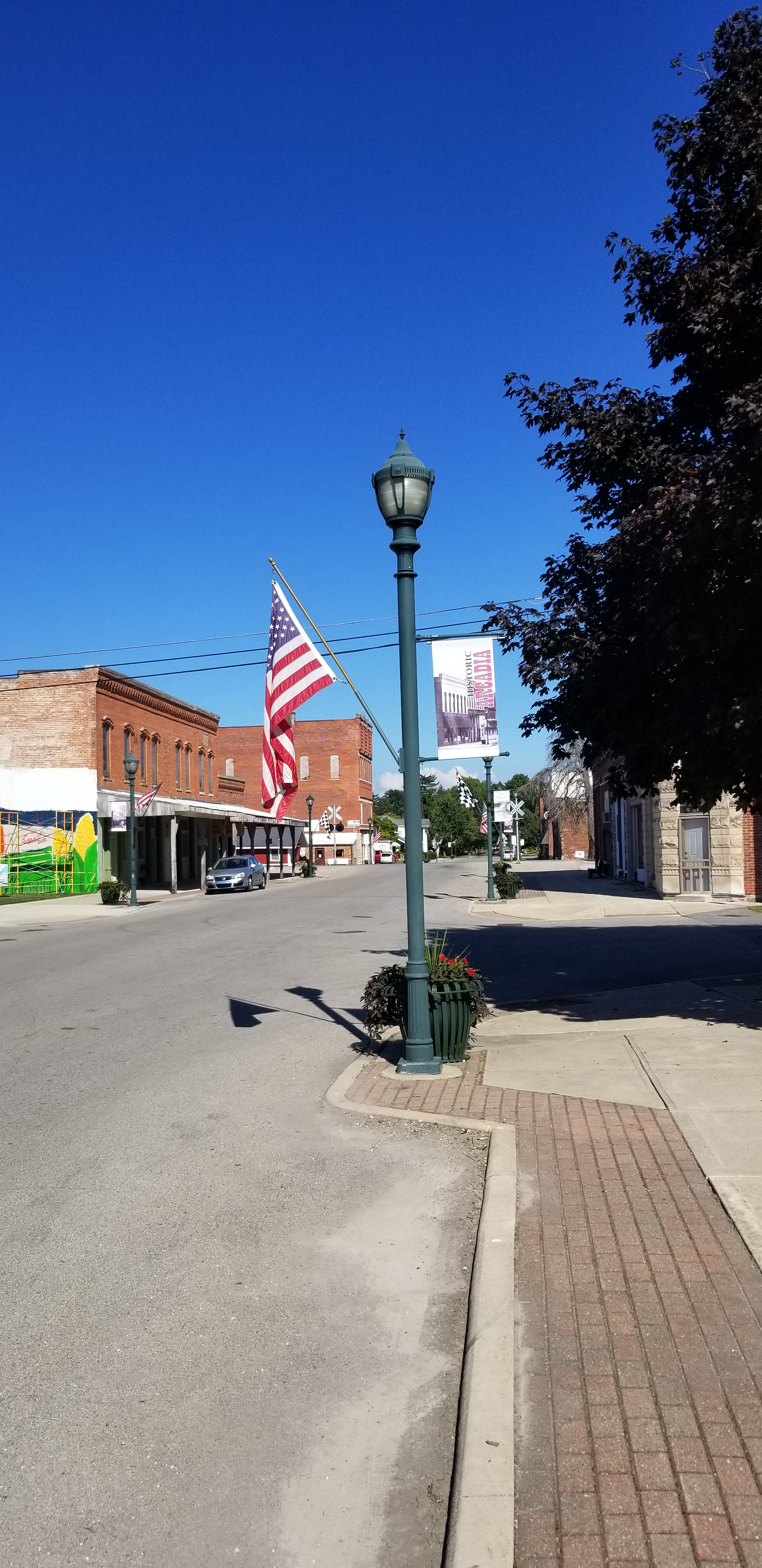

- Logo
- Motto: “Where small town America still exists.”
- Location of Arcadia in Hamilton County, Indiana.
- Coordinates: 40°10′27″N 86°01′16″W
- Country: United States
- State: Indiana
- County: Hamilton
- Township: Jackson
- Founded: 1849
- Named after: Arcadia, Greece

Government
  - Clerk/Treasurer: Jennifer Pickett

Area
  - Total: 0.55 sq mi (1.43 km^{2})
  - Land: 0.55 sq mi (1.43 km^{2})
  - Water: 0 sq mi (0.00 km^{2})
- Elevation: 856 ft (261 m)

Population (2020)
  - Total: 1,515
  - Density: 2,750/sq mi (1,061.7/km^{2})
- Time zone: UTC−5 (EST)
  - Summer (DST): UTC−5 (EST)
- ZIP code: 46030
- Area code: 317, 463
- FIPS code: 18-01954
- GNIS feature ID: 2397435
- Website: www.arcadiaindiana.org

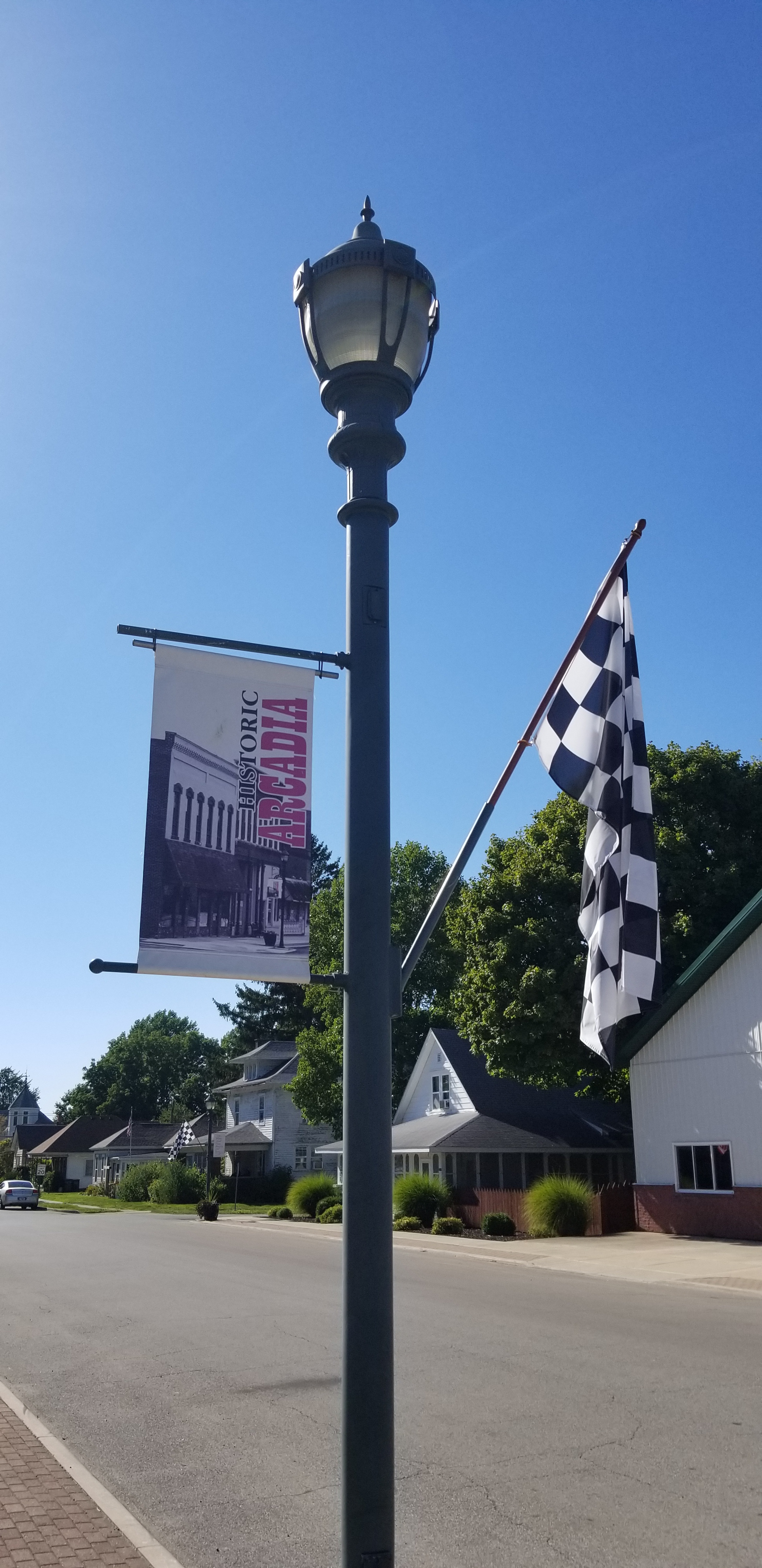
Arcadia Indiana street lamp and banner

Arcadia is a town in Jackson Township, Hamilton County, Indiana, United States. The population was 1,515 at the 2020 census.

== History ==
Settlers began to move into the area as early as 1833, when Hencil Bartholomew bought property near present-day Arcadia, and other settlers quickly followed. On December 12, 1836, John and Harriet Shaffer bought 160 acres of land adjacent to a plot owned by Daniel and Matilda Waltz, which was later to become the heart of downtown Arcadia.

=== Railroad ===
On January 18, 1846, the Peru and Indianapolis Railroad (P&I) was incorporated to construct and operate a line from Peru, Indiana, to Indianapolis to connect with the Jeffersonville, Madison and Indianapolis Railroad (JMI). By 1849 the town was laid out when the railroad had surveyed a route across the land owned by Shaffer and Waltz, and a year later in 1850, the two men donated the land on which the town was founded, which was plotted the next year by Isaac Martz. According to tradition, the town was originally to be named "Shaltz", combining the names of the two men Shaffer and Waltz, but the official naming was left up to Judge Jeremiah Smith, who called it Arcadia, after the ancient region of Greece. The Arcadia post office opened in 1852. At this time, the site was heavily wooded, and described as "low" and marshy. After the town was laid out, the woods were cleared and streets paved with gravel, and their upkeep was paid for by a toll of 10 cents for a horse and buggy and 12 cents for a horse and wagon. The land was drained by two large open ditches, later spanned by crude log bridges. Early sidewalks were raised wooden platforms, later replaced by gravel and sawdust.

=== Manufacturing and Industry ===
By 1852, the railroad was complete, which included a north and south road constructed by the railroad which ran from Indianapolis to Peru, Indiana. Immediately Arcadia enjoyed steady growth as a farming community, and attracted a wide variety of businesses, which in the early years included a cigar factory, a cabinet shop, a flour and sawmill, and a planing mill to manufacture building materials.

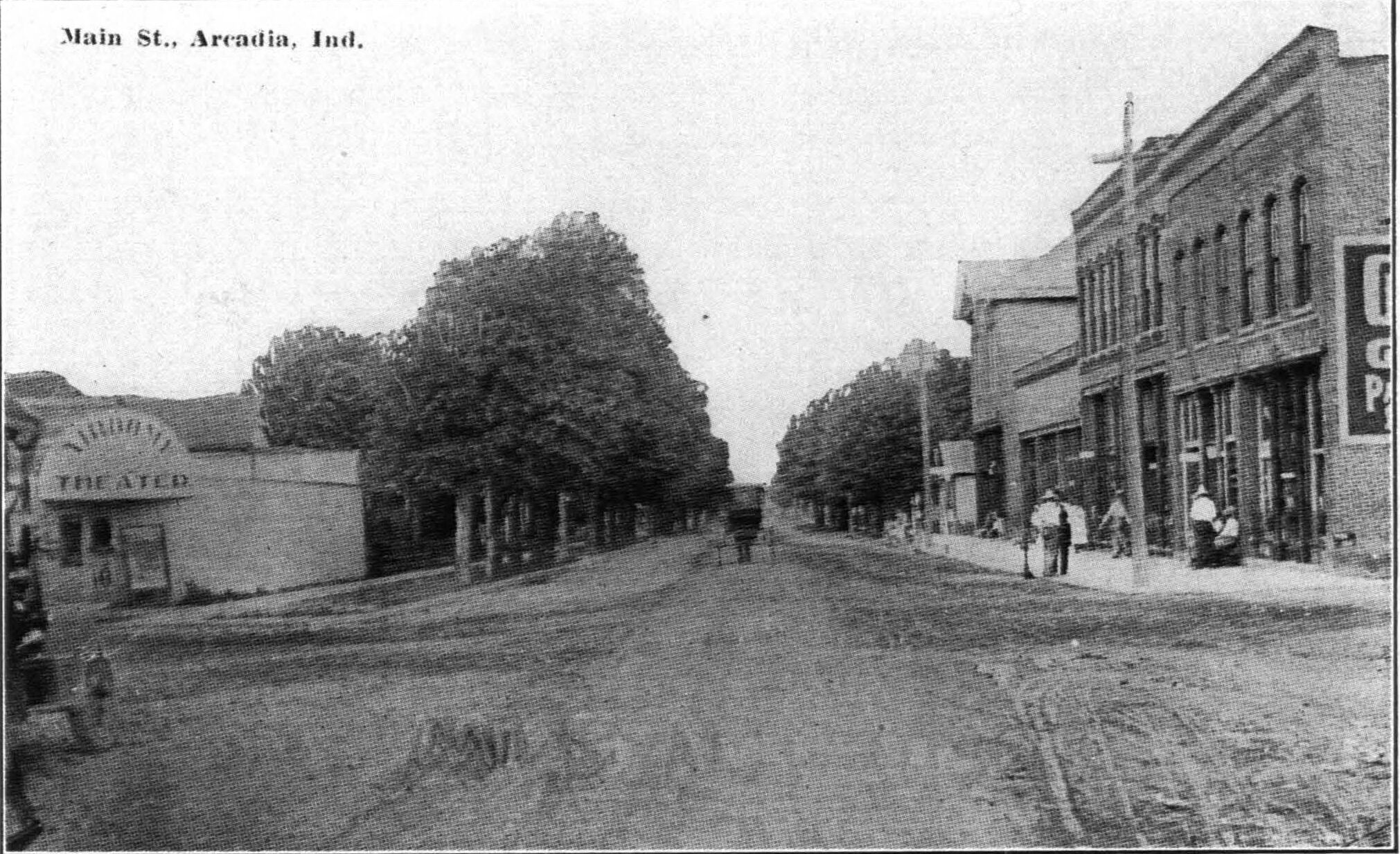
Street Scene in Arcadia, 1915

The town continued to attract new businesses through the end of the century. By the 1880s the town included a wagon shop, a drug store, a butcher shop, a hardware store, and a number of dry goods and grocery stores, a furniture store, an undertaker, and two grain elevators. In 1888, the Frankfort Oil and Gas Company drilled for natural gas and struck a vein which ran from Arcadia and to the southwest for some six miles, which caused a small boom in industry. By 1880, eastern factories had used most of the timber they needed for fuel, and were moving west where coal was plentiful, but natural gas allowed them to fire kilns used in glass and brick manufacturing. A brick plant was opened by George Walters and B. P. Hollett, which supplied brick for miles up and down the Erie Railroad, using clay from nearby land. The Baker Glass Company moved operations from Findley, Ohio in 1894, using gas donated by the town, and later the Flint House Glass Company set up a factory to manufacture lamp chimneys. In 1898, the Arcadia Cheese Factory was opened by E. Wiles and John Burris, manufacturing an average of 200 lbs. of cheese a day. In about 1890, the first creamery was established in Arcadia by Toll Driver.

=== Educational history ===
As early as 1840, a school of hewed logs was built on wooded property donated by Moses Martz. School terms lasted three months, financed by private subscriptions of $1.50 per pupil.

== Geography ==
According to the 2020 census, Arcadia has a total area of 0.551 square miles (1.43 km^{2}), all land.

== Demographics ==
Historical population
Census	Pop.	Note	%±
1880	433		—
1890	670		54.7%
1900	1,413		110.9%
1910	990		−29.9%
1920	1,060		7.1%
1930	912		−14.0%
1940	968		6.1%
1950	1,073		10.8%
1960	1,271		18.5%
1970	1,338		5.3%
1980	1,801		34.6%
1990	1,468		−18.5%
2000	1,747		19.0%
2010	1,666		−4.6%
2020	1,515		−9.1%
U.S. Decennial Census

=== 2020 census ===
As of the 2020 census, Arcadia had a population of 1,515. The median age was 39.5 years. 25.8% of residents were under the age of 18 and 15.0% of residents were 65 years of age or older. For every 100 females there were 96.2 males, and for every 100 females age 18 and over there were 94.5 males age 18 and over.

100.0% of residents lived in urban areas, while 0.0% lived in rural areas.

There were 617 households in Arcadia, of which 33.4% had children under the age of 18 living in them. Of all households, 47.8% were married-couple households, 18.2% were households with a male householder and no spouse or partner present, and 26.1% were households with a female householder and no spouse or partner present. About 27.8% of all households were made up of individuals and 11.4% had someone living alone who was 65 years of age or older.

There were 667 housing units, of which 7.5% were vacant. The homeowner vacancy rate was 1.8% and the rental vacancy rate was 8.5%.

Racial composition as of the 2020 census
Race	Number	Percent
White	1,394	92.0%
Black or African American	10	0.7%
American Indian and Alaska Native	11	0.7%
Asian	2	0.1%
Native Hawaiian and Other Pacific Islander	0	0.0%
Some other race	8	0.5%
Two or more races	90	5.9%
Hispanic or Latino (of any race)	39	2.6%

=== 2010 census ===
As of the 2010 census, there were 1,666 people, 612 households, and 427 families living in the town. The population density was 2,975.0 inhabitants per square mile (1,148.7/km^{2}). There were 683 housing units at an average density of 1,219.6 per square mile (470.9/km^{2}). The racial makeup of the town was 97.7% White, 0.4% African American, 0.2% Native American, 0.2% Asian, 0.2% from other races, and 1.2% from two or more races. Hispanic or Latino of any race were 0.8% of the population.

There were 612 households, of which 39.7% had children under the age of 18 living with them, 49.3% were married couples living together, 12.7% had a female householder with no husband present, 7.7% had a male householder with no wife present, and 30.2% were non-families. 24.7% of all households were made up of individuals, and 11.3% had someone living alone who was 65 years of age or older. The average household size was 2.62 and the average family size was 3.07.

The median age in the town was 36 years. 27.9% of residents were under the age of 18; 8.7% were between the ages of 18 and 24; 27.3% were from 25 to 44; 23.3% were from 45 to 64; and 12.5% were 65 years of age or older. The gender makeup of the town was 49.9% male and 50.1% female.

=== 2000 census ===
As of the 2000 census, there were 1,747 people, 582 households, and 427 families living in the town. The population density was 3,176.1 inhabitants per square mile (1,226.3/km^{2}). There were 607 housing units at an average density of 1,103.5 per square mile (426.1/km^{2}). The racial makeup of the town was 96.22% White, 0.92% African American, 0.57% Native American, 0.23% Asian, 0.52% from other races, and 1.55% from two or more races. Hispanic or Latino of any race were 1.09% of the population.

There were 582 households, out of which 38.3% had children under the age of 18 living with them, 57.9% were married couples living together, 9.3% had a female householder with no husband present, and 26.6% were non-families. 22.0% of all households were made up of individuals, and 7.9% had someone living alone who was 65 years of age or older. The average household size was 2.67 and the average family size was 3.11.

In the town, the population was spread out, with 26.8% under the age of 18, 7.3% from 18 to 24, 34.9% from 25 to 44, 20.8% from 45 to 64, and 10.3% who were 65 years of age or older. The median age was 35 years. For every 100 females, there were 101.7 males. For every 100 females age 18 and over, there were 96.5 males.

The median income for a household in the town was $44,063, and the median income for a family was $48,833. Males had a median income of $35,435 versus $25,313 for females. The per capita income for the town was $17,159. About 6.0% of families and 10.5% of the population were below the poverty line, including 7.6% of those under age 18 and 12.5% of those age 65 or over.

== Education ==
Hamilton Heights School Corporation (K-12) includes all of the municipality. The high school competes in the Mid-Indiana Conference (MIC) for athletics.
