= Carthage, Indiana =

- Town
- Town of Carthage
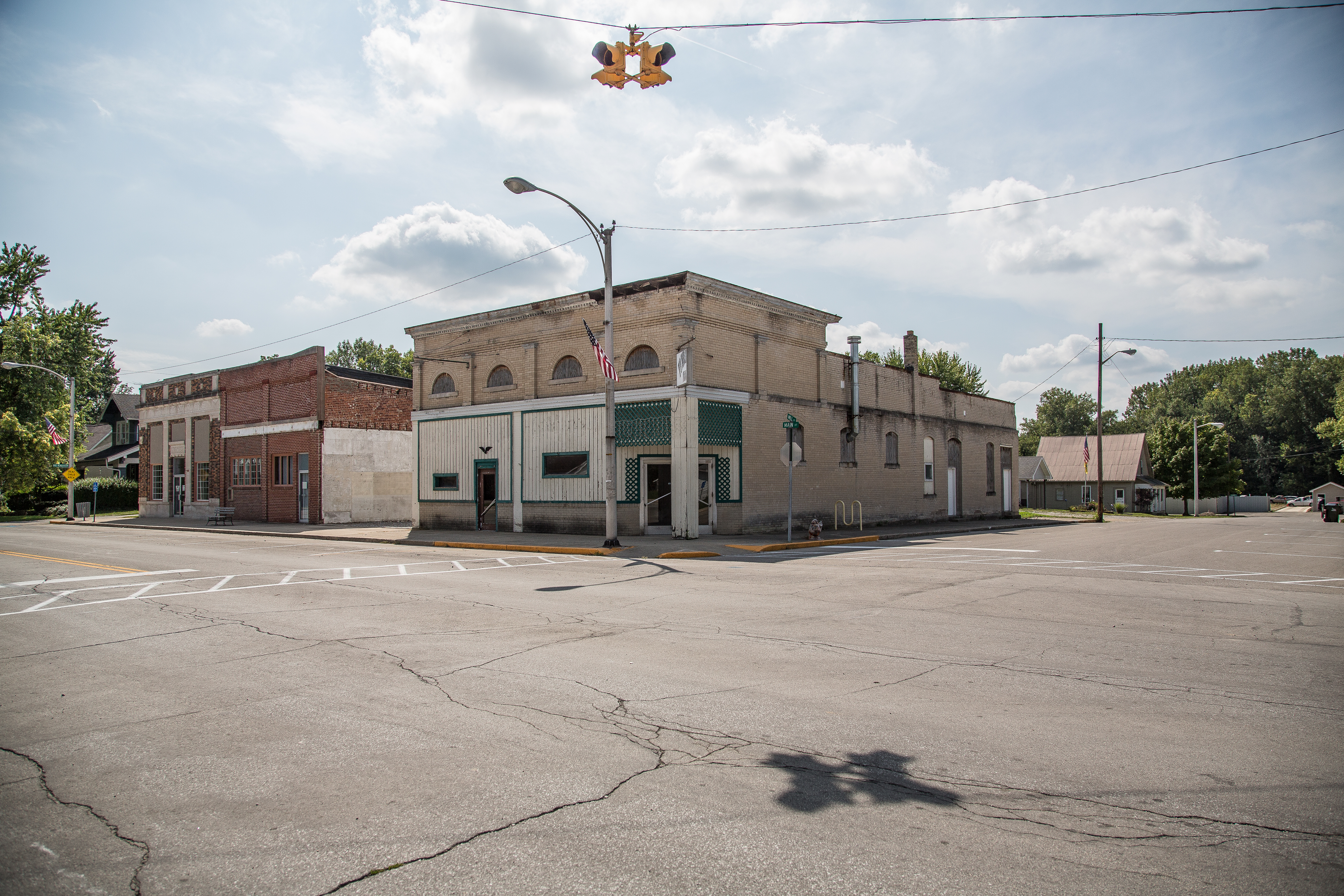

- Location of Carthage in Rush County, Indiana.
- Coordinates: 39°44′13″N 85°34′17″W
- Country: United States
- State: Indiana
- County: Rush
- Township: Ripley

Area
  - Total: 0.56 sq mi (1.46 km^{2})
  - Land: 0.56 sq mi (1.46 km^{2})
  - Water: 0 sq mi (0.00 km^{2})
- Elevation: 879 ft (268 m)

Population (2020)
  - Total: 918
  - Density: 1,624/sq mi (627.1/km^{2})
- Time zone: UTC-5 (EST)
  - Summer (DST): UTC-5 (EST)
- ZIP code: 46115
- Area code: 765
- FIPS code: 18-10612
- GNIS feature ID: 2396629
- Website: carthagein.net

Carthage is a town in Ripley Township, Rush County, Indiana, United States, located along the Big Blue River. As of the 2020 census, Carthage had a population of 918.

== History ==
Carthage was platted in 1834. The town was named after Carthage, North Carolina. A post office has been in operation at Carthage since 1835.

The Henry Henley Public Library was listed on the National Register of Historic Places in 2016.

== Geography ==
According to the 2010 census, Carthage has a total area of 0.58 square miles (1.50 km^{2}), all land.

== Education ==
The town is served by the Charles A. Beard Memorial School Corporation school district, based at Knightstown in Henry County to the north. Local elementary students attended Carthage Elementary School until its closure in 2014.

The town has a lending library, the Henry Henley Public Library, one of two public libraries in Rush County.

== Demographics ==
Historical population
Census	Pop.	Note	%±
1870	481		—
1880	500		4.0%
1890	482		−3.6%
1900	1,028		113.3%
1910	873		−15.1%
1920	902		3.3%
1930	931		3.2%
1940	937		0.6%
1950	1,065		13.7%
1960	1,043		−2.1%
1970	946		−9.3%
1980	886		−6.3%
1990	887		0.1%
2000	928		4.6%
2010	927		−0.1%
2020	918		−1.0%
U.S. Decennial Census

=== 2010 census ===
As of the census of 2010, there were 927 people, 351 households, and 251 families living in the town. The population density was 1,598.3 inhabitants per square mile (617.1/km^{2}). There were 411 housing units at an average density of 708.6 per square mile (273.6/km^{2}). The racial makeup of the town was 98.6% White, 0.2% Native American, 0.2% Asian, and 1.0% from two or more races. Hispanic or Latino of any race were 0.3% of the population.

There were 351 households, of which 39.6% had children under the age of 18 living with them, 49.9% were married couples living together, 15.4% had a female householder with no husband present, 6.3% had a male householder with no wife present, and 28.5% were non-families. 25.4% of all households were made up of individuals, and 11.1% had someone living alone who was 65 years of age or older. The average household size was 2.64 and the average family size was 3.10.

The median age in the town was 37.3 years. 28.2% of residents were under the age of 18; 6.9% were between the ages of 18 and 24; 26.5% were from 25 to 44; 26.6% were from 45 to 64; and 11.8% were 65 years of age or older. The gender makeup of the town was 49.9% male and 50.1% female.

=== 2000 census ===
As of the census of 2000, there were 928 people, 373 households, and 255 families living in the town. The population density was 1,616.3 inhabitants per square mile (624.1/km^{2}). There were 391 housing units at an average density of 681.0 per square mile (262.9/km^{2}). The racial makeup of the town was 97.95% White, 0.22% Native American, 1.08% from other races, and 0.75% from two or more races. Hispanic or Latino of any race were 1.51% of the population.

There were 373 households, out of which 36.2% had children under the age of 18 living with them, 58.2% were married couples living together, 7.2% had a female householder with no husband present, and 31.6% were non-families. 27.9% of all households were made up of individuals, and 16.1% had someone living alone who was 65 years of age or older. The average household size was 2.49 and the average family size was 3.03.

In the town, the population was spread out, with 26.6% under the age of 18, 8.1% from 18 to 24, 31.9% from 25 to 44, 19.6% from 45 to 64, and 13.8% who were 65 years of age or older. The median age was 36 years. For every 100 females there were 95.4 males. For every 100 females age 18 and over, there were 91.8 males.

The median income for a household in the town was $35,417, and the median income for a family was $40,333. Males had a median income of $31,618 versus $21,875 for females. The per capita income for the town was $15,598. About 6.0% of families and 7.2% of the population were below the poverty line, including 5.1% of those under age 18 and 13.3% of those age 65 or over.

== Notable people ==
- Ione Virginia Hill Cowles (1858–1940), clubwoman, social leader
