= Indiana State Road 109 =

State highway in Indiana, United States

State Road 109
- SR 109 highlighted in red

Route information
- Maintained by INDOT
- Length: 31.769 mi (51.127 km)
- Existed: 1934–present

Southern segment
- Length: 20.129 mi (32.394 km)
- South end: US 40 in Knightstown
- Major intersections: I-70 near Knightstown; US 36 near Markleville
- North end: I-69 / SR 9 / SR 67 in Anderson

Northern segment
- Length: 11.640 mi (18.733 km)
- South end: US 30 in Columbia City
- North end: US 33 in Wolf Lake

Location
- Country: United States
- State: Indiana

Highway system
- Indiana State Highway System; Interstate; US; State; Scenic
← SR 106	→ SR 110

State Road 109 (SR 109) is a north–south discontinuous State Road in the US state of Indiana. The southern segment of the highway runs from U.S. Route 40 (US 40) in the town of Knightstown north to SR 9 in Anderson. The northern segment of SR 109 runs from US 30 in Columbia City northerly to US 33 in Wolf Lake. The total length of the highway is 31.769 miles (51.127 km), including the southern segment which is 20.129 miles (32.394 km) and the northern segment at 11.640 miles (18.733 km). The first usage of the SR 109 designation dates back to 1934 with the original routing being between Columbia City and Wolf Lake. A southern section was added in 1940 between Knightstown and the Hancock–Madison County line. The southern segment was lengthened in the early 1940s and once again in the early 1950s extending the road north to just north of Anderson. The northern segment of SR 109 was shortened in Columbia City during the early 1970s. SR 109 in Madison County was moved to a new routing in the late 1990s.

== Route description ==
=== Southern section ===
The southern segment of SR 109 begins at an intersection between Main Street (US 40) and McCullum Street in the town of Knightstown. SR 109 heads north along McCullum Street before leaving the town limits and curving towards the northwest. The road has an interchange with Interstate 70 (I–70) in rural Henry County. SR 109 enters Hancock County passing through the town of Wilkinson. After Wilkinson, SR 109 has a four-way stop with SR 234, before entering Warrington. In Warrington the road becomes north–south once again, passing through rural Hancock County, before entering Madison County. SR 109 passes through a four-way stop with SR 38, west of Markleville, before an intersection with US 36. North of US 36, SR 109 parallels a CSX railroad track, before crossing over the railroad tracks south of Anderson. The northern terminus is at the intersection of SR 9 with I–69 (exit 26) in Anderson.

=== Northern section ===
The northern section of SR 109 starts in Columbia City at the corner of US 30 and Line Street. It heads north leaving Columbia City and entering rural Whitley County. The roadway leaves Whitley County and enters Noble County. In Noble County SR 109 passes through the community of Big Lake, before entering rural Noble County. The state road passes east of Merry Lea environmental learning center and Bear Lake, before curving northeasterly towards the community of Wolf Lake. The state highway designation for SR 109 terminates at an intersection with US 33 and Market Street, where Market Street continues northeast.

== History ==
The Indiana State Highway Commission authorized a state road following modern SR 109, between Columbia City and Wolf Lake, in 1934. Construction started in 1935 on the authorized segment with it being completed by 1942. A segment of state road was commissioned, between Knightstown and the Hancock–Madison County line, in March 1940. This section of roadway was originally planned as SR 7, but became a southern segment of SR 109. The northern end of the southern segment was moved north to SR 32 in Anderson in July 1941. Between late 1950 and early 1951 the northern end of the southern segment was moved north to an intersection with SR 9, just north of Anderson. The southern end of the northern segment was moved north to an intersection with the new alignment of US 30, just north of Columbia City, in late 1970 or early 1971. A new alignment for SR 109, from south of US 36 to Anderson, was constructed between 1997 and 1999.

== Major intersections ==
County	Location	mi	km	Destinations	Notes
Henry	Knightstown	0.000	0.000	US 40 – Greenfield, Richmond	Southern terminus of SR 109
Henry	Wayne Township	3.517– 3.707	5.660– 5.966	I-70 – Indianapolis, Columbus	Exit number 115 on I-70
Hancock	Brown Township	9.346	15.041	SR 234 – New Castle, McCordsville	
Madison	Adams Township	14.991	24.126	SR 38 – Pendleton, New Castle, Markleville	
Madison	Adams Township	16.570	26.667	US 36 – Pendleton, Lynn	
Madison	Anderson	20.129	32.394	I-69 / SR 9 / SR 67 – Indianapolis, Fort Wayne	Northern terminus of the southern section of SR 109
Gap in route
Whitley	Columbia City	20.129	32.394	US 30 – Fort Wayne, Warsaw	Southern terminus of the northern section of SR 109
Noble	Wolf Lake	31.769	51.127	US 33 – Elkhart, Fort Wayne	Northern terminus of SR 109
1.000 mi = 1.609 km; 1.000 km = 0.621 mi
