= Stringtown, Hancock County, Indiana =

- Unincorporated community
- Location within Indiana Location within the United States
- Coordinates: 39°47′17″N 85°42′29″W
- Country: United States
- State: Indiana
- County: Hancock
- Township: Center
- Elevation: 912 ft (278 m)
- ZIP code: 46140
- FIPS code: 18-73736
- GNIS feature ID: 444271

Stringtown is an unincorporated community split between Center Township, Blue River Township and Jackson Township in Hancock County, Indiana.
