= Indiana State Road 234 =

State highway in Indiana, United States

State Road 234
- SR 234 highlighted in red

Route information
- Maintained by INDOT
- Length: 79.849 mi (128.505 km)
- Existed: 1931–present

Western segment
- Length: 53.504 mi (86.106 km)
- West end: Illinois state line
- Major intersections: SR 63 in Cayuga; US 41 near Kingman; US 231 near New Market
- East end: US 136 / SR 75 in Jamestown

Eastern segment
- Length: 26.345 mi (42.398 km)
- West end: US 36 / SR 67 in McCordsville
- East end: SR 38 near Westwood

Location
- Country: United States
- State: Indiana
- Counties: Boone, Fountain, Hancock, Henry, Montgomery, Parke, Vermillion

Highway system
- Indiana State Highway System; Interstate; US; State; Scenic
← SR 232	→ SR 235

State Road 234 exists in two sections in Indiana. The western portion begins at the Illinois border from a Vermilion County, Illinois, county road. It runs east from there to U.S. Route 136 (US 136) near Jamestown. Much of the route is a scenic, two-lane road with very tight turns. The primary access to Shades State Park is located along SR 234.

Its eastern portion goes from the U.S. Route 36/State Road 67 concurrency in McCordsville, Indiana. The eastern terminus is at an intersection with State Road 38.

== Route description ==
=== Western section ===
From the western terminus SR 234 heads east towards Cayuga. SR 234 passes through Cayuga and heads east towards Kingman. East of Kingman SR 234 has an intersection with U.S. Route 41. SR 234 heads east then southeast towards Ladoga, passing through intersections with State Road 341, State Road 47, and U.S. Route 231. SR 234 heads east towards Jamestown, where SR 234 has a concurrency with State Road 75. The concurrency end at the eastern terminus of the western section.

=== Eastern section ===
From US 36/SR 67, SR 234 heads due east towards Kennard, passing through intersection with State Road 9 and State Road 109. SR 234 heads north out of Kennard, 2 miles (3.2 km) north of Kennard SR 234 turns east. The eastern terminus is soon after at SR 38.

== History ==
A middle section of SR 234 existed in Indiana between SR 37 in Noblesville, Indiana, and SR 267 in Boone County, Indiana. Its primary job was to provide cities and towns across the northern side of Greater Indianapolis with heavy commerce, but also served as a northern route between SR 37 and SR 267; however, with the advent of modern interstates, its designation was removed in the 1970s. Middle section of SR 234 started at SR 37 in Noblesville, Indiana. It ran west along 146th Street, so as to utilize that bridge over the White River, then turned south on River Road until it reached 116th Street. At that point, it turned west again and proceeded through Carmel, then Zionsville, and ended on SR 267. Because of its proximity to many places, it supplied heavy commerce to areas such as Noblesville, Fishers, Carmel, Homeplace, Zionsville, Whitestown and Fayette. Many locals still use the old route to avoid the traffic of heavy commerce.

== Major intersections ==
County	Location	mi	km	Destinations	Notes
Vermillion	Eugene Township	0.000	0.000	Illinois state line	Western terminus of SR 234
Vermillion	Cayuga	4.657	7.495	SR 63 – Newport, I–74	
Parke	No major junctions				
Fountain	Millcreek Township	16.472	26.509	US 41 – Rockville, Veedersburg	
Fountain	Jackson Township	21.474	34.559	SR 341 north – Wallace	Southern terminus of SR 341
Montgomery	Brown Township	34.024	54.756	SR 47 – Waveland, Crawfordsville	
Montgomery	Scott Township	37.828	60.878	US 231 – Greencastle, Crawfordsville	
Boone–Hendricks county line	Jamestown	53.055	85.384	SR 75 south – North Salem	Western end of SR 75 concurrency
Boone	Jamestown	53.504	86.106	US 136 / SR 75 north to I-74 – Indianapolis, Crawfordsville	eastern end of SR 75 concurrency; eastern terminus of the western section of SR 234
Gap in route
Hancock	Vernon Township	53.505	86.108	US 36 / SR 67	Western terminus of the eastern section of SR 234
Hancock	Eden	61.728	99.342	SR 9 – Greenfield, Pendleton	
Hancock	Warrington	68.738	110.623	SR 109 – Knightstown, Anderson, Wilkinson	
Henry	Westwood	79.850	128.506	SR 38	Eastern terminus of SR 234
1.000 mi = 1.609 km; 1.000 km = 0.621 mi: Concurrency terminus
