= Green Township, Hancock County, Indiana =

Green Township
- Township
- Location in Hancock County
- Coordinates: 39°54′17″N 85°44′45″W
- Country: United States
- State: Indiana
- County: Hancock

Government
  - Type: Indiana township

Area
  - Total: 30.36 sq mi (78.6 km^{2})
  - Land: 30.24 sq mi (78.3 km^{2})
  - Water: 0.12 sq mi (0.31 km^{2}) 0.40%
- Elevation: 879 ft (268 m)

Population (2020)
  - Total: 1,635
  - Density: 55/sq mi (21/km^{2})
- GNIS feature ID: 0453341
- Website: www.greentwp-hancockcountyin.gov

Green Township is one of nine townships in Hancock County, Indiana, United States. As of the 2010 census, its population was 1,662 and it contained 663 housing units.

== History ==
Green Township was organized in 1832. It was named for John Green, a pioneer settler.

== Geography ==
According to the 2010 census, the township has a total area of 30.36 square miles (78.6 km^{2}), of which 30.24 square miles (78.3 km^{2}) (or 99.60%) is land and 0.12 square miles (0.31 km^{2}) (or 0.40%) is water.

=== Unincorporated towns ===
- Eden
- Milners Corner

(This list is based on USGS data and may include former settlements.)

=== Adjacent townships ===
- Fall Creek Township, Madison County (north)
- Brown Township (east)
- Jackson Township (southeast)
- Center Township (south)
- Vernon Township (west)
- Green Township, Madison County (northwest)

=== Cemeteries ===
The township contains four cemeteries: Chappell, Cook, Olvey and Wynn.

=== Major highways ===
- Indiana State Road 9
- Indiana State Road 234
