= Tailholt, Indiana =

Tailholt was a former name of two settlements in the U.S. state of Indiana:

- Finly, Indiana in Hancock County
- Pickard, Indiana in Clinton County
