= Jane Ross Reeves Octagon House =

Historic house in Indiana, United States

- U.S. National Register of Historic Places
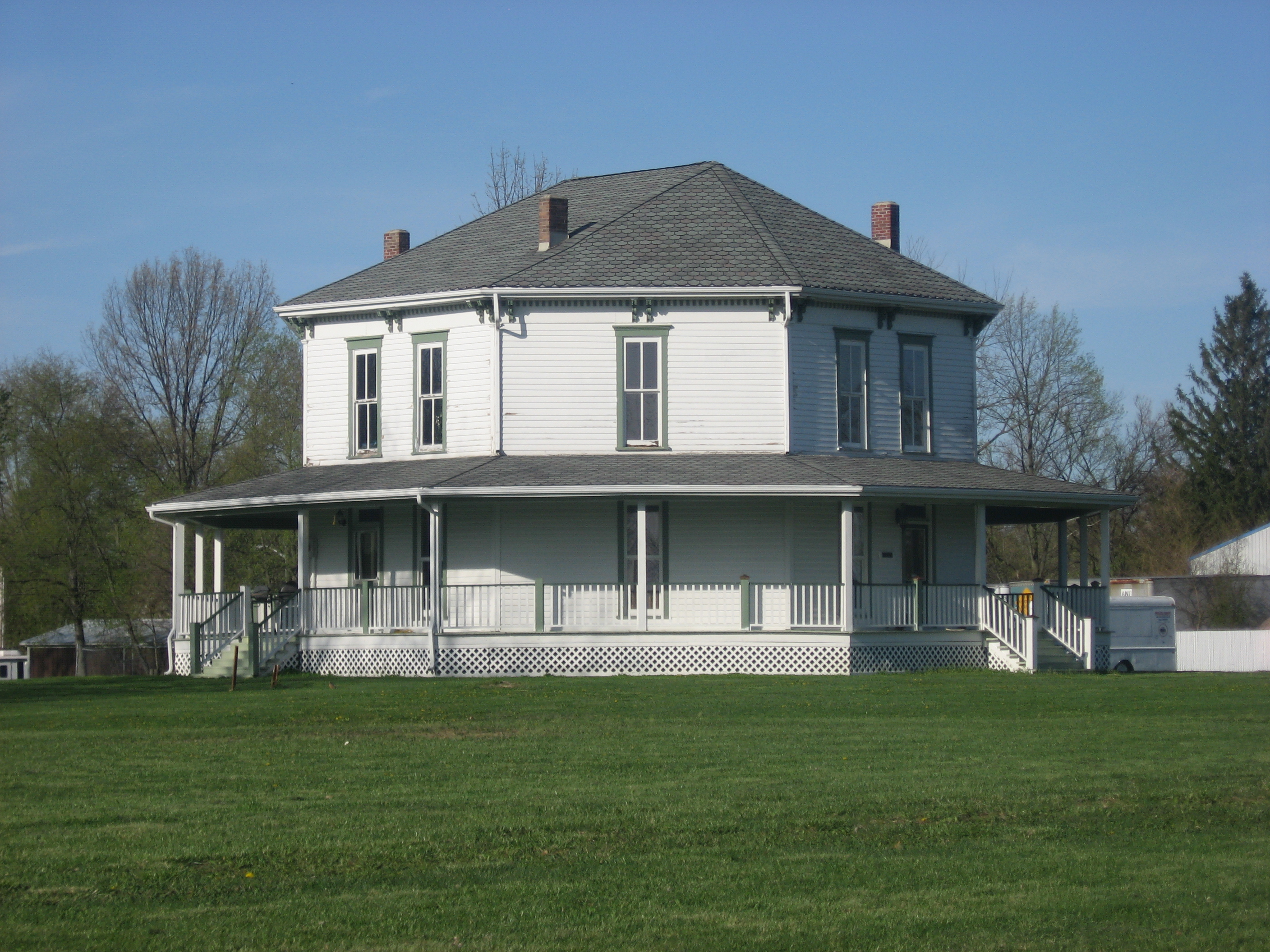
- Western, southwestern, and southern elevations of the Octagon House

- Location within Indiana Location within the United States
- Location: 400 Railroad Street, Shirley, Indiana
- Coordinates: 39°53′26″N 85°34′37″W
- Area: 4 acres (1.6 ha)
- Built: 1879
- Architect: Trehr & Brewster
- Architectural style: Octagon Mode
- NRHP reference No.: 01000620
- Added to NRHP: September 16, 2001

The Jane Ross Reeves Octagon House was originally located between Wilkinson, Indiana and Willow Branch, Indiana. It was moved to its present location in 1997. It is currently located at 400 Railroad Street in Shirley, Indiana.

When Jane and Elijah first homesteaded their farm, they built a log cabin on the highest point of the land. This was later replaced by a frame house which was torn down at the time the Octagon house was built. When the log cabin was built, two trees were planted in front of the house- one on each side of the gate. These were called wedding trees and as they grew, the two became one as their branches met in the middle. The one tree represented the groom and the second represented the bride. Two new trees were planted at the current location.

The Octagon house was built in 1879. In 1876, three years after her husband's death, Jane Ross Reeves found the plans in a magazine. She liked it so much she decided she had to have one. This house was built at a cost of somewhere between $2300 and $2500. It was built by a contracting company in Fortville, Indiana. When the house was completed, it was paid for in full from silver dollars that she (Jane Ross Reeves) had saved in a shoe box.

The house is two stories of wood frame construction with a pyramidal roof. The house has little architectural ornamentation. The house has 16 rooms and every room has a closet. There are four large rooms and four small rooms on each floor. When the house was moved, it was placed over a full basement. The basement has 10' ceilings and is 45' wide in every direction. Their house had four chimneys. One chimney serviced 4 rooms- 2 up and 2 down. The chimneys were removed to reduce weight when being moved. Even after their removal, the house still weighed 90 tons! The chimneys were rebuilt from the floor of the attic up to their original height so the house looks the same from the outside. The chimney chases were rebuilt on the inside of the house, so it looks exactly as it was originally built. These chases now contain the utilities. (wiring, plumbing, etc.)

There are only five octagon houses left standing in the state of Indiana. The Reeves Octagon House is deemed to be the most important one as it has never been altered or changed with the exception of the porch; it now goes around the entire house.
