= Buck Creek Township, Hancock County, Indiana =

Buck Creek Township
- Township
- Location in Hancock County
- Coordinates: 39°49′38″N 85°53′54″W
- Country: United States
- State: Indiana
- County: Hancock

Government
  - Type: Indiana township

Area
  - Total: 36.02 sq mi (93.3 km^{2})
  - Land: 35.93 sq mi (93.1 km^{2})
  - Water: 0.09 sq mi (0.23 km^{2}) 0.25%
- Elevation: 846 ft (258 m)

Population (2020)
  - Total: 9,304
  - Density: 234.6/sq mi (90.6/km^{2})
- GNIS feature ID: 0453145
- Website: buckcreektownship.in.gov

Buck Creek Township is one of nine townships in Hancock County, Indiana, United States. As of the 2010 census, its population was 8,430 and it contained 3,158 housing units.

== History ==
Buck Creek Township was established in 1831. It was named from Buck Creek, its largest waterway.

Lockheed PV-2 Harpoon No. 37396 was listed on the National Register of Historic Places in 2009.

== Geography ==
According to the 2010 census, the township has a total area of 36.02 square miles (93.3 km^{2}), of which 35.93 square miles (93.1 km^{2}) (or 99.75%) is land and 0.09 square miles (0.23 km^{2}) (or 0.25%) is water. The streams of Amity Branch, Lead Creek and Snider Branch run through this township.

=== Cities and towns ===
- Cumberland (northeast half)

=== Unincorporated towns ===
- Mohawk
- Mount Comfort
- Pleasant Acres

(This list is based on USGS data and may include former settlements.)

=== Adjacent townships ===
- Vernon Township (north)
- Center Township (east)
- Sugar Creek Township (south)
- Warren Township, Marion County (southwest)
- Lawrence Township, Marion County (northwest)

=== Cemeteries ===
The township contains nine cemeteries: Arnett, Burris, Fish, Griffith, Mount Pleasant, Pet, Scotten, Snider and Steele.

=== Major highways ===
- Interstate 70

=== Airports and landing strips ===
- Indianapolis Regional Airport
