= Willow Branch =

Willow Branch is the branch of a willow.

Willow Branch may also refer to:

- Willow Branch, Indiana, an unincorporated community in Hancock County
- Willow Branch Township, Piatt County, Illinois
