= Maxwell, Indiana =

- Unincorporated community and Census-designated place
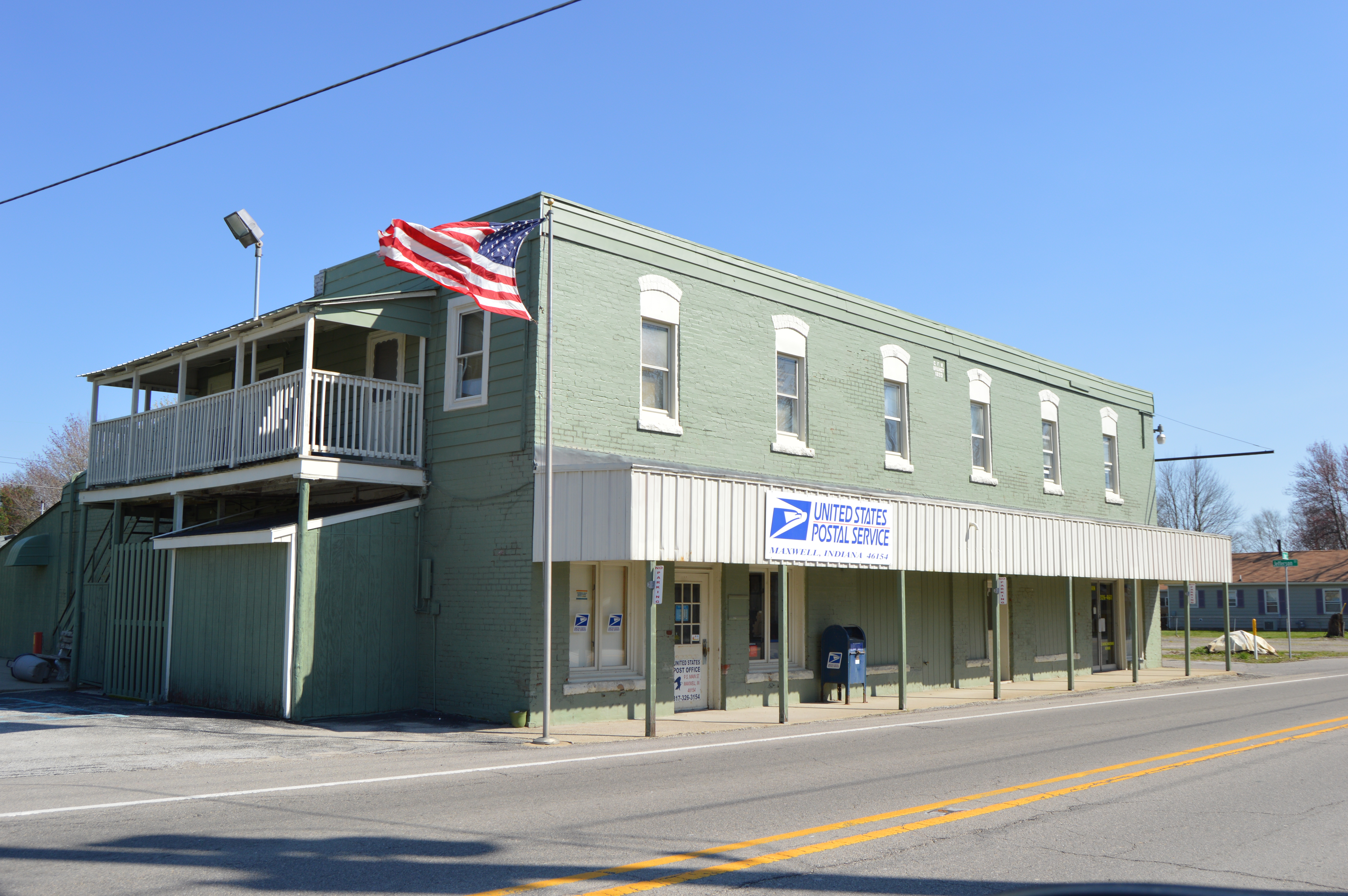
- Post office on State Road 9

- Location within Indiana Location within the United States
- Coordinates: 39°51′21″N 85°46′06″W
- Country: United States
- State: Indiana
- County: Hancock
- Township: Center
- Elevation: 912 ft (278 m)
- ZIP code: 46154
- FIPS code: 18-47736
- GNIS feature ID: 2830400

Maxwell is an unincorporated community in Center Township, Hancock County, Indiana.

== History ==
Maxwell was laid out and platted in 1881, and was named for a man who worked on building the railroad to the town. The Maxwell post office was established in 1882.

== Education ==
Greenfield-Central Community School Corporation operates area schools, including Maxwell Intermediate School. The local high school is Greenfield-Central High School.

== Demographics ==
The United States Census Bureau defined Maxwell as a census designated place in the 2022 American Community Survey.
