= Brandywine Township, Hancock County, Indiana =

Brandywine Township
- Township
- Location in Hancock County
- Coordinates: 39°43′34″N 85°46′30″W
- Country: United States
- State: Indiana
- County: Hancock

Government
  - Type: Indiana township

Area
  - Total: 24.24 sq mi (62.8 km^{2})
  - Land: 24.23 sq mi (62.8 km^{2})
  - Water: 0.01 sq mi (0.026 km^{2}) 0.04%
- Elevation: 860 ft (262 m)

Population (2020)
  - Total: 2,359
  - Density: 98.7/sq mi (38.1/km^{2})
- GNIS feature ID: 0453133

Brandywine Township is one of nine townships in Hancock County, Indiana, United States. As of the 2010 census, its population was 2,392 and it contained 892 housing units.

== History ==
Brandywine Township was organized in 1828. It was named from the Brandywine Creek.

== Geography ==
According to the 2010 census, the township has a total area of 24.24 square miles (62.8 km^{2}), of which 24.23 square miles (62.8 km^{2}) (or 99.96%) is land and 0.01 square miles (0.026 km^{2}) (or 0.04%) is water. The streams of Maxwell Ditch and Wilson Ditch run through this township.

=== Cities and towns ===
- Greenfield (south edge)

=== Unincorporated towns ===
- Carrollton
- Reedville Station

(This list is based on USGS data and may include former settlements.)

=== Adjacent townships ===
- Center Township (north)
- Blue River Township (east)
- Hanover Township, Shelby County (southeast)
- Van Buren Township, Shelby County (south)
- Sugar Creek Township (west)

=== Cemeteries ===
The township contains one cemetery, Little Sugar Creek.

=== Major highways ===
- U.S. Route 52
- Indiana State Road 9

=== Airports and landing strips ===
- Osgood Field
