= Sugar Creek Township, Hancock County, Indiana =

Sugar Creek Township
- Township
- Location in Hancock County
- Coordinates: 39°44′22″N 85°53′42″W
- Country: United States
- State: Indiana
- County: Hancock

Government
  - Type: Indiana township

Area
  - Total: 35.4 sq mi (92 km^{2})
  - Land: 35.3 sq mi (91 km^{2})
  - Water: 0.1 sq mi (0.26 km^{2}) 0.28%
- Elevation: 827 ft (252 m)

Population (2020)
  - Total: 16,495
  - Density: 422.7/sq mi (163.2/km^{2})
- GNIS feature ID: 0453882

Sugar Creek Township is one of nine townships in Hancock County, Indiana, United States. As of the 2010 census, its population was 14,920 and it contained 5,876 housing units.

== History ==
Sugar Creek Township was organized in 1828, and named from its principal stream.

Rufus and Amanda Black House was listed on the National Register of Historic Places in 2014.

== Geography ==
According to the 2010 census, the township has a total area of 35.4 square miles (92 km^{2}), of which 35.3 square miles (91 km^{2}) (or 99.72%) is land and 0.1 square miles (0.26 km^{2}) (or 0.28%) is water. Lakes in this township include Spring Lake. The streams of Palestine Branch and Sugar Run run through this township.

=== Cities and towns ===
- Cumberland (southeast quarter)
- Spring Lake
- New Palestine

=== Unincorporated towns ===
- Carriage Estates
- Gem
- Philadelphia
- Schildmeier Park

(This list is based on USGS data and may include former settlements.)

=== Adjacent townships ===
- Buck Creek Township (north)
- Center Township (northeast)
- Brandywine Township (east)
- Van Buren Township, Shelby County (southeast)
- Moral Township, Shelby County (south)
- Franklin Township, Marion County (southwest)
- Warren Township, Marion County (west)

=== Cemeteries ===
The township contains nine cemeteries: Dye, Langenberger, McNamee, New Palestine, Owen, Pitcher, Richmond, Schramm, and Zion Lutheran.

=== Major highways ===
- U.S. Route 40
- U.S. Route 52
