= Nashville, Hancock County, Indiana =

- Unincorporated community
- Location within Indiana Location within the United States
- Coordinates: 39°55′42″N 85°39′34″W
- Country: United States
- State: Indiana
- County: Hancock
- Township: Brown
- Elevation: 938 ft (286 m)
- ZIP code: 46186
- FIPS code: 18-52045
- GNIS feature ID: 439942

Nashville is a former unincorporated community in Brown Township, Hancock County, Indiana. It was located two miles northwest of Warrington, Indiana along N. Nashville Road.

== History ==
Nashville was laid out and platted in 1834 with 32 lots. Some stores and blacksmith shops were erected. However, a 1916 book on the county's history reports that the stores "disappeared long ago", though the blacksmith shops lasted longer, and all that was left of the community by then was a few houses.
