= Brown Township, Hancock County, Indiana =

Brown Township
- Township
- Location in Hancock County
- Coordinates: 39°54′23″N 85°38′02″W
- Country: United States
- State: Indiana
- County: Hancock

Government
  - Type: Indiana township

Area
  - Total: 30.82 sq mi (79.8 km^{2})
  - Land: 30.76 sq mi (79.7 km^{2})
  - Water: 0.06 sq mi (0.16 km^{2}) 0.19%
- Elevation: 971 ft (296 m)

Population (2020)
  - Total: 2,516
  - Density: 83.6/sq mi (32.3/km^{2})
- GNIS feature ID: 0453137

Brown Township is one of nine townships in Hancock County, Indiana, United States. As of the 2010 census, its population was 2,571 and it contained 1,067 housing units.

== History ==
Brown Township was organized in 1833. It was named for Prior Brown, a pioneer settler.

== Geography ==
According to the 2010 census, the township has a total area of 30.82 square miles (79.8 km^{2}), of which 30.76 square miles (79.7 km^{2}) (or 99.81%) is land and 0.06 square miles (0.16 km^{2}) (or 0.19%) is water. The streams of Harlan Run, Maize Run, McCray Run, Shirley Drain and Village Brook run through this township.

=== Cities and towns ===
- Shirley (west three-quarters)
- Wilkinson

=== Unincorporated towns ===
- Nashville
- Warrington
- Willow Branch

(This list is based on USGS data and may include former settlements.)

=== Adjacent townships ===
- Adams Township, Madison County (north)
- Greensboro Township, Henry County (east)
- Harrison Township, Henry County (east)
- Wayne Township, Henry County (southeast)
- Jackson Township (south)
- Green Township (west)
- Fall Creek Township, Madison County (northwest)

=== Cemeteries ===
The township contains five cemeteries: McCray, Harlan, Hayes (twp), Gard (twp) and Reeves (twp).

=== Major highways ===
- Indiana State Road 109
- Indiana State Road 234
