= Gem City =

Gem City may refer to:

- Gem, Indiana
- Gem, Kansas

It may also refer to any of the following cities which are known by the nickname Gem City:

- Monrovia, California, the "Gem City of the Foothills"
- Quincy, Illinois
- Diamond, Missouri, the "Gem City of the Ozarks"
- Dayton, Ohio
- Toronto, Ohio
- Erie, Pennsylvania
- Lynden, Washington
- Laramie, Wyoming, the "Gem City of the Plains"
- Palatka, Florida, the "Gem City of the St. Johns River"

== See also ==
- Gemcity
