= Cleveland, Indiana =

- Unincorporated community
- Location within Indiana Location within the United States
- Coordinates: 39°47′25″N 85°38′41″W
- Country: United States
- State: Indiana
- County: Hancock
- Township: Jackson
- Elevation: 974 ft (297 m)
- ZIP code: 46140
- FIPS code: 18-13546
- GNIS feature ID: 432645

Cleveland is an unincorporated community in Jackson Township, Hancock County, Indiana.

== History ==
Cleveland was initially called Portland and, under the latter name, was laid out and platted in 1834. The community was renamed Cleveland in 1855.

A post office was established in Cleveland in 1852 and remained in operation until it was discontinued in 1903.
