= Rufus and Amanda Black House =

Historic house in Indiana, United States

- U.S. National Register of Historic Places
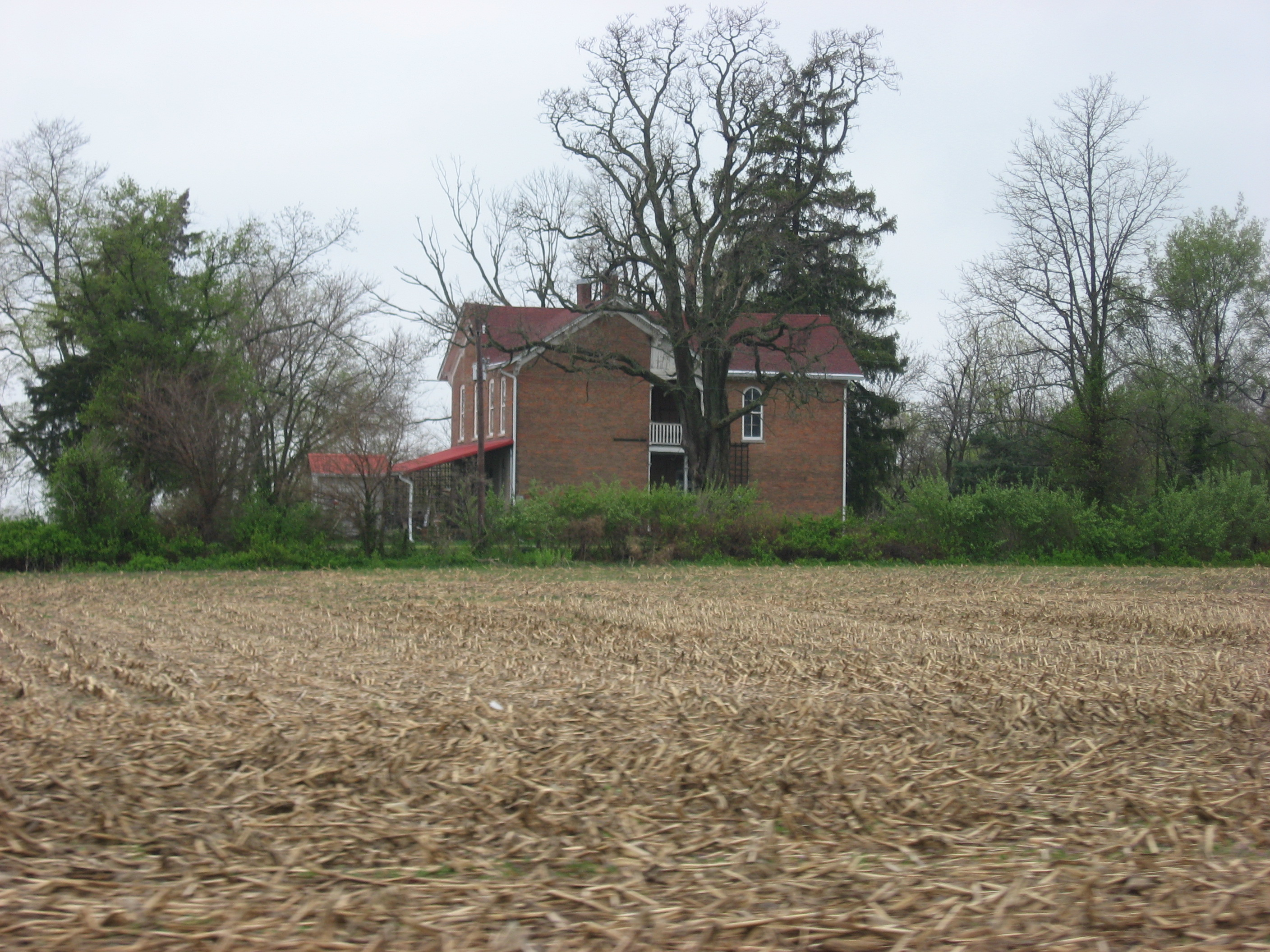
- Rufus and Amanda Black House, April 2014

- Location within Indiana Location within the United States
- Location: 222 S200W at Philadelphia, Sugar Creek Township, Hancock County, Indiana
- Coordinates: 39°46′45″N 85°50′29″W
- Area: Less than 1 acre (0.40 ha)
- Built: c. 1870
- Architectural style: Italianate
- NRHP reference No.: 14000802
- Added to NRHP: September 30, 2014

Rufus and Amanda Black House is a historic home located in Sugar Creek Township, Hancock County, Indiana. It was built about 1870, and is a two-story, L-shaped, Italianate style brick dwelling. It features an original two-story porch.

It was listed on the National Register of Historic Places in 2014.
