= Carrollton, Hancock County, Indiana =

Carrollton
- Unincorporated community and Census-designated place
- Location within Indiana Location within the United States
- Coordinates: 39°42′18″N 85°49′08″W
- Country: United States
- State: Indiana
- County: Hancock
- Township: Brandywine
- Elevation: 833 ft (254 m)
- Time zone: UTC-5 (Eastern)
  - Summer (DST): UTC-4 (Eastern)
- ZIP code: 46130
- FIPS code: 18-10558
- GNIS feature ID: 2830527

Carrollton is an unincorporated community in Brandywine Township, Hancock County, Indiana.

== History ==
Carrollton was platted in 1854.

== Demographics ==
The United States Census Bureau delineated Carrollton as a census designated place in the 2022 American Community Survey.

== See also ==
- Finly, Indiana
