= Nameless Creek =

Stream in Hancock County, Indiana, U.S.

Coordinates: 39°42′53″N 85°40′40″W

Nameless Creek is a stream in Hancock County, Indiana, in the United States.

Nameless Creek was named in about 1830 when an early settler inquired about the name of a creek he had crossed, and upon learning it had no name, said, "It is a nameless creek", and the name stuck ever since.

== See also ==
- List of rivers of Indiana
