= Riley, Hancock County, Indiana =

- Unincorporated community
- Location within Indiana Location within the United States
- Coordinates: 39°47′13″N 85°43′50″W
- Country: United States
- State: Indiana
- County: Hancock
- Township: Center
- Elevation: 899 ft (274 m)
- ZIP code: 46140
- FIPS code: 18-64494
- GNIS feature ID: 442016

Riley is an unincorporated community in Center Township, Hancock County, Indiana.
