= Lockheed PV-2 Harpoon No. 37396 =

Hot Stuff
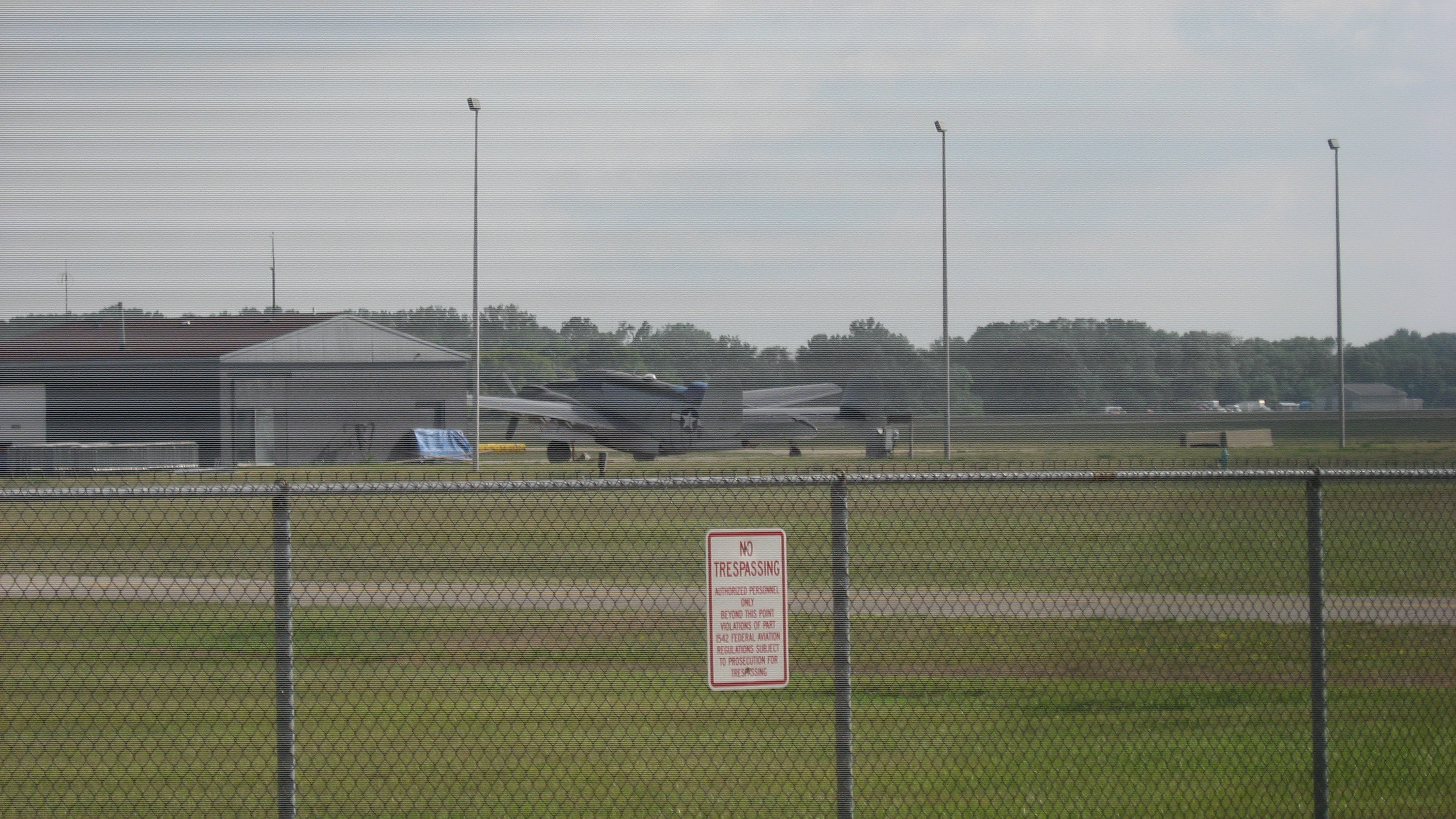
- Distant view of the aircraft at the Indianapolis Regional Airport

General information
- Type: PV-2 Harpoon
- Manufacturer: Lockheed
- Registration: N7265C

History
- Manufactured: 1945

- Lockheed PV-2 Harpoon No. 37396
- U.S. National Register of Historic Places
- Location: Mount Comfort, Indiana
- Area: less than 1 acre
- Architect: Lockheed Aircraft Corporation
- NRHP reference No.: 09000234
- Added to NRHP: April 23, 2009

Lockheed PV-2 Harpoon, U.S. Navy Bureau Number 37396 , civil registration N7265C, named "Hot Stuff", is located at 3867 N. Aviation Way, Mount Comfort, Indiana. The aircraft, an intact example of a World War II anti-submarine patrol bomber, was added to the National Register of Historic Places on April 23, 2009. It was built in 1945 by the Lockheed Aircraft Corporation, and is one of only 104 built of this PV-2 variant of the Lockheed Ventura. At the time of its listing, it was the only complete, operable example of a PV-2 in the United States, although one was being restored in Wisconsin. While this particular plane did not see combat, the type was used in the Aleutian Islands during World War II. The property was the featured listing in the National Park Service's weekly list of May 1, 2009. The airplane was later renamed to "Island Doll" before being donated to the Military Aviation Museum.

== See also ==
- Lockheed Ventura
