= Spring Lake, Indiana =

- Town
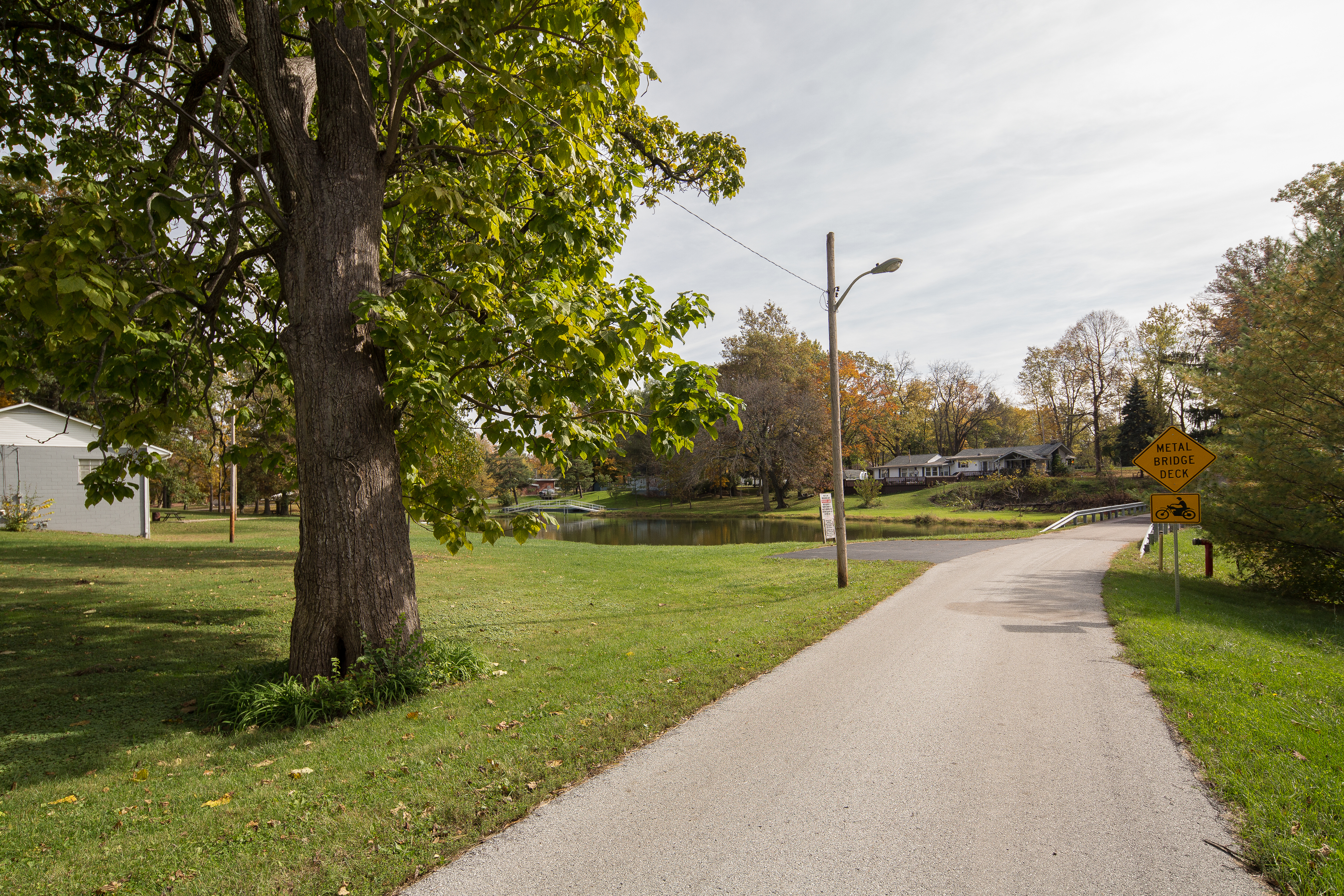

- Location of Spring Lake in Hancock County, Indiana.
- Coordinates: 39°46′36″N 85°51′13″W
- Country: United States
- State: Indiana
- County: Hancock
- Township: Sugar Creek

Area
  - Total: 0.16 sq mi (0.42 km^{2})
  - Land: 0.15 sq mi (0.40 km^{2})
  - Water: 0.012 sq mi (0.03 km^{2})
- Elevation: 846 ft (258 m)

Population (2020)
  - Total: 210
  - Density: 1,375.6/sq mi (531.14/km^{2})
- Time zone: UTC-5 (Eastern (EST))
  - Summer (DST): UTC-4 (EDT)
- ZIP code: 46140
- Area codes: 317 and 463
- FIPS code: 18-72296
- GNIS feature ID: 2397675
- Website: www.springlakein.org

Spring Lake is a town in Sugar Creek Township, Hancock County, Indiana, United States, along Sugar Creek. As of the 2020 census, Spring Lake had a population of 210.

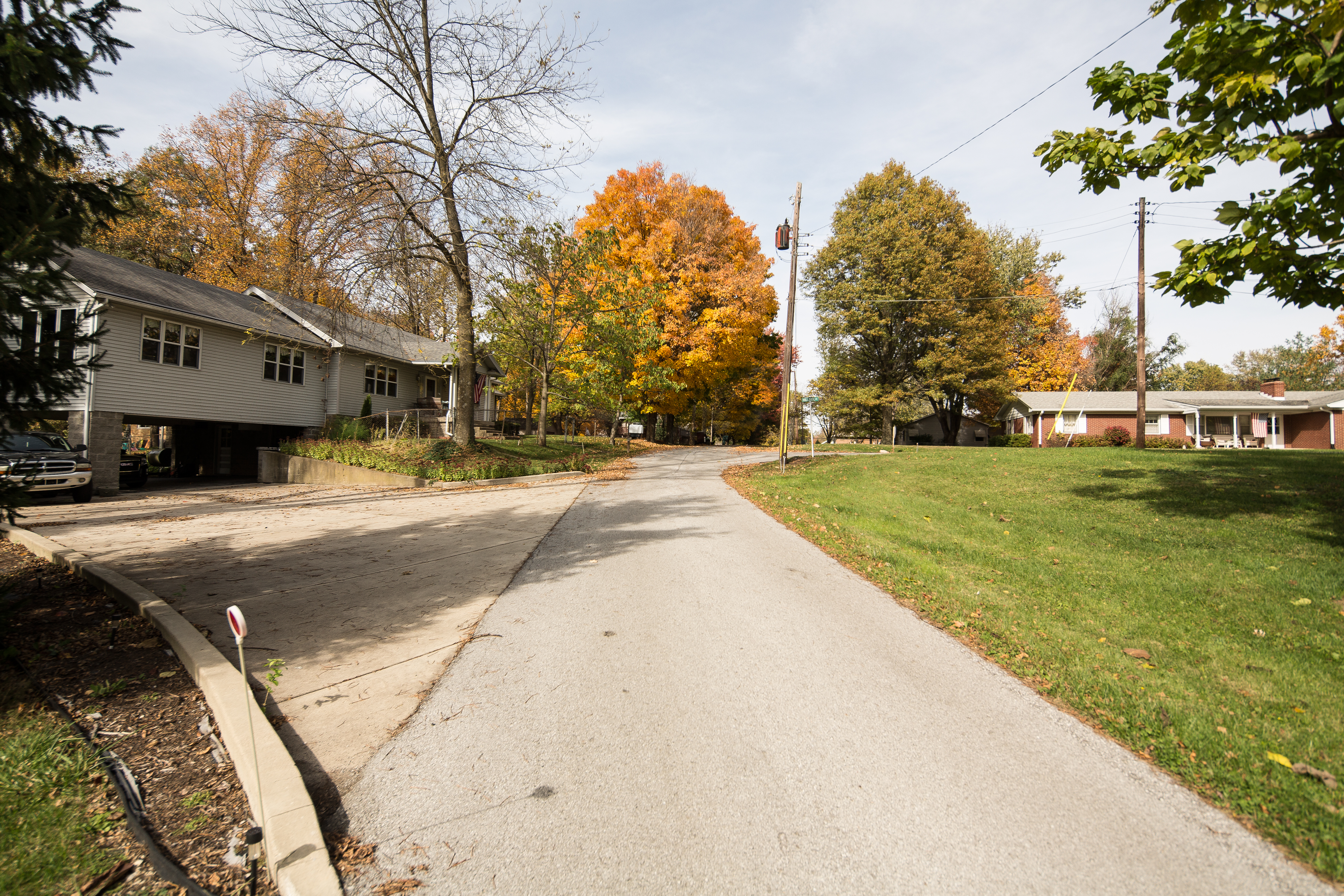
Spring Lake, Indiana

== History ==
Spring Lake is centered on an artificial lake of the same name, which was completed in about 1885. Spring Lake was laid out as a town in 1912.

== Geography ==
According to the 2010 census, Spring Lake has a total area of 0.161 square miles (0.42 km^{2}), of which 0.15 square miles (0.39 km^{2}) (or 93.17%) is land and 0.011 square miles (0.03 km^{2}) (or 6.83%) is water.

== Demographics ==
Historical population
Census	Pop.	Note	%±
1930	69		—
1940	111		60.9%
1950	156		40.5%
1960	206		32.1%
1970	263		27.7%
1980	236		−10.3%
1990	216		−8.5%
2000	262		21.3%
2010	218		−16.8%
2020	210		−3.7%
U.S. Decennial Census

=== 2010 census ===
As of the census of 2010, there were 218 people, 95 households, and 67 families living in the town. The population density was 1,453.3 inhabitants per square mile (561.1/km^{2}). There were 98 housing units at an average density of 653.3 per square mile (252.2/km^{2}). The racial makeup of the town was 95.9% White, 0.5% African American, 0.5% Native American, 0.5% from other races, and 2.8% from two or more races. Hispanic or Latino of any race were 0.9% of the population.

There were 95 households, of which 24.2% had children under the age of 18 living with them, 56.8% were married couples living together, 7.4% had a female householder with no husband present, 6.3% had a male householder with no wife present, and 29.5% were non-families. 25.3% of all households were made up of individuals, and 9.5% had someone living alone who was 65 years of age or older. The average household size was 2.29 and the average family size was 2.73.

The median age in the town was 47 years. 16.5% of residents were under the age of 18; 7.5% were between the ages of 18 and 24; 22% were from 25 to 44; 33.4% were from 45 to 64; and 20.6% were 65 years of age or older. The gender makeup of the town was 52.8% male and 47.2% female.

=== 2000 census ===
As of the census of 2000, there were 262 people, 107 households, and 87 families living in the town. The population density was 1,697.2 inhabitants per square mile (655.3/km^{2}). There were 108 housing units at an average density of 699.6 per square mile (270.1/km^{2}). The racial makeup of the town was 99.62% White, and 0.38% from two or more races. Hispanic or Latino of any race were 1.15% of the population.

There were 107 households, out of which 23.4% had children under the age of 18 living with them, 70.1% were married couples living together, 6.5% had a female householder with no husband present, and 17.8% were non-families. 17.8% of all households were made up of individuals, and 6.5% had someone living alone who was 65 years of age or older. The average household size was 2.45 and the average family size was 2.72.

In the town, the population was spread out, with 19.5% under the age of 18, 7.3% from 18 to 24, 25.2% from 25 to 44, 32.1% from 45 to 64, and 16.0% who were 65 years of age or older. The median age was 44 years. For every 100 females, there were 109.6 males. For every 100 females age 18 and over, there were 113.1 males.

The median income for a household in the town was $52,222, and the median income for a family was $56,250. Males had a median income of $40,750 versus $26,458 for females. The per capita income for the town was $24,468. About 3.3% of families and 2.7% of the population were below the poverty line, including 8.8% of those under the age of eighteen and none of those 65 or over.
