= Vernon Township, Hancock County, Indiana =

Vernon Township
- Township
- Location in Hancock County
- Coordinates: 39°54′25″N 85°52′17″W
- Country: United States
- State: Indiana
- County: Hancock

Government
  - Type: Indiana township

Area
  - Total: 31.33 sq mi (81.1 km^{2})
  - Land: 31.26 sq mi (81.0 km^{2})
  - Water: 0.07 sq mi (0.18 km^{2}) 0.22%
- Elevation: 863 ft (263 m)

Population (2020)
  - Total: 15,615
  - Density: 352.1/sq mi (135.9/km^{2})
- GNIS feature ID: 0453955
- Website: www.vernontownship.us

Vernon Township is one of nine townships in Hancock County, Indiana, United States. As of the 2020 census, its population was 15,615 and it contained 4,322 housing units.

== History ==
Vernon Township was organized in 1836. It was named after Mount Vernon, the plantation home of President George Washington. Vernon Township which includes McCordsville, Fortville and the unincorporated portion of Vernon Township are reported to have a population of 15,615 according to the 2020 census.

Frank Littleton Round Barn was listed on the National Register of Historic Places in 1993. This round barn was built in 1903. The Littleton Barn is a three-story round barn with an expansive hayloft and cupola. The barn is 102 feet in diameter making it the largest round barn in Indiana. The design is simple with vertically symmetrical windows on the first and second floor with a series of square windows along the roofline. The large domed roof leads to the large cupola that also features a number of windows. The Littleton Barn has become a regular feature on Indiana barn tours and remains one of the most well-known barns in the state.

[[Vernon Township Fire Department (VTFD) was founded in May 2019 with the opening of the new Vernon Township Fire Station 431 located at 600 Vitality Drive in Fortville. The McCordsville and Fortville Volunteer Fire Departments merged with the new Vernon Township Fire Department. The new EMS Department was started in January 2020. Previously EMS was outsourced to Seals/Priority Ambulance Service. The new Fire Department and Ambulance Service (EMS) became part of the Vernon Township Fire Protection Territory in June 2020. The Territory is made up of Vernon Township (Provider Unit), the Town of McCordsville (Participating Unit) and the Town of Fortville (Participating Unit). In December 2021 VTFD firefighters began 24/7 on station service operating from the McCordsville Volunteer Station on Form Street. A new full-service fire station was built near the corner of 600 and 900 in McCordsville and opened in August 2023. ]]

== Geography ==
According to the 2020 census, the township has a total area of 31.33 square miles (81.1 km^{2}), of which 31.26 square miles (81.0 km^{2}) (or 99.78%) is land and 0.07 square miles (0.18 km^{2}) (or 0.22%) is water.

=== Towns ===
- Fortville
- McCordsville

=== Parks ===
- Old School Park located in McCordsville was donated by Vernon Township to the Town of McCordsville in 2021.
- Hampton Fields located in Fortville was donated by Vernon Township to the Town of Fortville in 2021.

=== Unincorporated towns ===
- Denny Corner Denney's Corner is south of State Road 234 at Fortville Pike and 700 North. It was the home of the Dunkard (German Baptist) Church, Denney's School and the A.H. Denney Farms. The church is now gone, but the other buildings remain. The school was converted into a residence in 1946. When the Dunkard Church property was sold, the Denny's were re-interred at Gravel Lawn. The Denney barn is now called Barn Sign Works.
- Eastgate
- Woodbury

(This list is based on USGS data and may include former settlements.)

=== Adjacent townships ===
- Green Township, Madison County (northeast)
- Green Township (east)
- Center Township (southeast)
- Buck Creek Township (south)
- Lawrence Township, Marion County (west)
- Fall Creek Township, Hamilton County (northwest)

=== Cemeteries ===
Vernon Township contains four historic cemeteries: 1. Gillium-Chappel Historic Cemetery on Railroad Street in McCordsville. The original Chapel was built circa 1854 and the cemetery was restored in 2022 2. McCordsville Historic Cemetery (aka IOOF Cemetery) on 600 South in McCordsville was built circa 1871 and restored in 2019 3. Cauldwell Historic Cemetery (aka Cauldwell-Brokaw) on W. State Rd 234 was built circa 1846 and restored in 2021 after a car accident did substantial damage to the small cemetery 4. Caudell-Simmons Historic Cemetery on CR 1050 N. in Fortville was built circa 1839 and is scheduled to be restored in the summer of 2022.

=== Major highways ===
- U.S. Route 36
- Indiana State Road 13
- Indiana State Road 67
- Indiana State Road 234
- Indiana State Road 238 Now called Southeastern Parkway

== Education ==
Vernon Township residents may obtain a free library card from the Vernon Township Public Library in Fortville.

Vernon Township residents have an excellent public school system (A rating) with Mt. Vernon Community School Corporation which includes three Elementary Schools, a Middle School, and a High School. Headstart and pre-school are both offered. https://www.mvcsc.k12.in.us/

The Geist Montessori School, a tuition-free, a public charter school is located in McCordsville and offers Pre-K thru 8th-grade education. http://www.gmacademy.org/
