= Philadelphia, Indiana =

- Unincorporated community and Census-designated Place
- Location within Indiana Location within the United States
- Coordinates: 39°46′56″N 85°50′50″W
- Country: United States
- State: Indiana
- County: Hancock
- Township: Sugar Creek
- Elevation: 837 ft (255 m)
- ZIP code: 46140
- FIPS code: 18-59490
- GNIS feature ID: 2830401

Philadelphia is an unincorporated community in Sugar Creek Township, Hancock County, Indiana.

== History ==
Philadelphia was laid out and platted in 1838. It took its name from Philadelphia, Pennsylvania, the "city of brotherly love". A post office was established at Philadelphia in 1838, and remained in operation until it was discontinued in 1907.

== Demographics ==
The United States Census Bureau designated Philadelphia as a census designated place in the 2022 American Community Survey.
