= County Line Bridge (Morristown, Indiana) =

- U.S. National Register of Historic Places
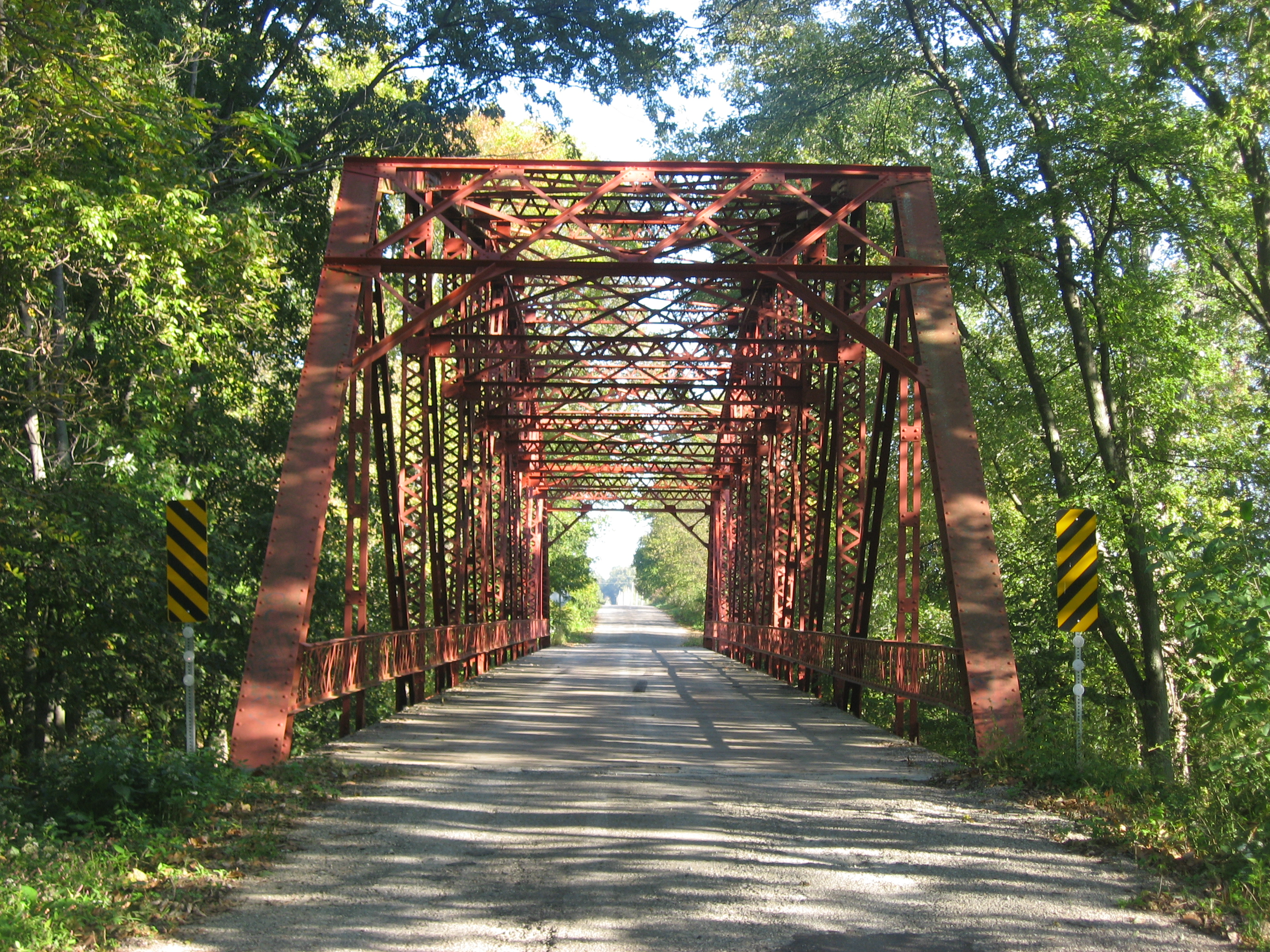
- County Line Bridge, October 2011

- Location within Indiana Location within the United States
- Location: County Road 900E over the Big Blue River, northeast of Morristown in Blue River Township, Hancock County, Indiana and Ripley Township, Rush County, Indiana
- Coordinates: 39°42′35″N 85°37′59″W
- Area: less than one acre
- Built: 1916
- Built by: Cameron, Adolphus; Burk Construction Co.
- Architectural style: Parker through-truss
- NRHP reference No.: 94001356
- Added to NRHP: November 25, 1994

County Line Bridge, also known as Hancock County Bridge #105, is a historic Parker through-truss bridge located in Blue River Township, Hancock County, Indiana and Ripley Township, Rush County, Indiana. It was built in 1916 and spans the Big Blue River. It measures 200 feet long and has a clearance of 15 feet, 5 inches.

It was listed on the National Register of Historic Places in 1994.
