= Woodbury, Indiana =

- Unincorporated community
- Location within Indiana Location within the United States
- Coordinates: 39°54′31″N 85°53′42″W
- Country: United States
- State: Indiana
- County: Hancock
- Township: Vernon
- Elevation: 860 ft (260 m)
- ZIP code: 46055
- FIPS code: 18-85202
- GNIS feature ID: 446281

Woodbury is an unincorporated community in Vernon Township, Hancock County, Indiana.

== History ==
Woodbury was laid out and platted in 1851 by Ellen Wood. A post office was established at Woodbury in 1858, and remained in operation until it was discontinued in 1903.
