= Westland, Indiana =

- Unincorporated community
- Location within Indiana Location within the United States
- Coordinates: 39°45′01″N 85°41′16″W
- Country: United States
- State: Indiana
- County: Hancock
- Township: Blue River
- Elevation: 892 ft (272 m)
- Time zone: UTC-5 (Eastern (EST))
  - Summer (DST): UTC-4 (EDT)
- ZIP code: 46140
- GNIS feature ID: 447628

Westland is an unincorporated community in Blue River Township, Hancock County, in the U.S. state of Indiana.

== History ==
Westland was never properly laid out or platted as a town.

The community received its name from the Westland Friends Church, which was established in the area in 1840. Quakers, who attended the Walnut Ridge Friends Meeting near Carthage in Rush County, moved into southeastern Hancock County in the 1830s. It was too far to travel to church on a regular basis so a new Meeting was established in the land west of Walnut Ridge. This would be Westland Friends church, which is still in existence today.

A post office was established at Westland in 1845, and remained in operation until it was discontinued in 1905. Henry West served as an early postmaster.
