= Finly, Indiana =

- Unincorporated community
- Location within Indiana Location within the United States
- Coordinates: 39°42′22″N 85°49′09″W
- Country: United States
- State: Indiana
- County: Hancock
- Township: Brandywine
- Elevation: 833 ft (254 m)
- Time zone: UTC-5 (Eastern)
  - Summer (DST): UTC-4 (Eastern)
- ZIP code: 46130 (Fountaintown PO) (previously 46129)
- FIPS code: 18-63640
- GNIS feature ID: 441861

Finly, also known as Reedville Station, Carrollton, Kinder, & Tailholt, is an unincorporated community in Brandywine Township, Hancock County, Indiana.

== History ==
A post office named Kinder was established on the present site of Carrollton (Finly), on or near there, on April 28, 1847. Its name was changed to Carrollton on January 26, 1869. The post office was maintained until September 30, 1905, when it was taken away and mail was delivered by a rural carrier from Fountaintown, two miles (3 km) southeast. Carrollton was then without a post office until October 13, 1912, when it was reestablished under the name of Finly, in honor of Congressman Finly Gray. A rural route from this post office was started on March 1, 1915. Before the completion of the railroad in 1869, the mail was delivered by a star carrier, who made two trips per week between Indianapolis and Rushville, as set forth under the history of mails at New Palestine.

The original plat of the town of Carrollton was surveyed by Hiram Comstock, on February 28, 1854, and contained thirty-two lots. The Reverend M.S. Ragsdale platted the only addition to the town on August 23, 1870.

The little town has borne more names than any other town in the county. Originally it was known as Kinder. After the name of the post office was changed to Carrollton in 1869, the town was given that name. The railroad and express companies adopted the name of Reedville for their stations. When the post office was reestablished in 1913, the name Finly was added to the list. The residents usually referred to their town as "Tailholt," upon which Indiana author James Whitcomb Riley (1849−1916) seized and, with poetic genius, immortalized the town.

== See also ==
- Finly Hutchinson Gray
- Carrollton, Hancock County, Indiana
