= Shirley, Indiana =

- Town
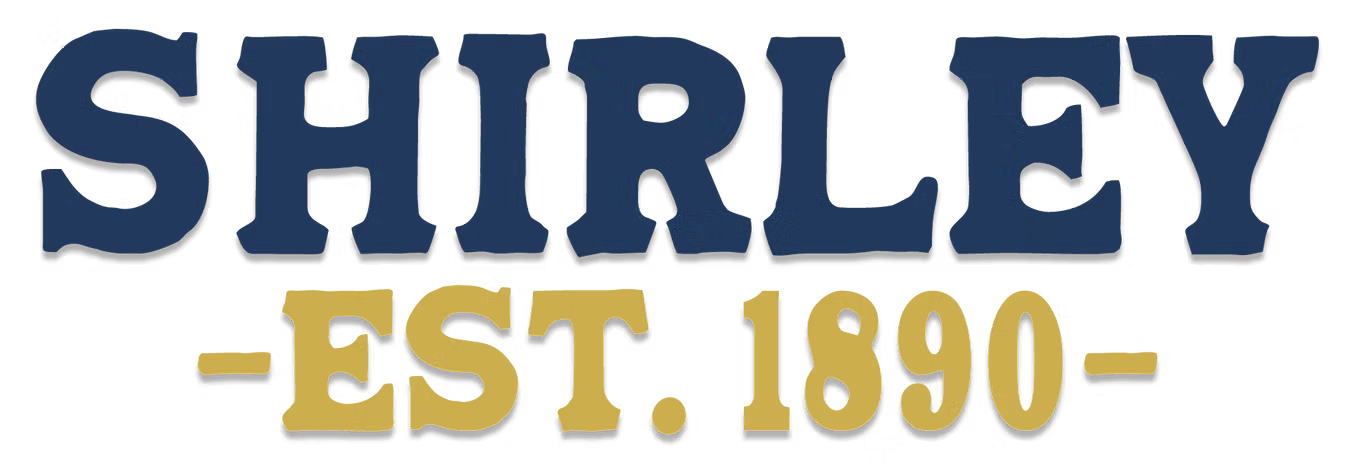
- Logo

- Location of Shirley in Hancock County and Henry County, Indiana.
- Coordinates: 39°53′27″N 85°34′48″W
- Country: United States
- State: Indiana
- Counties: Hancock, Henry
- Township: Brown, Greensboro

Area
  - Total: 0.36 sq mi (0.94 km^{2})
  - Land: 0.36 sq mi (0.94 km^{2})
  - Water: 0 sq mi (0.00 km^{2})
- Elevation: 1,024 ft (312 m)

Population (2020)
  - Total: 819
  - Estimate (2025): 844 ▲
  - Density: 2,267/sq mi (875.3/km^{2})
- Time zone: UTC-5 (Eastern (EST))
  - Summer (DST): UTC-4 (EDT)
- ZIP code: 47384
- Area code: 765
- FIPS code: 18-69516
- GNIS feature ID: 2397659
- Website: www.townofshirley.com

Shirley is a town in Brown Township, Hancock County and Greensboro Township, Henry County, Indiana, United States. The population was 819 at the 2020 census.

== History ==
Shirley had its start in the year 1890 when the Cincinnati, Wabash and Michigan Railway was extended to that point. It was named for Joseph A. Shirley, a railroad official.

Jane Ross Reeves Octagon House was listed on the National Register of Historic Places in 2001.

== Geography ==
While most of Shirley is in Hancock County, Main Street is the county line and the smaller portion of Shirley is in Henry County.

According to the 2010 census, Shirley has a total area of 0.34 square miles (0.88 km^{2}), all land.

== Demographics ==
Historical population
Census	Pop.	Note	%±
1900	381		—
1910	1,519		298.7%
1920	1,079		−29.0%
1930	761		−29.5%
1940	952		25.1%
1950	1,087		14.2%
1960	1,038		−4.5%
1970	958		−7.7%
1980	919		−4.1%
1990	817		−11.1%
2000	806		−1.3%
2010	830		3.0%
2020	819		−1.3%
2025 (est.)	844		3.1%
U.S. Decennial Census

=== 2010 census ===
As of the census of 2010, there were 830 people, 328 households, and 225 families living in the town. The population density was 2,441.2 inhabitants per square mile (942.6/km^{2}). There were 365 housing units at an average density of 1,073.5 per square mile (414.5/km^{2}). The racial makeup of the town was 97.7% White, 0.6% African American, 0.6% Native American, 0.4% Asian, 0.2% from other races, and 0.5% from two or more races. Hispanic or Latino of any race were 0.4% of the population.

There were 328 households, of which 40.5% had children under the age of 18 living with them, 46.3% were married couples living together, 14.0% had a female householder with no husband present, 8.2% had a male householder with no wife present, and 31.4% were non-families. 27.7% of all households were made up of individuals, and 13.7% had someone living alone who was 65 years of age or older. The average household size was 2.53 and the average family size was 3.04.

The median age in the town was 35 years. 28.9% of residents were under the age of 18; 6.6% were between the ages of 18 and 24; 25.6% were from 25 to 44; 25.3% were from 45 to 64; and 13.6% were 65 years of age or older. The gender makeup of the town was 49.3% male and 50.7% female.

=== 2000 census ===
As of the census of 2000, there were 806 people, 320 households, and 224 families living in the town. The population density was 2,178.1 inhabitants per square mile (841.0/km^{2}). There were 339 housing units at an average density of 916.1 per square mile (353.7/km^{2}). The racial makeup of the town was 98.76% White, 0.12% Native American, 0.25% Asian, 0.25% from other races, and 0.62% from two or more races. Hispanic or Latino of any race were 0.37% of the population.

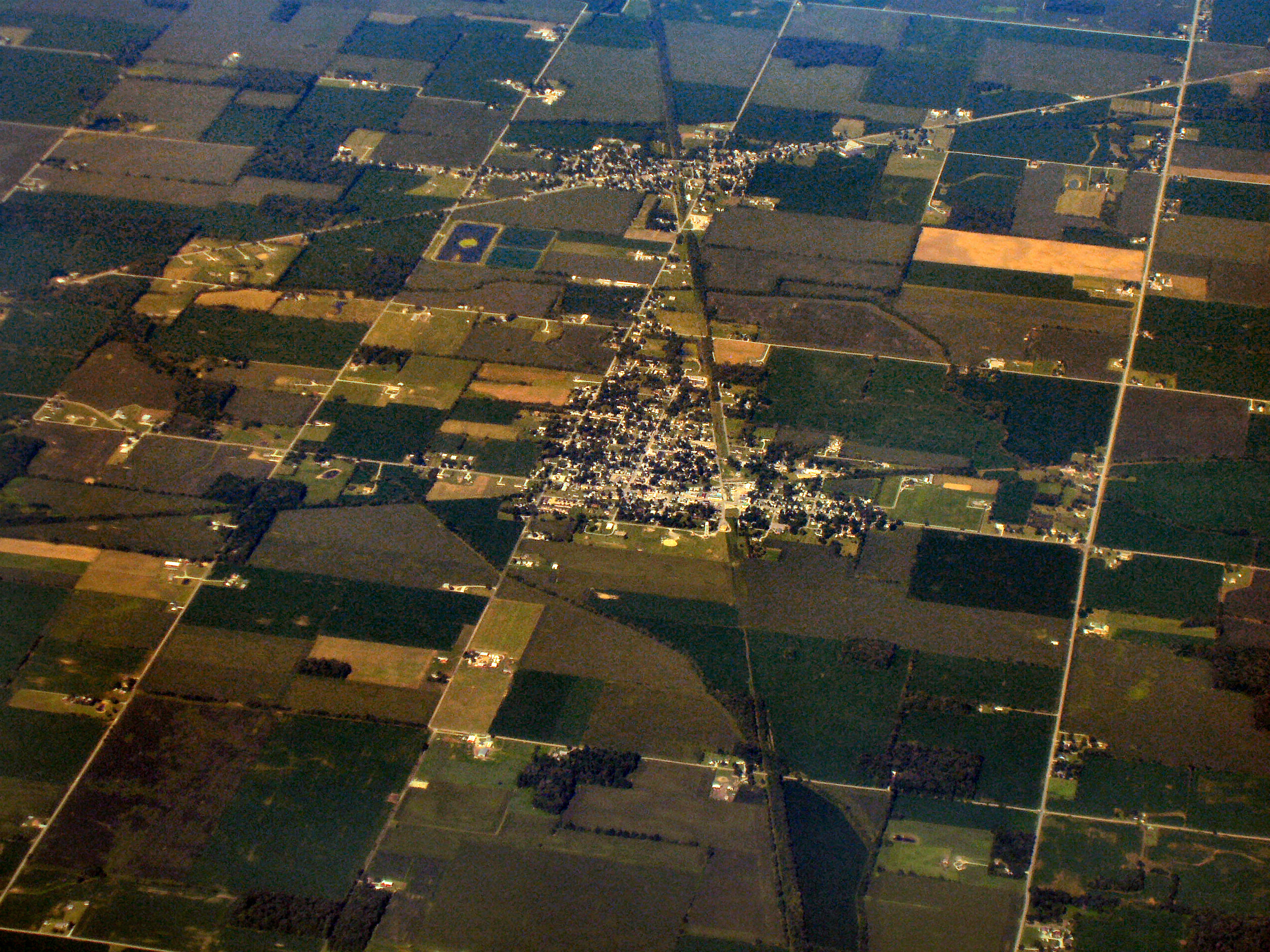
Shirley from the air, looking west. Wilkinson is in the distance.

There were 320 households, out of which 30.9% had children under the age of 18 living with them, 58.1% were married couples living together, 9.4% had a female householder with no husband present, and 30.0% were non-families. 26.3% of all households were made up of individuals, and 13.8% had someone living alone who was 65 years of age or older. The average household size was 2.52 and the average family size was 3.04.

In the town, the population was spread out, with 25.3% under the age of 18, 10.8% from 18 to 24, 28.0% from 25 to 44, 19.9% from 45 to 64, and 16.0% who were 65 years of age or older. The median age was 36 years. For every 100 females, there were 93.8 males. For every 100 females age 18 and over, there were 86.4 males.

The median income for a household in the town was $37,000, and the median income for a family was $39,583. Males had a median income of $35,455 versus $22,692 for females. The per capita income for the town was $16,603. About 6.4% of families and 6.3% of the population were below the poverty line, including 6.9% of those under age 18 and 11.7% of those age 65 or over.
