= Indianapolis–Richmond Line =

Overview
- Locale: Indiana
- Termini: Indianapolis Traction Terminal; Richmond

Service
- System: Terre Haute, Indianapolis and Eastern Traction Company (1907–1931); Indiana Railroad (1931–1937)

History
- Opened: June 13, 1900
- Closed: May 9, 1937

Technical
- Character: Interurban
- Track gauge: 1,435 mm (4 ft 8 1/2 in) standard gauge

The Indianapolis–Richmond Line was an interurban railway line in Indiana. Built piecemeal between 1900 and 1903, the line ran east from Indianapolis to Richmond where connections with the Dayton and Western Traction Company provided access to markets in Ohio. It became a key component of the consolidated Indiana Railroad, providing service until 1937.

== History ==
In November 1898, two Greenfield men, William C. Dudding and F. G. Banker, secured franchises and right-of-way for a line from Anderson to Greenfield and thence to Indianapolis, at the same time that Elmer J. Binford from the same city was seeking franchises for a line from Indianapolis to Richmond. Two months later Charles M. Cooper and Nathaniel Morris of Indianapolis, both representing independent interests, applied for a free right-of-way along the National Road. Three of the groups of capitalists pooled interests and chartered the Indianapolis-Greenfield Rapid Transit Company. Work began by October 1899 on the 16-mile (26 km) line. Construction was carried on so rapidly that a trial car carrying officials of the line and press representatives made the trip from Irvington to Greenfield June 13, 1900. At Irvington, passengers transferred to local cars to continue to Indianapolis.

Several stockholders of the company organized the Central Traction company, afterwards called the Indianapolis & Eastern Traction company. They began surveying a route from Greenfield to Knightstown, which was to be one link in their Indianapolis to Richmond scheme. The Greenfield to Charlottesville section was placed in operation in May 1902. Before the remaining part of the Knightstown extension had been completed, construction gangs were placed on the National Road between Knightstown and Dublin at which point the Indianapolis & Eastern Railway planned to connect with the line of the Richmond Street & Interurban Railway company then being built from Richmond to Dublin.

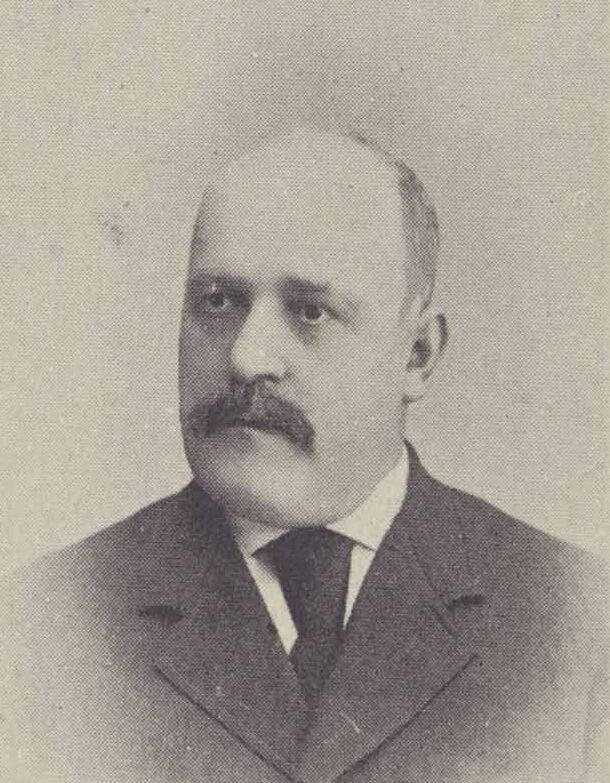
Portrait of John H. Roling

While the line from Greenfield to Indianapolis was constructed first, Richmond and the small towns to the west were the first to be visited by the surveyors and stock agents. As early as August 1895, a plan to connect their city with Connersville and Liberty received the support of the citizens of Richmond. Three years later N. J. Clodfelter, the pioneer promoter of interurbans in the Gas Belt, promised to construct a line from Richmond to Connersville. The next year more plans were made, the most promising being that of Benjamin Starr, John Barnes, B. F. Wissler, W. K. Bradbury, and John H. Roling, who chartered the Richmond Interurban Railway company for the purpose of building the much desired line east from Richmond through Centerville, East Germantown, Cambridge City to Dublin. The Union Trust Company of St. Louis owned a majority of the stock.

After failing twice to obtain franchises along the National Road, J. M. Lontz and Perry Freeman were successful in April 1900, and one year later the eastern capitalists whom they represented organized the Richmond Street & Interurban Railway company.

The company obtained a ready access to the streets of Richmond by purchasing the properties of the Richmond City Railway company which was sold under a decree of April 22, 1895. The Richmond to Centreville section, 6 miles (9.7 km) long, was begun first and was ready for operation by January 1902. The rest of the line to Dublin and the spur from Cambridge City to Milton was then pushed to meet the line of the Indianapolis & Eastern Railway company that was building its extension from Knightstown to Dublin. The Milton to Dublin line began carrying passengers in November. After installing the last piece of machinery at the Lewisville power station, a car made the trip from Indianapolis to Richmond on June 5, 1903. The interurban route through Richmond was simplified a few months after opening with construction of new tracks on Main Street. Regular service from the capital to Dublin, where connections were made with Richmond, was established the next September.

The through service and the establishment of through sleeping car service from Dayton, Ohio, to Indianapolis was delayed for a year because of the impossibility of running the large cars under the bridge of the Chicago, Cincinnati & Louisville Railroad tracks on Main Street in Richmond. After this barrier was removed, the limited service, which had been suspended for several months, was resumed and in January 1905, buffet and parlor car service was run in conjunction with the Dayton and Western between Indianapolis; Richmond; Newark, Ohio; and Columbus, Ohio. Through freight service was inaugurated in July 1905.

In the spring of 1906 the Indianapolis & Eastern changed the location of some of the rural stations. The residents along the line insisted these were fixed in the company's franchise, and, therefore, could not be changed. The land owners in Hancock county, whose farms adjoined the right-of-way, also complained that the traction company failed to maintain the road at the specified grade level, a condition which made it nearly impossible to cross the tracks. Upon petition of the property owners, the county commissioner revoked the franchise of the company and ordered the tracks removed from the National Road. In February 1908, a suit of the Indianapolis & Eastern railway secured the voiding of the county commissioner's order.

In the spring of 1907 the traction company became involved in a controversy with the city of Richmond that lasted for six years. The city wanted to exclude freight cars from the principal street, but the interurban company objected to the expense of constructing a separate freight line. Another grievance against the traction company was the failure to pave between its tracks as required in its franchise. In June 1907, the city council threatened to revoke the franchise of the Richmond Street Railway company, and the following month passed an ordinance forbidding the Dayton and Western to use the streets of the city. The Terre Haute, Indianapolis and Eastern Traction Company (THI&E), which had succeeded to the interests of the Indianapolis & Eastern and also was controlled by the same interests as the Dayton and Western, retaliated by operating the freight cars of the Dayton and Western inside the city limits. Later a building was leased outside the east corporate limits of the city for use as a freight house.

After a series of legal battles fought by the traction companies, the city council, and committees of the citizens who opposed the council's proposition to compel the interurban company to build a freight line through Glen Miller Park, the line was built through the park and a freight house in north Richmond was used by the THI&E and the Dayton and Western. The citizens continued to maintain that the railway tracks marred the beauty of the park; and in the spring of 1911, the city council, which had reversed its position, ordered the traction company to remove its track from the park. The city asserted that the council's permission to build tracks in Glen Miller had been illegal. After more litigation the company began removing its tracks from the park in June 1913.

By 1924, the line hosted seven limited trains daily between Indianapolis and Richmond. At Richmond, connections could be made with Dayton, Ohio. The Dayton and Western Traction company operated six through cars daily between Dayton and Indianapolis. There was also a through freight service between the two cities. Imitating the practice of larger steam railroads, limited services on the line were given the romantic names Buckeye Express (for the eastbound train and Hoosier Express for the westbound run). Service along the Milton branch ceased on December 20, 1925.

Several lines were abandoned as the interurbans emanating from Indianapolis were consolidated under the Indiana Railroad. Richmond service would survive, though in an altered form. Starting in January 1932, service between Indianapolis and Dunreith was discontinued, forcing Richmond-bound trains to run to New Castle along the ex-Union Traction Company Honey Bee Route then south along the Dunreith–New Castle Line to the Richmond Line. The end of interchange traffic with the Cincinnati and Lake Erie Railroad in Ohio and rising operational costs made the line unprofitable by the mid-1930s. The final cars ran on May 9, 1937.

== Dunreith to New Castle branch ==
In 1906, the Schoepf-McGowan syndicate who then owned the line was considering a shortening of the Indianapolis to New Castle route by building from New Castle directly to Greenfield, a distance of 23 miles (37 km). The time saving was not deemed sufficient, however, to compensate for the construction cost of so much new track; a rival line was additionally being promoted from Indianapolis to New Castle. Consequently, the proposal was dropped.

On August 8, 1913, the Dunreith-Spiceland section of the New Castle spur was completed by the THI&E; the opening of the Spiceland to New Castle section was delayed by a dispute with the Lake Erie and Western Railroad over a switch crossing at Fourteenth Street in New Castle. On September 11, the branch line was formally opened and the next day was busily engaged hauling passengers to the Newcastle Old Settlers picnic.
