= Big Lake, Indiana =

- Census-designated place
- Location within Indiana Location within the United States
- Coordinates: 41°16′29″N 85°29′58″W
- Country: United States
- State: Indiana
- County: Noble
- Township: Noble

Area
  - Total: 0.87 sq mi (2.3 km^{2})
  - Land: 0.58 sq mi (1.5 km^{2})
  - Water: 0.29 sq mi (0.75 km^{2})
- Elevation: 902 ft (275 m)
- Time zone: UTC-5 (Eastern (EST))
  - Summer (DST): UTC-4 (EDT)
- ZIP codes: 46725 (Columbia City); 46701 (Albion)
- Area code: 260
- GNIS feature ID: 2830478
- FIPS code: 18-05231

Big Lake is an unincorporated community and census-designated place (CDP) in Noble County, Indiana, United States.

== Geography ==
Big Lake is in southern Noble County, surrounding the natural lake of the same name. Its southern edge is the Whitley County boundary. Indiana State Road 109 forms the eastern edge of the community; it leads north 4 miles (6 km) to Wolf Lake and south 8 miles (13 km) to Columbia City. Albion, the Noble county seat, is 11 miles (18 km) to the northeast of Big Lake.

According to the U.S. Census Bureau, the Big Lake CDP has an area of 0.87 square miles (2.25 km^{2}), of which 0.58 square miles (1.50 km^{2}) are land and 0.29 square miles (0.75 km^{2}), or 33.29%, are water. Big Lake is fed and drained by the Tippecanoe River, a west-flowing tributary of the Wabash River. The lake is just downstream from Crooked Lake, the source of the Tippecanoe.

== Demographics ==
The United States Census Bureau delineated Big Lake as a census designated place in the 2022 American Community Survey.
