= Mohawk, Indiana =

- Unincorporated community
- Location within Indiana Location within the United States
- Coordinates: 39°50′37″N 85°50′27″W
- Country: United States
- State: Indiana
- County: Hancock
- Township: Buck Creek
- Elevation: 869 ft (265 m)
- ZIP code: 46140
- FIPS code: 18-50076
- GNIS feature ID: 439311

Mohawk is an unincorporated community in Buck Creek Township, Hancock County, Indiana.

== History ==
Mohawk was laid out and platted in 1883. It was named after the Mohawk people.

A post office was established at Mohawk in 1882, and remained in operation until it was discontinued in 1955.
