= Susan Slaughter =

American orchestral trumpeter

- Born: McCordsville, Indiana
- Education: Indiana University School of Music; Aspen Music Festival and School
- Instrument: Trumpet
- Years active: 1967–2010
- Formerly of: St. Louis Symphony Orchestra

Susan Slaughter is an American orchestral trumpet player. She was principal trumpet player of the St. Louis Symphony Orchestra for 40 years, from 1972 until 2010. She is the first woman to hold the position of principal trumpet in a major American orchestra. She is also the founder of the International Women's Brass Conference and Monarch Brass, an all female brass ensemble.

== Education ==
Slaughter grew up in McCordsville, Indiana and began playing the trumpet at 10 years old, in her school band. She was not allowed to play in her high school band because of her gender, except for once as a substitute. She took private lessons through the Jordan Conservatory in Indianapolis, Indiana during high school. She attended Indiana University School of Music, studying with Herbert Mueller and graduating in 1967 with a Bachelor of Music Degree and Performer's Certificate. She studied with Robert Nagel at the Aspen Music Festival and School in 1966 and 1968. Other teachers include Arnold Jacobs, Herbert Müeller, Bernard Adelstein, Claude Gordon, and Laurie Frink.

== Career ==
Slaughter's first orchestral position was as principal trumpet of the Toledo Symphony Orchestra from 1967 to 1969. In 1969, she won the position of fourth trumpet in the Saint Louis Symphony. In 1972, she became acting principal trumpet after the principal trumpet resigned. For four months, she alternated as co-principal with a male trumpet player, but was offered the full-time principal position at the end of the year. Slaughter was principal trumpet for 40 years until her retirement in 2010.

Slaughter founded the International Women's Brass Conference in 1991, as well as the Monarch Brass Ensemble which has performed at each conference. Slaughter has received several awards, such as the YWCA Special Leadership Award in the Arts, the 2007 St. Louis Arts and Education council Excellence in the Arts award, and the American Federation of Musicians (local 2-197) Owen Miller Award for Loyalty, Dedication and Fairness in Actions and Deeds.

On her retirement in 2010, the trumpet section of the Saint Louis Symphony Orchestra established the Susan Slaughter Trumpet Scholarship at the Jacobs School of Music, Indiana, to support undergraduate trumpet students, with preference given to female students.
