= Blue River Township, Hancock County, Indiana =

Blue River Township
- Township
- Location in Hancock County
- Coordinates: 39°44′41″N 85°40′41″W
- Country: United States
- State: Indiana
- County: Hancock

Government
  - Type: Indiana township

Area
  - Total: 29.83 sq mi (77.3 km^{2})
  - Land: 29.75 sq mi (77.1 km^{2})
  - Water: 0.08 sq mi (0.21 km^{2}) 0.27%
- Elevation: 909 ft (277 m)

Population (2020)
  - Total: 1,441
  - Density: 47.6/sq mi (18.4/km^{2})
- GNIS feature ID: 0453117

Blue River Township is one of nine townships in Hancock County, Indiana, United States. As of the 2010 census, its population was 1,417 and it contained 542 housing units.

== History ==
Blue River was organized in 1828. It was named from the Blue River, once an important waterway for mills.

County Line Bridge was listed on the National Register of Historic Places in 1994.

== Geography ==
According to the 2010 census, the township has a total area of 29.83 square miles (77.3 km^{2}), of which 29.75 square miles (77.1 km^{2}) (or 99.73%) is land and 0.08 square miles (0.21 km^{2}) (or 0.27%) is water. The streams of Dilly Creek and Nameless Creek run through this township.

=== Unincorporated towns ===
- Westland

(This list is based on USGS data and may include former settlements.)

=== Adjacent townships ===
- Jackson Township (north)
- Ripley Township, Rush County (east)
- Hanover Township, Shelby County (south)
- Brandywine Township (west)
- Center Township (northwest)

=== Cemeteries ===
The township contains three cemeteries: Gilboa, Haskett, and Westland Friends Church.
