= Greenfield-Central Community School Corporation =

School district in Indiana, United States

Greenfield-Central Community School Corporation (GCSC) or Greenfield-Central Schools is a school district headquartered in Greenfield, Indiana.

== History ==
In 2019 the Indiana State Board of Accounts found that administrators of the GCSC received $651,000 more than they were supposed to, and as a result started a criminal investigation.

In 2019 the school district revised its administrative structure.

== Schools ==
Secondary

- Greenfield-Central High School
- Greenfield-Central Junior High School

Primary

- Intermediate schools:
  - Maxwell Intermediate School in Maxwell
- Elementary schools:
  - Eden
  - Harris
  - J. B. Stephens
  - Weston
