= Hancock County, Indiana =

County in Indiana, United States

- County
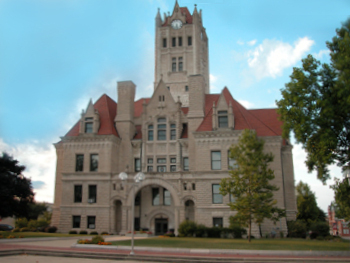
- Hancock County Courthouse in Greenfield

- Flag

- Location within the U.S. state of Indiana
- Coordinates: 39°49′N 85°46′W
- Country: United States
- State: Indiana
- Founded: March 1, 1828
- Named for: John Hancock
- Seat: Greenfield
- Largest city: Greenfield

Area
  - Total: 307.02 sq mi (795.2 km^{2})
  - Land: 306.02 sq mi (792.6 km^{2})
  - Water: 1.01 sq mi (2.6 km^{2}) 0.33%

Population (2020)
  - Total: 79,840
  - Estimate (2025): 90,969 ▲
  - Density: 260.9/sq mi (100.7/km^{2})
- Time zone: UTC−5 (Eastern)
  - Summer (DST): UTC−4 (EDT)
- Congressional district: 6th
- Website: www.hancockin.gov
- Indiana county number 30

Hancock County is a county in the U.S. state of Indiana. The 2020 United States census recorded a population of 79,840. The county seat is Greenfield.

Hancock County is included in the Indianapolis-Carmel-Anderson, IN Metropolitan Statistical Area.

== Geography ==
The terrain of Hancock County is low rolling hills, sloping to the south and southwest, carved by drainages. All available area is devoted to agriculture or urban development. The highest point is a small prominence in NW Shirley, at 1,040 ft (320 m) ASL. According to the 2010 census, the county has a total area of 307.02 square miles (795.2 km^{2}), of which 306.02 square miles (792.6 km^{2}) (or 99.67%) is land and 1.01 square miles (2.6 km^{2}) (or 0.33%) is water.

=== Adjacent counties ===
- Madison County - north
- Henry County - east
- Rush County - southeast
- Shelby County - south
- Marion County - west
- Hamilton County - northwest

=== Major highways ===
- Interstate 70
- U.S. Route 36
- U.S. Route 40
- U.S. Route 52
- State Road 9
- State Road 13
- State Road 67
- State Road 109
- State Road 234
- State Road 238

=== Airport ===
- KMQJ - Indianapolis Regional Airport

== History ==
Indiana was admitted as a state to the United States on December 11, 1816, although much of its territory was still disputed or held by native peoples at that time. These indigenous claims were quickly reduced and removed by various treaties. The 1818 Treaty with the Delaware Indians brought most of central Indiana into state control, and Madison County was organized on a portion of that area. The lower portion of Madison County was quickly settled, and by the late 1820s the inhabitants were petitioning for a separate county government. Accordingly, a portion of the county was partitioned on March 1, 1828, to form Hancock County. Greenfield was named as the county seat on April 11. The county name recognized John Hancock, president of the Continental Congress, who had signed his name prominently to the Declaration of Independence in 1776. The county has retained its original borders since its 1828 creation.

== Climate and weather ==
Greenfield, Indiana

Climate chart (precipitation, max. and min. temperature)
J	F	M	A	M	J	J	A	S	O	N	D
2.5 34 17	2.4 39 20	3.3 50 30	4.1 62 40	4.7 73 51	4.5 82 61	4.9 85 64	4 84 62	3.2 78 55	3.1 65 43	3.9 51 33	3.1 39 23
- █ Average max. and min. temperatures in °F
- █ Precipitation totals in inches
- Source: The Weather Channel
Metric conversion
J	F	M	A	M	J	J	A	S	O	N	D
63 1 −8	60 4 −7	85 10 −1	103 17 4	119 23 11	114 28 16	123 29 18	102 29 17	80 26 13	77 18 6	99 11 1	78 4 −5
- █ Average max. and min. temperatures in °C
- █ Precipitation totals in mm

In recent years, average temperatures in Greenfield have ranged from a low of 17 °F (−8 °C) in January to a high of 85 °F (29 °C) in July, although a record low of −29 °F (−34 °C) was recorded in January 1985 and a record high of 103 °F (39 °C) was recorded in June 1988. Average monthly precipitation ranged from 2.37 inches (60 mm) in February to 4.85 inches (123 mm) in July.

== Government ==
Hancock County Sheriff's Department

Jurisdictional structure
- Operations jurisdiction: Hancock County, Indiana, Indiana, United States
- Legal jurisdiction: As per operations jurisdiction
- General nature: Local civilian police

Operational structure
- Agency executive: Michael Shepherd, Sheriff

The county government is a constitutional body, and is granted specific powers by the Constitution of Indiana, and by the Indiana Code.

County Council: The legislative branch of the county government; controls the county's spending and revenue collection. Representatives are elected from county districts. The council members serve staggered four-year terms. They are responsible for setting salaries, the annual budget, and special spending. The council also has limited authority to impose local taxes, in the form of an income and property tax that is subject to state level approval, excise taxes, and service taxes.

Board of Commissioners: The executive body of the county. The commissioners are elected county-wide, in staggered four-year terms. One commissioner serves as president. The commissioners carry out the acts legislated by the council, collecting revenue, and managing the day-to-day functions of the county government.

Court: The county maintains a small claims court that can handle some civil cases. The judge on the court is elected to a term of four years and must be a member of the Indiana Bar Association. The judge is assisted by a constable who is also elected to a four-year term. In some cases, court decisions can be appealed to the state level circuit court.

County Officials: The county has several other elected offices, including sheriff, coroner, auditor, treasurer, recorder, surveyor, and circuit court clerk. They are elected to four-year terms. Members elected to county government positions are required to declare party affiliations and to be residents of the county.

Hancock County is part of Indiana's 5th congressional district; Indiana Senate district 28; and Indiana House of Representatives districts 29 and 53.

United States presidential election results for Hancock County, Indiana
Year	Republican		Democratic		Third party(ies)	
Year	No.	%	No.	%	No.	%
1888	1,986	44.68%	2,376	53.45%	83	1.87%
1892	1,932	42.65%	2,329	51.41%	269	5.94%
1896	2,236	43.22%	2,886	55.79%	51	0.99%
1900	2,295	43.03%	2,930	54.93%	109	2.04%
1904	2,633	46.39%	2,806	49.44%	237	4.18%
1908	2,472	43.50%	3,040	53.49%	171	3.01%
1912	738	14.77%	2,594	51.90%	1,666	33.33%
1916	2,138	41.56%	2,779	54.02%	227	4.41%
1920	4,422	46.16%	4,958	51.76%	199	2.08%
1924	4,063	47.27%	4,364	50.77%	168	1.95%
1928	4,788	56.49%	3,626	42.78%	62	0.73%
1932	4,055	40.22%	5,836	57.89%	190	1.88%
1936	4,174	41.00%	5,962	58.57%	44	0.43%
1940	5,283	48.98%	5,417	50.23%	85	0.79%
1944	5,139	51.71%	4,652	46.81%	147	1.48%
1948	4,721	48.05%	4,948	50.36%	157	1.60%
1952	6,964	59.94%	4,539	39.07%	116	1.00%
1956	6,962	59.93%	4,600	39.60%	55	0.47%
1960	7,543	60.21%	4,930	39.35%	55	0.44%
1964	6,370	49.03%	6,573	50.59%	50	0.38%
1968	7,516	56.23%	3,902	29.19%	1,948	14.57%
1972	11,019	77.87%	3,069	21.69%	62	0.44%
1976	10,072	61.31%	6,191	37.69%	164	1.00%
1980	12,093	66.67%	5,124	28.25%	921	5.08%
1984	12,880	73.58%	4,550	25.99%	74	0.42%
1988	13,374	71.21%	5,355	28.51%	51	0.27%
1992	11,072	53.65%	4,752	23.02%	4,815	23.33%
1996	12,907	60.23%	6,123	28.57%	2,398	11.19%
2000	15,943	69.47%	6,503	28.34%	504	2.20%
2004	20,771	74.54%	6,912	24.80%	184	0.66%
2008	22,008	64.25%	11,874	34.67%	371	1.08%
2012	22,796	69.41%	9,319	28.37%	728	2.22%
2016	25,074	68.76%	8,904	24.42%	2,490	6.83%
2020	28,996	67.40%	12,895	29.97%	1,129	2.62%
2024	29,288	65.69%	14,312	32.10%	984	2.21%

== Education ==
Hancock County is served by two library systems, the Fortville-Vernon Township Public Library and Hancock County Public Library.

The county's school districts include:

- Eastern Hancock County Community School Corporation
- Greenfield-Central Community Schools
- Mount Vernon Community School Corporation
- Community School Corporation of Southern Hancock County

== Demographics ==
Historical population
Census	Pop.	Note	%±
1830	1,436		—
1840	7,535		424.7%
1850	9,698		28.7%
1860	12,802		32.0%
1870	15,123		18.1%
1880	17,123		13.2%
1890	17,829		4.1%
1900	19,189		7.6%
1910	19,030		−0.8%
1920	17,210		−9.6%
1930	16,605		−3.5%
1940	17,302		4.2%
1950	20,332		17.5%
1960	26,665		31.1%
1970	35,096		31.6%
1980	43,939		25.2%
1990	45,527		3.6%
2000	55,391		21.7%
2010	70,002		26.4%
2020	79,840		14.1%
2025 (est.)	90,969	▲	13.9%
US Decennial Census; 1790-1960 1900-1990; 1990-2000 2010-2013

=== Racial and ethnic composition ===
Hancock County, Indiana – Racial and ethnic composition Note: the US Census treats Hispanic/Latino as an ethnic category. This table excludes Latinos from the racial categories and assigns them to a separate category. Hispanics/Latinos may be of any race.
Race / Ethnicity (NH = Non-Hispanic)	Pop 1980	Pop 1990	Pop 2000	Pop 2010	Pop 2020	% 1980	% 1990	% 2000	% 2010	% 2020
White alone (NH)	43,425	44,933	54,155	65,859	71,106	98.83%	98.70%	97.77%	94.08%	89.06%
Black or African American alone (NH)	43	41	74	1,420	2,346	0.10%	0.09%	0.13%	2.03%	2.94%
Native American or Alaska Native alone (NH)	36	50	85	136	121	0.08%	0.11%	0.15%	0.19%	0.15%
Asian alone (NH)	108	164	203	554	734	0.25%	0.36%	0.37%	0.79%	0.92%
Native Hawaiian or Pacific Islander alone (NH)	x	x	10	14	42	x	x	0.02%	0.02%	0.05%
Other race alone (NH)	56	6	15	57	219	0.13%	0.01%	0.03%	0.08%	0.27%
Mixed race or Multiracial (NH)	x	x	323	746	3,070	x	x	0.58%	1.07%	3.85%
Hispanic or Latino (any race)	271	333	526	1,216	2,202	0.62%	0.73%	0.95%	1.74%	2.76%
Total	43,939	45,527	55,391	70,002	79,840	100.00%	100.00%	100.00%	100.00%	100.00%

=== 2020 census ===
As of the 2020 census, the county had a population of 79,840. The median age was 40.6 years. 23.8% of residents were under the age of 18 and 17.3% of residents were 65 years of age or older. For every 100 females there were 96.4 males, and for every 100 females age 18 and over there were 93.5 males age 18 and over.

The racial makeup of the county was 89.8% White, 3.0% Black or African American, 0.2% American Indian and Alaska Native, 0.9% Asian, 0.1% Native Hawaiian and Pacific Islander, 1.0% from some other race, and 5.0% from two or more races. Hispanic or Latino residents of any race comprised 2.8% of the population.

72.3% of residents lived in urban areas, while 27.7% lived in rural areas.

There were 30,837 households in the county, of which 32.9% had children under the age of 18 living in them. Of all households, 57.4% were married-couple households, 14.3% were households with a male householder and no spouse or partner present, and 22.0% were households with a female householder and no spouse or partner present. About 22.7% of all households were made up of individuals and 10.3% had someone living alone who was 65 years of age or older.

There were 32,125 housing units, of which 4.0% were vacant. Among occupied housing units, 78.5% were owner-occupied and 21.5% were renter-occupied. The homeowner vacancy rate was 1.1% and the rental vacancy rate was 5.8%.

=== 2010 census ===
As of the 2010 United States census, there were 70,002 people, 26,304 households, and 19,792 families in the county. The population density was 228.8 inhabitants per square mile (88.3/km^{2}). There were 28,125 housing units at an average density of 91.9 per square mile (35.5/km^{2}). The racial makeup of the county was 95.2% white, 2.1% black or African American, 0.8% Asian, 0.2% American Indian, 0.4% from other races, and 1.2% from two or more races. Those of Hispanic or Latino origin made up 1.7% of the population. In terms of ancestry, 26.2% were German, 13.9% were Irish, 11.8% were English, and 11.8% were American.

Of the 26,304 households, 37.2% had children under the age of 18 living with them, 61.0% were married couples living together, 9.8% had a female householder with no husband present, 24.8% were non-families, and 20.3% of all households were made up of individuals. The average household size was 2.64 and the average family size was 3.03. The median age was 39.1 years.

The median income for a household in the county was $47,697 and the median income for a family was $69,734. Males had a median income of $53,565 versus $38,042 for females. The per capita income for the county was $28,017. About 5.9% of families and 7.3% of the population were below the poverty line, including 8.0% of those under age 18 and 5.2% of those age 65 or over.

== Cities and towns ==
- Cumberland (extends into Marion County)
- Fortville
- Greenfield
- McCordsville
- New Palestine
- Shirley (extends into Henry County)
- Spring Lake
- Wilkinson

== Townships ==
- Blue River
- Brandywine
- Brown
- Buck Creek
- Center
- Green
- Jackson
- Sugar Creek
- Vernon

=== Unincorporated communities ===
- Carrollton
- Charlottesville (extends into Rush County)
- Cleveland
- Eden
- Finly (also known as Carrollton)
- Gem
- Maxwell
- Milners Corner
- Mohawk
- Mount Comfort
- Nashville
- Philadelphia
- Pleasant Acres
- Riley
- Stringtown
- Warrington
- Westland
- Willow Branch
- Woodbury

== See also ==
- Daily Reporter, daily newspaper covering Hancock County (published in Greenfield)
- Edward E. Moore, Indiana state senator and Los Angeles City Council member
- National Register of Historic Places listings in Hancock County, Indiana
