= Eden, Indiana =

- Unincorporated community and Census-designated place
- Location within Indiana Location within the United States
- Coordinates: 39°54′14″N 85°46′10″W
- Country: United States
- State: Indiana
- County: Hancock
- Township: Green
- Elevation: 883 ft (269 m)
- ZIP code: 46140
- FIPS code: 18-20188
- GNIS feature ID: 2830399

Eden is an unincorporated community in Green Township, Hancock County, Indiana.

== History ==
Eden was laid out and platted in 1835. A post office was established at Eden in 1834, and remained in operation until it was discontinued in 1905.

== Demographics ==
The United States Census Bureau first delineated Eden as a census designated place in the 2022 American Community Survey.
