= Center Township, Hancock County, Indiana =

Center Township
- Township
- Location in Hancock County
- Coordinates: 39°48′58″N 85°46′30″W
- Country: United States
- State: Indiana
- County: Hancock

Government
  - Type: Indiana township

Area
  - Total: 53.44 sq mi (138.4 km^{2})
  - Land: 53 sq mi (140 km^{2})
  - Water: 0.44 sq mi (1.1 km^{2}) 0.82%
- Elevation: 909 ft (277 m)

Population (2020)
  - Total: 28,724
  - Density: 487.2/sq mi (188.1/km^{2})
- GNIS feature ID: 0453180
- Website: www.centerhancockin.gov

Center Township is one of nine townships in Hancock County, Indiana, United States. As of the 2010 census, its population was 25,819 and it contained 10,909 housing units.

== History ==
Center Township was organized in 1831. It was named from its position at the geographical center of Hancock County.

== Geography ==
According to the 2010 census, the township has a total area of 53.44 square miles (138.4 km^{2}), of which 53 square miles (140 km^{2}) (or 99.18%) is land and 0.44 square miles (1.1 km^{2}) (or 0.82%) is water. Lakes in this township include Roberts Lake. The stream of Little Brandywine Creek runs through this township.

=== Cities and towns ===
- Greenfield (vast majority)

=== Unincorporated towns ===
- Bowman Acres
- Cooper Corner
- Maxwell
- Riley
- Sugar Hills

(This list is based on USGS data and may include former settlements.)

=== Adjacent townships ===
- Green Township (north)
- Jackson Township (east)
- Blue River Township (southeast)
- Brandywine Township (south)
- Sugar Creek Township (southwest)
- Buck Creek Township (west)
- Vernon Township (northwest)

=== Cemeteries ===
The township contains eleven cemeteries: Alford, Barrett, Caldwell, Cooper, Hinchman, Mount Carmel, Park, Pratt, Reeves, Sugar Creek and Willet.

=== Major highways ===
- Interstate 70
- U.S. Route 40
- State Road 9

=== Airports and landing strips ===
- Pope Field
