= Merry Lea Environmental Center =

Coordinates: 41°19′05″N 85°30′50″W

Merry Lea Environmental Learning Center of Goshen College is located just south of Wolf Lake at Bear Lake in Noble County, Indiana, United States. Merry Lea is the largest privately held land reserve in the state of Indiana. The center serves as a field laboratory for students at Goshen College who are studying ecology, environmental education and agroecology. In addition, Merry Lea provides environmental educational experiences for elementary students in the center's service area which includes the Fort Wayne metropolitan area as well as Warsaw, Huntington, Kendallville, Goshen and Elkhart.

The facility's 1,150 acres (4.6 km^{2}) include most of northern Indiana's ecosystems including peat bogs, swamp maple forest, upland mesic forest, old field, prairie, and lakeshore. An esker deposit with 50 ft (15 m) relief that extends for nearly half a mile (1 km) is the most striking geological feature. The center also features Rieth Village, a complex of energy efficient buildings completed in 2006 that provide housing and classrooms for college students. Rieth Village features a 10 kW wind generator mounted on a 100 ft (30 m) tower and 4.8 kW photovoltaic array.
