= Milners Corner, Indiana =

Coordinates: 39°54′58″N 85°41′32″W

Milners Corner is an unincorporated community in Hancock County, Indiana, in the United States.

== History ==
Milners Corner was named in 1850 for James Milner. A post office was established at Milners Corner in 1868, and remained in operation until it was discontinued in 1903.
