= Gem, Indiana =

- Unincorporated community
- Location within Indiana Location within the United States
- Coordinates: 39°46′46″N 85°53′48″W
- Country: United States
- State: Indiana
- County: Hancock
- Township: Sugar Creek
- Elevation: 856 ft (261 m)
- ZIP code: 46140
- FIPS code: 18-27198
- GNIS feature ID: 435008

Gem is an unincorporated community in Sugar Creek Township, Hancock County, Indiana.

== History ==
Gem was never properly laid out or platted. A store and a saw mill were built at Gem in 1871.

A post office was established at Gem in 1877, and remained in operation until it was discontinued in 1907.
