= Bear Lake, Indiana =

- Unincorporated community and Census designated place
- Location within Indiana Location within the United States
- Coordinates: 41°19′27″N 85°30′55″W
- Country: United States
- State: Indiana
- County: Noble
- Township: Noble

Area
  - Water: 0.212500 sq mi (0.550372 km^{2})
- Elevation: 896 ft (273 m)

Population
  - Estimate (2024): 232
- Time zone: UTC-5 (Eastern (EST))
  - Summer (DST): UTC-4 (EDT)
- ZIP code: 46701
- Area code: 260
- GNIS feature ID: 2830477

Bear Lake is a lakeside community in Noble Township, Noble County, in the U.S. state of Indiana. Points of interest include Bear Lake Camp, Bear Lake Church, Elwood H. Thomas Public Beach, and Merry Lea Environmental Center.

== Bear Lake Camp ==
Bear Lake Camp is a Christian summer camp for students entering grades 2–12. Bear Lake Camp is also the location of the Bear Lake Church.

== Elwood H. Thomas Public Beach ==
The Elwood H. Thomas Public Beach is a public beach run and kept up by the East Shore Property Owners Association. It is the only privately owned public beach in the state of Indiana.

== Merry Lea Environmental Center ==
Merry Lea Environmental Learning Center of Goshen College is located just south of Wolflake at Bear Lake in Noble County, Indiana. Merry Lea is the largest privately held land reserve in the state of Indiana. The center serves as a field laboratory for students at Goshen College who are studying ecology, environmental education and agroecology. In addition, Merry Lea provides environmental educational experiences for elementary students in the center's service area which includes the Fort Wayne metropolitan area as well as Warsaw, Huntington, Kendallville, Goshen and Elkhart.

== Geography ==
Bear Lake is located 28 miles (45 km) northwest of Fort Wayne, Indiana.

== Demographics ==
The United States Census Bureau delineated Bear Lake as a census designated place in the 2022 American Community Survey.
