= Jackson Township, Hancock County, Indiana =

Jackson Township
- Township
- Location in Hancock County
- Coordinates: 39°49′44″N 85°38′59″W
- Country: United States
- State: Indiana
- County: Hancock

Government
  - Type: Indiana township

Area
  - Total: 35.59 sq mi (92.2 km^{2})
  - Land: 35.54 sq mi (92.0 km^{2})
  - Water: 0.05 sq mi (0.13 km^{2}) 0.14%
- Elevation: 958 ft (292 m)

Population (2020)
  - Total: 1,751
  - Density: 50.2/sq mi (19.4/km^{2})
- GNIS feature ID: 0453447

Jackson Township is one of nine townships in Hancock County, Indiana, United States. As of the 2010 census, its population was 1,786 and it contained 696 housing units.

== History ==
Jackson Township was organized in 1831 during the May term. The board of commissioners of Hancock county was formed to include what is now Jackson and Brown townships. It was named for President Andrew Jackson.

== Geography ==
According to the 2010 census, the township has a total area of 35.59 square miles (92.2 km^{2}), of which 35.54 square miles (92.0 km^{2}) (or 99.86%) is land and 0.05 square miles (0.13 km^{2}) (or 0.14%) is water. Lakes in this township include Perry Lake. The streams of Anthony Creek, Morris Creek and Willow Branch run through this township.

=== Unincorporated towns ===
- Charlottesville
- Cleveland
- Pleasant Hill

(This list is based on USGS data and may include former settlements.)

=== Adjacent townships ===
- Brown Township (north)
- Wayne Township, Henry County (east)
- Ripley Township, Rush County (southeast)
- Blue River Township (south)
- Center Township (west)
- Green Township (northwest)

=== Cemeteries ===
The township contains two cemeteries: Simmons and Sixmile.

=== Major highways ===
- Interstate 70
- U.S. Route 40
