= Greenfield-Central High School =

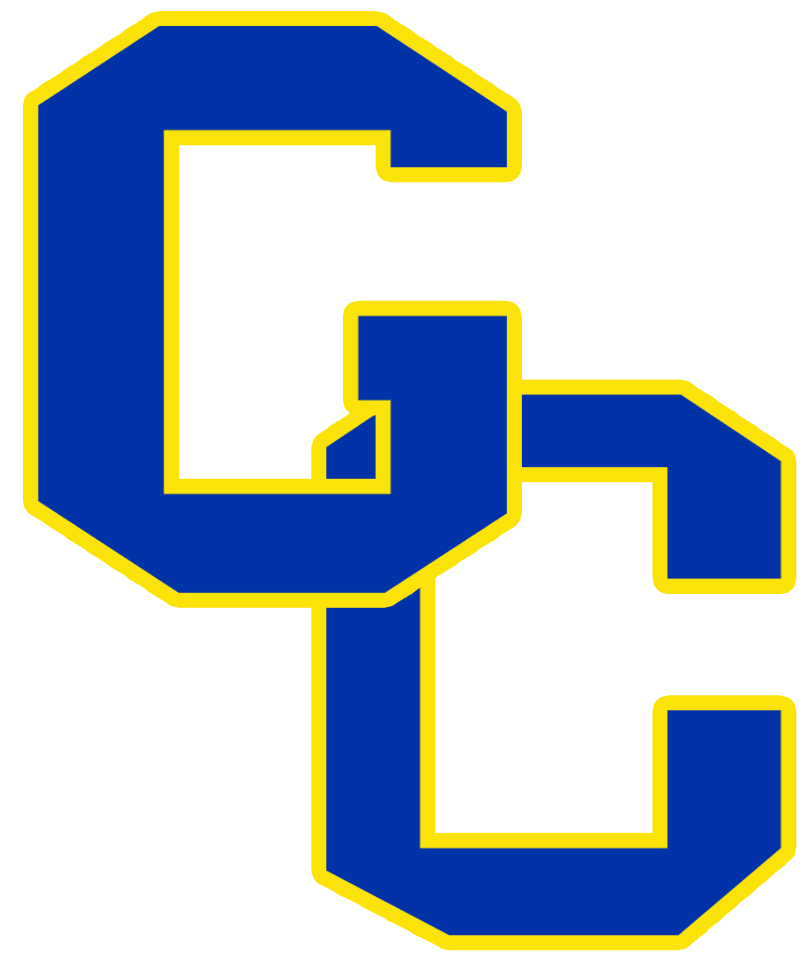

Location
- 810 North Broadway Street; Greenfield, Indiana 46140-1496; United States; 39°47′32″N 85°46′52″W

Information
- Type: Public high school
- Established: 1969
- School district: Greenfield-Central Community School Corporation
- Superintendent: Harold Olin
- CEEB code: 151-350
- Principal: Daniel Walbaum
- Teaching staff: 88.50 (FTE)
- Grades: 9-12
- Enrollment: 1,430 (2023–2024)
- Student to teacher ratio: 16.16
- Color
- Fight song: Old Gold and Blue
- Athletics conference: Hoosier Heritage Conference
- Nickname: Cougars
- Website: gchs.gcsc.k12.in.us

Greenfield-Central High School is a secondary school (grades 9–12) located in the city of Greenfield, Indiana. It is under the management of the Greenfield-Central Community School Corporation. It had 1,363 students in 2009–2010.

The high school has television studio facilities and operates broadcast radio station WRGF. The public-access television cable TV is named GCTV.

== History ==
The first class to graduate from Greenfield High School was the class of 1879. It was a three-year program to complete studies until 1887 when it became a four-year institution. The first four-year class to graduate was the class of 1888. In 2018 the district added a resource officer position that was full time to the high school.

== Athletics ==
Greenfield-Central High School is part of the Hoosier Heritage Conference. The school offers soccer, tennis, cross country, football, golf, volleyball, basketball, swimming, wrestling, baseball, softball, cheerleading, dance team, and track and field. Greenfield-Central holds one state title in football (1973). Two individual titles were won for wrestling (1979 Terry Edon, 2013 Joshua Farrell) and one was won for swimming (2017 Zach Cook 100 Butterfly). The school gained a state title in cheerleading.

== Music programs ==
Greenfield-Central High School has enjoyed success with its marching band program, the Greenfield-Central Cougar Pride. In Indiana State School Music Association (ISSMA) Marching Band Class B competition, the Cougar Pride placed eighth in 2005, ninth in 2014, and as state runner-up in 2016 and 2018. In November 2019, the Cougar Pride won the ISSMA Class B Indiana State Marching Band Championship at Lucas Oil Stadium in Indianapolis. After ISSMA competition was suspended for the 2020 season due to the worldwide COVID-19 pandemic, the Cougar Pride successfully defended their title by again winning the ISSMA Class B Indiana State Marching Band Championship on November 6, 2021, at Lucas Oil Stadium.

== Notable alumni ==
- Mike Edwards (Class of 1969) – 1972 co-Southeastern Conference Men's Basketball Player of the Year
- Kyle Gibson (Class of 2006) – Baseball player (pitcher/infielder) at Greenfield-Central High School and pitcher at University of Missouri, starting pitcher for Minnesota Twins, first-round pick (22nd overall) in 2009 MLB Amateur Draft
- Drey Jameson (Class of 2017) - Baseball player (pitcher) in high school and at Ball State University. Drafted by the Arizona Diamondbacks in 2019 as the 34th overall pick.
- Lane Wadle (Class of 2024) - Football Player (Tight end) in high school and at Georgia State University. First graduate in school history to be selected to an NCAA FBS Division I university on a football scholarship.
- Braylon Mullins (Class of 2025) - Basketball Player (Shooting Guard) in high school and at University of Connecticut. Mullins received a full ride scholarship to play basketball for the UCONN Huskies.

== See also ==
- List of high schools in Indiana
