= Fountaintown, Indiana =

- Unincorporated community and Census-designated place
- Location within Indiana Location within the United States
- Coordinates: 39°41′39″N 85°46′55″W
- Country: United States
- State: Indiana
- County: Shelby
- Township: Van Buren
- Elevation: 843 ft (257 m)
- Time zone: UTC-5 (Eastern (EST))
  - Summer (DST): UTC-4 (EDT)
- ZIP code: 46130
- FIPS code: 18-25162
- GNIS feature ID: 2830529

Fountaintown is an unincorporated community in Van Buren Township, Shelby County, in the U.S. state of Indiana.

== History ==
Fountaintown was laid out in 1854 by Matthew Fountain, and named for him. The railroad was extended to Fountaintown in 1867. The post office at Fountaintown has been in operation since 1869.

Fountaintown had its own high school in the early half of the 20th century.

== Demographics ==
The United States Census Bureau first delineated Fountaintown as a census designated place in the 2022 American Community Survey.
