= Mount Comfort, Indiana =

- Unincorporated community
- Location within Indiana Location within the United States
- Coordinates: 39°49′51″N 85°54′55″W
- Country: United States
- State: Indiana
- County: Hancock
- Township: Buck Creek
- Elevation: 856 ft (261 m)
- ZIP code: 46140
- FIPS code: 18-51390
- GNIS feature ID: 439557

Mount Comfort is an unincorporated community in Buck Creek Township, Hancock County, Indiana.

== History ==
A post office was established at Mount Comfort in 1851, and remained in operation until it was discontinued in 1956.

Mount Comfort was platted as a town in about 1882, when the railroad was extended to that point.
