= Westwood, Indiana =

- Unincorporated community and Census-designated place
- Location within Indiana Location within the United States
- Coordinates: 39°55′02″N 85°25′03″W
- Country: United States
- State: Indiana
- County: Henry
- Township: Henry
- Elevation: 1,056 ft (322 m)
- ZIP code: 47362
- FIPS code: 18-83456
- GNIS feature ID: 2830410

Westwood is an unincorporated community in Henry Township, Henry County, Indiana.

Westwood was founded in 1923.

== Geography ==
Westwood is located near New Castle and is the home of Westwood Park.

== Demographics ==
Historical population
Census	Pop.	Note	%±
2023 (est.)	555

The United States Census Bureau defined Westwood as a census designated place in the 2022 American Community Survey.
