= Willow Branch, Indiana =

- Unincorporated community and Census-designated place
- Location within Indiana Location within the United States
- Coordinates: 39°52′34″N 85°41′04″W
- Country: United States
- State: Indiana
- County: Hancock
- Township: Brown
- Elevation: 938 ft (286 m)
- ZIP code: 46186
- FIPS code: 18-84482
- GNIS feature ID: 2830403

Willow Branch is an unincorporated community in Brown Township, Hancock County, Indiana.

== History ==
The first store in Willow Branch was established in 1874. The community took its name from the stream upon which it is located, the Willow Branch creek.

Willow Branch was platted as a town in 1882.

== Demographics ==
Historical population
Census	Pop.	Note	%±
2023 (est.)	129

The United States Census Bureau defined Willow Branch as a census designated place in the 2022 American Community Survey.
