= Van Buren Township, Shelby County, Indiana =

Van Buren Township
- Township
- Coordinates: 39°39′43″N 85°47′31″W
- Country: United States
- State: Indiana
- County: Shelby

Government
  - Type: Indiana township

Area
  - Total: 27.91 sq mi (72.3 km^{2})
  - Land: 27.9 sq mi (72 km^{2})
  - Water: 0.01 sq mi (0.026 km^{2})
- Elevation: 837 ft (255 m)

Population (2020)
  - Total: 1,452
  - Density: 53/sq mi (20/km^{2})
- FIPS code: 18-78578
- GNIS feature ID: 453952

Van Buren Township is one of fourteen townships in Shelby County, Indiana. As of the 2010 census, its population was 1,480 and it contained 622 housing units.

The township was named for Martin Van Buren, the eighth President of the United States.

== Geography ==
According to the 2010 census, the township has a total area of 27.91 square miles (72.3 km^{2}), of which 27.9 square miles (72 km^{2}) (or 99.96%) is land and 0.01 square miles (0.026 km^{2}) (or 0.04%) is water.

=== Unincorporated towns ===
- Fountaintown
