= McCordsville, Indiana =

- Town
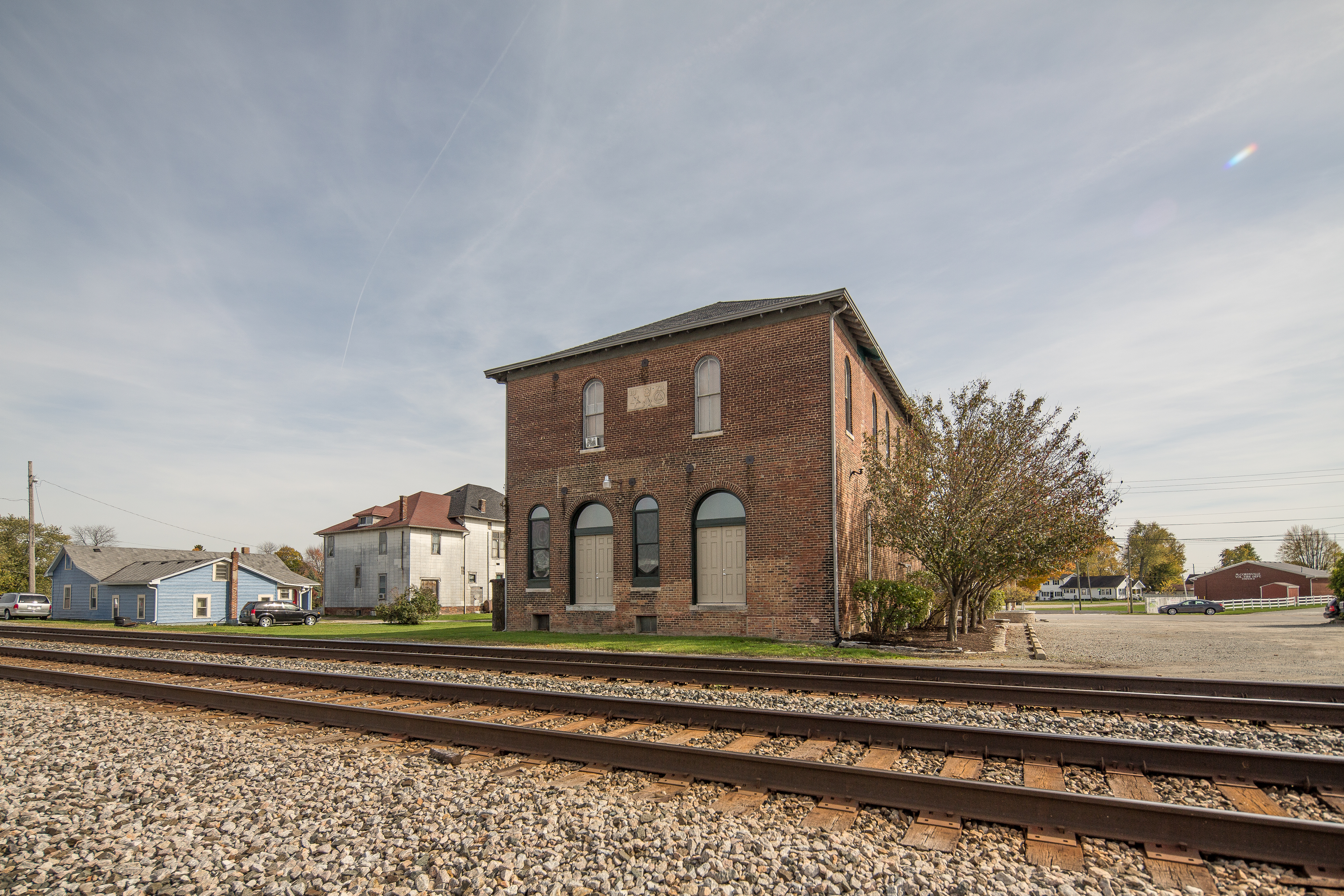

- Seal

- Location of McCordsville in Hancock County, Indiana.
- Coordinates: 39°52′50″N 85°55′08″W
- Country: United States
- State: Indiana
- County: Hancock
- Township: Vernon
- Platted: 1865
- Incorporated: 1988

Government
  - Town manager: Tim Gropp

Area
  - Total: 7.20 sq mi (18.65 km^{2})
  - Land: 7.14 sq mi (18.50 km^{2})
  - Water: 0.058 sq mi (0.15 km^{2})
- Elevation: 850 ft (260 m)

Population (2020)
  - Total: 8,503
  - Estimate (2025): 13,094
  - Density: 1,190.4/sq mi (459.62/km^{2})
- Time zone: UTC-5 (Eastern (EST))
  - Summer (DST): UTC-4 (EDT)
- ZIP code: 46055
- Area code: 317
- FIPS code: 18-45648
- GNIS feature ID: 2396744
- Website: http://www.mccordsville.org/

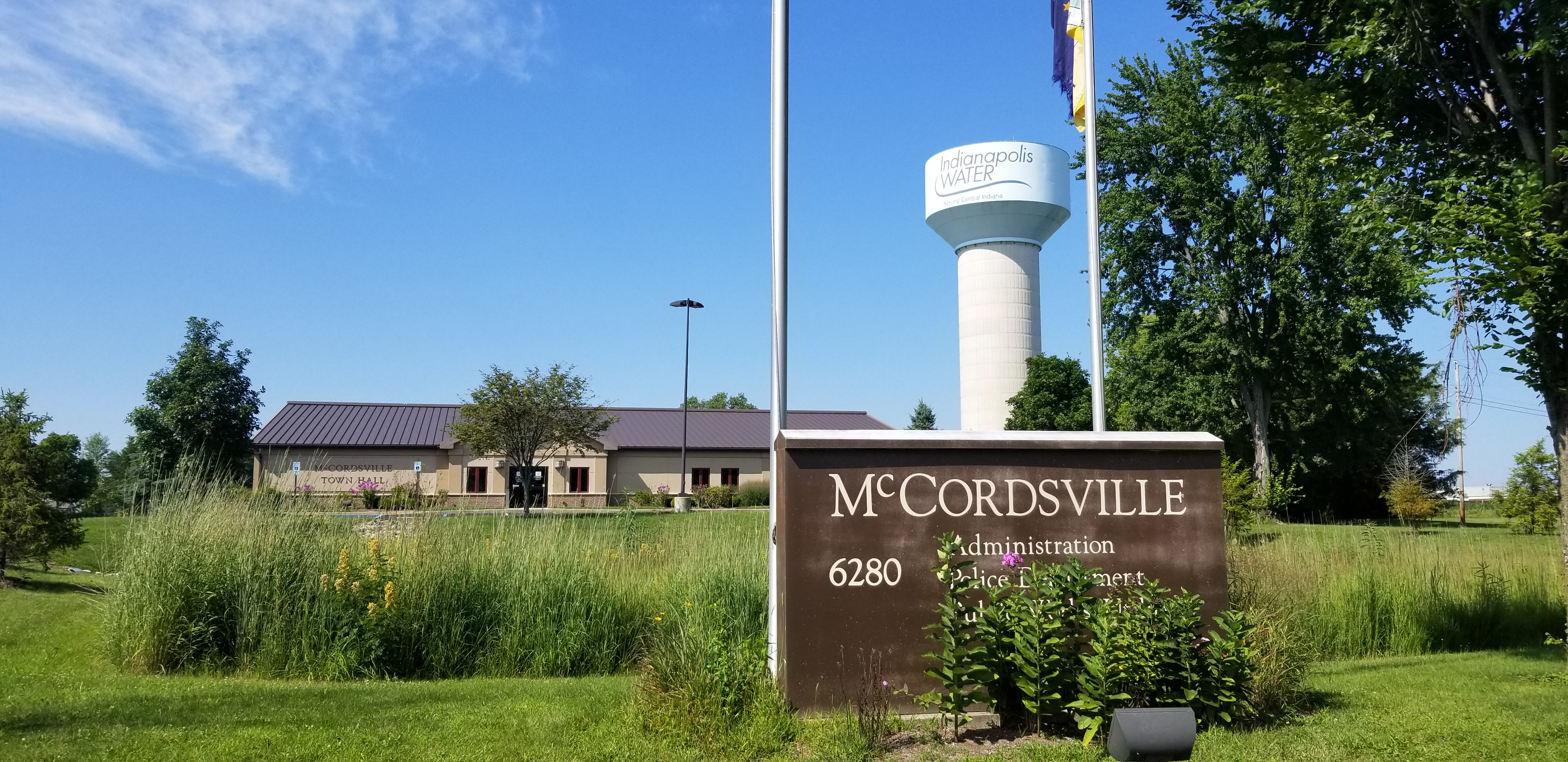
Photo of the McCordsville Town Hall

McCordsville is a town in Vernon Township, Hancock County, Indiana, United States. The town is a fast-growing suburb of Indianapolis with an estimated population of 8,592 in 2020.

== History ==
McCordsville was laid out and platted in 1865. It was named for one or more members of the McCord family. McCordsville was incorporated in 1988.

== Geography ==
According to the 2010 census, McCordsville has a total area of 4.71 square miles (12.20 km^{2}), of which 4.7 square miles (12.17 km^{2}) (or 99.79%) is land and 0.01 square miles (0.03 km^{2}) (or 0.21%) is water.

== Demographics ==
Historical population
Census	Pop.	Note	%±
1870	168		—
1880	180		7.1%
1990	684		—
2000	1,134		65.8%
2010	4,797		323.0%
2020	8,503		77.3%
2025 (est.)	13,094		54.0%
U.S. Decennial Census

=== 2020 census ===
As of the 2020 census, McCordsville had a population of 8,503. The median age was 35.6 years. 30.2% of residents were under the age of 18 and 10.7% of residents were 65 years of age or older. For every 100 females there were 94.2 males, and for every 100 females age 18 and over there were 90.1 males age 18 and over.

97.9% of residents lived in urban areas, while 2.1% lived in rural areas.

There were 2,940 households in McCordsville, of which 45.2% had children under the age of 18 living in them. Of all households, 65.2% were married-couple households, 10.1% were households with a male householder and no spouse or partner present, and 19.3% were households with a female householder and no spouse or partner present. About 17.7% of all households were made up of individuals and 8.0% had someone living alone who was 65 years of age or older.

There were 3,028 housing units, of which 2.9% were vacant. The homeowner vacancy rate was 1.2% and the rental vacancy rate was 6.3%.

Racial composition as of the 2020 census
Race	Number	Percent
White	6,671	78.5%
Black or African American	836	9.8%
American Indian and Alaska Native	21	0.2%
Asian	222	2.6%
Native Hawaiian and Other Pacific Islander	1	0.0%
Some other race	145	1.7%
Two or more races	607	7.1%
Hispanic or Latino (of any race)	445	5.2%

=== 2010 census ===
As of the census of 2010, there were 4,797 people, 1,653 households, and 1,322 families living in the town. The population density was 1,020.6 inhabitants per square mile (394.1/km^{2}). There were 1,717 housing units at an average density of 365.3 per square mile (141.0/km^{2}). The racial makeup of the town was 83.2% White, 10.3% African American, 0.3% Native American, 2.3% Asian, 1.3% from other races, and 2.6% from two or more races. Hispanic or Latino of any race were 4.4% of the population.

There were 1,653 households, of which 50.4% had children under the age of 18 living with them, 66.5% were married couples living together, 10.0% had a female householder with no husband present, 3.5% had a male householder with no wife present, and 20.0% were non-families. 15.1% of all households were made up of individuals, and 3.1% had someone living alone who was 65 years of age or older. The average household size was 2.90 and the average family size was 3.26.

The median age in the town was 32.7 years. 32.4% of residents were under the age of 18; 5.2% were between the ages of 18 and 24; 34.9% were from 25 to 44; 22.5% were from 45 to 64; and 5% were 65 years of age or older. The gender makeup of the town was 48.4% male and 51.6% female.

=== 2000 census ===
As of the census in 2000, there were 1,134 people, 381 households, and 324 families living in the town. The population density was 354.0 inhabitants per square mile (136.7/km^{2}). There were 409 housing units at an average density of 127.7 per square mile (49.3/km^{2}). The racial makeup of the town was 97.00% White, 0.62% African American, 0.18% Native American, 0.62% from other races, and 1.59% from two or more races. Hispanic or Latino of any race were 1.15% of the population.

There were 381 households, out of which 45.1% had children under the age of 18 living with them, 75.6% were Married Couples living together, 6.0% had a female householder with no husband present, and 14.7% were non-families. 12.1% of all households were made up of individuals, and 5.0% had someone living alone who was 65 years of age or older. The average household size was 2.98 and the average family size was 3.25.

In the town, the population was spread out, with 30.5% under the age of 18, 5.5% from 18 to 24, 34.5% from 25 to 44, 22.6% from 45 to 64, and 7.0% who were 65 years of age or older. The median age was 36 years. For every 100 females, there were 97.6 males. For every 100 females age 18 and over, there were 99.5 males.

The median income for a household in the town was $68,750, and the median income for a family was $77,000. Males had a median income of $52,450 versus $34,583 for females. The per capita income for the town was $30,250. None of the population or families were below the poverty line.

== Education ==
The Geist Montessori Academy, a public charter school, is located in McCordsville. The Indiana public school system that serves the town is the Mt. Vernon Community School Corporation.

== Notable people ==
- Susan Slaughter, orchestral trumpeter
