= Wilkinson, Indiana =

- Town
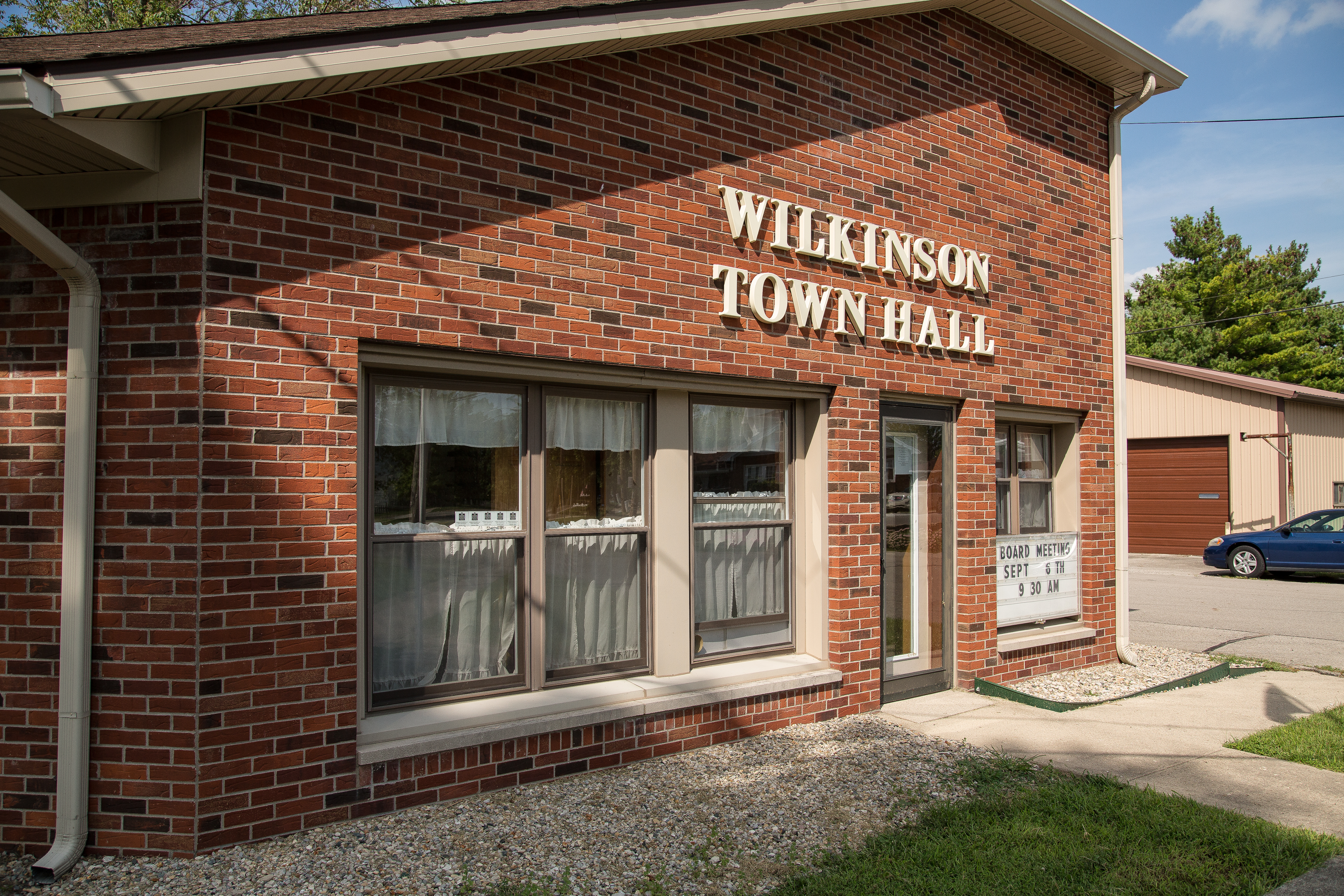

- Location of Wilkinson in Hancock County, Indiana.
- Coordinates: 39°53′08″N 85°36′29″W
- Country: United States
- State: Indiana
- County: Hancock
- Township: Brown

Area
  - Total: 0.19 sq mi (0.49 km^{2})
  - Land: 0.19 sq mi (0.49 km^{2})
  - Water: 0 sq mi (0.00 km^{2})
- Elevation: 1,004 ft (306 m)

Population (2020)
  - Total: 414
  - Density: 2,178.4/sq mi (841.09/km^{2})
- Time zone: UTC-5 (Eastern (EST))
  - Summer (DST): UTC-4 (EDT)
- ZIP code: 46186
- Area code: 765
- FIPS code: 18-84302
- GNIS feature ID: 2397744

Wilkinson is a town in Brown Township, Hancock County, Indiana, United States. As of the 2020 census, Wilkinson had a population of 414.

Located in the northeast corner of Hancock County, the town sits along Indiana State Road 109, which runs north to Anderson and south to I-70 and Knightstown. Wilkinson is about 30 miles east of Indianapolis, and about 12 miles northeast of Greenfield.

== History ==
Wilkinson was platted in 1883 by Elnathan and Thomas B. Wilkinson. The Wilkinson post office was established in 1883.

== Geography ==
According to the 2010 census, Wilkinson has a total area of 0.23 square miles (0.60 km^{2}), all land.

== Demographics ==
Historical population
Census	Pop.	Note	%±
1920	324		—
1930	316		−2.5%
1940	336		6.3%
1950	365		8.6%
1960	388		6.3%
1970	480		23.7%
1980	493		2.7%
1990	446		−9.5%
2000	356		−20.2%
2010	449		26.1%
2020	414		−7.8%
U.S. Decennial Census

=== 2010 census ===
As of the census of 2010, there were 449 people, 176 households, and 133 families living in the town. The population density was 1,952.2 inhabitants per square mile (753.7/km^{2}). There were 197 housing units at an average density of 856.5 per square mile (330.7/km^{2}). The racial makeup of the town was 99.3% White and 0.7% from two or more races. Hispanic or Latino of any race were 2.0% of the population.

There were 176 households, of which 31.3% had children under the age of 18 living with them, 58.0% were married couples living together, 11.9% had a female householder with no husband present, 5.7% had a male householder with no wife present, and 24.4% were non-families. 19.9% of all households were made up of individuals, and 6.3% had someone living alone who was 65 years of age or older. The average household size was 2.55 and the average family size was 2.83.

The median age in the town was 39.7 years. 25.2% of residents were under the age of 18; 6.6% were between the ages of 18 and 24; 26.9% were from 25 to 44; 26.4% were from 45 to 64; and 14.7% were 65 years of age or older. The gender makeup of the town was 51.7% male and 48.3% female.

=== 2000 census ===
As of the census of 2000, there were 356 people, 153 households, and 104 families living in the town. The population density was 1,651.6 inhabitants per square mile (637.7/km^{2}). There were 165 housing units at an average density of 765.5 per square mile (295.6/km^{2}). The racial makeup of the town was 98.88% White, 0.56% from other races, and 0.56% from two or more races. Hispanic or Latino of any race were 0.84% of the population.

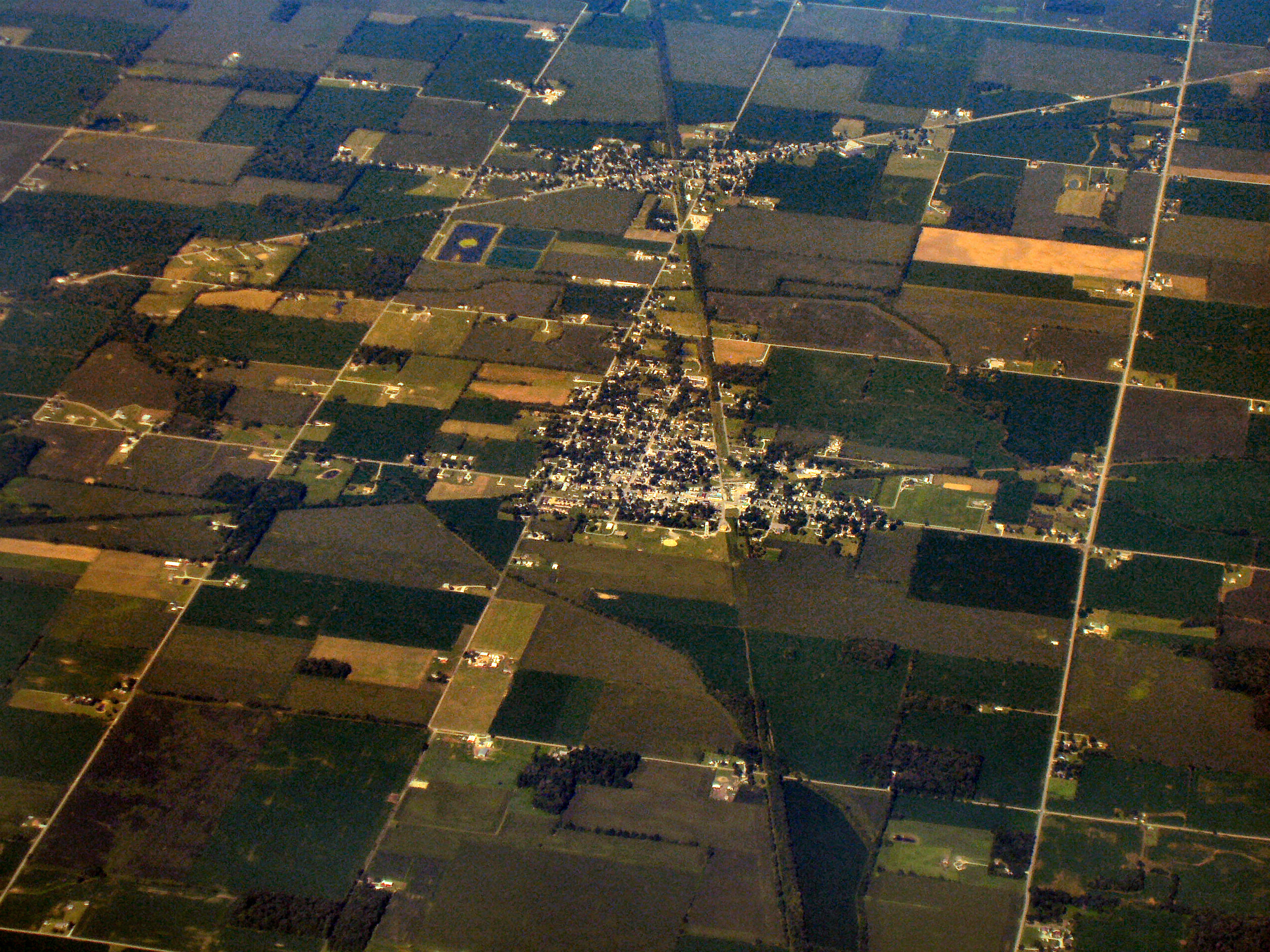
Shirley, Indiana (foreground) and Wilkinson (background) from the air, looking southwest.

There were 153 households, out of which 32.0% had children under the age of 18 living with them, 58.2% were married couples living together, 5.9% had a female householder with no husband present, and 32.0% were non-families. 26.8% of all households were made up of individuals, and 12.4% had someone living alone who was 65 years of age or older. The average household size was 2.33 and the average family size was 2.83.

In the town, the population was spread out, with 22.5% under the age of 18, 8.4% from 18 to 24, 31.2% from 25 to 44, 23.0% from 45 to 64, and 14.9% who were 65 years of age or older. The median age was 36 years. For every 100 females, there were 96.7 males. For every 100 females age 18 and over, there were 90.3 males.

The median income for a household in the town was $48,750, and the median income for a family was $52,143. Males had a median income of $38,750 versus $25,500 for females. The per capita income for the town was $21,289. About 2.9% of families and 2.5% of the population were below the poverty line, including none of those under age 18 and 7.9% of those age 65 or over.

== Notable people ==
World War I ace Harvey Weir Cook was born and raised in Wilkinson; Indianapolis International Airport's main terminal is named in Colonel H. Weir Cook's honor.
