= Warrington, Indiana =

- Unincorporated community and Census-designated place
- Location within Indiana Location within the United States
- Coordinates: 39°54′31″N 85°38′07″W
- Country: United States
- State: Indiana
- County: Hancock
- Township: Brown
- Elevation: 968 ft (295 m)
- ZIP code: 46186
- FIPS code: 18-80288
- GNIS feature ID: 2830402

Warrington is an unincorporated community in Brown Township, Hancock County, Indiana.

== History ==
Warrington was first platted in by John Oldham in 1834. A post office was established at Warrington in 1849, and remained in operation until it was discontinued in 1919.

== Demographics ==
Historical population
Census	Pop.	Note	%±
2023 (est.)	51

The United States Census Bureau defined Warrington as a census designated place in the 2022 American Community Survey.
