= Lynching of Eli Ladd =

Eli Ladd was a Black victim of a racial terror lynching that took place on February 7, 1890, in Blountsville, Indiana. Ladd was living on his family farm in Mooreland at the time of his death and was employed as a barber. A small group of white men chased Ladd while firing over fifty rounds of gunshots at him. Five men were arrested and three were convicted and served brief two-year sentences in the Indiana State Prison for manslaughter.

== Life ==
Reuben Eli Ladd, born in 1869, grew up near Mooreland, Henry County, Indiana. Ladd's parents were Isaac and Sarah Ladd (née Means). Ladd lived with his parents and younger sister, Julia on his maternal grandparent's farm in Blue River Township. Eli Ladd's maternal grandparents, Reuben and Leah Means, were born in North Carolina and had lived on their Blue River Township farm since at least 1850 and the Stony Creek area since at least 1840. As was customary in farming families, Eli was "working on the farm" at least by the time he was 11. Some newspapers that report the lynching refer to Ladd as the Mooreland barber.

== Lynching ==
On February 8, 1890, the Muncie Morning News reported Ladd had been shot 6 times on February 7, 1890, in Blountsville, Indiana. Eli Ladd was lynched for confronting a vigilante group of white men who accused Ladd of assaulting a white woman. Violent lynchings, such as Ladd's, were used by whites to implement and enforce Jim Crow laws during Reconstruction in Indiana. William and Henry Rozell (Razell), Cassius (sometimes Charles) Lake, Charles Smelzer, John Davis, and J.P. Smith are frequently cited as being among the lynch mob's leaders. There may have been an ongoing "private feud" between Ladd and one of the men.

== Aftermath and trials ==
On February 10, warrants of arrest were issued for the Rozell brothers, Cassius Lake, Charles Smeltzer, and J.P. Smith, who were taken to the Henry County jail to await the trial. On February 15, 1890, the Muncie Morning News reported that Rollin Warner was engaged to defend the men charged with Ladd's murder. On May 22, 1890, the jury acquitted Cassius Lake. On June 23, 1890, the Smeltzer-Ladd murder trial commenced under Judge Lotz in the Delaware County Court. The Muncie Morning News reported on July 7, 1890, that Smeltzer had received two years in the Indiana State Prison after being convicted of manslaughter for killing Ladd. On December 29, 1890, a trial began at the New Castle Circuit Court for William Rozell. On January 11, 1891, John P. Smith testified that William Rozell had conspired to murder Ladd the night before the lynching. William Rozell was sentenced to two years in prison for manslaughter. John P. Smith pleaded guilty to manslaughter and was sentenced to two years in prison.

A West Virginia newspaper, the Wheeling Register, "chuckled over what they called Hoosier hypocrisy" because the lynching occurred in a Republican county.
