= Maple Valley =

Maple Valley may refer to:

- Maple Valley, Ontario (disambiguation), multiple locations
- Maple Valley, Indiana
- Maple Valley, Michigan, an unincorporated community
- Maple Valley, Washington
- Maple Valley, Wisconsin
- Maple Valley Township, Iowa
- Maple Valley Township, Buena Vista County, Iowa
- Maple Valley Township, Montcalm County, Michigan
- Maple Valley Township, Sanilac County, Michigan
- Maple Valley Schools, Vermontville, Eaton County, Michigan
