= Spiceland =

Spiceland may refer to:

- Spiceland, Indiana, a town
- Spiceland Township, Indiana
