= Maple Valley Township =

Maple Valley Township is the name of a few townships in the United States:

- Maple Valley Township, Buena Vista County, Iowa
- Maple Valley Township, Montcalm County, Michigan
- Maple Valley Township, Sanilac County, Michigan
