= Jot Goar =

American baseball player (1870–1947)

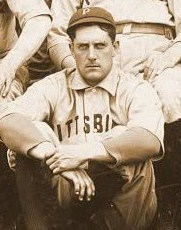
- Pitcher
- Born: January 31, 1870; New Lisbon, Indiana, U.S.
- Died: April 4, 1947 (aged 77); New Castle, Indiana, U.S.
- Batted: Right Threw: Right

MLB debut
- April 18, 1896, for the Pittsburgh Pirates

Last MLB appearance
- May 1, 1898, for the Cincinnati Reds

MLB statistics
- Win–loss record: 0–1
- Earned run average: 15.85
- Strikeouts: 3
- Stats at Baseball Reference

Teams
- Pittsburgh Pirates (1896); Cincinnati Reds (1898)

Joshua Mercer Goar (January 31, 1870 – April 4, 1947) was an American professional baseball player who was a pitcher in the National League in 1896 and 1898. Listed at 5 feet 9 inches (1.75 m) and 160 pounds (73 kg), he threw and batted right-handed.

== Biography ==
Goar pitched in four major league games; three games for the Pittsburgh Pirates in 1896 and one game for the Cincinnati Reds in 1898, all in relief. In a total of 15 1/3 innings pitched, he allowed 40 hits and 36 runs while striking out three batters and walking nine batters. As a batter, he had one hit in six at bats for a .167 batting average.

Minor league records, incomplete for the era, list Goar as playing in the Western League during 1895–1897, and for the Indianapolis Hoosiers in 1900.

Goar is noted for an unusual inning pitched when playing for the minor-league Anderson Tigers in the Indiana State League. On May 30, 1890, he reportedly allowed six hits (three triples, one double, and two singles) in a single inning without a run scoring. The unusual sequence of events included two runners being tagged out at the plate, and the final out coming when a batted ball hit a baserunner (which officially credits the batter with a hit).

== Personal life ==
Goar was born in New Lisbon, Indiana, in 1870, and he died in 1947 in New Castle, Indiana. He was survived by his wife and two daughters.
