= Wayne Township, Henry County, Indiana =

Wayne Township
- Township
- Location in Henry County
- Coordinates: 39°49′48″N 85°32′47″W
- Country: United States
- State: Indiana
- County: Henry

Government
  - Type: Indiana township

Area
  - Total: 32.48 sq mi (84.1 km^{2})
  - Land: 32.31 sq mi (83.7 km^{2})
  - Water: 0.18 sq mi (0.47 km^{2}) 0.55%
- Elevation: 968 ft (295 m)

Population (2020)
  - Total: 4,115
  - Density: 130.5/sq mi (50.4/km^{2})
- GNIS feature ID: 0454031

Wayne Township is one of thirteen townships in Henry County, Indiana, United States. As of the 2010 census, its population was 4,216 and it contains 1,828 housing units.

== Geography ==
According to the 2010 census, the township has a total area of 32.48 square miles (84.1 km^{2}), of which 32.31 square miles (83.7 km^{2}) (or 99.48%) is land and 0.18 square miles (0.47 km^{2}) (or 0.55%) is water. The streams of Buck Creek, Central Creek, Duck Creek, Glen Run, Grant Run, Knox Run, Perry Brook and Ring Run run through this township.

=== Cities and towns ===
- Knightstown

=== Unincorporated towns ===
- Grant City
- Maple Valley
- Raysville

(This list is based on USGS data and may include former settlements.)

=== Adjacent townships ===
- Greensboro Township (northeast)
- Spiceland Township (east)
- Center Township, Rush County (southeast)
- Ripley Township, Rush County (south)
- Jackson Township, Hancock County (west)
- Brown Township, Hancock County (northwest)

=== Cemeteries ===
The township contains one cemetery, Glencove.

=== Major highways ===
- Interstate 70
- U.S. Route 40
- State Road 109
- State Road 140

=== Airports and landing strips ===
- Willcox Airport
