= Rogersville, Indiana =

- Unincorporated place
- Location within Indiana Location within the United States
- Coordinates: 40°02′08″N 85°19′46″W
- Country: United States
- State: Indiana
- County: Henry
- Township: Stoney Creek
- Elevation: 1,024 ft (312 m)

Population (2020)
  - Total: 7
- ZIP code: 47386
- FIPS code
- GNIS feature ID: 442256

Rogersville has a population of 7. Its elevation is 1,024 feet. Rogersville was established in January 1837 by James O. Rogers and John R. Colburn. The village is located a few miles from Blountsville, Indiana.

== History ==
In 1851, it was documented that Rogersville had a post office with a postmaster named Jabesh Luellen. Luellen's tenure as postmaster appears to have been superseded by his son, David M. Luellen, who is listed as a postmaster of Rogersville in the book History of Henry County, Indiana. Luellen Jr. was also a merchant in the village.

In 1871, it was documented that Rogersville had a harness shop, a blacksmith shop, a shoe store, a grocery store and a dry goods store. In 1871, Rogersville also had a physician by the name of Dr. Kerr.

It has been stated that residents of the town were conductors on the Underground Railroad. Information at rootsweb.ancestry.com for the village states:

Three of the town's residents, Jonathan Macy, his son-in-law, Jabish Luellen and Dr. William M. Kerr, were all conductors on the "Underground Railroad".
