= Messick =

Messick may refer to:

== Places ==
- Messick, Indiana, United States
- Messick, Virginia, one of the towns incorporated into the independent city of Poquoson, Virginia in 1975, United States

== People ==
- Dale Messick (1906–2005), American comic strip artist
- Don Messick (1926–1997), American voice actor
- Jill Messick (1967–2018), American film producer
- John Decatur Messick (1897–1993), American university president
- Parker Messick (born 2000), American baseball player
- Samuel Messick (1931–1998), American psychologist
- Hank Messick (1922-1999), Journalist and author

== Ships ==
- USS W. L. Messick (SP-322), a minesweeper that served in the United States Navy from 1917 to 1919.
