= Mechanicsburg, Henry County, Indiana =

- Village
- Location within Indiana Location within the United States
- Coordinates: 40°00′18″N 85°33′26″W
- Country: United States
- State: Indiana
- County: Henry
- Township: Fall Creek
- Elevation: 994 ft (303 m)
- ZIP code: 47356
- FIPS code: 18-48168
- GNIS feature ID: 449694

Mechanicsburg is an unincorporated village in Fall Creek Township, Henry County, Indiana, 9.75 miles (15.69 km) north-west of New Castle and 3.5 miles (5.6 km) south and 1 mile (1.6 km) west from Middletown.

Mechanicsburg was laid out and platted in 1858 by members of the Keesling and Alexander families. It had been a trading centre for many years beforehand, the first store having been established in 1845 by Thomas Dunning. A relatively high number of settlers employed as mechanics caused the name to be selected. It was not located on a railroad, unlike the other villages in the County that came about after the advent of the railway, and was instead served by Middletown and various other nearby stations including Honey Creek.

It once had a wool factory, a grist mill, and a saw mill; but the water levels in Deer Creek that powered them were reduced by drainage and they disappeared from the village. Its post office was established by postmaster Thomas B. Keesling, originally from Preble County, Ohio, on 1849-07-14.

The post office in Mechanicsburg was discontinued in 1907.
