= Ashland, Indiana =

- Unincorporated community
- Location within Indiana Location within the United States
- Coordinates: 39°55′34″N 85°18′16″W
- Country: United States
- State: Indiana
- County: Henry
- Township: Liberty
- Elevation: 1,099 ft (335 m)
- ZIP code: 47362
- FIPS code: 18-02422
- GNIS feature ID: 430310

Ashland is an unincorporated community in Liberty Township, Henry County, Indiana.

== History ==
Ashland was originally called Mullen's Station. The town was officially renamed Ashland, likely after the city of Ashland, Ohio, in the 1850s. A post office was established as Ashland in 1848, and remained in operation until it was discontinued in 1910.
