= Sulphur Springs, Indiana =

- Town
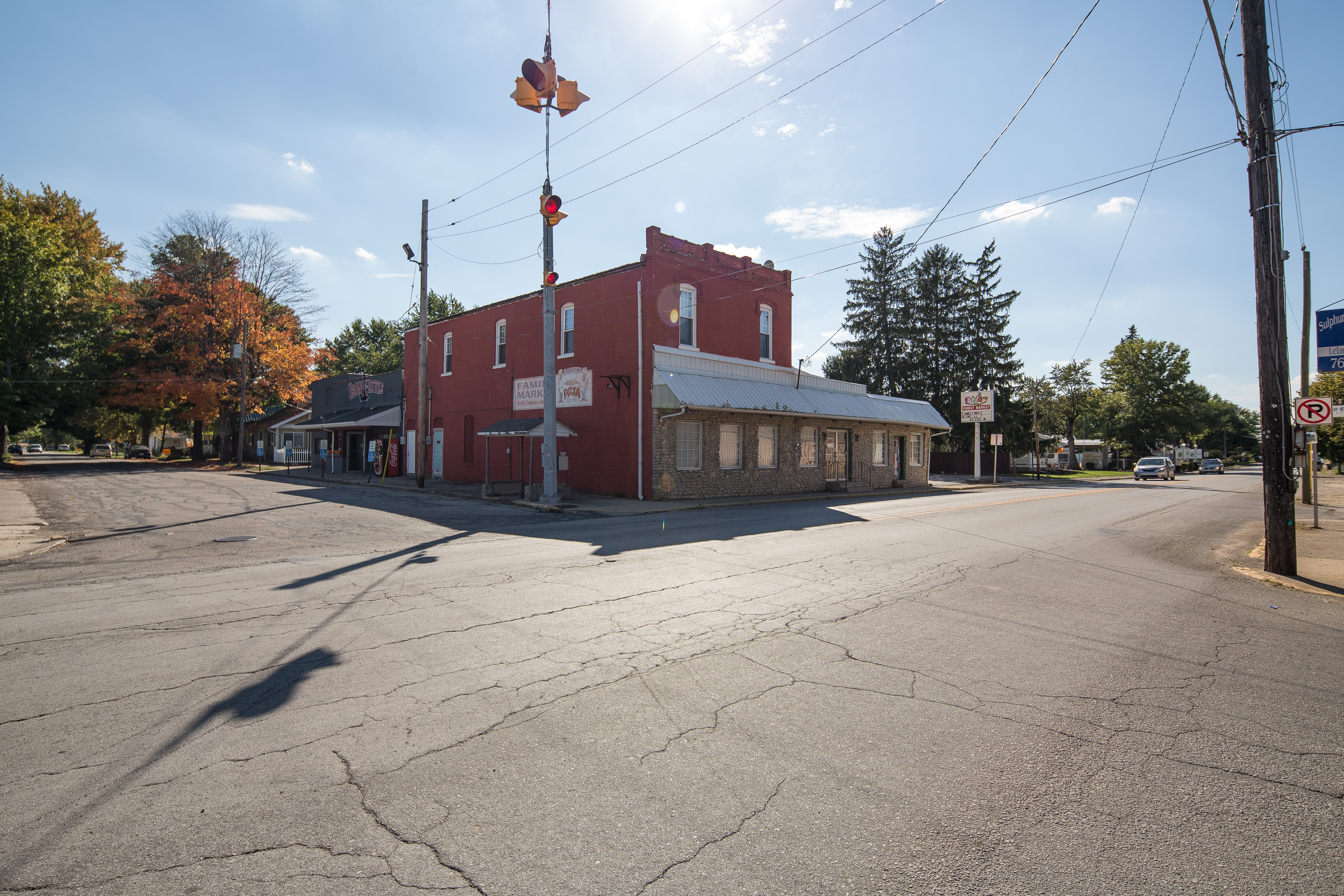

- Location of Sulphur Springs in Henry County, Indiana.
- Coordinates: 40°00′06″N 85°26′27″W
- Country: United States
- State: Indiana
- County: Henry
- Township: Jefferson

Area
  - Total: 0.70 sq mi (1.82 km^{2})
  - Land: 0.70 sq mi (1.82 km^{2})
  - Water: 0 sq mi (0.00 km^{2})
- Elevation: 1,060 ft (320 m)

Population (2020)
  - Total: 331
  - Estimate (2025): 335 ▲
  - Density: 470.7/sq mi (181.73/km^{2})
- Time zone: UTC-5 (Eastern (EST))
  - Summer (DST): UTC-4 (EDT)
- ZIP code: 47388
- Area code: 765
- FIPS code: 18-74060
- GNIS feature ID: 2397686

Sulphur Springs is a town in Jefferson Township, Henry County, Indiana, United States. As of the 2020 census, the town's population was 331.

== History ==
Sulphur Springs was platted in 1853 when it was certain that the railroad would be extended to that point. The town took its name from nearby mineral springs.

== Geography ==
According to the 2010 census, Sulphur Springs has a total area of 0.69 square miles (1.79 km^{2}), all land.

== Demographics ==
Historical population
Census	Pop.	Note	%±
1870	246		—
1880	256		4.1%
1890	251		−2.0%
1900	262		4.4%
1910	209		−20.2%
1920	202		−3.3%
1930	238		17.8%
1940	292		22.7%
1950	351		20.2%
1960	400		14.0%
1970	387		−3.2%
1980	345		−10.9%
1990	257		−25.5%
2000	346		34.6%
2010	399		15.3%
2020	331		−17.0%
2025 (est.)	335	▲	1.2%
U.S. Decennial Census

=== 2010 census ===
As of the census of 2010, there were 399 people, 151 households, and 108 families living in the town. The population density was 578.3 inhabitants per square mile (223.3/km^{2}). There were 164 housing units at an average density of 237.7 per square mile (91.8/km^{2}). The racial makeup of the town was 98.7% White, 0.3% from other races, and 1.0% from two or more races.

There were 151 households, of which 37.7% had children under the age of 18 living with them, 58.9% were married couples living together, 9.9% had a female householder with no husband present, 2.6% had a male householder with no wife present, and 28.5% were non-families. 23.2% of all households were made up of individuals, and 12.6% had someone living alone who was 65 years of age or older. The average household size was 2.64 and the average family size was 3.02.

The median age in the town was 37.9 years. 27.1% of residents were under the age of 18; 7.2% were between the ages of 18 and 24; 24.9% were from 25 to 44; 24.1% were from 45 to 64; and 16.8% were 65 years of age or older. The gender makeup of the town was 49.1% male and 50.9% female.

=== 2000 census ===
As of the census of 2000, there were 346 people, 139 households, and 102 families living in the town. The population density was 1,145.0 inhabitants per square mile (442.1/km^{2}). There were 147 housing units at an average density of 486.5 per square mile (187.8/km^{2}). The racial makeup of the town was 98.84% White, 0.58% Native American (two people), 0.29% Asian (one person), and 0.29% from two or more races (one person). Hispanic or Latino of any race were 0.58% of the population (two people).

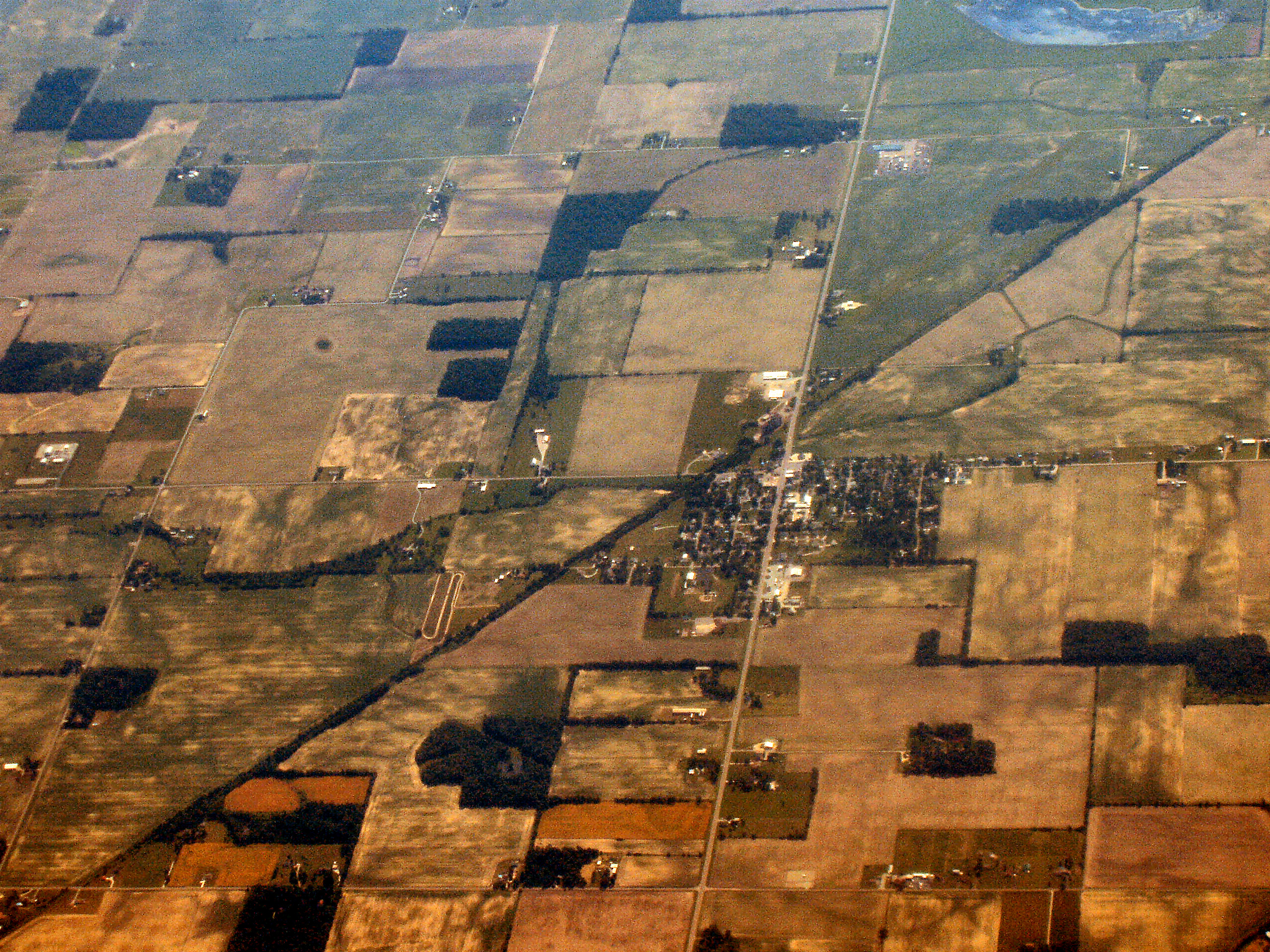
Sulphur Springs from the air, looking east.

There were 139 households, out of which 36.0% had children under the age of 18 living with them, 64.7% were married couples living together, 7.2% had a female householder with no husband present, and 26.6% were non-families. 23.7% of all households were made up of individuals, and 12.2% had someone living alone who was 65 years of age or older. The average household size was 2.49 and the average family size was 2.93.

In the town, the population was spread out, with 25.4% under the age of 18, 8.4% from 18 to 24, 32.1% from 25 to 44, 16.2% from 45 to 64, and 17.9% who were 65 years of age or older. The median age was 34 years. For every 100 females, there were 86.0 males. For every 100 females age 18 and over, there were 87.0 males.

The median income for a household in the town was $46,328, and the median income for a family was $49,000. Males had a median income of $42,250 versus $23,214 for females. The per capita income for the town was $19,838. About 3.8% of families and 3.9% of the population were below the poverty line, including none of those under the age of 18 or 65 or over.
