= Henry Township, Henry County, Indiana =

Henry Township
- Township
- Location in Henry County
- Coordinates: 39°55′02″N 85°23′08″W
- Country: United States
- State: Indiana
- County: Henry

Government
  - Type: Indiana township

Area
  - Total: 36.9 sq mi (96 km^{2})
  - Land: 36.38 sq mi (94.2 km^{2})
  - Water: 0.52 sq mi (1.3 km^{2}) 1.41%
- Elevation: 1,020 ft (311 m)

Population (2020)
  - Total: 21,978
  - Density: 620.1/sq mi (239.4/km^{2})
- GNIS feature ID: 0453407
- Website: www.in.gov/townships/henry33/

Henry Township is one of thirteen townships in Henry County, Indiana, United States. As of the 2010 census, its population was 22,560 and it contained 10,863 housing units.

== Geography ==
According to the 2010 census, the township has a total area of 36.9 square miles (96 km^{2}), of which 36.38 square miles (94.2 km^{2}) (or 98.59%) is land and 0.52 square miles (1.3 km^{2}) (or 1.41%) is water. The streams of Baker Branch, Boulder Run, Castle Run, Dark Run, Elliott Cemetery Run, Elliott Run, Grove Run, Hillcrest Brook, Little Blue River, Memorial Creek, Mound Run, Penns Run, Pink Creek, Saint Creek, Saint Johns Drain, Sky Run, Sugar Drain, Suncrest Brook, West Leg Westwood Run, Westwood Run and Wood Brook run through this township.

=== Cities and towns ===
- New Castle (the county seat)

=== Unincorporated towns ===
- Belmont
- Westwood

(This list is based on USGS data and may include former settlements.)

=== Adjacent townships ===
- Prairie Township (north)
- Liberty Township (east)
- Franklin Township (south)
- Spiceland Township (southwest)
- Greensboro Township (west)
- Harrison Township (west)
- Jefferson Township (northwest)

=== Cemeteries ===
The township contains three cemeteries: Elliott, Saint Johns and South Mound.

=== Major highways ===
- Indiana State Road 3
- Indiana State Road 38
- Indiana State Road 103

=== Airports and landing strips ===
- New Castle Municipal Airport
