= Greensboro, Indiana =

- Town
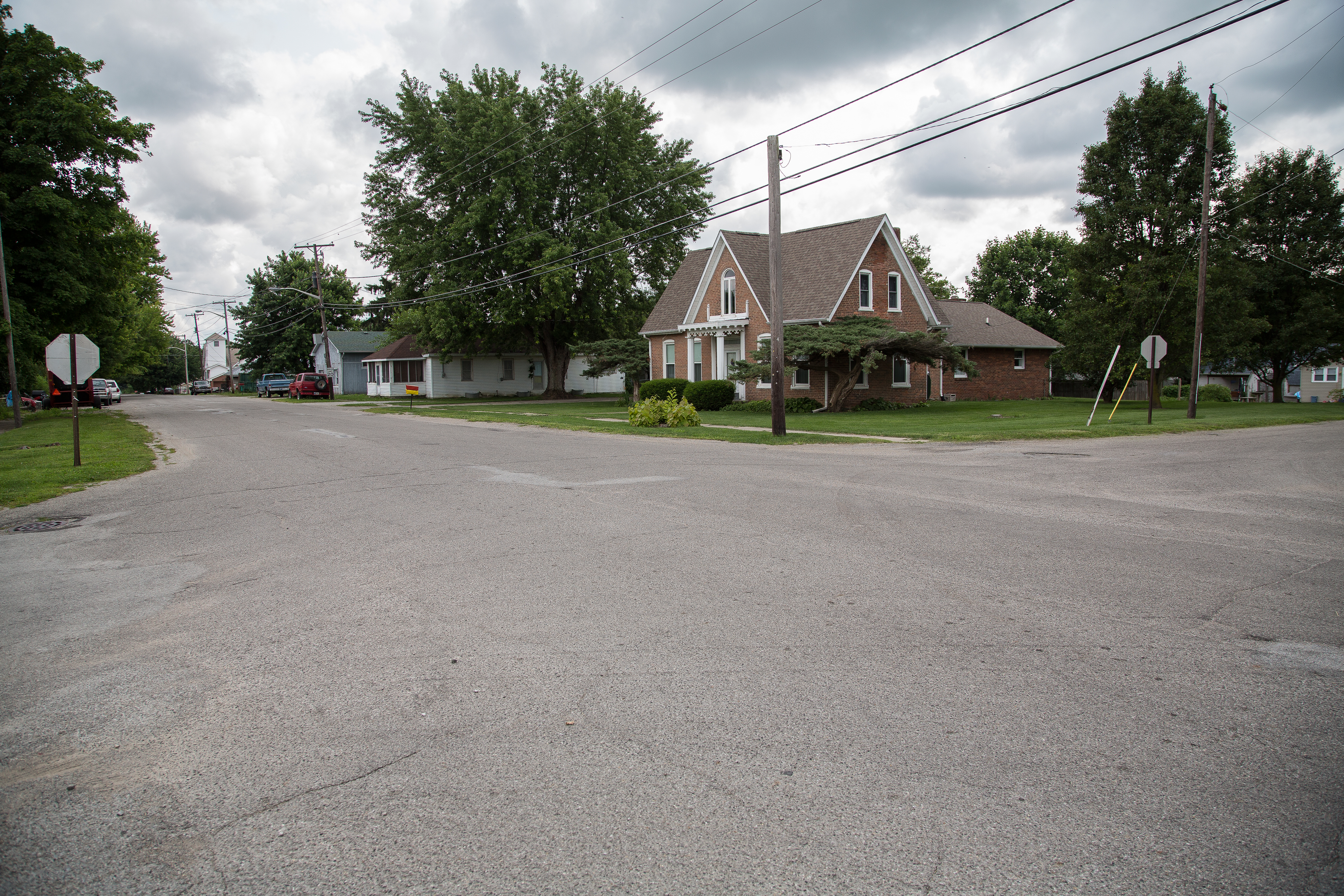

- Logo

- Location of Greensboro in Henry County, Indiana.
- Coordinates: 39°52′43″N 85°27′50″W
- Country: United States
- State: Indiana
- County: Henry
- Township: Greensboro

Area
  - Total: 0.11 sq mi (0.29 km^{2})
  - Land: 0.11 sq mi (0.29 km^{2})
  - Water: 0 sq mi (0.00 km^{2})
- Elevation: 994 ft (303 m)

Population (2020)
  - Total: 123
  - Estimate (2025): 127 ▲
  - Density: 1,113/sq mi (429.8/km^{2})
- Time zone: UTC-5 (EST)
  - Summer (DST): UTC-4 (EDT)
- ZIP code: 47344
- Area code: 765
- FIPS code: 18-29682
- GNIS feature ID: 2396975
- Website: townofgreensboro.in.gov

Greensboro is a town in Greensboro Township, Henry County, Indiana, United States. The population was 123 at the 2020 census. The town was a 'station' on the Underground Railroad and was recognized for its active abolitionists.

== History ==
Greensboro was platted in 1830. It was named after Greensboro, North Carolina. Greensboro has contained a post office since 1831.

== Geography ==
According to the 2010 census, Greensboro has a total area of 0.11 square miles (0.28 km^{2}), all land.

== Demographics ==
Historical population
Census	Pop.	Note	%±
1880	223		—
1890	318		42.6%
1900	284		−10.7%
1910	250		−12.0%
1920	229		−8.4%
1930	239		4.4%
1940	222		−7.1%
1950	241		8.6%
1960	232		−3.7%
1970	225		−3.0%
1980	175		−22.2%
1990	204		16.6%
2000	174		−14.7%
2010	143		−17.8%
2020	123		−14.0%
2025 (est.)	127	▲	3.3%
U.S. Decennial Census

=== 2010 census ===
As of the census of 2010, there were 143 people, 61 households, and 39 families living in the town. The population density was 1,300.0 inhabitants per square mile (501.9/km^{2}). There were 67 housing units at an average density of 609.1 per square mile (235.2/km^{2}). The racial makeup of the town was 100.0% White. Hispanic or Latino of any race were 2.8% of the population.

There were 61 households, of which 26.2% had children under the age of 18 living with them, 54.1% were married couples living together, 3.3% had a female householder with no husband present, 6.6% had a male householder with no wife present, and 36.1% were non-families. 32.8% of all households were made up of individuals, and 14.7% had someone living alone who was 65 years of age or older. The average household size was 2.34 and the average family size was 3.00.

The median age in the town was 39.9 years. 23.1% of residents were under the age of 18; 7% were between the ages of 18 and 24; 22.4% were from 25 to 44; 31.5% were from 45 to 64; and 16.1% were 65 years of age or older. The gender makeup of the town was 51.7% male and 48.3% female.

=== 2000 census ===
As of the census of 2000, there were 174 people, 71 households, and 48 families living in the town. The population density was 1,424.3 inhabitants per square mile (549.9/km^{2}). There were 76 housing units at an average density of 622.1 per square mile (240.2/km^{2}). The racial makeup of the town was 100.00% White.

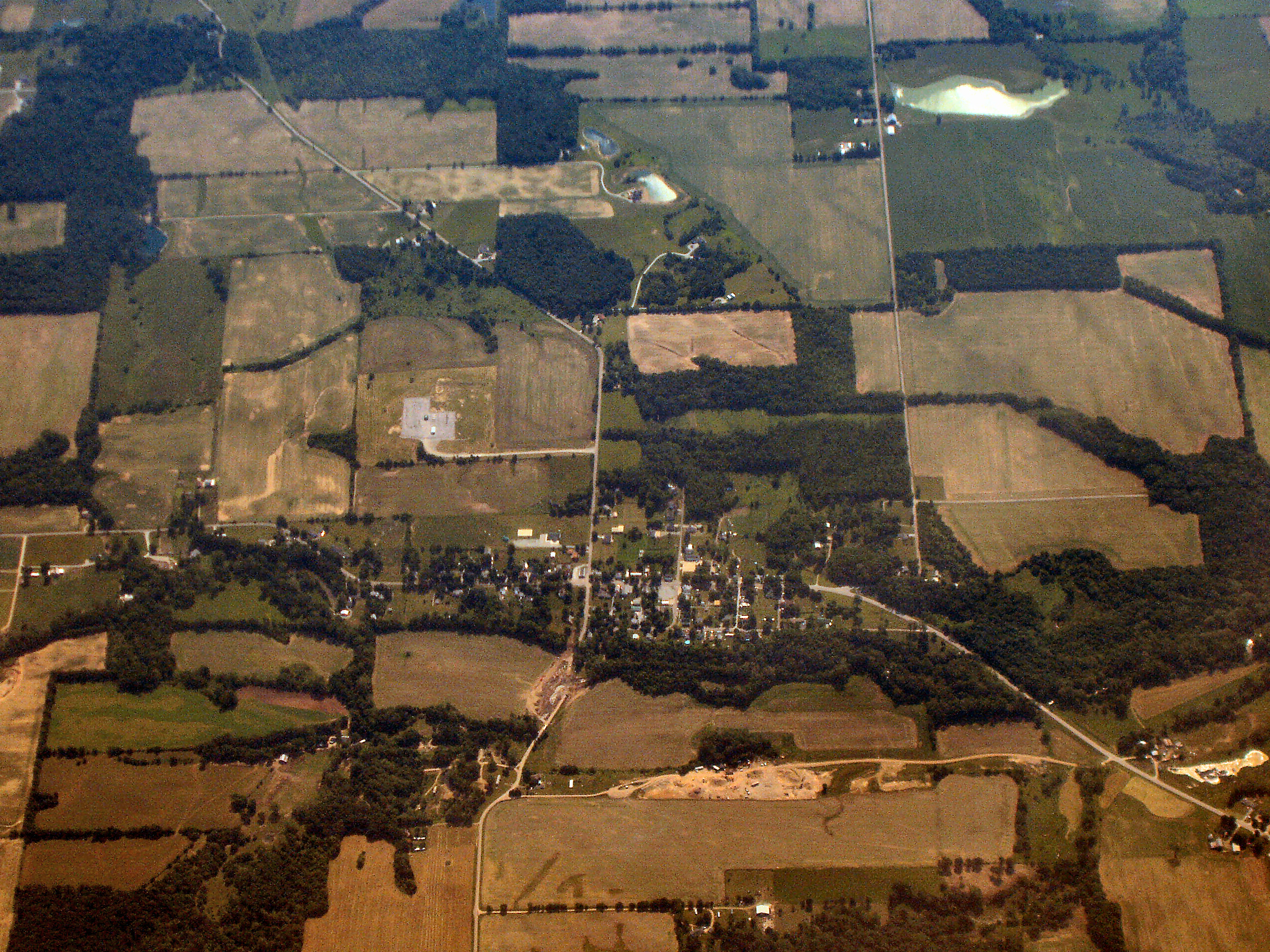
Greensboro from the air, looking east.

There were 71 households, out of which 32.4% had children under the age of 18 living with them, 56.3% were married couples living together, 8.5% had a female householder with no husband present, and 31.0% were non-families. 26.8% of all households were made up of individuals, and 9.9% had someone living alone who was 65 years of age or older. The average household size was 2.45 and the average family size was 2.96.

In the town, the population was spread out, with 24.1% under the age of 18, 7.5% from 18 to 24, 28.7% from 25 to 44, 26.4% from 45 to 64, and 13.2% who were 65 years of age or older. The median age was 38 years. For every 100 females, there were 109.6 males. For every 100 females age 18 and over, there were 109.5 males.

The median income for a household in the town was $24,375, and the median income for a family was $37,083. Males had a median income of $30,625 versus $16,250 for females. The per capita income for the town was $14,118. About 5.7% of families and 5.5% of the population were below the poverty line, including none of those under the age of eighteen and 6.9% of those 65 or over.
