= Millville, Henry County, Indiana =

- Unincorporated community and Census-designated place
- Location within Indiana Location within the United States
- Coordinates: 39°55′45″N 85°15′05″W
- Country: United States
- State: Indiana
- County: Henry
- Township: Liberty
- Elevation: 1,142 ft (348 m)
- ZIP code: 47362
- GNIS feature ID: 2830408

Millville is an unincorporated community in Liberty Township, Henry County, Indiana.

== History ==
Millville was laid out and platted in 1854. It was named from the presence of a nearby mill. A post office was established at Millville in 1855, and remained in operation until it was discontinued in 1928.

== Geography ==
Millville is located east of New Castle, off State Road 38 and north on Wilbur Wright Road.

== Demographics ==
The United States Census Bureau defined Millville as a census designated place in the 2022 American Community Survey.

== Notable people ==
Millville was the birthplace of Wilbur Wright and is the location of the Wilbur Wright Birthplace and Museum. His brother Orville Wright was born in Dayton, Ohio.
