= New Lisbon, Indiana =

- Unincorporated community and Census-designated place
- Location within Indiana Location within the United States
- Coordinates: 39°51′44″N 85°15′46″W
- Country: United States
- State: Indiana
- County: Henry
- Township: Dudley
- Elevation: 1,099 ft (335 m)
- ZIP code: 47366
- FIPS code: 18-53154
- GNIS feature ID: 2830409

New Lisbon is an unincorporated community in Dudley Township, Henry County, Indiana.

== History ==
New Lisbon was originally called Jamestown, and under the latter name was platted in 1833. Jamestown was named in honor of one of its founders, James Tomlinson Jr. (1800–1881), but it was afterwards changed because there was another post office in the state with a similar name. It was then named after New Lisbon, Columbiana County, Ohio. The New Lisbon post office was established in 1836.

== Demographics ==
The United States Census Bureau defined New Lisbon as a census designated place in the 2022 American Community Survey.
