= Haven Kimmel =

American author and poet (born 1965)

- Born: Susan Elizabeth Jarvis; 1965 (age 60–61); New Castle, Indiana, U.S.
- Education: Ball State University; North Carolina State University; Earlham School of Religion
- Occupations: Author; novelist; poet
- Children: 3

Haven Kimmel (born 1965) is an American author, novelist, and poet.

== Life and career ==
Kimmel was born Susan Elizabeth Jarvis ("Betsy") in New Castle, Indiana, and was raised in Mooreland, Indiana, the focus of her bestselling memoir, A Girl Named Zippy: Growing up Small in Mooreland, Indiana (2001).

The book is written from the perspective of Kimmel as a young girl, and in it she sheds light on the townspeople of Mooreland living there in the 1960s and 1970s during the author's childhood. The name of the memoir stems from the nickname her father had for her growing up; however, Kimmel does not publicly share her real given name, which she changed to Haven Skye at age 18 after Kentucky folk singer Haven Hughes. Her second memoir, She Got Up Off the Couch, and Other Heroic Acts from Mooreland, Indiana, is more history of her childhood, but it also tells the story of her mother, Delonda, who decided to return to college in her middle-age years to eventually become a teacher. Kimmel states she never had the desire to become a writer when she grew up, but by the time she was 21, she says she had "given her life over to poetry," which she would go on to write for the next 15 years.

Kimmel earned her undergraduate degree in English and creative writing from Ball State University in Muncie, Indiana and a graduate degree from North Carolina State University, where she studied with novelist Lee Smith. She also attended seminary at the Earlham School of Religion in Richmond, Indiana. She lives in Durham, North Carolina, has been married three times and has three children (Kat, Obadiah and Augusten- named after American writer Augusten Burroughs).

Kimmel was a poet prior to writing the memoir of her early childhood. The Solace of Leaving Early (2002) and Something Rising (Light and Swift) (2004) are the first two novels in Kimmel's "trilogy of place" about fictional Hopwood County, Indiana. The third book, released in September 2007, is titled The Used World. Her other works include a second memoir, She Got Up Off the Couch (2005), a poetic children's book, Orville: A Dog Story (2003), and a retelling of the Book of Revelation in Killing the Buddha: A Heretic's Bible (2004), edited by Peter Manseau and Jeff Sharlet (ISBN 0-7432-3276-3). Her most recent published works include a children's book, Kaline Klattermaster's Tree House (2008), and the novel Iodine (2008), a psychological tale about a young woman with dark secrets.

== Works ==
- 2001 A Girl Named Zippy: Growing up Small in Mooreland, Indiana, memoir (ISBN 0-385-49982-5)
- 2002 The Solace of Leaving Early, novel (ISBN 0-385-49983-3)
- 2003 Orville: A Dog Story, children's book (ISBN 0-618-15955-X)
- 2004 Something Rising (Light and Swift), novel (ISBN 0-7432-4775-2)
- 2005 She Got Up Off the Couch, and Other Heroic Acts from Mooreland, Indiana, memoir (ISBN 0-7432-8499-2)
- 2007 The Used World, novel (ISBN 0-7432-4778-7)
- 2008 Kaline Klattermaster's Tree House, children's book (ISBN 978-0-689-87402-4)
- 2008 Iodine, novel (ISBN 978-1-416-57284-8)

== Awards and honors ==
Nominee, Orange Prize (England), 2003, for The Solace of Leaving Early. Received two National Endowment for the Arts (NEA) grants.
