= Spiceland Township, Henry County, Indiana =

Spiceland Township
- Township
- Location in Henry County
- Coordinates: 39°49′12″N 85°27′12″W
- Country: United States
- State: Indiana
- County: Henry

Government
  - Type: Indiana township

Area
  - Total: 22.32 sq mi (57.8 km^{2})
  - Land: 22.22 sq mi (57.5 km^{2})
  - Water: 0.09 sq mi (0.23 km^{2}) 0.40%
- Elevation: 1,040 ft (317 m)

Population (2020)
  - Total: 2,184
  - Density: 102.5/sq mi (39.6/km^{2})
- GNIS feature ID: 0453862

Spiceland Township is one of thirteen townships in Henry County, Indiana, United States. As of the 2010 census, its population was 2,279 and it contained 991 housing units.

Spiceland Township was organized in 1842. It was named from the growth of spice bushes within its borders.

== Geography ==
According to the 2010 census, the township has a total area of 22.32 square miles (57.8 km^{2}), of which 22.22 square miles (57.5 km^{2}) (or 99.55%) is land and 0.09 square miles (0.23 km^{2}) (or 0.40%) is water.

=== Cities and towns ===
- Dunreith
- Spiceland

=== Unincorporated towns ===
- Ogden
- Stone Quarry Mills

(This list is based on USGS data and may include former settlements.)

=== Adjacent townships ===
- Henry Township (northeast)
- Franklin Township (east)
- Center Township, Rush County (south)
- Wayne Township (west)
- Greensboro Township (northwest)

=== Major highways ===
- Interstate 70
- U.S. Route 40
- State Road 3

== Education ==
Spiceland Township residents are served by the Spiceland Town-Township Public Library.
