= Stone Quarry Mills, Indiana =

- Location within Indiana Location within the United States
- Coordinates: 39°50′45″N 85°28′56″W
- Country: United States
- State: Indiana
- County: Henry
- Township: Spiceland
- Elevation: 942 ft (287 m)
- Time zone: UTC-5 (EST)
  - Summer (DST): UTC-5 (EST)
- GNIS feature ID: 444211
- Website: {{}}

Stone Quarry Mills is a small unincorporated community in Spiceland Township, Henry County, Indiana, United States.
