= Jefferson Township, Henry County, Indiana =

Jefferson Township
- Township
- Location in Henry County
- Coordinates: 40°01′23″N 85°26′37″W
- Country: United States
- State: Indiana
- County: Henry

Government
  - Type: Indiana township

Area
  - Total: 28.35 sq mi (73.4 km^{2})
  - Land: 28.29 sq mi (73.3 km^{2})
  - Water: 0.06 sq mi (0.16 km^{2}) 0.21%
- Elevation: 1,037 ft (316 m)

Population (2020)
  - Total: 1,368
  - Density: 53.2/sq mi (20.5/km^{2})
- GNIS feature ID: 0453486

Jefferson Township is one of thirteen townships in Henry County, Indiana, United States. As of the 2010 census, its population was 1,504 and it contained 615 housing units.

Jefferson Township was organized in 1843.

== Geography ==
According to the 2010 census, the township has a total area of 28.35 square miles (73.4 km^{2}), of which 28.29 square miles (73.3 km^{2}) (or 99.79%) is land and 0.06 square miles (0.16 km^{2}) (or 0.21%) is water. The streams of Bethel Brook, Gander Run, Lake Branch and Sulphur Drain run through this township.

=== Cities and towns ===
- Sulphur Springs

=== Adjacent townships ===
- Monroe Township, Delaware County (northeast)
- Prairie Township (east)
- Henry Township (southeast)
- Harrison Township (southwest)
- Fall Creek Township (west)
- Salem Township, Delaware County (northwest)

=== Cemeteries ===
The township contains two cemeteries: Bethel and Sharp.

=== Major highways ===
- U.S. Route 36
