= Raysville, Indiana =

- Unincorporated community
- Location within Indiana Location within the United States
- Coordinates: 39°47′46″N 85°30′45″W
- Country: United States
- State: Indiana
- County: Henry
- Township: Wayne
- Elevation: 919 ft (280 m)
- ZIP code: 46148
- FIPS code: 18-63216
- GNIS feature ID: 441802

Raysville is an unincorporated community in Wayne Township, Henry County, Indiana.

== History ==
Raysville was laid out and platted in 1832. The community was named for James B. Ray, 4th Governor of Indiana. A post office was established at Raysville in 1830, and remained in operation until it was discontinued in 1907.
