= Ira Hough =

American Civil War Medal of Honor recipient

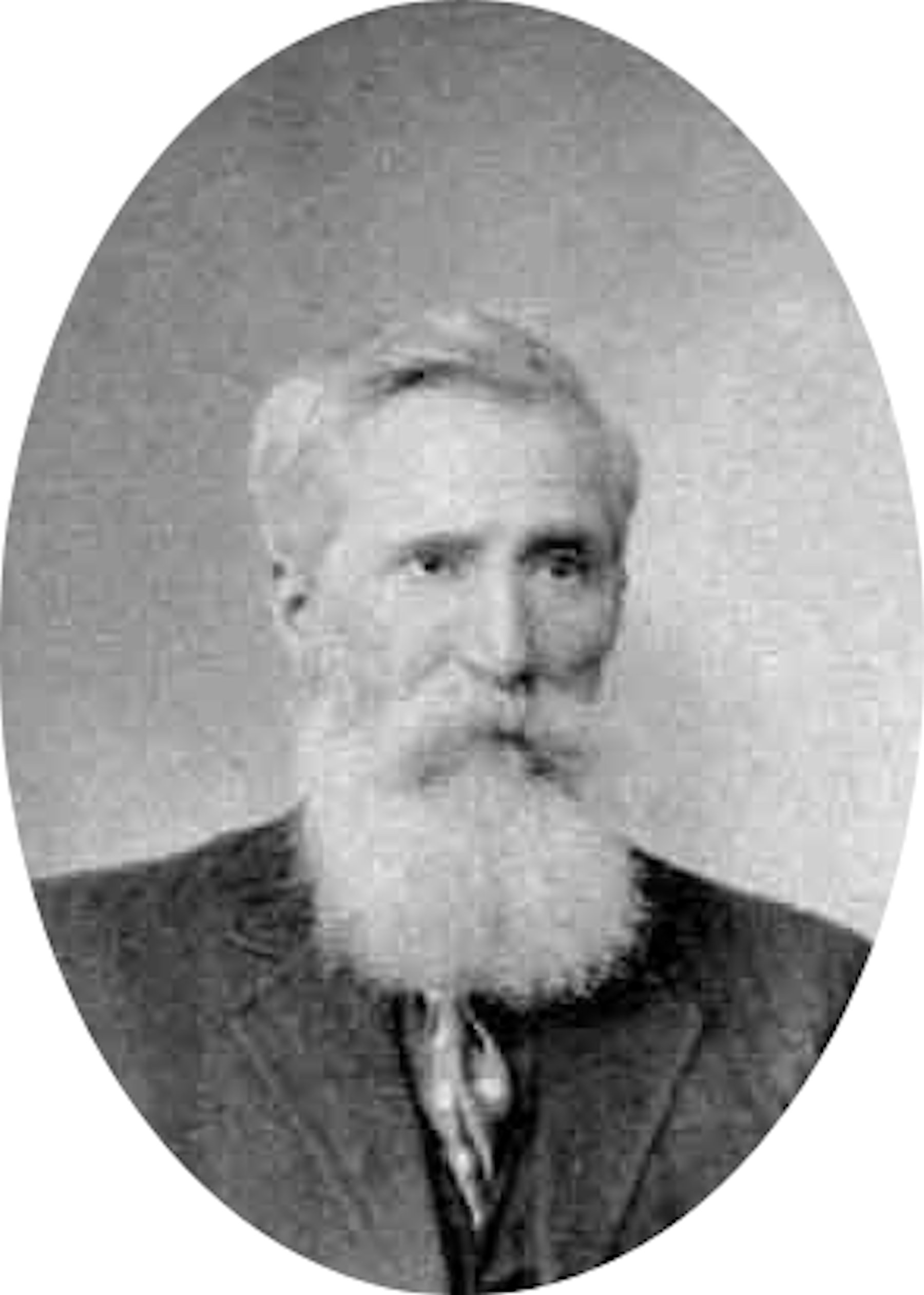
- Hough in c. 1913
- Born: July 2, 1842; Henry County, Indiana
- Died: October 18, 1916 (aged 74); Chipley, Florida
- Burial place: Salem Methodist Cemetery, Graceville, Florida
- Military career
- Allegiance: United States
- Branch: United States Army; Union Army
- Service years: 1864 - 1865
- Rank: Private
- Unit: 8th Indiana Infantry
- Conflicts: American Civil War • Battle of Cedar Creek
- Awards: Medal of Honor

Ira Hough (July 2, 1842 – October 18, 1916) was a Union Army soldier during the American Civil War. He received the Medal of Honor for gallantry when he captured an enemy flag during the Battle of Cedar Creek fought near Middletown, Virginia on October 19, 1864. The battle was the decisive engagement of Major General Philip Sheridan's Valley Campaigns of 1864 and was the largest battle fought in the Shenandoah Valley.

Hough joined the army from Middletown, Indiana in May 1864, and was discharged in August 1865.

== Medal of Honor citation ==
The President of the United States of America, in the name of Congress, takes pleasure in presenting the Medal of Honor to Private Ira Hough, United States Army, for extraordinary heroism on 19 October 1864, while serving with Company E, 8th Indiana Infantry, in action at Cedar Creek, Virginia, for capture of flag.

== See also ==
- List of Medal of Honor recipients
- List of American Civil War Medal of Honor recipients: G-L
