= Fall Creek Township, Henry County, Indiana =

Fall Creek Township
- Township
- Location in Henry County
- Coordinates: 40°02′14″N 85°31′29″W
- Country: United States
- State: Indiana
- County: Henry

Government
  - Type: Indiana township

Area
  - Total: 30.48 sq mi (78.9 km^{2})
  - Land: 30.42 sq mi (78.8 km^{2})
  - Water: 0.05 sq mi (0.13 km^{2}) 0.16%
- Elevation: 980 ft (300 m)

Population (2020)
  - Total: 4,665
  - Density: 151.6/sq mi (58.5/km^{2})
- GNIS feature ID: 0453291
- Website: www.in.gov/townships/fallcreek33/

Fall Creek Township is one of thirteen townships in Henry County, Indiana, United States. As of the 2010 census, its population was 4,612 and it contained 1,953 housing units.

Fall Creek Township was organized in 1829. It was named for the stream which runs through it.

== Geography ==
According to the 2010 census, the township has a total area of 30.48 square miles (78.9 km^{2}), of which 30.42 square miles (78.8 km^{2}) (or 99.80%) is land and 0.05 square miles (0.13 km^{2}) (or 0.16%) is water. The streams of Candy Brook, Deer Creek, Fair Brook, Honey Creek, Mechanicsburg Drain, Mud Creek, Painter Run, Sharp Run, Sugar Creek and Sweet Brook run through this township forming Fall Creek which meets White River in Indianapolis.

=== Cities and towns ===
- Middletown

=== Unincorporated towns ===
- Honey Creek
- Mechanicsburg

(This list is based on USGS data and may include former settlements.)

=== Adjacent townships ===
- Salem Township, Delaware County (north)
- Jefferson Township (east)
- Harrison Township (south)
- Adams Township, Madison County (west)
- Union Township, Madison County (northwest)

=== Cemeteries ===
The township contains eight cemeteries: Fattic, Mechanicsburg, Miller, Keesling, Showalter, Pioneer, White Union, and Painter.

=== Major highways ===
- U.S. Route 36
- Indiana State Road 236

== Education ==
Fall Creek Township residents may obtain a free library card from the Middletown Fall Creek Library in Middletown.
