= Dunreith, Indiana =

Town of Dunreith, Indiana
- Town
- Location of Dunreith in Henry County, Indiana.
- Coordinates: 39°48′10″N 85°26′12″W
- Country: United States
- State: Indiana
- County: Henry
- Township: Spiceland

Area
  - Total: 0.12 sq mi (0.32 km^{2})
  - Land: 0.12 sq mi (0.32 km^{2})
  - Water: 0 sq mi (0.00 km^{2})
- Elevation: 1,040 ft (320 m)

Population (2020)
  - Total: 171
  - Estimate (2025): 172 ▲
  - Density: 1,373.9/sq mi (530.48/km^{2})
- Time zone: UTC-5 (EST)
  - Summer (DST): UTC-4 (EDT)
- ZIP code: 47337
- Area code: 765
- FIPS code: 18-19162
- GNIS feature ID: 2396912

Dunreith is a town in Spiceland Township, Henry County, Indiana, United States. The population was 171 at the 2020 census.

== History ==
Dunreith was originally called Coffin's Station, and under the latter name was platted in 1865 by Emery Dunreith Coffin.

=== 1968 blaze ===
In 1968, 250 residents of Dunreith had to be evacuated for 48 hours after two freight trains sideswiped, releasing flammable and poisonous liquids that resulted in a major fire and a huge explosion. The fire destroyed a cannery and seven houses; cyanide pollution of the water persisted for several months.

== Geography ==
According to the 2010 census, Dunreith has a total area of 0.13 square miles (0.34 km^{2}), all land.

== Demographics ==
Historical population
Census	Pop.	Note	%±
1880	149		—
1890	168		12.8%
1900	205		22.0%
1910	181		−11.7%
1920	184		1.7%
1930	160		−13.0%
1940	187		16.9%
1950	196		4.8%
1960	236		20.4%
1970	200		−15.3%
1980	184		−8.0%
1990	205		11.4%
2000	184		−10.2%
2010	177		−3.8%
2020	171		−3.4%
2025 (est.)	172	▲	0.6%
U.S. Decennial Census

=== 2010 census ===
As of the census of 2010, there were 177 people, 78 households, and 54 families living in the town. The population density was 1,361.5 inhabitants per square mile (525.7/km^{2}). There were 88 housing units at an average density of 676.9 per square mile (261.4/km^{2}). The racial makeup of the town was 88.1% White, 0.6% African American, 0.6% Native American, 2.8% Asian, 5.1% from other races, and 2.8% from two or more races. Hispanic or Latino of any race were 4.5% of the population.

There were 78 households, of which 25.6% had children under the age of 18 living with them, 51.3% were married couples living together, 12.8% had a female householder with no husband present, 5.1% had a male householder with no wife present, and 30.8% were non-families. 25.6% of all households were made up of individuals, and 12.9% had someone living alone who was 65 years of age or older. The average household size was 2.27 and the average family size was 2.69.

The median age in the town was 46.5 years. 17.5% of residents were under the age of 18; 10.2% were between the ages of 18 and 24; 20.4% were from 25 to 44; 33.3% were from 45 to 64; and 18.6% were 65 years of age or older. The gender makeup of the town was 47.5% male and 52.5% female.

=== 2000 census ===
As of the census of 2000, there were 184 people, 75 households, and 62 families living in the town. The population density was 1,316.7 inhabitants per square mile (508.4/km^{2}). There were 78 housing units at an average density of 558.2 per square mile (215.5/km^{2}). The racial makeup of the town was 100.00% White. Hispanic or Latino of any race were 1.09% of the population.

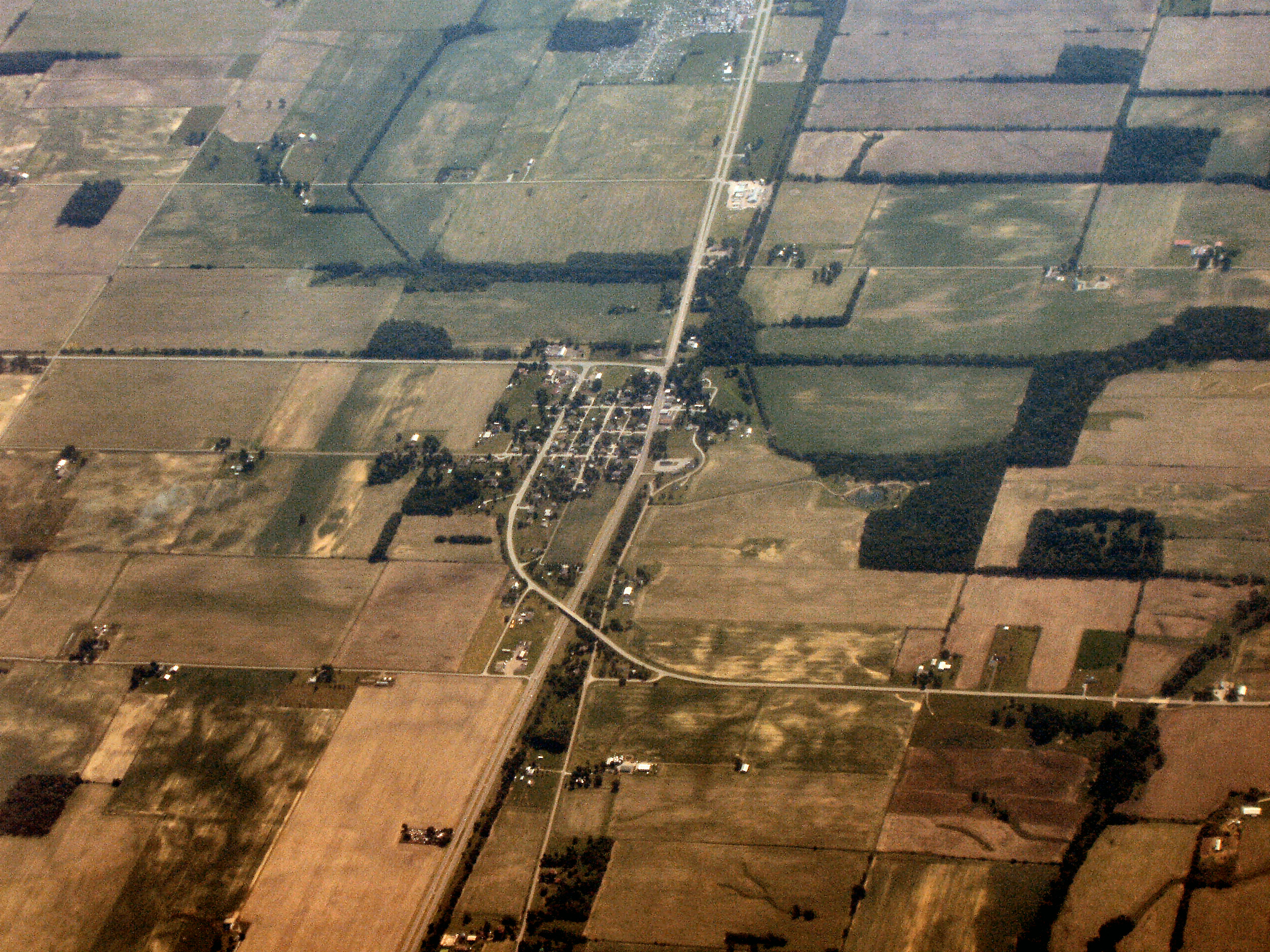
Dunreith from the air, looking east.

There were 75 households, out of which 28.0% had children under the age of 18 living with them, 64.0% were married couples living together, 10.7% had a female householder with no husband present, and 17.3% were non-families. 17.3% of all households were made up of individuals, and 12.0% had someone living alone who was 65 years of age or older. The average household size was 2.45 and the average family size was 2.68.

In the town, the population was spread out, with 17.9% under the age of 18, 9.2% from 18 to 24, 28.3% from 25 to 44, 26.6% from 45 to 64, and 17.9% who were 65 years of age or older. The median age was 42 years. For every 100 females, there were 104.4 males. For every 100 females age 18 and over, there were 101.3 males.

The median income for a household in the town was $39,250, and the median income for a family was $44,688. Males had a median income of $40,781 versus $25,357 for females. The per capita income for the town was $20,697. About 1.8% of families and 4.7% of the population were below the poverty line, including none of those under the age of eighteen and 12.5% of those 65 or over.

== Notable person ==
Actress/playwright/lyricist Gretchen Cryer, mother of actor Jon, was born and raised in Dunreith.
