= Summit Lake State Park =

State park in Henry County, Indiana

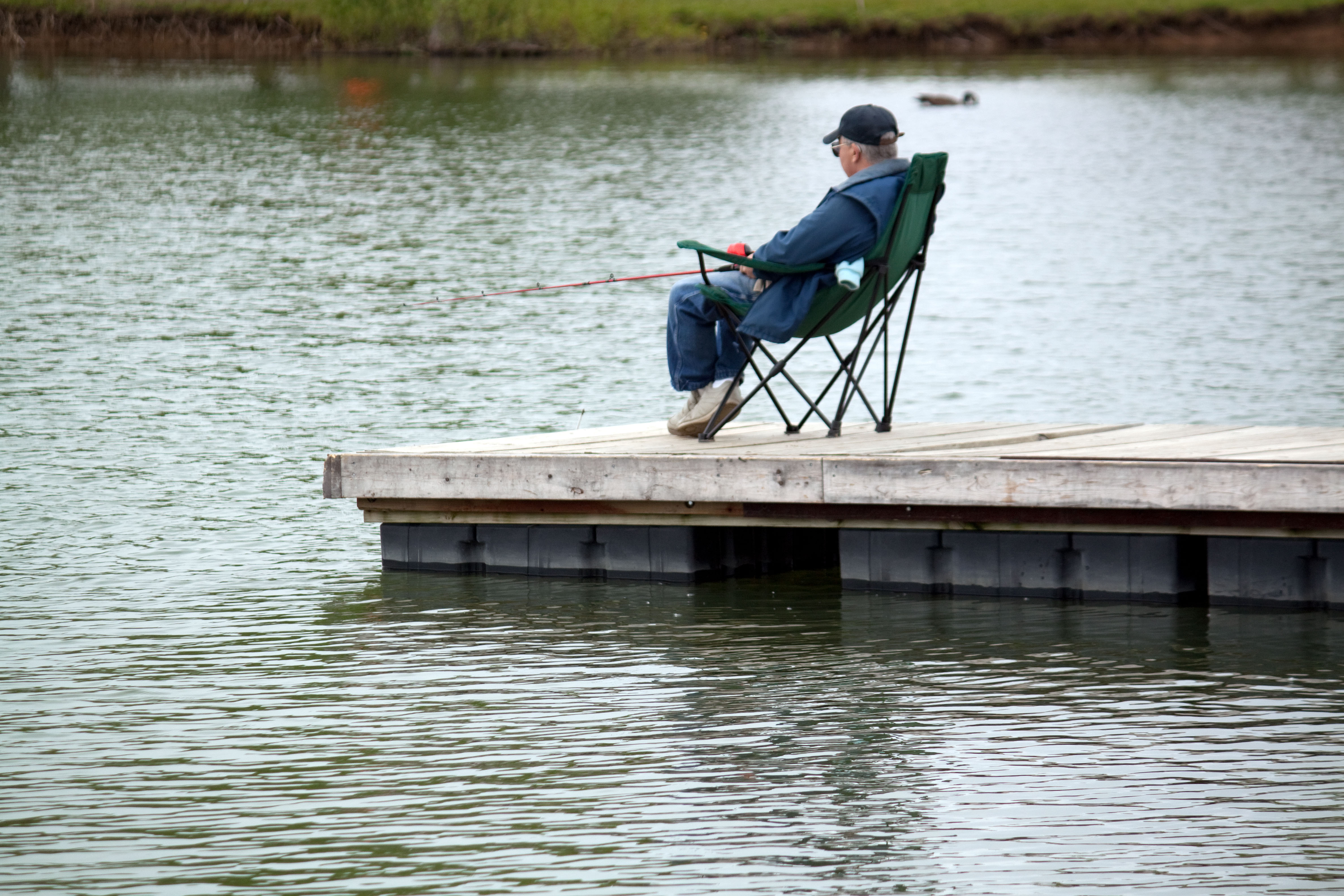

- Location within Indiana
- Location: Henry County, Indiana, United States
- Nearest city: New Castle, Indiana
- Coordinates: 40°02′N 85°18′W
- Area: 2,680 acres (10.8 km^{2})
- Established: 1988
- Visitors: 235,825 (in 2018–2019)
- Governing body: Indiana Department of Natural Resources
- Website: Official website

Summit Lake State Park is a park located near New Castle, Indiana in east-central Indiana. Summit Lake became Indiana's 19th state park in 1988. The park covers 2,680 acres (11 km^{2}), including an 800-acre (3.2 km^{2}) lake.

The park is a mix of woodlands, old fields, wetlands, and prairie restoration areas which provide a wide range of flora and fauna. More than 100 species of birds reside in the park, and the area is popular among photographers and bird watchers. Hiking trails offer good views of the lake. Zeigler Woods Nature Preserve, at the southwest corner of the park, is Henry County's only dedicated nature preserve. Summit Lake receives about 235,000 visitors annually.

The park was 1 of 14 Indiana State Parks in the path of totality for the 2024 solar eclipse, with the park experiencing 3 minutes and 59 seconds of totality.

== Facilities ==
- Boats
- Camping (water and electric hook-ups)
- Concessions
- Fishing
- Hiking
- Interpretive Naturalist Service
- Picnic areas
- Shelter house
- Beach swimming (seasonal)
