= Liberty Township, Henry County, Indiana =

Liberty Township
- Township
- Location in Henry County
- Coordinates: 39°55′15″N 85°15′42″W
- Country: United States
- State: Indiana
- County: Henry

Government
  - Type: Indiana township

Area
  - Total: 40.83 sq mi (105.7 km^{2})
  - Land: 40.79 sq mi (105.6 km^{2})
  - Water: 0.05 sq mi (0.13 km^{2}) 0.12%
- Elevation: 1,150 ft (350 m)

Population (2020)
  - Total: 1,457
  - Density: 35.7/sq mi (13.8/km^{2})
- GNIS feature ID: 0453556

Liberty Township is one of thirteen townships in Henry County, Indiana, United States. As of the 2010 census, its population was 1,455 and it contained 602 housing units.

Liberty Township was organized in 1822.

== Geography ==
According to the 2010 census, the township has a total area of 40.83 square miles (105.7 km^{2}), of which 40.79 square miles (105.6 km^{2}) (or 99.90%) is land and 0.05 square miles (0.13 km^{2}) (or 0.12%) is water. The streams of Bat Run, Batson Drain, Bell Run, Coo Run, Gravel Run, Millville Drain, Mud Run, Number One Arm, Number Two Arm, Pebble Run, Stone Branch, Tail Run and Wind Run run through this township.

=== Unincorporated towns ===
- Ashland
- Corwin
- Millville
- Pierson Station

(This list is based on USGS data and may include former settlements.)

=== Adjacent townships ===
- Blue River Township (north)
- Dalton Township, Wayne County (northeast)
- Jefferson Township, Wayne County (east)
- Jackson Township, Wayne County (southeast)
- Dudley Township (south)
- Franklin Township (southwest)
- Henry Township (west)
- Prairie Township (northwest)

=== Cemeteries ===
The township contains two cemeteries: Bell and White Heart.

=== Major highways ===
- Indiana State Road 38

=== Airports and landing strips ===
- New Castle-Henry County Municipal Airport
