= Greensboro Township, Henry County, Indiana =

Greensboro Township
- Township
- Location in Henry County
- Coordinates: 39°53′07″N 85°30′29″W
- Country: United States
- State: Indiana
- County: Henry

Government
  - Type: Indiana township

Area
  - Total: 25.61 sq mi (66.3 km^{2})
  - Land: 25.54 sq mi (66.1 km^{2})
  - Water: 0.07 sq mi (0.18 km^{2}) 0.27%
- Elevation: 1,040 ft (317 m)

Population (2020)
  - Total: 1,611
  - Density: 67.6/sq mi (26.1/km^{2})
- GNIS feature ID: 0453353

Greensboro Township is one of thirteen townships in Henry County, Indiana, United States. As of the 2010 census, its population was 1,728 and it contained 715 housing units.

Greensboro Township was organized in 1831. It was named after the city of Greensboro, North Carolina.

== Geography ==
According to the 2010 census, the township has a total area of 25.61 square miles (66.3 km^{2}), of which 25.54 square miles (66.1 km^{2}) (or 99.73%) is land and 0.07 square miles (0.18 km^{2}) (or 0.27%) is water. The streams of Bench Run, Dry Fork, Egg Run, Feather Fork, Goose Run, Goslin Creek, Hatch Brook, Mont Branch, Mount Lawn Brook, Quack Run, Quill Run, Ten Creek, Web Run and York Run run through this township.

=== Cities and towns ===
- Greensboro
- Kennard
- Shirley (east quarter)

=== Unincorporated towns ===
- Woodville

(This list is based on USGS data and may include former settlements.)

=== Adjacent townships ===
- Harrison Township (north)
- Henry Township (east)
- Spiceland Township (southeast)
- Wayne Township (southwest)
- Brown Township, Hancock County (west)

=== Cemeteries ===
The township contains four cemeteries: Greensboro Friends, Hicksite, Greensboro Township and Mason.

The Greensboro Friends Cemetery was established on 18 March 1825 and is located next to Greensboro Pike. Following the "great separation" of 1827-28 of the Quakers, Hicksite Cemetery was founded on 26 Oct 1830 as a ministry of the Greensboro Friends who were in the Hicksite Quaker faction.

The small Greensboro Township Cemetery is located immediately southwest of the smaller Mason Cemetery.

=== Major highways ===
- Indiana State Road 234
