= Grant City, Indiana =

- Unincorporated community
- Location within Indiana Location within the United States
- Coordinates: 39°51′59″N 85°32′33″W
- Country: United States
- State: Indiana
- County: Henry
- Township: Wayne
- Elevation: 1,014 ft (309 m)
- ZIP code: 47384
- FIPS code: 18-28890
- GNIS feature ID: 435319

Grant City is an unincorporated community in Wayne Township, Henry County, Indiana.

== History ==
Grant City was platted in October 1868. It was named for Ulysses S. Grant, then known for his role as Commanding General of the United States Army, and afterward 18th President of the United States. The post office once located at Grant City was called Snyder. This post office operated from 1888 until 1901.
