= Ogden, Indiana =

Unincorporated community in Indiana, U.S.

Coordinates: 39°47′57″N 85°28′08″W

Ogden is an unincorporated community in Henry County, Indiana, in the United States.

== History ==
Ogden was originally called Middletown, and under the latter name was laid out and platted in 1829. When it was discovered that nearby Middletown, Henry County, Indiana, had been platted two months prior, the town was renamed in honor of an engineer on the National Road project.

A post office was established in Ogden in 1840, and remained in operation until it was discontinued in 1906.
