= Maple Valley, Ontario =

Maple Valley, Ontario is the name of two communities in Simcoe County, Ontario:

- Maple Valley, Clearview, in the township of Clearview, Ontario
- Maple Valley, Severn, in the township of Severn, Ontario
