= Dudley Township, Henry County, Indiana =

Dudley Township
- Township
- Location in Henry County
- Coordinates: 39°49′55″N 85°16′39″W
- Country: United States
- State: Indiana
- County: Henry

Area
  - Total: 30.88 sq mi (80.0 km^{2})
  - Land: 30.81 sq mi (79.8 km^{2})
  - Water: 0.07 sq mi (0.18 km^{2}) 0.23%
- Elevation: 1,102 ft (336 m)

Population (2020)
  - Total: 1,121
  - Density: 33.8/sq mi (13.1/km^{2})
- GNIS feature ID: 0453268

Dudley Township is one of thirteen townships in Henry County, Indiana, United States. As of the 2010 census, its population was 1,041 and it contained 454 housing units.

Dudley Township was established in 1822.

== Geography ==
According to the 2010 census, the township has a total area of 30.88 square miles (80.0 km^{2}), of which 30.81 square miles (79.8 km^{2}) (or 99.77%) is land and 0.07 square miles (0.18 km^{2}) (or 0.23%) is water. The streams of Glue Run and Roy Run run through this township.

=== Cities and towns ===
- Straughn

=== Unincorporated towns ===
- New Lisbon

(This list is based on USGS data and may include former settlements.)

=== Adjacent townships ===
- Liberty Township (north)
- Jackson Township, Wayne County (east)
- Posey Township, Fayette County (south)
- Washington Township, Rush County (southwest)
- Franklin Township (west)

=== Major highways ===
- Interstate 70
- U.S. Route 40
