= Stoney Creek Township, Henry County, Indiana =

Stoney Creek Township
- Township
- Location in Henry County
- Coordinates: 40°02′45″N 85°15′19″W
- Country: United States
- State: Indiana
- County: Henry

Government
  - Type: Indiana township

Area
  - Total: 19.92 sq mi (51.6 km^{2})
  - Land: 19.31 sq mi (50.0 km^{2})
  - Water: 0.61 sq mi (1.6 km^{2}) 3.06%
- Elevation: 1,112 ft (339 m)

Population (2020)
  - Total: 810
  - Density: 42.3/sq mi (16.3/km^{2})
- GNIS feature ID: 0453877

Stoney Creek Township is one of thirteen townships in Henry County, Indiana, United States. As of the 2010 census, its population was 817 and it contained 348 housing units.

Stony Creek Township was organized in 1828. It was named for the stream which runs through it.

== Geography ==
According to the 2010 census, the township has a total area of 19.92 square miles (51.6 km^{2}), of which 19.31 square miles (50.0 km^{2}) (or 96.94%) is land and 0.61 square miles (1.6 km^{2}) (or 3.06%) is water.

=== Cities and towns ===
- Blountsville

=== Adjacent townships ===
- Perry Township, Delaware County (north)
- Union Township, Randolph County (east)
- Blue River Township (south)
- Prairie Township (west)

=== Cemeteries ===
The township contains two cemeteries: Hodson and Rogersville.

=== Major highways ===
- U.S. Route 35

=== Airports and landing strips ===
- Starkeys Airport

== Education ==
It is in the Union School Corporation.
