= Kennard, Indiana =

Town of Kennard, Indiana
- Town
- Seal

- Location of Kennard in Henry County, Indiana.
- Coordinates: 39°54′19″N 85°31′20″W
- Country: United States
- State: Indiana
- County: Henry
- Township: Greensboro
- Established: 1882

Area
  - Total: 0.42 sq mi (1.10 km^{2})
  - Land: 0.42 sq mi (1.10 km^{2})
  - Water: 0 sq mi (0.00 km^{2})
- Elevation: 1,037 ft (316 m)

Population (2020)
  - Total: 451
  - Estimate (2025): 446 ▼
  - Density: 1,065.0/sq mi (411.21/km^{2})
- Time zone: UTC-5 (EST)
  - Summer (DST): UTC-4 (EDT)
- ZIP code: 47351
- Area code: 765
- FIPS code: 18-39438
- GNIS feature ID: 2397014
- Website: www.kennardin.com

Kennard is a town in Greensboro Township, Henry County, Indiana, United States. The population was 451 at the 2020 census.

== History ==
Kennard was platted in 1882, and named for Jenkins Kennard. Cyrus Hinshaw helped to found the town and was instrumental in having the town named for Jenkins Kennard. Hinshaw Street was named after Cyrus and his family. On April 3, 1974, a multi-vortex F4 tornado hit Kennard, Indiana. The storm removed the entire second-story of the Kennard High School and destroyed 70% of the Town, including the Kennard Town Hall and fire station. 17 people were injured and one newborn child was killed in the storm.

== Geography ==
According to the 2010 census, Kennard has a total area of 0.42 square miles (1.09 km^{2}), all land.

== Demographics ==
Historical population
Census	Pop.	Note	%±
1900	417		—
1910	449		7.7%
1920	541		20.5%
1930	440		−18.7%
1940	522		18.6%
1950	485		−7.1%
1960	466		−3.9%
1970	518		11.2%
1980	441		−14.9%
1990	382		−13.4%
2000	455		19.1%
2010	471		3.5%
2020	451		−4.2%
2025 (est.)	446	▼	−1.1%
U.S. Decennial Census

=== 2010 census ===
As of the census of 2010, there were 471 people, 160 households, and 121 families living in the town. The population density was 1,121.4 inhabitants per square mile (433.0/km^{2}). There were 181 housing units at an average density of 431.0 per square mile (166.4/km^{2}). The racial makeup of the town was 99.2% White, 0.6% Asian, and 0.2% from two or more races.

There were 160 households, of which 46.3% had children under the age of 18 living with them, 56.3% were married couples living together, 15.0% had a female householder with no husband present, 4.4% had a male householder with no wife present, and 24.4% were non-families. 18.1% of all households were made up of individuals, and 9.4% had someone living alone who was 65 years of age or older. The average household size was 2.94 and the average family size was 3.31.

The median age in the town was 34.3 years. 30.6% of residents were under the age of 18; 6.3% were between the ages of 18 and 24; 30.4% were from 25 to 44; 20.2% were from 45 to 64; and 12.5% were 65 years of age or older. The gender makeup of the town was 51.2% male and 48.8% female.

=== 2000 census ===
As of the census of 2000, there were 455 people, 163 households, and 120 families living in the town. The population density was 1,568.5 inhabitants per square mile (605.6/km^{2}). There were 168 housing units at an average density of 579.1 per square mile (223.6/km^{2}). The racial makeup of the town was 99.56% White, 0.22% African American, and 0.22% from two or more races. Hispanic or Latino of any race were 0.88% of the population.

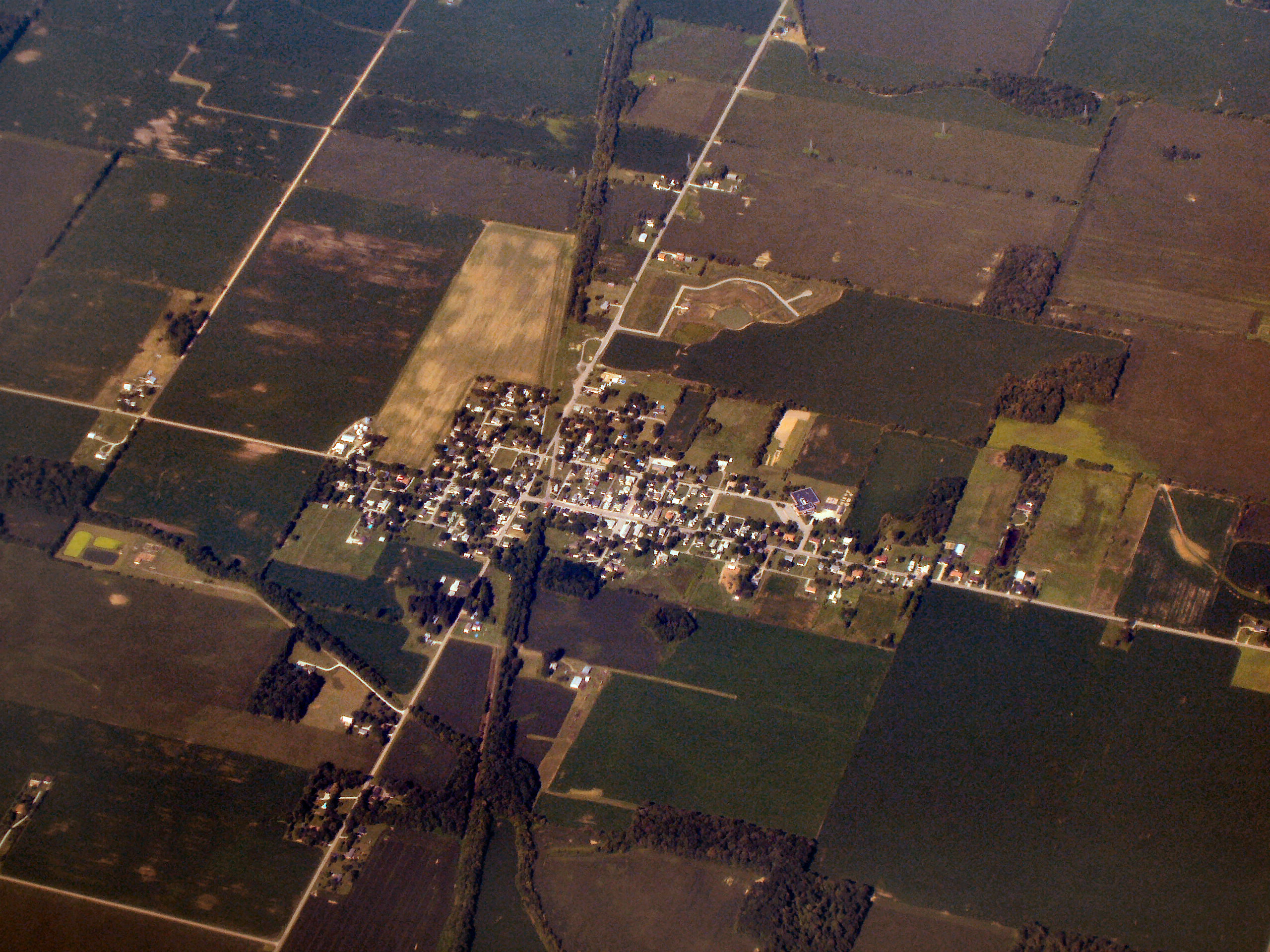
Kennard from the air, looking southwest.

There were 163 households, out of which 42.3% had children under the age of 18 living with them, 60.7% were married couples living together, 10.4% had a female householder with no husband present, and 25.8% were non-families. 24.5% of all households were made up of individuals, and 13.5% had someone living alone who was 65 years of age or older. The average household size was 2.79 and the average family size was 3.31.

In the town, the population was spread out, with 33.4% under the age of 18, 5.5% from 18 to 24, 31.9% from 25 to 44, 14.7% from 45 to 64, and 14.5% who were 65 years of age or older. The median age was 32 years. For every 100 females, there were 97.0 males. For every 100 females age 18 and over, there were 90.6 males.

The median income for a household in the town was $31,364, and the median income for a family was $40,227. Males had a median income of $37,361 versus $24,063 for females. The per capita income for the town was $14,139. About 5.5% of families and 10.0% of the population were below the poverty line, including 15.2% of those under age 18 and 5.8% of those age 65 or over.
