= Honey Creek, Indiana =

- Village
- Location within Indiana Location within the United States
- Coordinates: 40°02′02″N 85°29′08″W
- Country: United States
- State: Indiana
- County: Henry
- Township: Fall Creek
- Elevation: 1,017 ft (310 m)
- ZIP code: 47356
- FIPS code: 18-34510
- GNIS feature ID: 449671

Honey Creek was a village in Fall Creek Township, Henry County, Indiana, United States, 9.5 miles (15.3 km) from New Castle and 4 miles (6.4 km) southeast from Middletown.

Honey Creek was founded in 1858 near the stream from which it took its name. It had a post office established on 1861-06-18, and a railway station; and was originally called Warnock's Station, after the person who had owned the land. It was on the Pittsburgh, Cincinnati, Chicago, and St Louis Railway. The first postmaster was Zadock G. Tomlinson.

== Notable people ==
Thane Houser, Indy car driver
