= Blue River Township, Henry County, Indiana =

Blue River Township
- Township
- Location in Henry County
- Coordinates: 39°59′25″N 85°15′25″W
- Country: United States
- State: Indiana
- County: Henry

Government
  - Type: Indiana township

Area
  - Total: 22.05 sq mi (57.1 km^{2})
  - Land: 21.98 sq mi (56.9 km^{2})
  - Water: 0.07 sq mi (0.18 km^{2}) 0.32%
- Elevation: 1,112 ft (339 m)

Population (2020)
  - Total: 1,106
  - Density: 55.7/sq mi (21.5/km^{2})
- GNIS feature ID: 0453119

Blue River Township is one of thirteen townships in Henry County, Indiana, United States. As of the 2010 census, its population was 1,224 and it contained 500 housing units.

Blue River Township was organized in 1848.

== Geography ==
According to the 2010 census, the township has a total area of 22.05 square miles (57.1 km^{2}), of which 21.98 square miles (56.9 km^{2}) (or 99.68%) is land and 0.07 square miles (0.18 km^{2}) (or 0.32%) is water. The streams of Number Four Arm and Wilbur Wright Creek run through this township.

=== Cities and towns ===
- Mooreland

=== Unincorporated towns ===
- Messick

(This list is based on USGS data and may include former settlements.)

=== Adjacent townships ===
- Stoney Creek Township (north)
- Union Township, Randolph County (northeast)
- Dalton Township, Wayne County (east)
- Liberty Township (south)
- Prairie Township (west)

=== Cemeteries ===
The township contains one cemetery, Bales.

=== Major highways ===
- U.S. Route 36
