= Spiceland, Indiana =

- Town
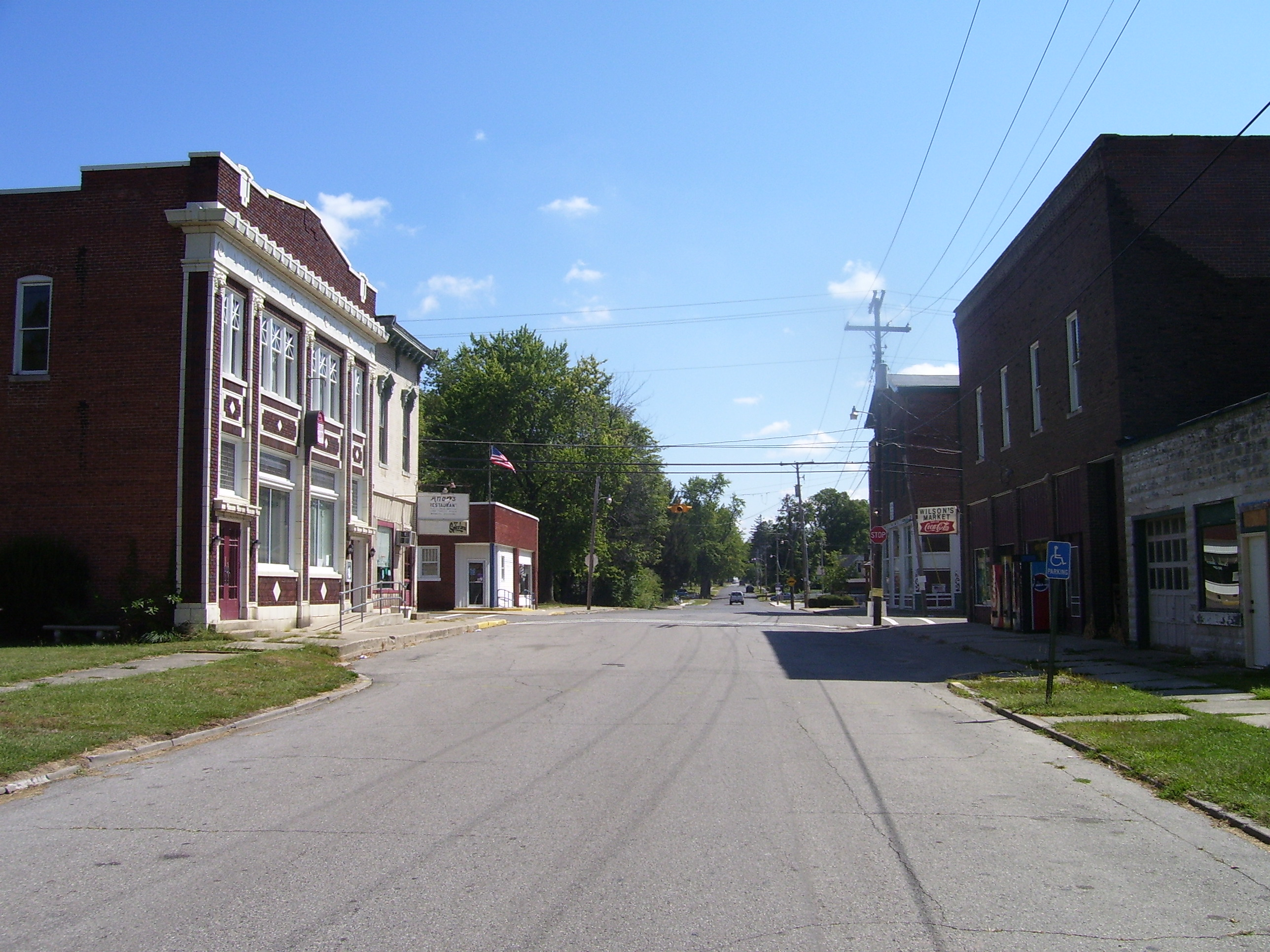
- Spiceland Downtown
- Motto: "quaint, peaceful, residential life"
- Location of Spiceland in Henry County, Indiana.
- Coordinates: 39°50′35″N 85°25′34″W
- Country: United States
- State: Indiana
- County: Henry
- Township: Spiceland

Area
  - Total: 1.46 sq mi (3.78 km^{2})
  - Land: 1.46 sq mi (3.78 km^{2})
  - Water: 0 sq mi (0.00 km^{2})
- Elevation: 1,066 ft (325 m)

Population (2020)
  - Total: 958
  - Estimate (2025): 960 ▲
  - Density: 657/sq mi (253.7/km^{2})
- Time zone: UTC-5 (Eastern (EST))
  - Summer (DST): UTC-4 (EDT)
- ZIP code: 47385
- Area code: 765
- FIPS code: 18-72008
- GNIS feature ID: 2397672
- Website: www.spicelandtown.org

Spiceland is a town in Spiceland Township, Henry County, Indiana, United States. As of the 2020 census, Spiceland had a population of 958.

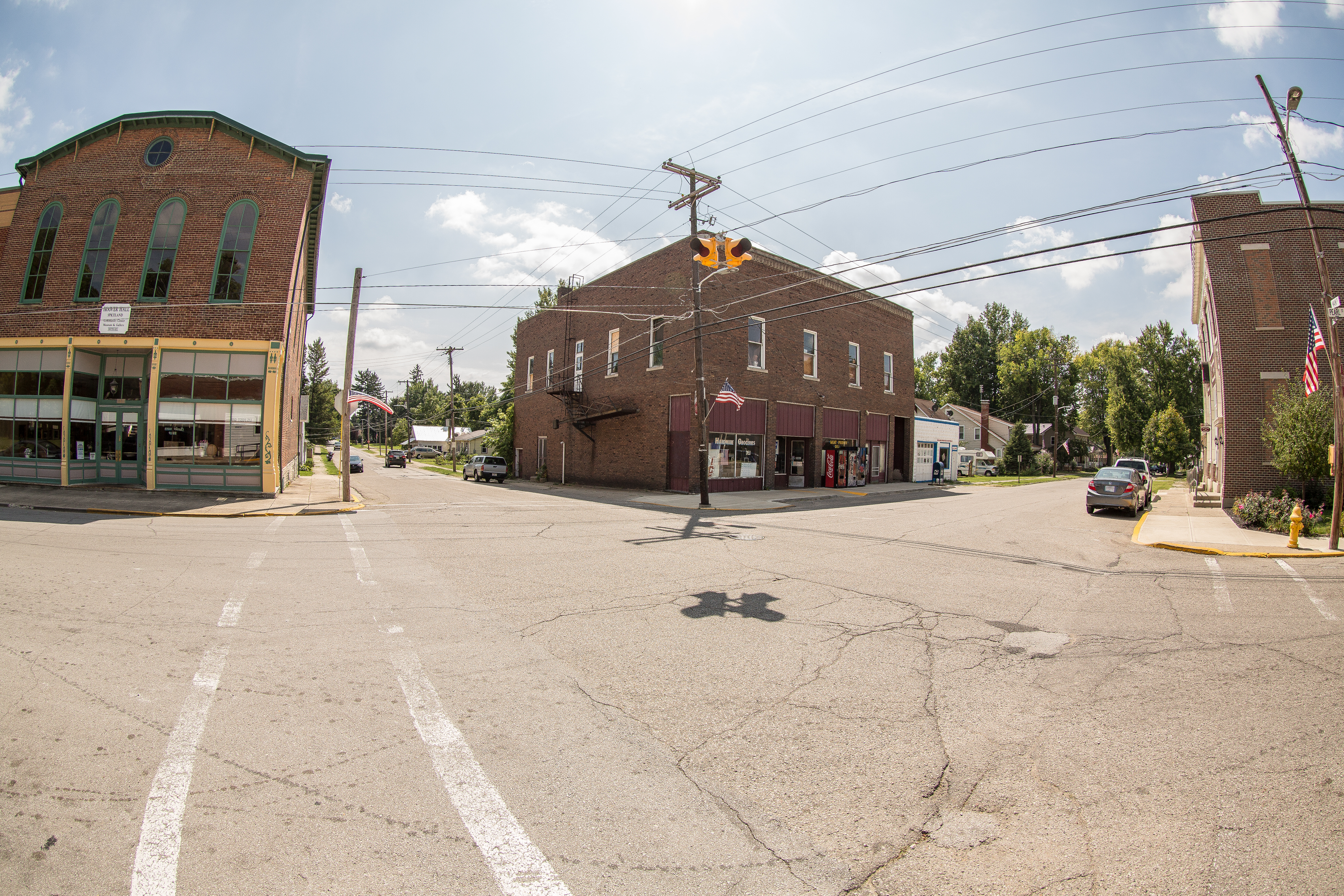
Spiceland, Indiana

== History ==
Spiceland was platted in 1850. The town was so named on account of spice bushes near the original town site. It was primarily an agricultural area for spices.

In February 2001 James Parker and Robert Tulloch, wanted in the 2001 Dartmouth College murders in New Hampshire, were arrested at a truck stop here. They had hitchhiked with truckers to this point and been tracked down by police after a driver's casual announcement on his CB radio that the pair were traveling west.

== Geography ==
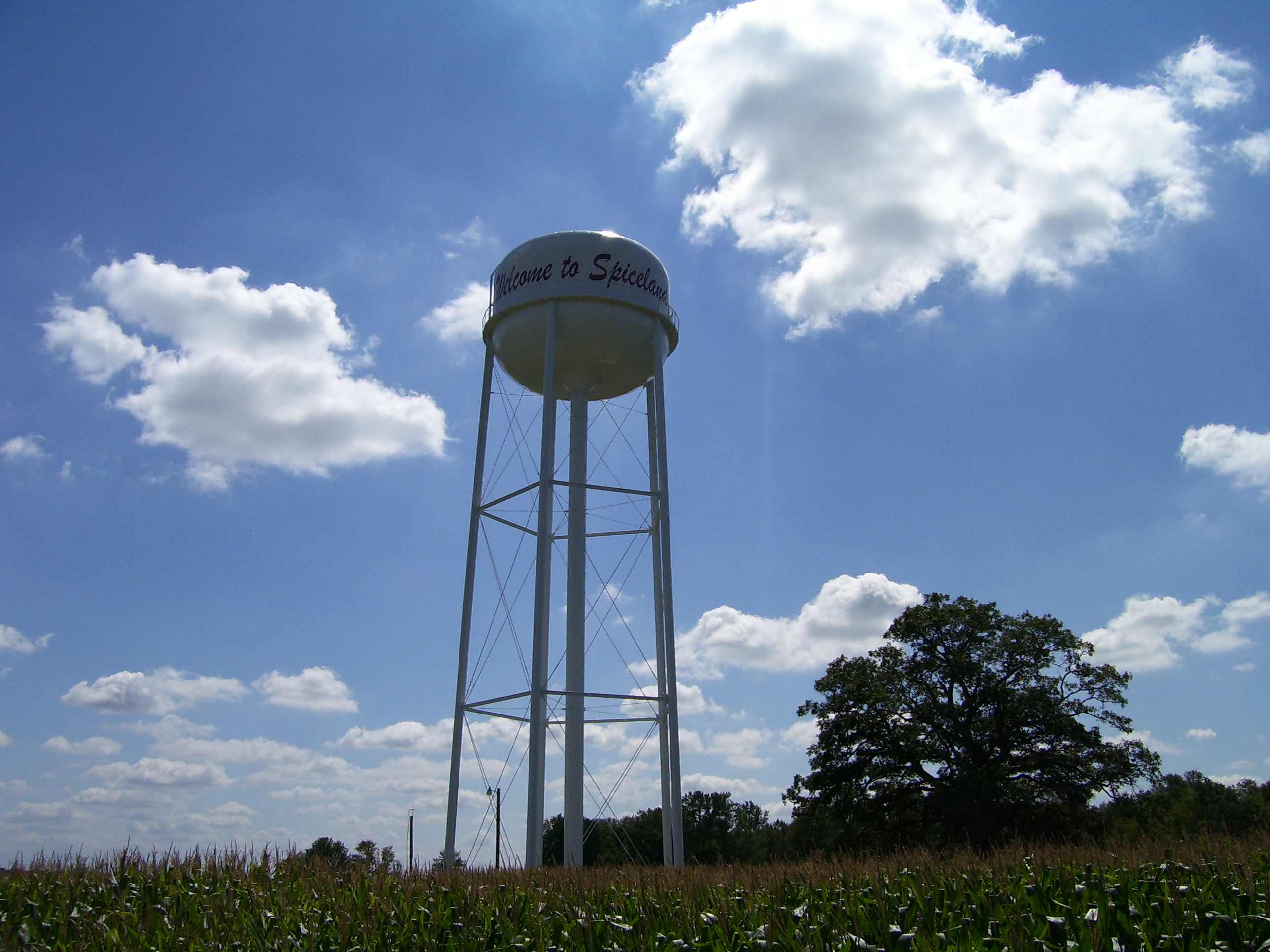
Spiceland water tower

According to the 2010 census, Spiceland has a total area of 0.5 square miles (1.29 km^{2}), all land.

== Demographics ==
Historical population
Census	Pop.	Note	%±
1870	370		—
1880	527		42.4%
1890	637		20.9%
1900	590		−7.4%
1910	622		5.4%
1920	632		1.6%
1930	722		14.2%
1940	645		−10.7%
1950	739		14.6%
1960	863		16.8%
1970	957		10.9%
1980	940		−1.8%
1990	757		−19.5%
2000	807		6.6%
2010	890		10.3%
2020	958		7.6%
2025 (est.)	960	▲	0.2%
U.S. Decennial Census

=== 2010 census ===
As of the census of 2010, there were 890 people, 353 households, and 256 families living in the town. The population density was 1,780.0 inhabitants per square mile (687.3/km^{2}). There were 389 housing units at an average density of 778.0 per square mile (300.4/km^{2}). The racial makeup of the town was 98.5% White, 0.1% African American, 0.2% Asian, 0.7% from other races, and 0.4% from two or more races. Hispanic or Latino of any race were 0.7% of the population.

There were 353 households, of which 34.8% had children under the age of 18 living with them, 58.4% were married couples living together, 9.3% had a female householder with no husband present, 4.8% had a male householder with no wife present, and 27.5% were non-families. 24.9% of all households were made up of individuals, and 13.3% had someone living alone who was 65 years of age or older. The average household size was 2.52 and the average family size was 2.99.

The median age in the town was 39.5 years. 26.9% of residents were under the age of 18; 5.9% were between the ages of 18 and 24; 23.6% were from 25 to 44; 27.1% were from 45 to 64; and 16.5% were 65 years of age or older. The gender makeup of the town was 49.0% male and 51.0% female.

=== 2000 census ===
As of the census of 2000, there were 807 people, 327 households, and 240 families living in the town. The population density was 1,838.6 inhabitants per square mile (709.9/km^{2}). There were 340 housing units at an average density of 774.6 per square mile (299.1/km^{2}). The racial makeup of the town was 98.14% White, 0.12% African American, 0.25% Native American, 1.12% from other races, and 0.37% from two or more races. Hispanic or Latino of any race were 1.61% of the population.

There were 327 households, of which 30.3% had children under the age of 18 living with them, 64.2% were married couples living together, 7.6% had a female householder with no husband present, and 26.6% were non-families. 24.2% of all households were made up of individuals, and 12.2% had someone living alone who was 65 years of age or older. The average household size was 2.47 and the average family size was 2.92.

In the town, the population was spread out, with 25.0% under the age of 18, 7.7% from 18 to 24, 30.7% from 25 to 44, 23.9% from 45 to 64, and 12.6% who were 65 years of age or older. The median age was 36 years. For every 100 females, there were 93.1 males. For every 100 females age 18 and over, there were 88.5 males.

The median income for a household in the town was $45,875, and the median income for a family was $54,904. Males had a median income of $37,333 versus $28,393 for females. The per capita income for the town was $20,419. About 2.3% of families and 2.5% of the population were below the poverty line, including 3.1% of those under age 18 and 6.9% of those age 65 or over.

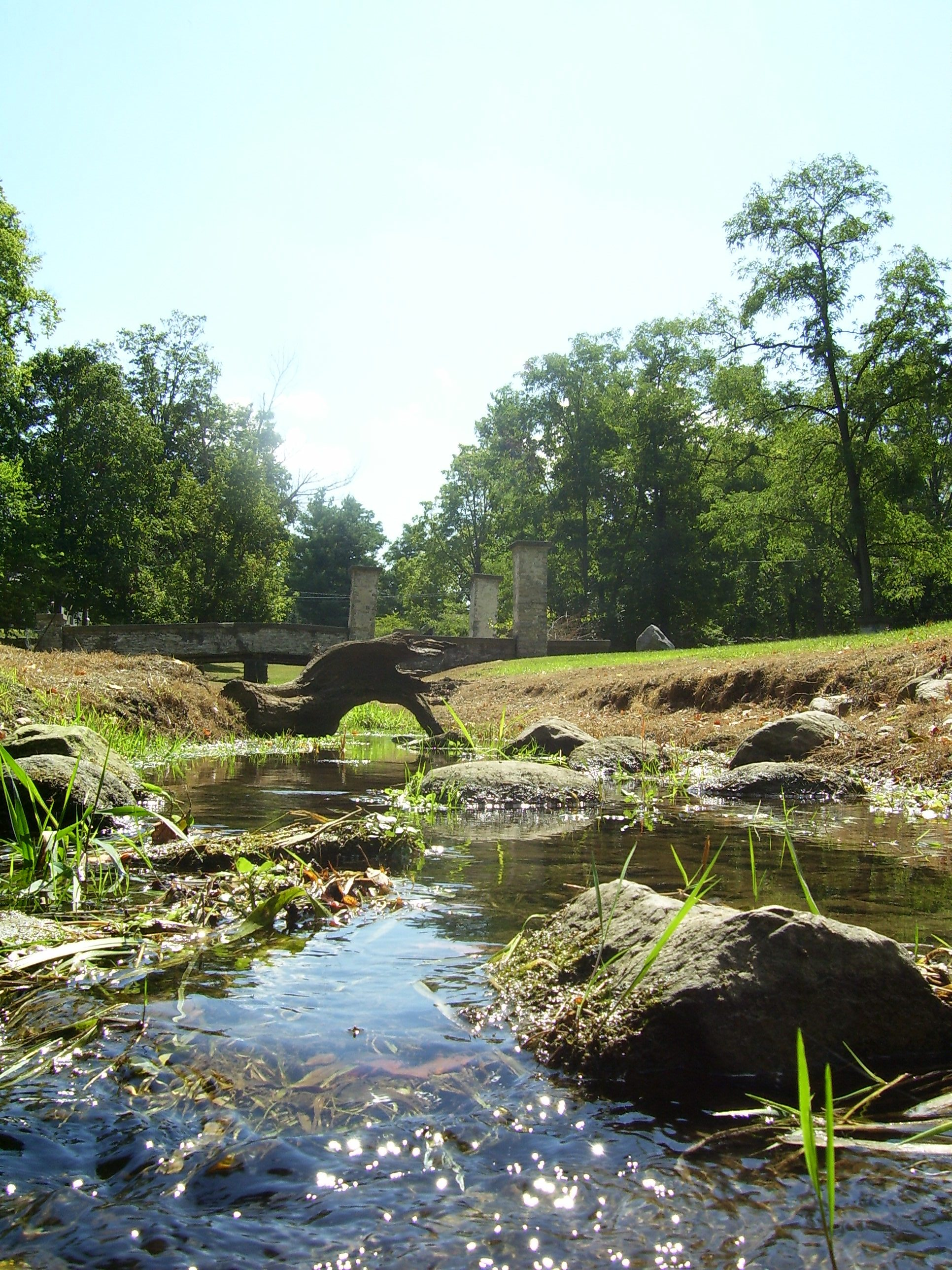
Spiceland Park.

== Education ==
The town has a lending library, the Spiceland Town-Township Public Library.
