= Messick, Indiana =

- Unincorporated community
- Location within Indiana Location within the United States
- Coordinates: 39°58′31″N 85°18′10″W
- Country: United States
- State: Indiana
- County: Henry
- Township: Blue River
- Elevation: 1,073 ft (327 m)
- ZIP code: 47362
- FIPS code: 18-48546
- GNIS feature ID: 439043

Messick is an unincorporated community in Blue River Township, Henry County, Indiana.

== History ==
Messick was founded in 1882 when the railroad was extended to that point. A man named Messick owned a general store in town. A post office was established in Messick in 1884, and remained in operation until it was discontinued in 1926.
