= Henry County, Indiana =

County in Indiana, United States

- County
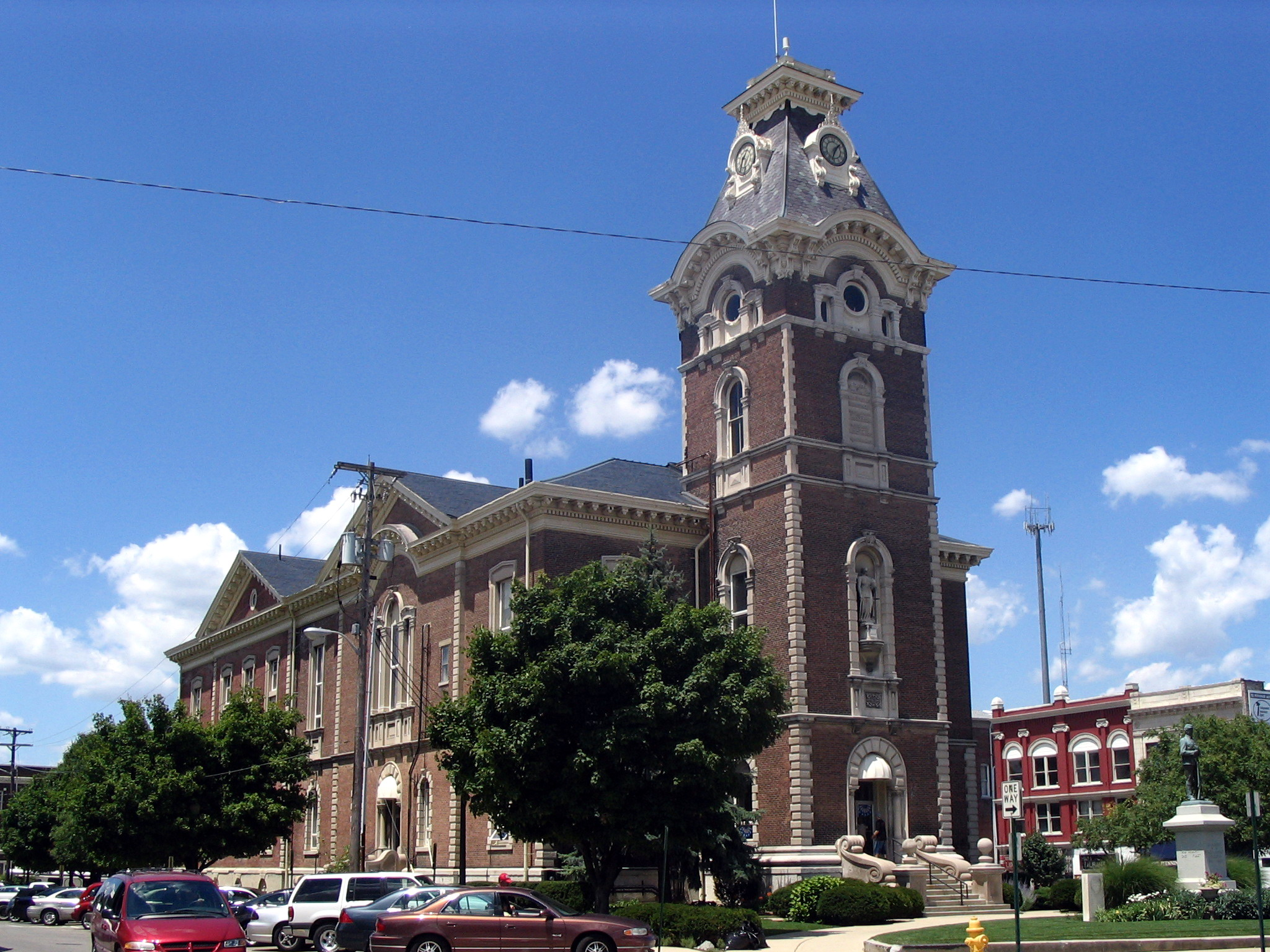
- Henry County Courthouse

- Logo

- Location within the U.S. state of Indiana
- Coordinates: 39°56′N 85°24′W
- Country: United States
- State: Indiana
- Founded: 1822
- Named for: Patrick Henry
- Seat: New Castle
- Largest city: New Castle

Area
  - Total: 394.83 sq mi (1,022.6 km^{2})
  - Land: 391.88 sq mi (1,015.0 km^{2})
  - Water: 2.96 sq mi (7.7 km^{2}) 0.75%

Population (2020)
  - Total: 48,914
  - Estimate (2025): 49,137 ▲
  - Density: 124.82/sq mi (48.193/km^{2})
- Time zone: UTC−5 (Eastern)
  - Summer (DST): UTC−4 (EDT)
- Congressional district: 6th
- Website: henrycounty.in.gov
- Indiana county number 33

Henry County is a county located in east central Indiana, United States. As of 2020, the population was 48,914. The county seat and largest and only city is New Castle. Henry County is the main setting of the novel Raintree County by Ross Lockridge Jr.

== History ==
Henry County was formed in 1822 from the Delaware New Purchase resulting from the Treaty of St. Mary's in 1818. It was named for Patriot Patrick Henry, governor of Virginia.

== Geography ==
According to the 2010 census, the county has a total area of 394.83 square miles (1,022.6 km^{2}), of which 391.88 square miles (1,015.0 km^{2}) (or 99.25%) is land and 2.96 square miles (7.7 km^{2}) (or 0.75%) is water.

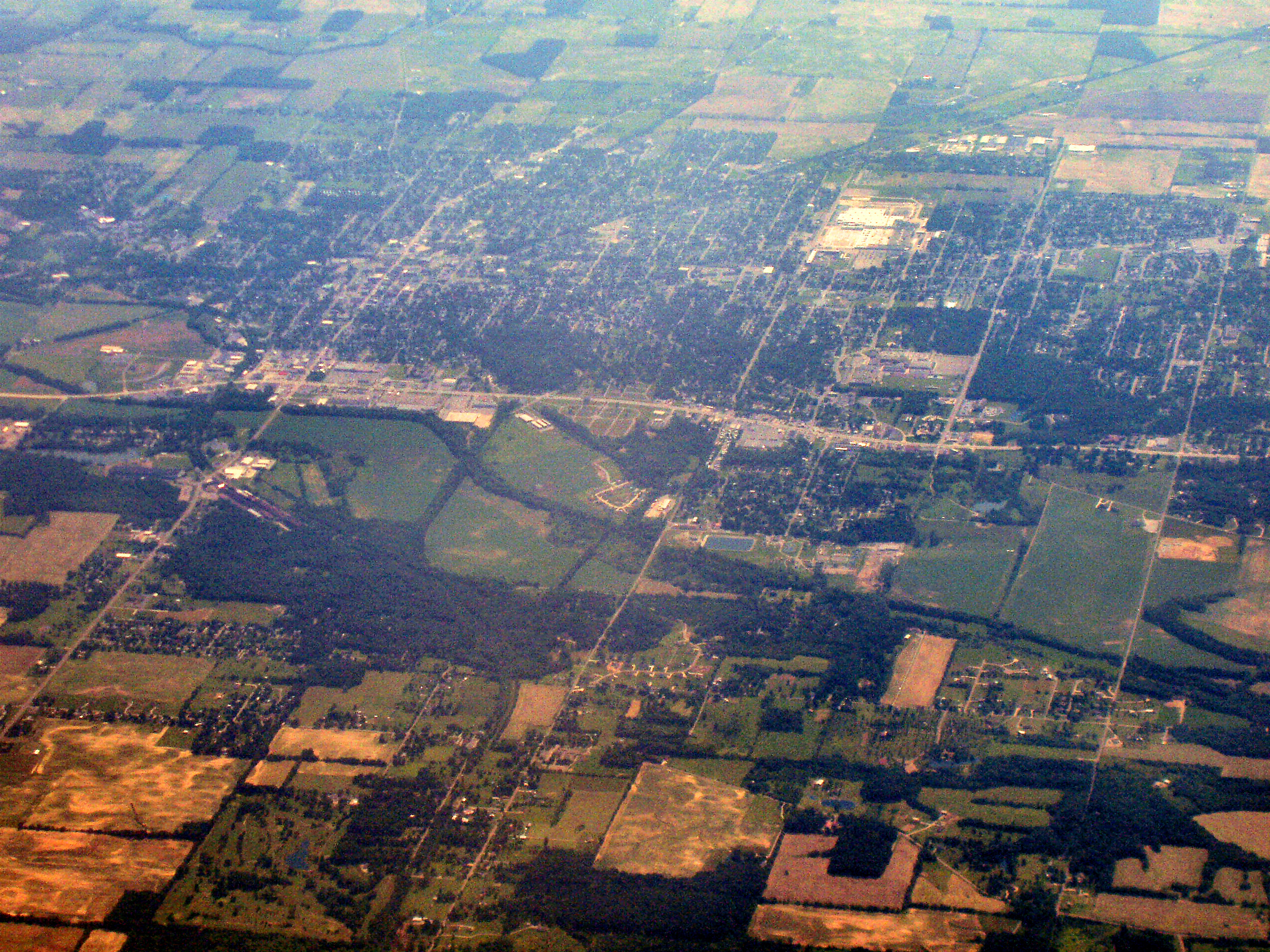
New Castle from the air, looking east.

=== Cities ===
- New Castle

=== Towns ===
- Blountsville
- Cadiz
- Dunreith
- Greensboro
- Kennard
- Knightstown
- Lewisville
- Middletown
- Mooreland
- Mount Summit
- Shirley
- Spiceland
- Springport
- Straughn
- Sulphur Springs

=== Unincorporated areas ===
- Ashland
- Corwin
- Foley
- Grant City
- Hillsboro
- Honey Creek
- Knox
- Luray
- Maple Valley
- Mechanicsburg
- Messick
- Millville
- New Lisbon
- Ogden
- Raysville
- Rogersville
- Stone Quarry Mills
- Westwood

=== Townships ===
- Blue River
- Dudley
- Fall Creek
- Franklin
- Greensboro
- Harrison
- Henry
- Jefferson
- Liberty
- Prairie
- Spiceland
- Stoney Creek
- Wayne

=== Reservoirs ===
- Castle Lake
- Giboney Lake
- Haven, Lake
- Summit Lake Reservoir
- Westwood Park Reservoir

=== Adjacent counties ===
- Delaware County (north)
- Randolph County (northeast)
- Wayne County (east)
- Fayette County (southeast)
- Rush County (south)
- Hancock County (southwest)
- Madison County (northwest)

=== Major highways ===
Sources: National Atlas, U.S. Census Bureau

- Interstate 70
- U.S. Route 35
- U.S. Route 36
- U.S. Route 40
- State Road 3
- State Road 38
- State Road 103
- State Road 109
- State Road 140
- State Road 234
- State Road 236

== Climate and weather ==
New Castle, Indiana

Climate chart (precipitation, max. and min. temperature)
J	F	M	A	M	J	J	A	S	O	N	D
2.2 33 16	2.3 38 19	3 49 28	3.9 60 37	4.7 71 48	4.6 80 57	4.7 84 61	3.6 82 59	2.9 76 52	2.9 64 41	3.7 50 32	2.8 38 22
- █ Average max. and min. temperatures in °F
- █ Precipitation totals in inches
- Source: The Weather Channel
Metric conversion
J	F	M	A	M	J	J	A	S	O	N	D
57 1 −9	57 3 −7	75 9 −2	100 16 3	119 22 9	117 27 14	119 29 16	91 28 15	73 24 11	75 18 5	93 10 0	71 3 −6
- █ Average max. and min. temperatures in °C
- █ Precipitation totals in mm

In recent years, average temperatures in New Castle have ranged from a low of 16 °F (−9 °C) in January to a high of 84 °F (29 °C) in July, although a record low of −26 °F (−32 °C) was recorded in January 1994 and a record high of 103 °F (39 °C) was recorded in June 1988. Average monthly precipitation ranged from 2.24 inches (57 mm) in January to 4.70 inches (119 mm) in May.

== Government ==
The county government is a constitutional body, and is granted specific powers by the Constitution of Indiana, and by the Indiana Code.

County Council: The county council is the legislative branch of the county government and controls all the spending and revenue collection in the county. Representatives are elected from county districts. The council members serve four-year terms. They are responsible for setting salaries, the annual budget, and special spending. The council also has limited authority to impose local taxes, in the form of an income and property tax that is subject to state level approval, excise taxes, and service taxes.

County Commissioners: The executive body of the county is made of a board of commissioners. The commissioners are elected county-wide, in staggered terms, and each serves a four-year term. One of the commissioners, typically the most senior, serves as president. The commissioners are charged with executing the acts legislated by the council, collecting revenue, and managing the day-to-day functions of the county government.

County Courts: The county maintains three courts. Circuit Court I, Circuit Court II and Circuit Court III. The judge on the court is elected to a term of four years and must be a member of the Indiana Bar Association. In some cases, court decisions can be appealed to the state level circuit court.

County Officials: The county has several other elected offices, including sheriff, coroner, auditor, treasurer, recorder, surveyor, and circuit court clerk Each of these elected officers serves a term of four years and oversees a different part of county government. Members elected to county government positions are required to declare party affiliations and to be residents of the county.

Henry County is part of Indiana's 6th congressional district; Indiana Senate district 28; and Indiana House of Representatives districts 54 and 56.

United States presidential election results for Henry County, Indiana
Year	Republican		Democratic		Third party(ies)	
Year	No.	%	No.	%	No.	%
1888	3,849	60.07%	2,277	35.54%	281	4.39%
1892	3,336	55.04%	1,871	30.87%	854	14.09%
1896	4,001	56.43%	2,980	42.03%	109	1.54%
1900	4,047	56.72%	2,754	38.60%	334	4.68%
1904	4,391	59.99%	2,482	33.91%	446	6.09%
1908	4,358	54.63%	3,197	40.07%	423	5.30%
1912	2,479	32.12%	2,687	34.82%	2,551	33.06%
1916	4,386	50.01%	3,560	40.59%	825	9.41%
1920	8,742	57.03%	5,824	38.00%	762	4.97%
1924	8,800	60.85%	5,376	37.18%	285	1.97%
1928	10,502	68.53%	4,554	29.72%	268	1.75%
1932	8,430	48.67%	8,255	47.66%	634	3.66%
1936	9,099	46.85%	10,172	52.38%	149	0.77%
1940	11,051	52.98%	9,623	46.14%	184	0.88%
1944	10,583	54.85%	8,297	43.00%	416	2.16%
1948	10,487	54.00%	8,523	43.89%	411	2.12%
1952	14,184	61.99%	8,378	36.61%	320	1.40%
1956	13,750	61.33%	8,502	37.92%	166	0.74%
1960	13,752	58.44%	9,629	40.92%	149	0.63%
1964	10,184	44.87%	12,374	54.52%	139	0.61%
1968	11,626	52.61%	8,045	36.41%	2,426	10.98%
1972	14,538	71.94%	5,610	27.76%	60	0.30%
1976	11,620	53.19%	10,137	46.40%	91	0.42%
1980	12,724	60.03%	7,626	35.98%	846	3.99%
1984	11,926	62.56%	7,064	37.06%	72	0.38%
1988	11,280	59.01%	7,779	40.69%	57	0.30%
1992	8,720	43.62%	6,794	33.99%	4,475	22.39%
1996	8,537	45.68%	7,667	41.03%	2,484	13.29%
2000	10,321	56.35%	7,647	41.75%	347	1.89%
2004	13,137	64.07%	7,176	35.00%	191	0.93%
2008	10,896	51.11%	10,059	47.18%	364	1.71%
2012	10,838	57.02%	7,613	40.05%	556	2.93%
2016	13,895	68.48%	5,124	25.25%	1,271	6.26%
2020	15,043	71.43%	5,544	26.32%	474	2.25%
2024	15,033	72.76%	5,208	25.21%	419	2.03%

== Demographics ==
Historical population
Census	Pop.	Note	%±
1830	6,497		—
1840	15,128		132.8%
1850	17,605		16.4%
1860	20,119		14.3%
1870	22,986		14.3%
1880	24,016		4.5%
1890	23,879		−0.6%
1900	25,088		5.1%
1910	29,758		18.6%
1920	34,682		16.5%
1930	35,238		1.6%
1940	40,208		14.1%
1950	45,505		13.2%
1960	48,899		7.5%
1970	52,603		7.6%
1980	53,336		1.4%
1990	48,139		−9.7%
2000	48,508		0.8%
2010	49,462		2.0%
2020	48,914		−1.1%
2025 (est.)	49,137	▲	0.5%
U.S. Decennial Census; 1790-1960 1900-1990; 1990-2000 2010-2013

=== Racial and ethnic composition ===
Henry County, Indiana – Racial and ethnic composition Note: the US Census treats Hispanic/Latino as an ethnic category. This table excludes Latinos from the racial categories and assigns them to a separate category. Hispanics/Latinos may be of any race.
Race / Ethnicity (NH = Non-Hispanic)	Pop 1980	Pop 1990	Pop 2000	Pop 2010	Pop 2020	% 1980	% 1990	% 2000	% 2010	% 2020
White alone (NH)	52,434	47,291	47,274	46,933	45,105	98.31%	98.24%	97.46%	94.89%	92.21%
Black or African American alone (NH)	484	471	412	1,064	1,066	0.91%	0.98%	0.85%	2.15%	2.18%
Native American or Alaska Native alone (NH)	67	76	72	63	67	0.13%	0.16%	0.15%	0.13%	0.14%
Asian alone (NH)	48	77	92	154	197	0.09%	0.16%	0.19%	0.31%	0.40%
Native Hawaiian or Pacific Islander alone (NH)	x	x	5	5	5	x	x	0.01%	0.01%	0.01%
Other race alone (NH)	30	10	28	34	106	0.06%	0.02%	0.06%	0.07%	0.22%
Mixed race or Multiracial (NH)	x	x	238	518	1,391	x	x	0.49%	1.05%	2.84%
Hispanic or Latino (any race)	273	214	387	691	977	0.51%	0.44%	0.80%	1.40%	2.00%
Total	53,336	48,139	48,508	49,462	48,914	100.00%	100.00%	100.00%	100.00%	100.00%

=== 2020 census ===
As of the 2020 census, the county had a population of 48,914. The median age was 43.4 years. 20.2% of residents were under the age of 18 and 20.0% of residents were 65 years of age or older. For every 100 females there were 109.3 males, and for every 100 females age 18 and over there were 109.3 males age 18 and over.

The racial makeup of the county was 92.8% White, 2.2% Black or African American, 0.2% American Indian and Alaska Native, 0.4% Asian, <0.1% Native Hawaiian and Pacific Islander, 1.1% from some other race, and 3.3% from two or more races. Hispanic or Latino residents of any race comprised 2.0% of the population.

37.9% of residents lived in urban areas, while 62.1% lived in rural areas.

There were 18,954 households in the county, of which 27.9% had children under the age of 18 living in them. Of all households, 47.7% were married-couple households, 18.1% were households with a male householder and no spouse or partner present, and 26.2% were households with a female householder and no spouse or partner present. About 28.7% of all households were made up of individuals and 13.5% had someone living alone who was 65 years of age or older.

There were 20,952 housing units, of which 9.5% were vacant. Among occupied housing units, 73.1% were owner-occupied and 26.9% were renter-occupied. The homeowner vacancy rate was 1.9% and the rental vacancy rate was 9.9%.

=== 2010 Census ===
As of the 2010 United States census, there were 49,462 people, 19,077 households, and 13,020 families residing in the county. The population density was 126.2 inhabitants per square mile (48.7/km^{2}). There were 21,288 housing units at an average density of 54.3 per square mile (21.0/km^{2}). The racial makeup of the county was 95.7% white, 2.2% black or African American, 0.3% Asian, 0.1% American Indian, 0.4% from other races, and 1.2% from two or more races. Those of Hispanic or Latino origin made up 1.4% of the population. In terms of ancestry, 19.9% were German, 13.3% were American, 11.8% were Irish, and 9.1% were English.

Of the 19,077 households, 31.2% had children under the age of 18 living with them, 52.1% were married couples living together, 11.6% had a female householder with no husband present, 31.8% were non-families, and 27.3% of all households were made up of individuals. The average household size was 2.43 and the average family size was 2.94. The median age was 41.4 years.

The median income for a household in the county was $47,697 and the median income for a family was $52,701. Males had a median income of $42,628 versus $30,226 for females. The per capita income for the county was $19,879. About 10.2% of families and 13.7% of the population were below the poverty line, including 20.0% of those under age 18 and 8.8% of those age 65 or over.

== Education ==
School districts include:

- Blue River Valley Schools
- Charles A. Beard Memorial School Corporation
- Nettle Creek School Corporation
- New Castle Community School Corporation
- Shenandoah School Corporation
- South Henry School Corporation
- Union School Corporation

== Recreation ==
- Summit Lake State Park
- Westwood Park

== Notable people ==
- Steve Alford, NCAA basketball coach and former player
- Kent Benson, Former NCAA and NBA basketball player
- Edward Black, Civil War soldier
- Omar Bundy, Major General, World War One
- Clessie Cummins, inventor
- John Charles Duncan, astronomer
- Thomas J. Graves, Medal of Honor recipient
- William Grose, Major General, Civil War
- Ira Hough, Medal of Honor recipient, 1864
- Robert Indiana, artist
- Arthur C. Mellette, first Governor of South Dakota
- Solomon Meredith, Major General, Civil War
- Edward E. Moore, Indiana state senator and Los Angeles City Council member
- Wilbur Wright, aviation pioneer
- William Zion, Medal of Honor recipient
- John M. Barrett, Free-Soiler and Abolitionist

== See also ==
- National Register of Historic Places listings in Henry County, Indiana
