= Blountsville, Indiana =

- Town
- Location of Blountsville in Henry County, Indiana.
- Coordinates: 40°03′35″N 85°14′18″W
- Country: United States
- State: Indiana
- County: Henry
- Township: Stoney Creek
- Founded: 1832

Area
  - Total: 0.12 sq mi (0.30 km^{2})
  - Land: 0.11 sq mi (0.29 km^{2})
  - Water: 0 sq mi (0.00 km^{2})
- Elevation: 1,089 ft (332 m)

Population (2020)
  - Total: 98
  - Estimate (2025): 97 ▼
  - Density: 890/sq mi (344/km^{2})
- Time zone: UTC-5 (EST)
  - Summer (DST): UTC-4 (EDT)
- ZIP code: 47354
- Area code: 765
- FIPS code: 18-05896
- GNIS ID: 2396594

Blountsville is a town in Stoney Creek Township, Henry County, Indiana, United States. The population was 98 at the 2020 census.

== History ==
Blountsville was laid out and platted in 1832, and named for one of its founders, Andrew D. Blount. A post office was established at Blountsville in 1835, and remained in operation until it was discontinued in 1964.

== Geography ==
According to the 2010 census, Blountsville has a total area of 0.11 square miles (0.28 km^{2}), all land.

== Demographics ==
Historical population
Census	Pop.	Note	%±
1870	178		—
1880	188		5.6%
1910	159		—
1920	153		−3.8%
1930	151		−1.3%
1940	169		11.9%
1950	229		35.5%
1960	218		−4.8%
1970	220		0.9%
1980	213		−3.2%
1990	155		−27.2%
2000	166		7.1%
2010	134		−19.3%
2020	98		−26.9%
2025 (est.)	97	▼	−1.0%
U.S. Decennial Census

=== 2020 Census ===
As of the census of 2020, there were 98 people, 46 households, and 25 families living in the town. The population density was 890.91 inhabitants per square mile (344.0/km^{2}). There were 53 housing units at an average density of 481.82 per square mile (186.0/km^{2}). The racial makeup of the county was 91.8% White, 0.1% African American, 0.3% Asian, and 0.4% from two or more races. Hispanic or Latino of any race were 0.3% of the population.

There were 53 households, 37.7% were married couples living together, 24.5% had a female householder with no husband present, 34.0% had a male householder with no wife present, and 3.8% were non-families. 58.5% of all households were made up of individuals. The average household size was 1.85 and the average family size was 2.12.

10.5% of the population had never been married. 46.1% of residents were married and not separated, 11.8% were widowed, and 31.6% were divorced.

The median age in the city was 55.8. 6.0% of residents were under the age of 5; 8.4% of residents were under the age of 18; 91.6% were age 18 or older; and 19.3% were age 65 or older. 22.4% of the population were veterans.

The only language spoken was English with 100.0% speaking it at home.

The median household income in Henry County was $39,792, 31.7% less than the median average for the state of Indiana. 16.9% of the population were in poverty, although none of the residents under the age of 18. The poverty rate for the town was 4.0% higher than that of the state. 20.5% of the population were disabled and 3.6% had no healthcare coverage. 36.1% of the population had attained a high school or equivalent degree, 4.2% had attended college but received no degree, 23.6% had attained an Associate's degree or higher, 2.8% had attained a Bachelor's degree or higher, and 5.6% had a graduate or professional degree. 27.7% had no degree. 48.7% of Blountsville residents were employed, working a mean of 32.4 hours per week. None of the Blountsville residents rented their as the homeownership rate was 100.0%. 7 housing units were vacant at a density of 63.64 square miles (164.8 km^{2}).

=== 2010 census ===
As of the 2010 census, there were 134 people, 49 households, and 39 families living in the town. The population density was 1,218.2 inhabitants per square mile (470.3/km^{2}). There were 60 housing units at an average density of 545.5 per square mile (210.6/km^{2}). The racial makeup of the town was 97.0% White and 3.0% from two or more races.

There were 49 households, of which 38.8% had children under the age of 18 living with them, 59.2% were married couples living together, 12.2% had a female householder with no husband present, 8.2% had a male householder with no wife present, and 20.4% were non-families. 20.4% of all households were made up of individuals, and 8.1% had someone living alone who was 65 years of age or older. The average household size was 2.73 and the average family size was 3.13.

The median age in the town was 38.3 years. 28.4% of residents were under the age of 18; 5.9% were between the ages of 18 and 24; 24.6% were from 25 to 44; 28.4% were from 45 to 64; and 12.7% were 65 years of age or older. The gender makeup of the town was 44.0% male and 56.0% female.

=== 2000 census ===
As of the 2000 census, there were 166 people, 61 households, and 50 families living in the town. The population density was 1,372.9 inhabitants per square mile (530.1/km^{2}). There were 61 housing units at an average density of 504.5 per square mile (194.8/km^{2}). The racial makeup of the town was 100.0% White.

There were 61 households, out of which 34.4% had children under the age of 18 living with them, 72.1% were married couples living together, 6.6% had a female householder with no husband present, and 16.4% were non-families. 14.8% of all households were made up of individuals, and 6.6% had someone living alone who was 65 years of age or older. The average household size was 2.72 and the average family size was 2.98.

In the town, the population was spread out, with 28.3% under the age of 18, 7.8% from 18 to 24, 25.3% from 25 to 44, 22.3% from 45 to 64, and 16.3% who were 65 years of age or older. The median age was 37 years. For every 100 females, there were 95.3 males. For every 100 females age 18 and over, there were 101.7 males.

The median income for a household in the town was $31,023, and the median income for a family was $31,000. Males had a median income of $32,500 versus $16,250 for females. The per capita income for the town was $11,382. About 10.4% of families and 8.9% of the population were below the poverty line, including none of those under the age of eighteen and 27.8% of those 65 or over.

== Life in the Community ==
The city was named after Andrew Blount, land-owner.

At one time Blountsville used to have its own school, a grain elevator (sitting along the railroad tracks). (While the railroad line is no longer in existence, the Cardinal Greenway uses the old trail bed as a biking and hiking trail. This trail is paved from Richmond, Indiana to Gaston, Indiana.)

Throughout the decades the community has had numerous churches:

- Blountsville Congregational Christian Church, 7746 E High St, Losantville, IN 47354 (Blountsville, IN)
- Blountsville Presbyterian Church (deeded land September 30, 1840), which later housed:
- Methodist Episcopal Church, 1857 (deeded land November 10, 1856)
- Blountsville Nazarene Church (arsonist burned July 26, 1998)
- Blountsville church of Christ, 8057 E. High St, Blountsville, IN (later Route 1, Losantville, IN 47354)

== Education ==
It is in the Union School Corporation. The comprehensive public secondary school of that district is Union Junior and High School.

== See also ==
- Rogersville, Indiana – a nearby village in Stoney Creek township
