= Elizabeth City, Indiana =

Unincorporated community in Indiana, U.S.

Coordinates: 39°52′01″N 85°35′13″W

Elizabeth City was a village in Wayne Township of Henry County, Indiana, in the United States, located 12.25 miles (19.71 km) south-west of New Castle and 6 miles (9.7 km) northwest of Knightstown.

Elizabeth City was laid out and platted by Robert Overman, originally from Pasquotank County, North Carolina, in 1838 and never grew beyond its original size of six blocks. He took the name from the Elizabeth City in his home county.

It had a general store run by brothers Elnathan and Thomas B. Wilkinson, who later moved to Knightstown. The village had a Methodist Evangelical church, organized in 1840 by Samuel Carr and run from his own house. It later moved to an old log school house, until a proper church building (costing US$1,200 (equivalent to $36,281 in 2025)) was erected in 1876. It had a local doctor named J. P. Julian from 1882, a Henry County native who had moved his medical practice there from Middletown, having graduated in medicine in March 1881 from the Physio-Medical College of Indiana and prior to that having been a schoolteacher for around five years.

When a post office was established in 1878, it was discovered that there was another post office called Elizabeth City in Indiana, and so the name Maple Valley was selected in order to avoid repetition. The first post master was A. F. Yetter. The Maple Valley post office was discontinued in 1903.

The village failed because of the construction of the railway that ran through Kennard, Shirley, and Wilkinson just a few miles away, and because of rural free delivery provided from Shirley and Wilkinson obviating the need for the Maple Valley post office.
