= Maple Valley Township, Buena Vista County, Iowa =

Township in Iowa, US

Maple Valley Township, Buena Vista County
- Township
- Coordinates: 42°36′20″N 095°20′08″W
- Country: United States
- State: Iowa
- County: Buena Vista

Area
  - Total: 36.11 sq mi (93.53 km^{2})
  - Land: 36.11 sq mi (93.53 km^{2})
  - Water: 0 sq mi (0 km^{2})
- Elevation: 1,348 ft (411 m)

Population (2000)
  - Total: 259
  - Density: 7.3/sq mi (2.8/km^{2})
- FIPS code: 19-92823
- GNIS feature ID: 0468343

Maple Valley Township is one of eighteen townships in Buena Vista County, Iowa, United States. As of the 2000 census, its population was 259.

== Geography ==
Maple Valley Township covers an area of 36.11 square miles (93.5 km^{2}) and contains no incorporated settlements. According to the USGS, it contains two cemeteries: Maple Valley and Saint John's Lutheran.
