= Mooreland, Indiana =

- Town
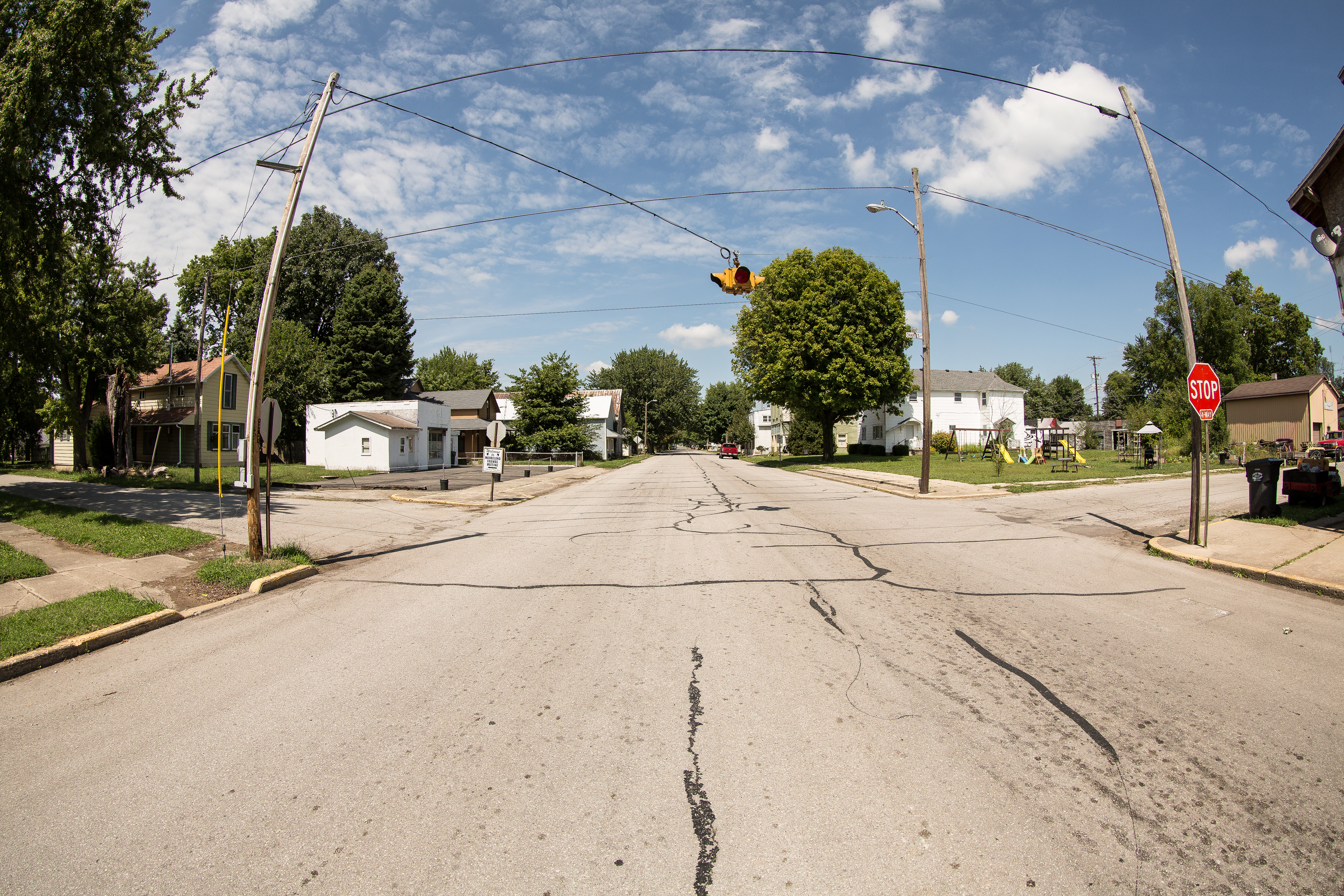

- Logo

- Location of Mooreland in Henry County, Indiana.
- Coordinates: 39°59′50″N 85°15′05″W
- Country: United States
- State: Indiana
- County: Henry
- Township: Blue River

Area
  - Total: 0.14 sq mi (0.37 km^{2})
  - Land: 0.14 sq mi (0.37 km^{2})
  - Water: 0 sq mi (0.00 km^{2})
- Elevation: 1,122 ft (342 m)

Population (2020)
  - Total: 335
  - Estimate (2025): 340 ▲
  - Density: 2,337.0/sq mi (902.31/km^{2})
- Time zone: UTC-5 (Eastern (EST))
  - Summer (DST): UTC-4 (EDT)
- ZIP code: 47360
- Area code: 765
- FIPS code: 18-50940
- GNIS feature ID: 2396778
- Website: www.townofmooreland.net

Mooreland is a town in Blue River Township, Henry County, Indiana, United States. The population was 335 at the 2020 census.

== History ==
Mooreland was platted in 1882 on farmland belonging to Miles M. Moore. A post office has been in operation in Mooreland since 1882.

== Geography ==
According to the 2010 census, Mooreland has a total area of 0.14 square miles (0.36 km^{2}), all land.

== Demographics ==
Historical population
Census	Pop.	Note	%±
1900	309		—
1910	455		47.2%
1920	404		−11.2%
1930	384		−5.0%
1940	496		29.2%
1950	497		0.2%
1960	477		−4.0%
1970	495		3.8%
1980	479		−3.2%
1990	465		−2.9%
2000	393		−15.5%
2010	375		−4.6%
2020	335		−10.7%
2025 (est.)	340	▲	1.5%
U.S. Decennial Census

=== 2010 census ===
As of the census of 2010, there were 375 people, 145 households, and 108 families living in the town. The population density was 2,678.6 inhabitants per square mile (1,034.2/km^{2}). There were 169 housing units at an average density of 1,207.1 per square mile (466.1/km^{2}). The racial makeup of the town was 97.3% White and 2.7% from two or more races. Hispanic or Latino of any race were 1.6% of the population.

There were 145 households, of which 43.4% had children under the age of 18 living with them, 56.6% were married couples living together, 13.1% had a female householder with no husband present, 4.8% had a male householder with no wife present, and 25.5% were non-families. 22.8% of all households were made up of individuals, and 10.4% had someone living alone who was 65 years of age or older. The average household size was 2.59 and the average family size was 3.05.

The median age in the town was 37.4 years. 29.6% of residents were under the age of 18; 6.2% were between the ages of 18 and 24; 27.4% were from 25 to 44; 27.5% were from 45 to 64; and 9.3% were 65 years of age or older. The gender makeup of the town was 45.1% male and 54.9% female.

=== 2000 census ===
As of the census of 2000, there were 393 people, 141 households, and 108 families living in the town. The population density was 2,800.5 inhabitants per square mile (1,081.3/km^{2}). There were 148 housing units at an average density of 1,054.7 per square mile (407.2/km^{2}). The racial makeup of the town was 99.49% White, and 0.51% from two or more races. Hispanic or Latino of any race were 1.78% of the population.

There were 141 households, out of which 41.1% had children under the age of 18 living with them, 64.5% were married couples living together, 9.2% had a female householder with no husband present, and 23.4% were non-families. 19.1% of all households were made up of individuals, and 5.7% had someone living alone who was 65 years of age or older. The average household size was 2.79 and the average family size was 3.20.

In the town, the population was spread out, with 32.6% under the age of 18, 7.1% from 18 to 24, 31.3% from 25 to 44, 18.6% from 45 to 64, and 10.4% who were 65 years of age or older. The median age was 30 years. For every 100 females, there were 90.8 males. For every 100 females age 18 and over, there were 90.6 males.

The median income for a household in the town was $35,556, and the median income for a family was $38,594. Males had a median income of $25,250 versus $21,875 for females. The per capita income for the town was $13,176. About 9.2% of families and 10.2% of the population were below the poverty line, including 15.4% of those under age 18 and 8.1% of those age 65 or over.

== Notable people ==
- Vern Huffman, All-American basketball and football player for Indiana University
- Haven Kimmel, author, novelist and poet.
- Wilbur Wright was born three miles south of Mooreland

== Mooreland Free Fair ==
Traditionally held during the first full week of August, the town hosts the Mooreland Free Fair. The event unofficially begins on that Sunday evening with a community worship service held at the fairgrounds at the south end of town (site of the former Mooreland School). The festivities kick off in full force on Monday with a midway full of food, games, amusement rides (courtesy of Poor Jack Amusements in Milton, Indiana), vendors, and entertainment. The fair runs through Saturday. The Mooreland Free Fair is the largest fair of its kind in Henry County and is a popular event during the summer.
