= National Register of Historic Places listings in Henry County, Indiana =

Location of Henry County in Indiana

This is a list of the National Register of Historic Places listings in Henry County, Indiana.

This is intended to be a complete list of the properties and districts on the National Register of Historic Places in Henry County, Indiana, United States. Latitude and longitude coordinates are provided for many National Register properties and districts; these locations may be seen together in a map.

There are 15 properties and districts listed on the National Register in the county.

Properties and districts located in incorporated areas display the name of the municipality, while properties and districts in unincorporated areas display the name of their civil township. Properties and districts split between multiple jurisdictions display the names of all jurisdictions.

This National Park Service list is complete through NPS recent listings posted August 29, 2025.

== Current listings ==
	Name on the Register	Image	Date listed	Location	City or town	Description
1	Chrysler Enclosure	Chrysler Enclosure	September 23, 1999 (#99001156)	Western side of Ross St. at Chrysler High School; 39°54′41″N 85°22′32″W	New Castle	
2	Gen. William Grose House	Gen. William Grose House	June 23, 1983 (#83000034)	614 S. 14th St. 39°55′33″N 85°22′09″W	New Castle	
3	Guyer Opera House	Guyer Opera House	December 6, 1979 (#79000018)	U.S. Route 40; 39°48′25″N 85°21′12″W	Lewisville	
4	John W. Hedrick House	John W. Hedrick House	December 27, 1984 (#84000491)	506 High St. 40°03′22″N 85°32′01″W	Middletown	
5	Henry County Courthouse	Henry County Courthouse	April 2, 1981 (#81000013)	Courthouse Sq. 39°55′51″N 85°22′16″W	New Castle	
6	Henry County Memorial Park	Henry County Memorial Park	August 26, 2020 (#100005504)	2221 North Memorial Dr. 39°56′45″N 85°23′18″W	New Castle	
7	Elias Hinshaw House	Elias Hinshaw House	May 3, 1984 (#84001045)	16 W. Main St. 39°47′43″N 85°31′42″W	Knightstown	
8	Knightstown Academy	Knightstown Academy	September 29, 1976 (#76000022)	Cary St. 39°48′00″N 85°31′29″W	Knightstown	
9	Knightstown Historic District	Knightstown Historic District	May 22, 1986 (#86001104)	Roughly bounded by Morgan, Adams, 3rd, and McCullum Sts. 39°47′46″N 85°31′38″W	Knightstown	
10	Middletown Commercial Historic District	Middletown Commercial Historic District	March 31, 2010 (#10000122)	Intersection of 5th and Locust Sts., stretching approximately 125 feet north and 180 feet south of Locust and one block west 40°03′15″N 85°32′00″W	Middletown	
11	New Castle Archeological Site	New Castle Archeological Site	April 26, 1976 (#76000023)	Grounds of the former New Castle State Hospital, southeast of the confluence of the Big and Little Blue Rivers, and northeast of New Castle; 39°57′20″N 85°21′06″W	Henry Township	
12	New Castle Commercial Historic District	New Castle Commercial Historic District	December 19, 1991 (#91001868)	Roughly bounded by Fleming and 11th Sts., Central Ave. and the Norfolk Southern railroad tracks 39°55′53″N 85°22′12″W	New Castle	
13	Old Knightstown and Glen Cove Cemeteries		June 4, 2019 (#100004046)	8875 S. State Rd. 109; 39°48′14″N 85°31′56″W	Knightstown	
14	Richsquare Friends Meetinghouse and Cemetery	Richsquare Friends Meetinghouse and Cemetery	April 19, 2006 (#06000305)	5685 S. 250E, north of Lewisville; 39°51′10″N 85°20′29″W	Franklin Township	
15	Henry F. Whitelock House and Farm	Henry F. Whitelock House and Farm	December 22, 1983 (#83003565)	State Road 38, north of Shirley; 39°57′46″N 85°32′37″W	Harrison Township	

== See also ==
- List of National Historic Landmarks in Indiana
- National Register of Historic Places listings in Indiana
- Listings in neighboring counties: Delaware, Fayette, Hancock, Madison, Randolph, Rush, Wayne
- List of Indiana state historical markers in Henry County
