= Middle Town, Isles of Scilly =

Middle Town, Isles of Scilly, may refer to two different settlements on two different islands within the Isles of Scilly:

- Middle Town, St Agnes
- Middle Town, St Martin's
