= Eastern Isles =

Island group in the Isles of Scilly

- Site of Special Scientific Interest
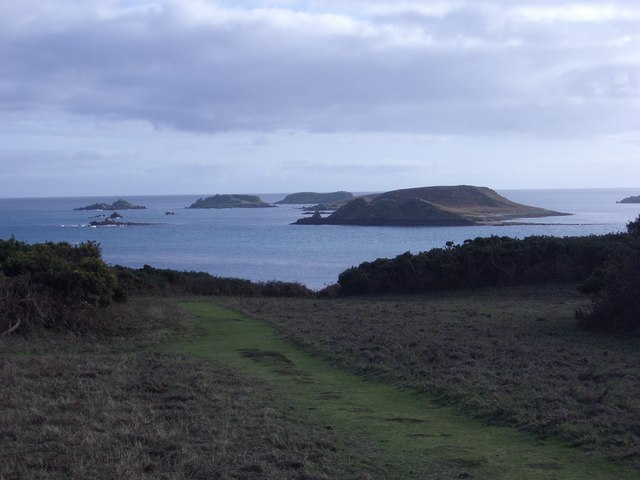
- View of a portion of the Eastern Isles

- Location within Isles of Scilly
- Location of Eastern Isles.
- Area of search: Cornwall
- Grid reference: SV947145
- Coordinates: 49.9517°N 6.2567°W
- Interest: Biological
- Area: 83.8 hectares (0.838 km^{2}; 0.324 sq mi)
- Notification date: 1971

The Eastern Isles (Cornish: Enesigow an Duryen) are a group of 12 small uninhabited islands within the Isles of Scilly Area of Outstanding Natural Beauty, part of the Scilly Heritage Coast and a Site of Special Scientific Interest (SSSI) first designated in 1971 for its flora and fauna. They have a long period of occupation from the Bronze Age with cairns and entrance graves through to Iron Age field systems and a Roman shrine on Nornour. Before the 19th century, the islands were known by their Cornish name, which had also become the name of the largest island in the group after the submergence of the connecting lands.

All of the land designated as Eastern Isles Site of Special Scientific Interest is owned by the Duchy of Cornwall.

== Geography ==
The islands are located to the south-east of St Martin's and are within the Isles of Scilly Area of Outstanding Natural Beauty and part of the Scilly Heritage Coast.

The Isles are not so exposed to gales as the Western Rocks; consequently, the soils do not receive so much salt spray, and remnant habitats such as coastal grassland and maritime heath have survived the inundation of the sea. If the practice of summer grazing had continued, there would be even more grassland instead of the dense bramble that has smothered some of the small growing plants.

The islands by area are:

- Great Ganilly 13.83 hectares (34.2 acres)
- Great, Middle, and Little Arthur 7.75 hectares (19.2 acres)
- Menawethan 2.81 hectares (6.9 acres)
- Little Ganilly 2.71 hectares (6.7 acres)
- Great Innisvouls 1.82 hectares (4.5 acres)
- Great Ganinick 1.82 hectares (4.5 acres)
- Nornour 1.64 hectares (4.1 acres)
- Little Ganinick 1.15 hectares (2.8 acres)
- Little Innisvouls 0.98 hectares (2.4 acres)
- Ragged Island 0.97 hectares (2.4 acres)
- Guther's 0.47 hectares (1.2 acres)
- Hanjague 0.30 hectares (0.74 acres)

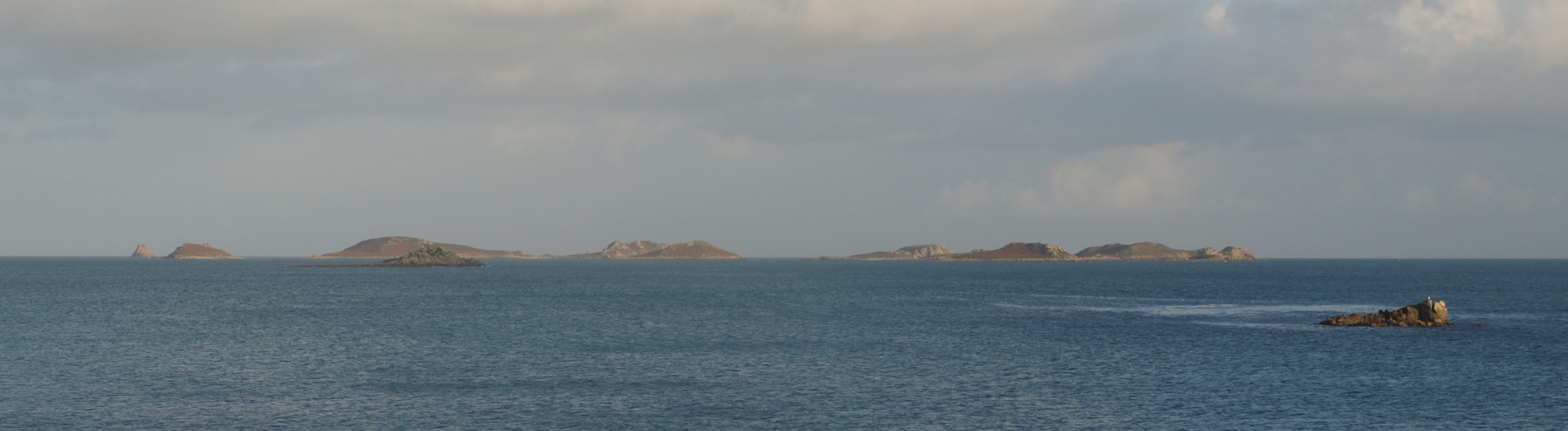
Eastern Isles seen from Pentle Bay, Tresco

== Geology ==
The underlying rock is coarse-grained Hercynian granite topped by wind-blown sand. Some of the islands are linked with boulder ridges and sandy bars; at low tide, they can appear to be one island. During the Roman occupation of England and Wales, the area was a low-lying plain between St Mary's and St Martins and the present Eastern Isles small hills. The Isles of Scilly are a Geological Conservation Review (GCR) site for the largest assemblage of tied islands outside of Orkney and Shetland. Four islands represent the different stages in the linkage of islands by a sandy bar or tombola: Teän (not part of the Eastern Isles) to the north-west, between St Martin's and Tresco; and Great Arthur, Great Ganinick, and Little Ganinick to the south-east of St Martin's.

== Wildlife and ecology ==
Most of the islands have dense cover of bramble (Rubus fruticosus) and bracken (Pteridium aquilinum) as well as grassland along the coastal fringes. Goldenrod (Solidago virgaurea) is locally abundant amongst the heath communities growing on the podzolic soils on the higher parts of the islands. The heaths are classified as a poor fit somewhere between H10 and H11; the heather (Calluna vulgaris), bell heather (Erica cinerea), and bracken merge into pure bracken on the lower slopes. A feasibility study is needed to decide if the vegetation would benefit from grazing through a Higher Level Stewardship (HLS) agreement. Because no botanist resides on the Isles, and recording plant species on remote islands is difficult, there have been few botanical surveys. The number of species for each of the Eastern Isles was finally published in 1971, based on surveys carried out by J.D. Grose, Mr & Mrs J.E. Dallas, and J.E. Lousley in 1938 and 1939. Lousley listed 111 species of higher plants in his 1971 Flora, and by 1999 further surveys recorded a similar number (114). Some of the islands have species found only on the island in question and not on the other Eastern Isles, such as an oak tree found by Mr and Mrs Dallas on Great Gannick. Possible ancient woodland indicators such as butcher's-broom (Ruscus aculeatus), wood spurge (Euphorbia amygdaloides), and wood small-reed (Calamagrostis epigejos) have also been recorded on Great Gannick. The nationally rare orange bird's-foot (Ornithopus pinnatus) is found on the northern side of Great Ganilly.

The Eastern Isles are one of three main grey seal (Halichoerus grypus) pupping areas, the Western Rocks and Norrard Rocks being the others. Four other mammals have been recorded: rabbit, brown rat (described as a plague on some of the Eastern Isles,) house mouse, and the so-called Scilly shrew.

The isles are also home to breeding colonies of eight species of seabird, including three species of gull, as well as the common shag (Phalacrocorax aristotelis), great cormorant (Phalacrocorax carbo), northern fulmar (Fulmarus glacialis), razorbill (Alca torda), and puffin (Fratercula arctica). Several of the isles are closed to visitors during the birds' breeding season (15 April to 20 August).

== The islands ==
=== Great Ganilly ===
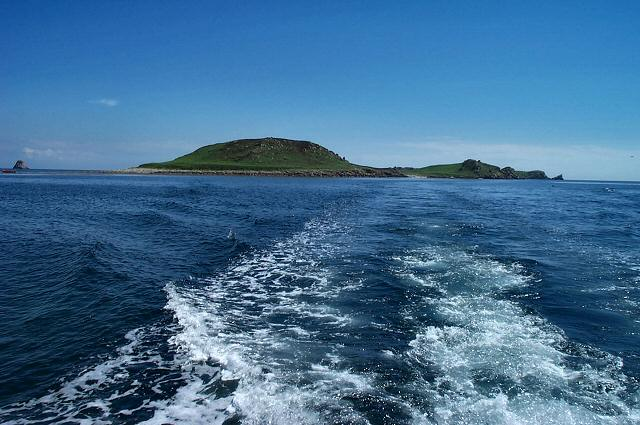
Great Ganilly

Great Ganilly (Cornish: Goonhyli Veur, lit. 'great saltwater downs') (grid reference SV947145), is the largest of the Eastern Isles and consists of two hills joined by a low sandy neck. The hill further to the north has the highest point at 34 metres (112 ft) and a ruined Bronze Age entrance grave on the summit. Stones from the chamber have been used to make a pyramidal navigational marker. Other evidence of past occupation include a hut circle on the neck as well as the remains of field systems. A freshwater spring would have made living possible on the island during the kelp burning season. The hills have maritime heath on each summit and dense bracken communities on the lower slopes. The surveys of 1938 and 1939 recorded a total of 74 plant species, the largest number on any of the Eastern Isles, including Portland spurge (Euphorbia portlandica), sea spurge (Euphorbia paralias), sea-kale (Crambe maritima), and balm-leaved figwort (Scrophularia scorodonia) in the small sand dune system. Common thyme (Thymus vulgaris) and orange bird's-foot grow on the heath, which is dominated by bell heather. Betony (Stachys officinalis), a common plant in Cornwall but known to be in only two places in Scilly, was discovered simultaneously here and on Tresco in 1998 but was not seen in 2000. Mammals recorded are the rabbit, brown rat, house mouse, and Scilly shrew.

=== Great, Middle, and Little Arthur ===
The Arthurs (grid reference SV942137), part of the Geological Conservation Review site (GCR), are three rocky islands joined by two beaches forming a crescent around Arthur Porth; compare with Great Ganinick and Little Ganinick (see below) where the process is ongoing. Great Arthur (Cornish: Arthur Meur), as the name suggests, is the largest; it has a fringe of maritime grassland, dune vegetation, and strandline vegetation. There are three entrance graves on the summit ridge connected by a prehistoric boulder wall and surrounded by maritime heath with English stonecrop (Sedum anglicum) on the bare areas. The area of blown sand is dominated by marram grass (Ammophila arenaria), which helps stabilise the dunes and shelter a relatively rich flora of non-maritime plants such as stunted grey sallow (Salix cinerea). This (probably the same) plant is recorded in both Louseley (1971) and Parslow (1997).

Middle Arthur (Cornish: Arthur Kres) has an unusual boat-shaped entrance grave on the summit with walls of standing slabs. A ceramic burial urn together with pieces of bone and flint were found during excavations in 1953. The island has a few patches of heather and some strandline vegetation in the sheltered areas of its shore; Little Arthur (Cornish: Arthur Byghan) has bracken on the deeper soils, heath on the summit, and English stonecrop in the bare areas. Also on Little Arthur is a small area of strandline vegetation and sand dunes with slender St John's-wort (Hypericum pulchrum), a plant common in Cornwall but uncommon in the Isles of Scilly.

=== Menawethan ===
Menawethan (Cornish: Men an Wedhen, lit. 'the tree stone') (grid reference SV954137) is a steep-sided island to the south-east of the group with vegetation that is typical of islands with breeding seabirds. It was one of the first islands where Natural England carried out rat eradication. Some areas are covered in hottentot fig (Carpobrotus edulis; probably carried to the island by gulls); thrift (Armeria) and sea campion (Silene uniflora) also dominate in some areas. Other species recorded include Yorkshire fog (Holcus lanatus), orache (Atriplex), common scurvy-grass (Cochlearia officinalis), and tree-mallow (Malva assurgentiflora), which forms temporary stands in some years. Brookweed (Samolus valerandi), a plant restricted to cliff flushes in Cornwall and an unusual plant in Scilly, grows among rocks above the shore. The rocky shore is used by grey seals for haul-outs. A Bronze Age cairn stands on the summit. The island is recorded as Mynangwython c. 1588.

A cargo ship for the Isles of Scilly Steamship Company, due to enter service in 2026, has been named after the island.

=== Little Ganilly ===
Little Ganilly (Cornish: Goonhyli Vyghan, lit. 'little saltwater down') (grid reference SV938142) is just to the north of Little Arthur and has a small area of heath on the summit. Bracken dominates the slopes, and there are maritime grassland and cliff communities along the coast, which has several small caves on the east side. Surveys in 1938 and 1939 recorded 37 species of plants. The only mammals recorded are brown rats and grey seals, the latter of which use the island for haul-outs.

=== Great Innisvouls and Little Innisvouls ===
Great Innisvouls (Cornish: Enys Vols Meur, great wether island) (grid reference SV953141), has a small area of maritime grassland and bracken, and Little Innisvouls (Cornish: Enys Vols Bian, little wether island) (grid reference SV955142) has strandline plant species. Both have breeding seabirds, and the Scilly shrew has been recorded on Great Innisvouls. Gurney reported 12 pairs of European shag (Gulosus aristotelis) with egg and one pair with young on Great Innisvouls on 12 May 1887.

To the north-east of Little Innisvouls is a small rock called Mouls (Cornish: Mols, lit. 'wether (sheep)') (grid reference SV957144), where a nationally scarce pseudoscorpion (Neobisium maritimum) was found in 1927.

=== Great Ganinick and Little Ganinick ===
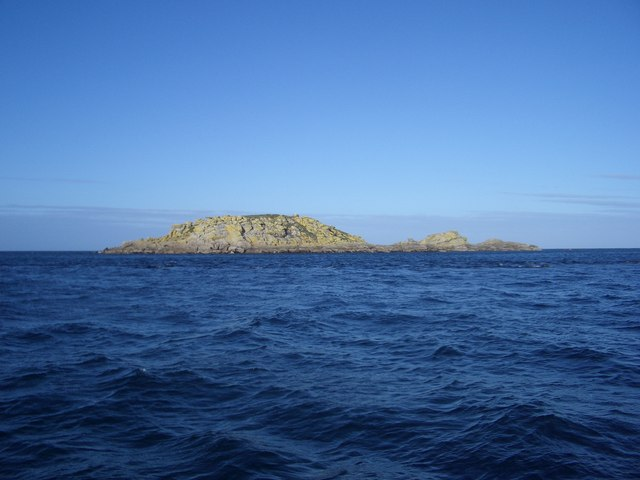
Great Ganinick and Little Ganinick

The islands of Great Ganinick and Little Ganinick (Cornish: Keninek, place of wild garlic) (grid reference SV933139), are part of the GCR and are in an early stage of the linkage of two islands by a tombola. The sand bar is building northwards from Little Ganinick towards the larger island, although the sand supply does not appear to be sufficient to link the two islands. On the north side of Great Ganinick, a cuspate-shaped beach is forming. Great Ganinick has the only known oak tree in the Eastern Islands. Described by Mr and Mrs Dallas in 1938 as ".... about 2 ft 6in (0.76 m) tall in tangle of bracken, bramble, and honeysuckle" (Lonicera), the tree (or possibly one like it) was still there in 1997. Great Ganinick is rich in plant species; Lousley recorded 74 species, including butcher's-broom, wood spurge, wood small-reed (Calamagrostis epigejos), and white ramping fumitory (Fumaria capreolata). Little Ganinick has grassland with strandline vegetation and seabird colonies.

=== Nornour ===
Nornour (Cornish: Ar Nor, facing the mainland) (grid reference SV944148), consists of one hill covered in bracken to the north of Great Ganilly and joined to it at low tide by a boulder causeway. There was a long period of habitation during the Bronze and Iron Ages, when Nornour would have been part of a larger island. After a storm in 1962, the erosion of sand dunes uncovered hut circles, leading to the discovery of 11 circular stone buildings. Excavations of the site in 1962–66 and 1969–73 turned up such features as doorways, dividing walls, steps, hearths, querns, and stone-lined pits. Two of the buildings have since disappeared under beach boulders. Among the numerous Roman finds found in the two westernmost huts were more than 300 brooches, dating from the later first to the later 3rd century AD. They were found in the upper layers of two of the prehistoric buildings, along with coins (late 1st to late 4th century), glass, miniature pots, and pieces of small clay Gallic figurines. The earliest coins are from Vespasian (AD 69–79); the later-dated ones show that the site remained in use into the late 4th century. Analysis of the brooches indicate they came from numerous places in Britain and Continental Europe. The lack of comparable sites on Scilly suggests that these finds were not items of trade but perhaps votive offerings to a local deity, indicating that the site was a shrine. Sulis has been suggested as its tutelary deity. With dates ranging over four centuries, it is unlikely that the objects came from a shipwreck. Despite attempts to protect the archaeological site, sea erosion still occurs.

The boilers of the paddle steamer Earl of Arran can be seen at low tide on the western shore. She hit Irishman's Ledge (grid reference SV947149) on 16 July 1872, when the Captain attempted to take a short cut through English Island Neck.

There is a small area of heath on the hill with heather and bell heather and in the disturbed area around the hut circles. The nationally scarce plants Portland spurge and balm-leaved figwort have been recorded on Nornour, as have butcher's-broom, sea spurge, and sea spleenwort (Asplenium marinum). An endangered shore dock (Rumex rupestris) colony was recorded by Lousley but has not been seen since 1970.

=== Ragged Island ===
Ragged Island (grid reference SV946138) has two unexpected plants: Chilean hard-fern (Blechnum cordatum) and borage (Borago officinalis). Neither species was recorded by Lousley in his 1971 Flora. While how they got there is not known, spores from ferns can be blown some distance; Chilean hard-fern was recorded in Higher Town, St Martin's in 1936. Other species recorded include thrift, scurvy grass, hastate orache, and sea beet.

=== Guther's ===
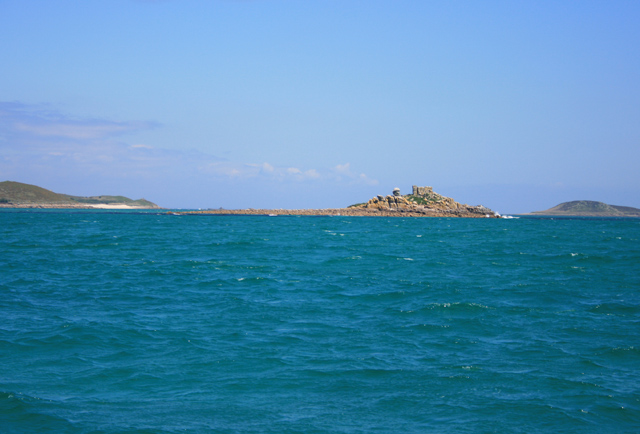
Guther's Island

Guther's (or Gunther's) (Cornish: An Gudhys) (grid reference SV918144), is a small island that lies on the western side of the Eastern Isles and south of St Martin's. It has limited vegetation consisting of grass, docks, and sea beet. Greater black-backed (Larus marinus) and herring (Larus argentatus) gulls nest there, as do common shags. One can walk out to this island from St Martin's at exceptional low tides, but great care must be taken not to be cut off.

=== Hanjague ===
Hanjague (Cornish: Henjek) (grid reference SV957150) is a sea stack approximately 1 km north-east of Great Gannilly and is the easternmost island in the archipelago. The island has no vegetation and is used as a roost by birds.

=== English Island ===
The rock is between English Island point, St Martin's to the north, and Nornour to the south-east (grid reference SV939149).

== See also ==
- List of islands
- List of shipwrecks of the Isles of Scilly
