= Middle Town =

Middle Town may refer to:

- Middle Town, California, United States
- Middle Town, St Agnes - a settlement on the island of St Agnes in the Isles of Scilly, of the English coast
- Middle Town, St Martin's - a settlement on the island of St Martin's in the Isles of Scilly, of the English coast
- Szczecin-Srodmiescie, Poland ("Middle Town" in Polish)

== See also ==
- Middletown (disambiguation)
