= Middle Town, St Martin's =

Coordinates: 49.966°N 6.2955°W

Middle Town: Cornish: Tregres
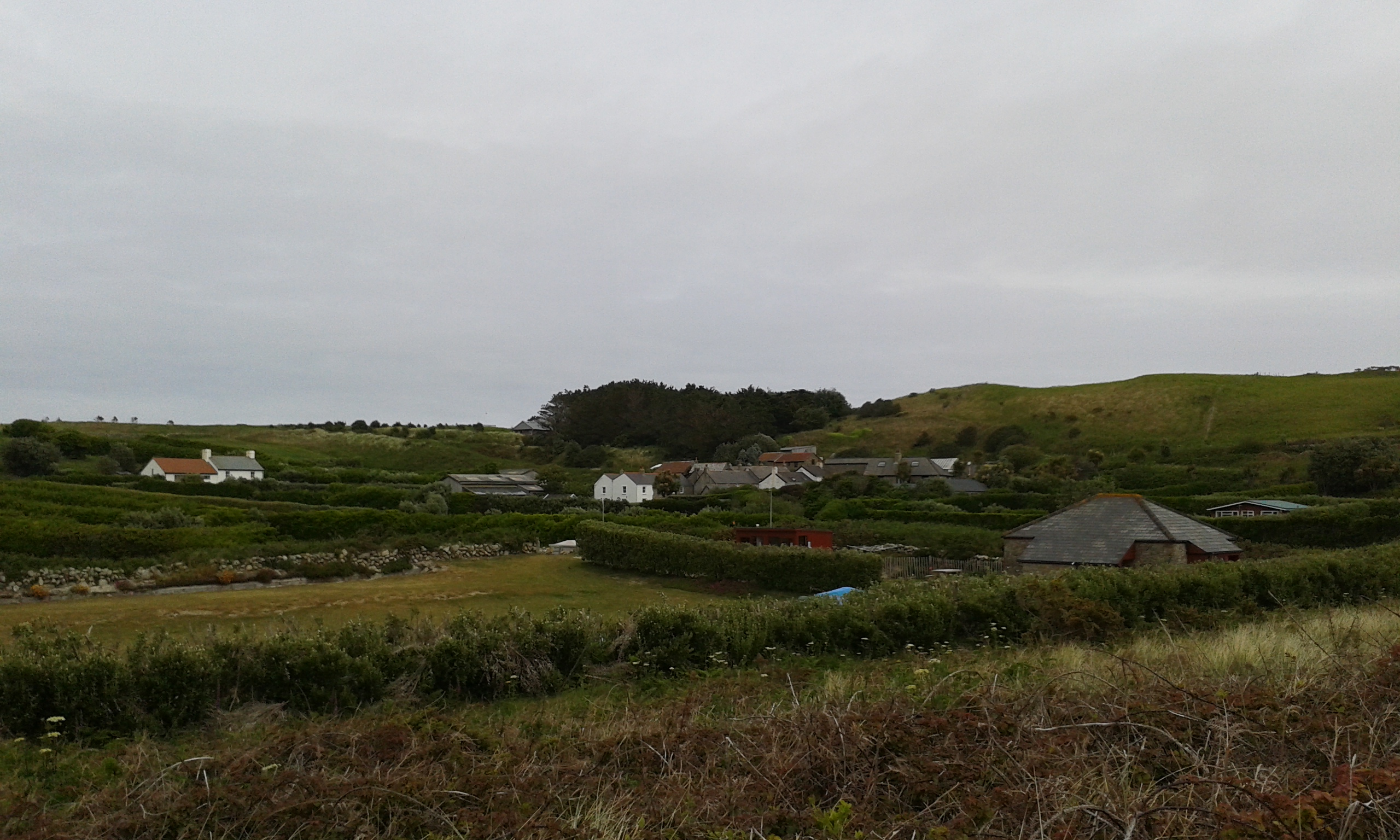
- Middle Town, viewed from the sand dunes by the coast; the campsite is in the foreground.

- Location within Isles of Scilly
- Unitary authority: Isles of Scilly
- Ceremonial county: Cornwall
- Region: South West
- Country: England
- Sovereign state: United Kingdom
- Post town: ISLES OF SCILLY
- Postcode district: TR25
- Dialling code: 01720
- Police: Devon and Cornwall
- Fire: Isles of Scilly
- Ambulance: South Western
- UK Parliament: St Ives

Middle Town (Cornish: Tregres) is a small settlement on the island of St Martin's in the Isles of Scilly, England. It is situated slightly inland, approximately 0.4 miles (0.64 km) east of Lower Town Quay, and on the road between the larger settlements of Lower Town and Higher Town. There is a campsite between Middle Town and the nearest coast, which is generally to its south.
