= Middletown =

Middletown may refer to:

== Places ==
=== Ireland ===
- Middletown, a townland south of Courtown in County Wexford

=== United Kingdom ===
- Middletown, County Armagh, Northern Ireland, a village
- Middlestown, Wakefield, West Yorkshire, England
- Middletown, Powys, a small village in Trewern, Powys, Wales

=== United States ===
- Middletown, California, a census-designated place in Lake County
  - Middletown, San Diego, California neighborhood
- Middletown, Connecticut
- Middletown, Delaware
- Middletown, Illinois
- Middletown, Indiana
  - Middletown, Shelby County, Indiana
  - Prairie Creek, Indiana, also known as Middletown
- Middletown, Iowa
- Middletown, Kentucky
- Middletown, Maryland
- Middletown, Michigan
- Middletown, Missouri
- Middletown Township, New Jersey, referred to as "Middletown"
- Middletown, New York (disambiguation), several places
- Middletown, Ohio, in Butler County
  - Middletown, Champaign County, Ohio
  - Middletown, Crawford County, Ohio
- Middletown, Dauphin County, Pennsylvania
- Middletown, Northampton County, Pennsylvania
- Middletown, Rhode Island
- Middletown, Virginia
- Middletown Township (disambiguation), several locations

== Film, television, and stage ==
- Middletown, 1982 television documentary series created and produced by Peter Davis
- Middletown, 1996 American film by Philip Botti featuring the Evil Clown of Middletown
- Middletown, 2006 Irish film by Brian Kirk, see 4th Irish Film & Television Awards
- Middletown, a 2010 play by Will Eno that played off-Broadway

== Other ==
- Middletown station (disambiguation), stations of the name
- "Middletown Dreams", song by Rush

== See also ==
- Middletown studies, the 1929 and 1937 sociological case studies of Muncie, Indiana, given the pseudonym of "Middletown America"
- Middleton (disambiguation)
- Middle Town (disambiguation)
