= Lower Town, Isles of Scilly =

Coordinates: 49.96521°N 6.30204°W

Lower Town: Cornish: Trewoles
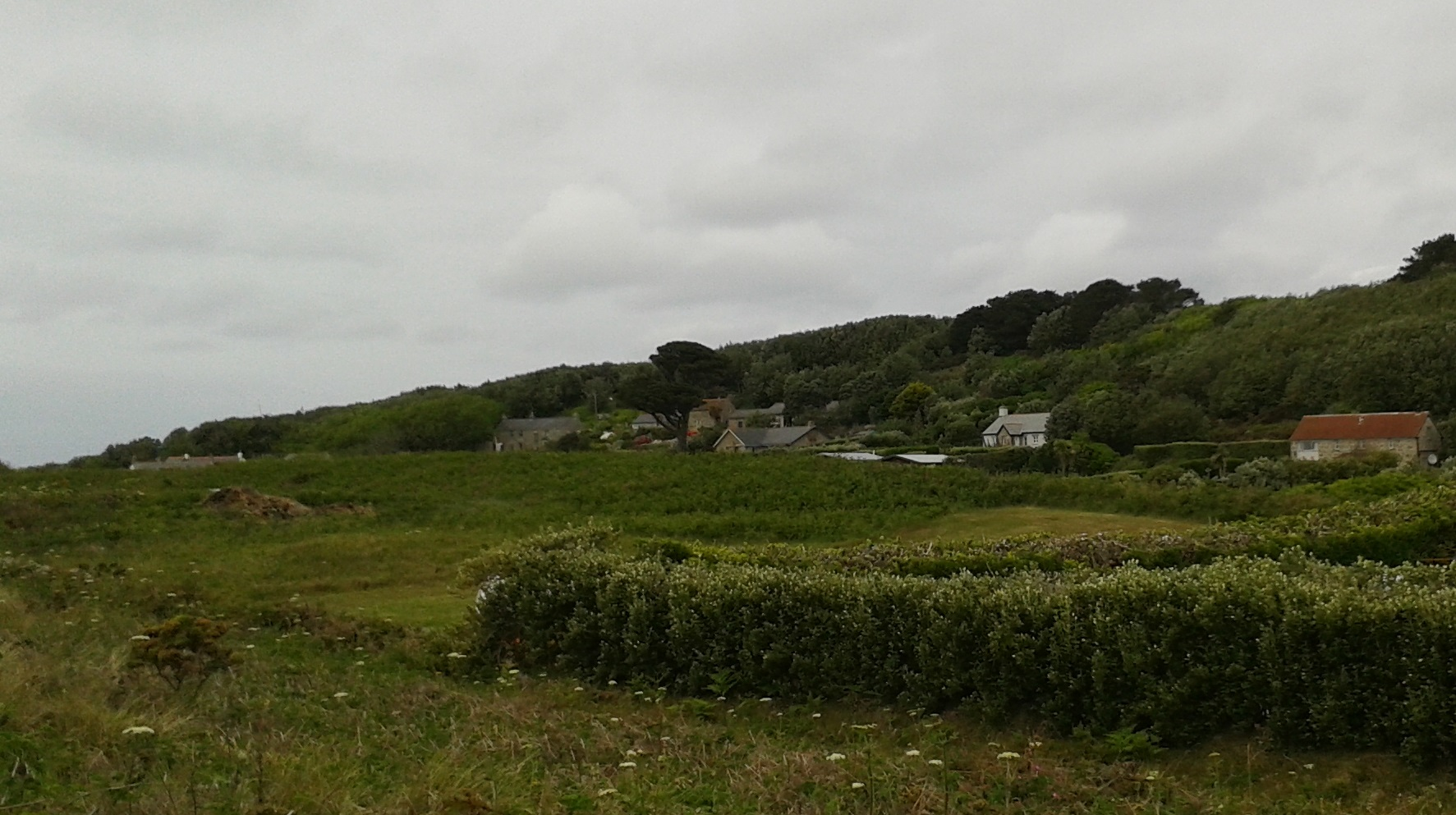
- Lower Town viewed from the southeast

- Location within Isles of Scilly
- OS grid reference: SV915161
- Unitary authority: Isles of Scilly
- Ceremonial county: Cornwall
- Region: South West
- Country: England
- Sovereign state: United Kingdom
- Post town: ISLES OF SCILLY
- Postcode district: TR25
- Dialling code: 01720
- Police: Devon and Cornwall
- Fire: Isles of Scilly
- Ambulance: South Western
- UK Parliament: St Ives

Lower Town (Cornish: Trewoles) is the westernmost settlement on the island of St Martin's in the Isles of Scilly, England.

One of the island's two quays is located here, sometimes referred to as the Hotel Quay, as the only hotel on the island, Karma St Martin's, is located by it. Lower Town also has the island's only pub, The Seven Stones.

The settlement is largely built on the hillside of Tinkler's Hill. The quay is located by Teän Sound.

== St Agnes ==
There is also a small settlement called Lower Town on the island of St Agnes. It contains the island's church (St Agnes' Church), community hall and sports facilities. In addition to Lower Town, St. Martin's has two other settlements called Higher Town and Middle Town.
