= Middletown station =

Middletown station may refer to:

- Middletown station (Pennsylvania), an Amtrak station in Middletown, Pennsylvania
- Middletown (NJT station), in Middletown, New Jersey
- Middletown (San Diego Trolley station), in San Diego
- Middletown (Erie Railroad station), a former station in Middletown, New York
- Middletown–Town of Wallkill (Metro-North station), or Middletown station, in Middletown, New York
- Middletown Road (IRT Pelham Line), a New York City Subway station
- Wawa Station, a SEPTA Regional Rail station in Middletown Township, Pennsylvania that was briefly referred to as Middletown station

== See also ==
- Middletown (disambiguation)
