= Cadiz, Indiana =

- Town
- Location of Cadiz in Henry County, Indiana.
- Coordinates: 39°57′03″N 85°29′13″W
- Country: United States
- State: Indiana
- County: Henry
- Township: Harrison

Area
  - Total: 0.14 sq mi (0.37 km^{2})
  - Land: 0.14 sq mi (0.37 km^{2})
  - Water: 0 sq mi (0.00 km^{2})
- Elevation: 1,089 ft (332 m)

Population (2020)
  - Total: 163
  - Estimate (2025): 164 ▲
  - Density: 1,128.9/sq mi (435.88/km^{2})
- Time zone: UTC-5 (EST)
  - Summer (DST): UTC-4 (EDT)
- ZIP code: 47362
- Area code: 765
- FIPS code: 18-09712
- GNIS feature ID: 2396622
- Website: Official website

Cadiz is a town in Harrison Township, Henry County, Indiana, United States. The population was 163 at the 2020 census.

== History ==
Cadiz was laid out and platted in 1836, and named after Cadiz, Ohio, the former home of many of the early settlers. A post office was established at Cadiz in 1837, and remained in operation until it was discontinued in 1923.

== Geography ==
According to the 2010 census, Cadiz has a total area of 0.16 square miles (0.41 km^{2}), all land.

== Demographics ==
Historical population
Census	Pop.	Note	%±
1880	594		—
1890	307		−48.3%
1900	253		−17.6%
1910	209		−17.4%
1920	148		−29.2%
1930	165		11.5%
1940	182		10.3%
1950	222		22.0%
1960	198		−10.8%
1970	207		4.5%
1980	180		−13.0%
1990	202		12.2%
2000	161		−20.3%
2010	150		−6.8%
2020	163		8.7%
2025 (est.)	164	▲	0.6%
U.S. Decennial Census

=== 2010 census ===
As of the census of 2010, there were 150 people, 51 households, and 37 families living in the town. The population density was 937.5 inhabitants per square mile (362.0/km^{2}). There were 56 housing units at an average density of 350.0 per square mile (135.1/km^{2}). The racial makeup of the town was 100.0% White. Hispanic or Latino of any race were 2.7% of the population.

There were 51 households, of which 45.1% had children under the age of 18 living with them, 54.9% were married couples living together, 7.8% had a female householder with no husband present, 9.8% had a male householder with no wife present, and 27.5% were non-families. 19.6% of all households were made up of individuals, and 3.9% had someone living alone who was 65 years of age or older. The average household size was 2.94 and the average family size was 3.30.

The median age in the town was 35.2 years. 32% of residents were under the age of 18; 7.4% were between the ages of 18 and 24; 30% were from 25 to 44; 24% were from 45 to 64; and 6.7% were 65 years of age or older. The gender makeup of the town was 48.7% male and 51.3% female.

=== 2000 census ===
As of the census of 2000, there were 161 people, 51 households, and 41 families living in the town. The population density was 1,106.9 inhabitants per square mile (427.4/km^{2}). There were 55 housing units at an average density of 378.1 per square mile (146.0/km^{2}). The racial makeup of the town was 93.79% White, 3.73% Asian, 2.48% from other races. Hispanic or Latino of any race were 2.48% of the population.

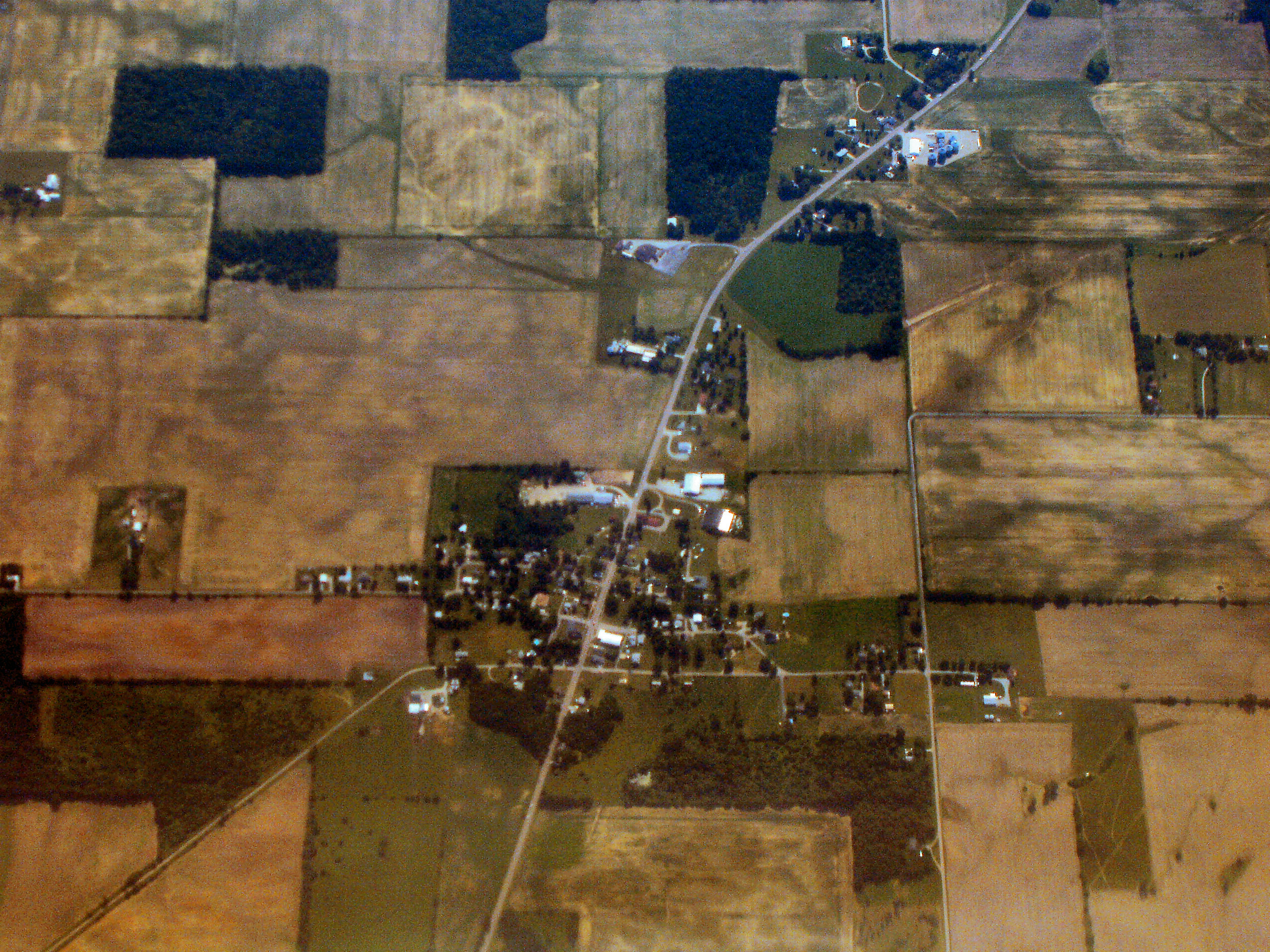
Cadiz from the air, looking east.

There were 51 households, out of which 41.2% had children under the age of 18 living with them, 56.9% were married couples living together, 17.6% had a female householder with no husband present, and 19.6% were non-families. 11.8% of all households were made up of individuals, and 7.8% had someone living alone who was 65 years of age or older. The average household size was 3.16 and the average family size was 3.29.

In the town, the population was spread out, with 26.1% under the age of 18, 16.1% from 18 to 24, 31.1% from 25 to 44, 16.8% from 45 to 64, and 9.9% who were 65 years of age or older. The median age was 33 years. For every 100 females, there were 106.4 males. For every 100 females age 18 and over, there were 120.4 males.

The median income for a household in the town was $42,813, and the median income for a family was $44,000. Males had a median income of $27,083 versus $22,500 for females. The per capita income for the town was $12,013. About 10.5% of families and 13.1% of the population were below the poverty line, including 4.9% of those under the age of eighteen and 55.6% of those 65 or over.
