= Great Ganilly =

Island in the Isles of Scilly, Cornwall, England

Goonhyli Veur
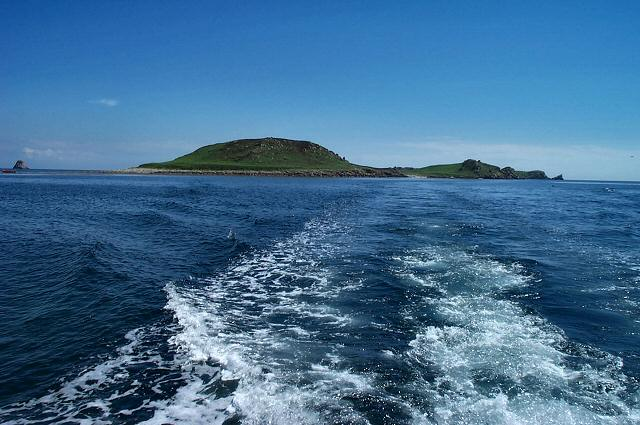
- Great Ganilly

- Location within Isles of Scilly

Geography
- Coordinates: 49.9517°N 6.2567°W
- OS grid reference: SV947145
- Archipelago: Isles of Scilly
- Area: 0.05 sq mi (0.13 km^{2})

Administration
- United Kingdom
- Civil parish: St Martin's

Demographics
- Population: 0

Great Ganilly (/ɡəˈnɪli/ gə-NIL-ee; Cornish: Goonhyli Veur, lit. 'great saltwater downs') is one of the Eastern Isles of the Isles of Scilly. It has a maximum total area of 0.13 square kilometres and a highest point of 34 metres above sea level, located in the middle of the island. There are two known cairns near the summit.
