= St Martin's, Isles of Scilly =

Island off Cornwall, England

Coordinates: 49.964°N 6.289°W

St Martin's: Cornish: Breghyek
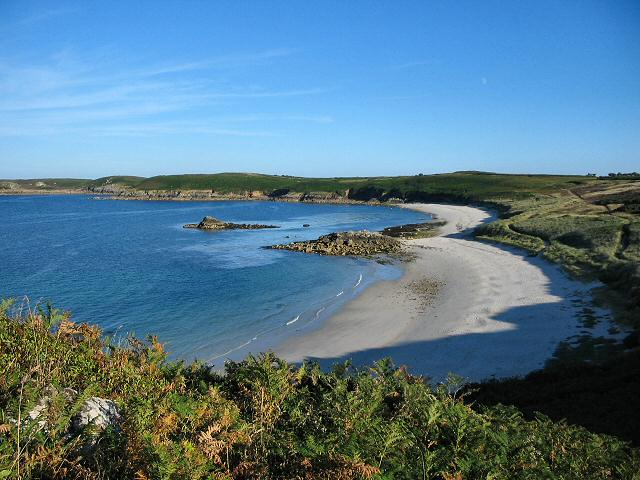
- Great Bay on the north coast

- Location within Isles of Scilly
- Population: 135 (2021)
- OS grid reference: SV 925 159
- Civil parish: St Martin's
- Unitary authority: Isles of Scilly
- Ceremonial county: Cornwall
- Region: South West
- Country: England
- Sovereign state: United Kingdom
- Post town: ISLES OF SCILLY
- Postcode district: TR25
- Dialling code: 01720
- Police: Devon and Cornwall
- Fire: Isles of Scilly
- Ambulance: South Western
- UK Parliament: St Ives

St Martin's (Cornish: Breghyek, lit. 'dappled island') is the northernmost populated island of the Isles of Scilly, Cornwall, England, United Kingdom. It has an area of 237 hectares (0.92 sq mi) and a total population (2021 census) of 135. Four regions of the island are designated as Sites of Special Scientific Interest.

== Description ==
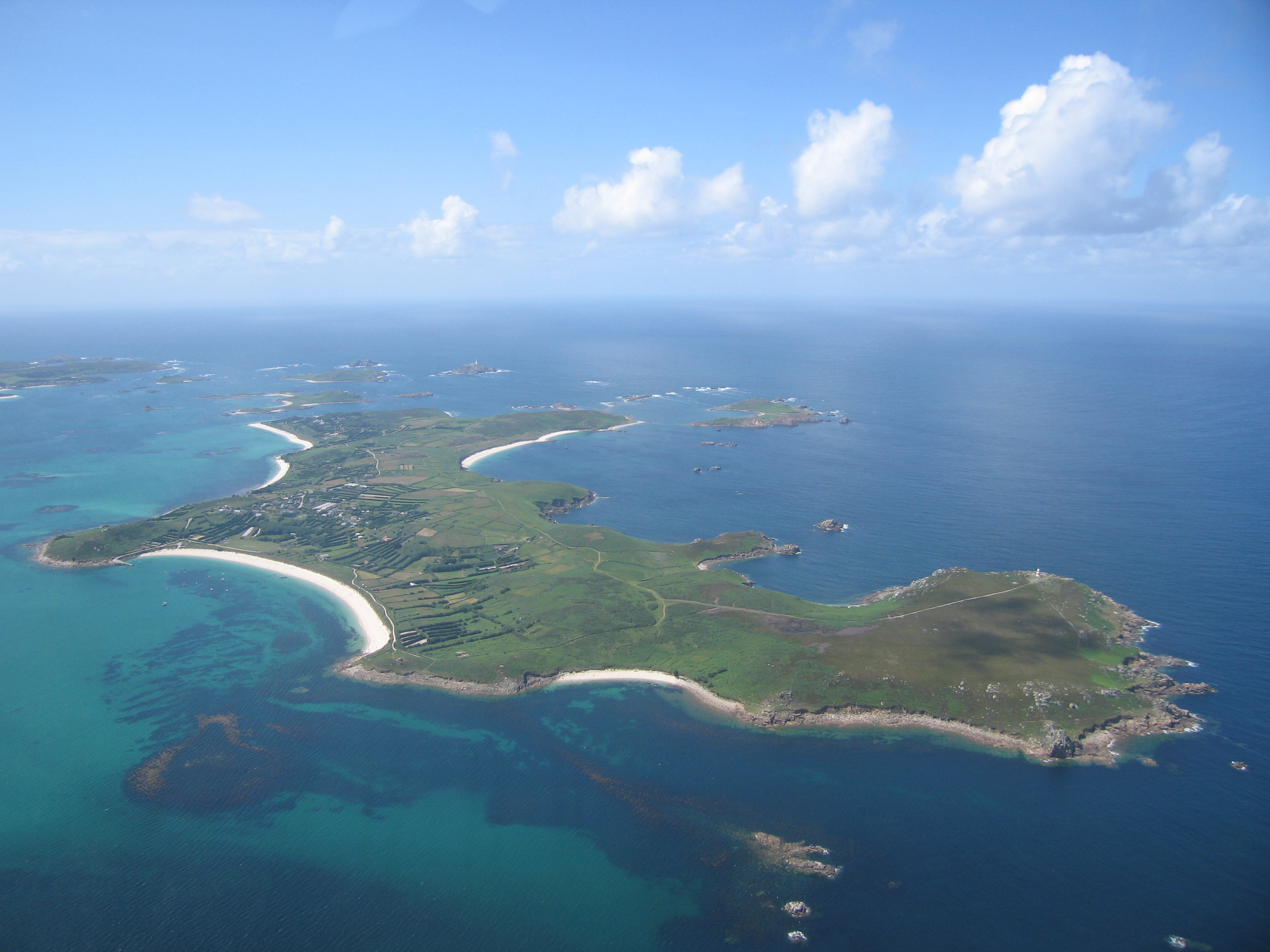
Aerial photograph of St Martin's with Higher Town and daymark located to the left and right of the foreground respectively

There are three main settlements on the island - Higher Town, Middle Town and Lower Town - in addition to a number of scattered farms and cottages.

There are two quays - at Higher Town (the Higher Town Quay, used at high tide) and at Lower Town (the Hotel Quay, used at low tide). In Higher Town there is also a general store and post office, a bakery, a bistro, a fish and chip restaurant and a commercial vineyard. At Lower Town, there is also a hotel, a public house and a silversmith and jeweler.

In addition, St Martin's has a community observatory, which is situated between Middle Town and Higher Town. The night sky on the island is rated as class 1 on the Bortle scale, which means it has very minimal light pollution and is possibly the best place in England to view the Milky Way.

To the north, St Martin's is joined by a tidal causeway to the uninhabited White Island, which is itself another Site of Special Scientific Interest.

== Daymark ==
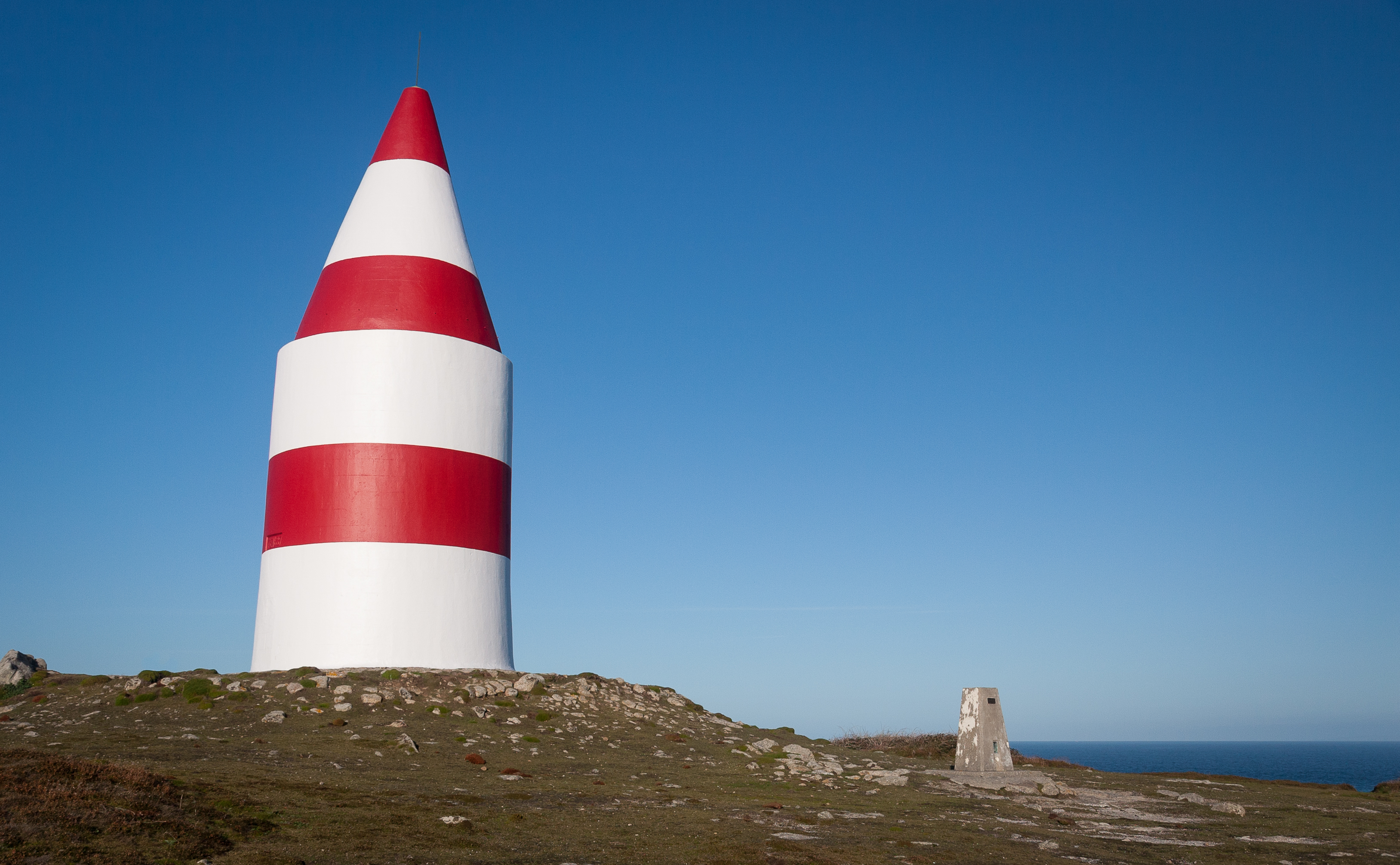
The daymark on St Martin's

At the northeast corner of the island is a large red-and-white daymark. It was erected in 1683 by Thomas Ekins, first steward of the Godophin Family to live on the islands. The 'Daymark', alongside several nearby prehistoric cairns, are all registered scheduled monuments.

Daymark is a rendered granite circular tower 4.8 metres (16 ft) in diameter and 6.4 metres (21 ft) high, set back to conical termination making it 11 metres (36 ft) high. The blocked arched entrance door contains an incorrect date of 1637. Daymark was painted white until 1822 but by 1833, it had been painted red. However, for much of the remainder of its history, Daymark has been painted in alternating bands of red and white.

Daymark is built on the highest point of St Martin's — and the second-highest point in the Isles of Scilly — and the islands' only Ordnance Survey triangulation station is situated by Daymark. The relative position and height of this location means that in good weather, the Cornish mainland is visible from Daymark and reciprocally, Daymark is visible and identifiable from Lands End on the Cornish mainland.

== Religion ==
There are two churches on St Martin's: the Anglican parish church of St Martin's and St Martin's Methodist Church, both located in the Higher Town area. The Methodist chapel dates from about 1845 and is part of the Isles of Scilly Methodist Circuit.

== Civil parish and ward ==
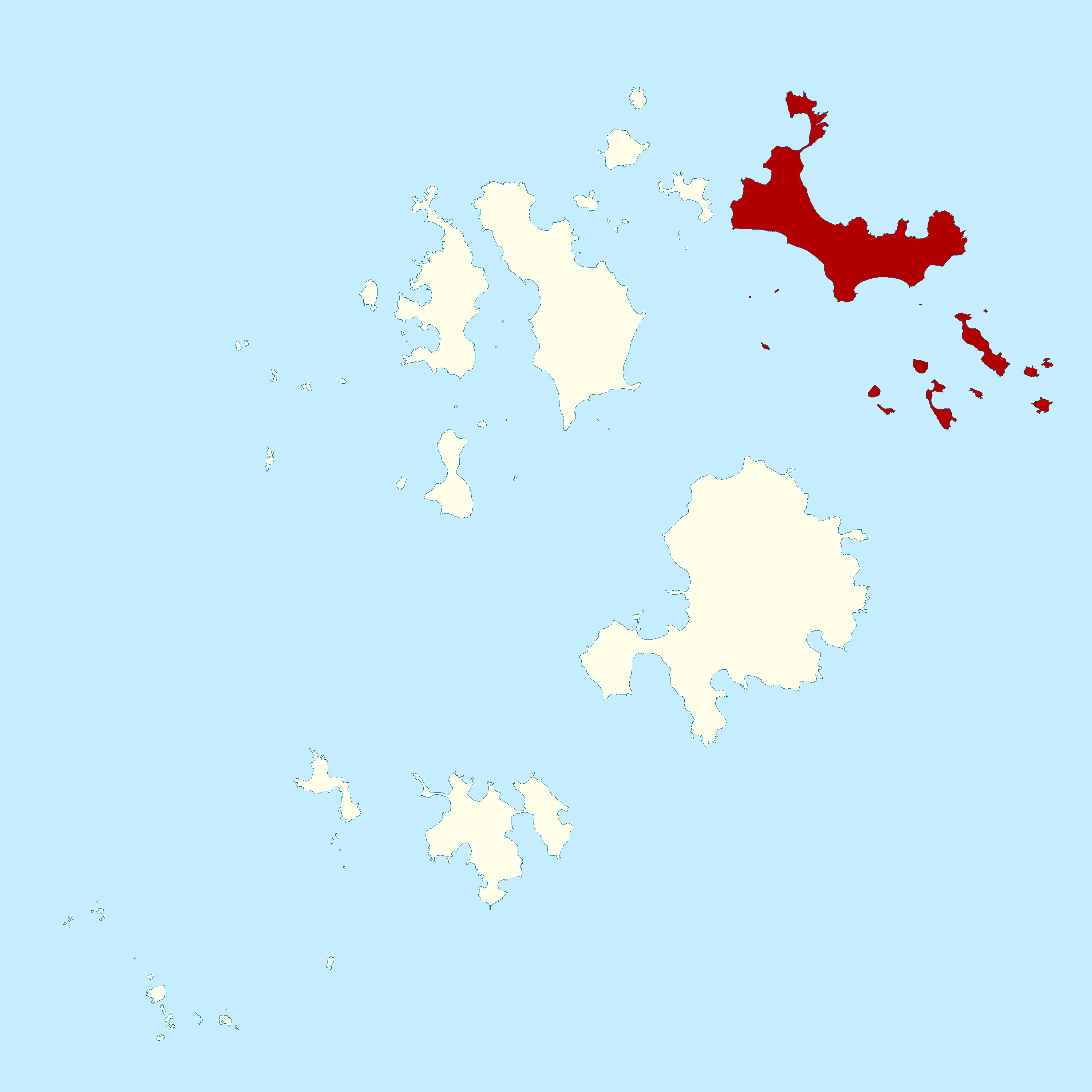
The isles of Scilly comprising the civil parish and ward of St Martin's shown in red

St Martin's is one of the five civil parishes of the Isles of Scilly, which are also wards. The civil parish and ward include several uninhabited islands and rocks, including the Eastern Isles, Great Ganilly, English Island and White Island. St Martin's returns one councillor to the Council of the Isles of Scilly, the same as the other "off-island" wards. The civil parish is not functional, however, and there is no council or meeting.

== Education ==
Five Islands Academy (previously Five Islands School) has its St Martin's Base, a primary campus. Secondary pupils board at the St Mary's main campus, staying there on weekdays and coming back and forth to their home islands on weekends.

Students at the sixth-form college level reside and board elsewhere, in mainland Great Britain. Previously the Learning and Skills Council paid for costs of accommodation for sixth-formers.

== Population ==
Population
City	Population
1841	214
1861	185
1871	158
1881	175
1891	174
1901	175
1911	191
1921	134
1931	134
1951	131
1961	118
1971	106
1981	118
1991	110
2001	142
2011	136
2021	135

== See also ==
- List of shipwrecks of the Isles of Scilly
