= Richsquare Friends Meetinghouse and Cemetery =

Historic site in Henry County, Indiana, US

- U.S. National Register of Historic Places
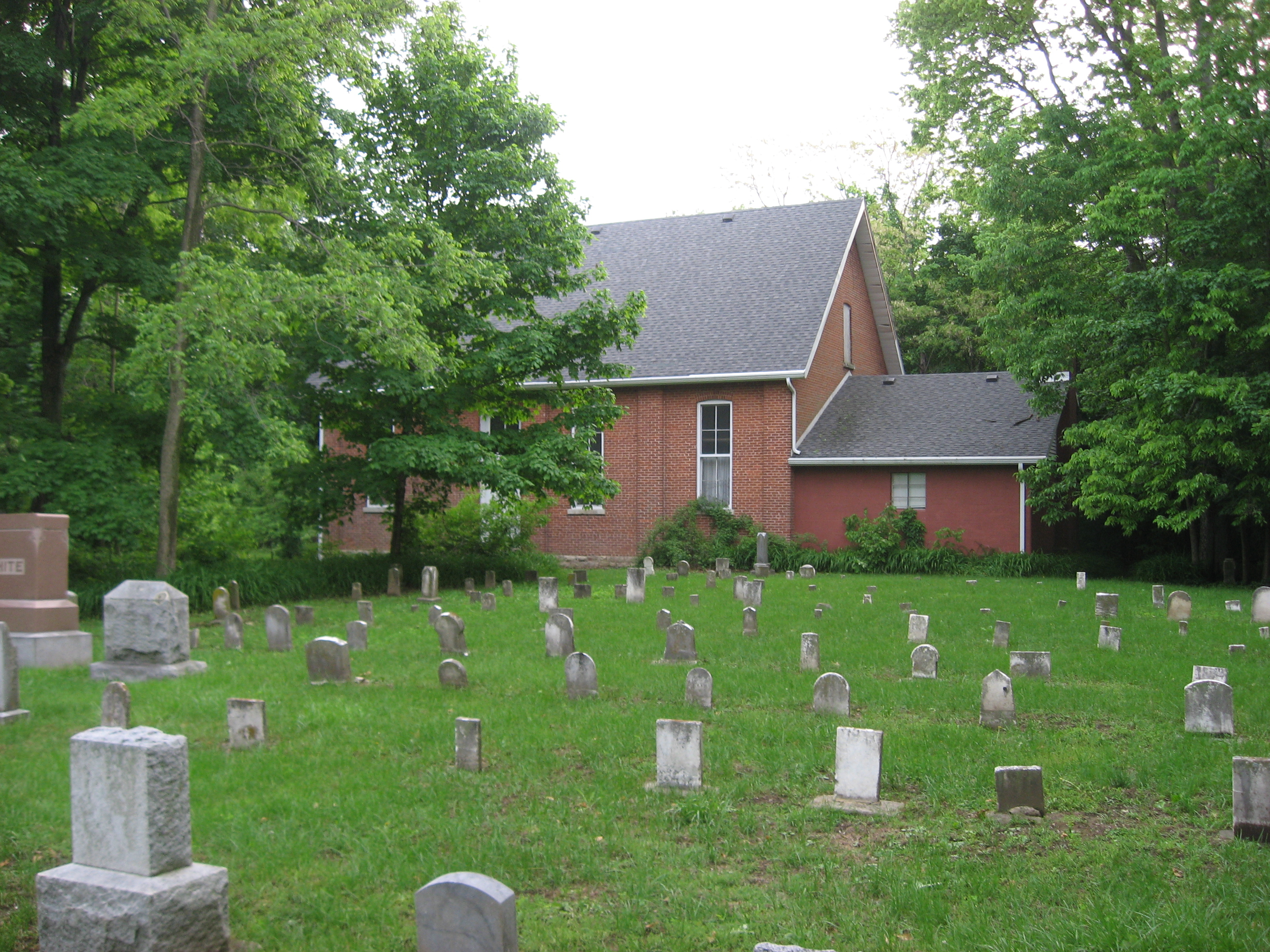
- Richsquare Friends Meetinghouse and Cemetery, May 2011

- Location within Indiana Location within the United States
- Location: 5685 S. 250E, north of Lewisville in Franklin Township, Henry County, Indiana
- Coordinates: 39°51′10″N 85°20′29″W
- Area: 1.1 acres (0.45 ha)
- Built: 1832, 1895
- Architectural style: Romanesque
- NRHP reference No.: 06000305
- Added to NRHP: April 19, 2006

Richsquare Friends Meetinghouse and Cemetery is an historic Quaker meeting house and cemetery located in Franklin Township, Henry County, Indiana. The meeting house was built in 1895, and is a one-story, brick building with a two-story Romanesque Revival style corner tower. A concrete block rear addition was built in 1955. It sits on a limestone foundation and has a steep gable roof. The adjacent cemetery was established in 1832 and remain an active burial ground with over 383 marked graves.

It was added to the National Register of Historic Places in 2006.
