= White Island, Isles of Scilly =

Island of Great Britain

White Island
Ar Nor
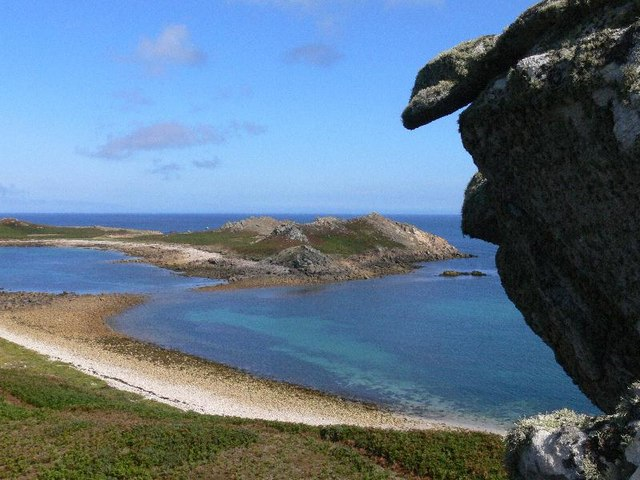
- White Island viewed from St Martin's

- Location within Isles of Scilly

Geography
- Coordinates: 49.979071°N 6.292114°W
- OS grid reference: SV924176
- Archipelago: Isles of Scilly
- Area: 0.059 sq mi (0.15 km^{2})

Administration
- United Kingdom
- Civil parish: St Martin's

Demographics
- Population: 0

White Island (Cornish: Ar Nor, "facing the mainland" or Enys Wynn "white island") is one of the larger unpopulated islands of the Isles of Scilly, part of the United Kingdom, and lies off the coast of the northernmost populated island of the group, St Martin's, to which it is joined by a tidal causeway, or isthmus. The island is designated as a Site of Special Scientific Interest (SSSI) and a Geological Conservation Review site and is managed by the Isles of Scilly Wildlife Trust on behalf of the Duchy of Cornwall.

Access to the island can be dangerous when the rocky causeway is covered by the sea, as there are strong currents across it.

This White Island should not be confused with a much smaller island of the same name, which lies off the coast of Samson.

== History ==
The uninhabited island lies off the north coast of St Martin's. It is about 15.25 hectares (37.7 acres) and until comparatively recently was part of St Martin’s. In 1814 the area of the island was estimated as fifty acres. At the north-east end of the island a fragment of altered killas, which at one time covered a much wider area, could be seen in 1911.

In common with the larger island, the place names are mostly English with the exception of Camper on the south-east coast (meaning tide race or roost in Cornish) and Porthmoren, a place on the west of the shingle and boulder bar that separates the two islands. In Cornish moren is a girl, or maiden, and porth is a landing place. The north-west of the island rises to a height of 21 metres (69 ft) and is topped by a ruined entrance grave. There are also other ancient monuments, including a chambered cairn and several other cairns, To the south, and sheltered by the hill, are six small mounds or cairns. Two walls indicating a bank and ditch field system are also present. An examination of one cairn in 1975 showed that it was about 3 metres (9.8 ft) across, possibly double walled on the north side and probably too small to be a hut circle. Only part of the island is scheduled as an Ancient Monument, but the county archaeological unit has recommended that the whole island should be scheduled.

== Natural history ==
White Island is designated as a SSSI because of the waved maritime heath, maritime grassland, breeding seabirds and for the sequence of Late Pleistocene deposits in the cleft of Chad Girt which almost cuts the island in two. The sequence of Quaternary deposits is as follows:

- A raised beach
- Granitic head known as Porthloo Breccia; named after the site on St Mary’s
- Gravel that underwent solifluction known as Hell Bay Gravel (Bryher) which consists of clasts and loess from glacial material in the Irish Sea
- Head with erratics named after the nearby site on St Martin’s (Bread and Cheese Breccia).

Because it lies on the northern edge of the archipelago, the island is particularly exposed to high winds and salt spray. Consequently, the thin skeletal soil is covered in wind-blown maritime heath made up principally of western gorse (Ulex gallii), bell heather (Erica cinerea) and heather (Calluna vulgaris). English stonecrop (Sedum anglicum), bird's-foot trefoil (Lotus corniculatus) and heath bedstraw (Galium saxatile) can be found growing among the heath and gorse. On the deeper soils, bracken (Pteridium aquilinum) dominates, with bramble (Rubus fruticosus) and honeysuckle (Lonicera periclymenum). Along the western coast of the island is a small area of maritime grassland with the usual Isles of Scilly species of red fescue (Festuca rubra), thrift (Armeria maritima), common scurvygrass (Cochlearia officinalis), buck’s-horn plantain (Plantago coronopus) and sea beet (Beta maritima). In April 2001 the first confirmed Scillonian record (since 1967) of the RDB gilt-edged lichen (Pseudocyphellaria aurata) was found on White Island. A widespread and frequent species in the tropics, often found in Macaronesia but rare on mainland Europe, this is a UK Biodiversity Action Plan Priority species and is protected under schedule 8 of the Wildlife and Countryside Act 1981.

=== Breeding birds ===
Four species of gull and one species of petrel breed on White Island. They are Great Black-backed Gull (Larus marinus), Lesser Black-backed Gull (L fuscus), Herring Gull (L argentatus), Kittiwake (Rissa tridactyla) and the Fulmar (Fulmarus glacialis).

== See also ==
- List of shipwrecks of the Isles of Scilly
