= Middletown Township =

Middletown Township is the name of several townships in the United States:

== Minnesota ==
- Middletown Township, Jackson County, Minnesota

== New Jersey ==
- Middletown Township, New Jersey

== Pennsylvania ==
- Middletown Township, Bucks County, Pennsylvania
- Middletown Township, Delaware County, Pennsylvania
- Middletown Township, Susquehanna County, Pennsylvania

== See also ==
- Middletown (disambiguation)
