= List of Indiana state historical markers in Henry County =

Location of Henry County in Indiana

This is a list of the Indiana state historical markers in Henry County.

This is intended to be a complete list of the official state historical markers placed in Henry County, Indiana, United States by the Indiana Historical Bureau. The locations of the historical markers and their latitude and longitude coordinates are included below when available, along with their names, years of placement, and topics as recorded by the Historical Bureau. There are 2 historical markers located in Henry County.

== Historical markers ==
Marker title	Image	Year placed	Location	Topics
Birthplace of Wilbur Wright		1966	1525 N. County Road 750E, 4 miles south of Mooreland and 3 miles north of Millville; 39°57′18″N 85°14′35″W	Science, Medicine, and Inventions, Transportation
Underground Station		1976	Southeastern corner of the junction of Main Street and Greensboro Pike in Greensboro; 39°52′38.8″N 85°27′52.4″W	Underground Railroad, African American

== See also ==
- List of Indiana state historical markers
- National Register of Historic Places listings in Henry County, Indiana
