= Henry F. Whitelock House and Farm =

Historic house in Indiana, United States

- U.S. National Register of Historic Places
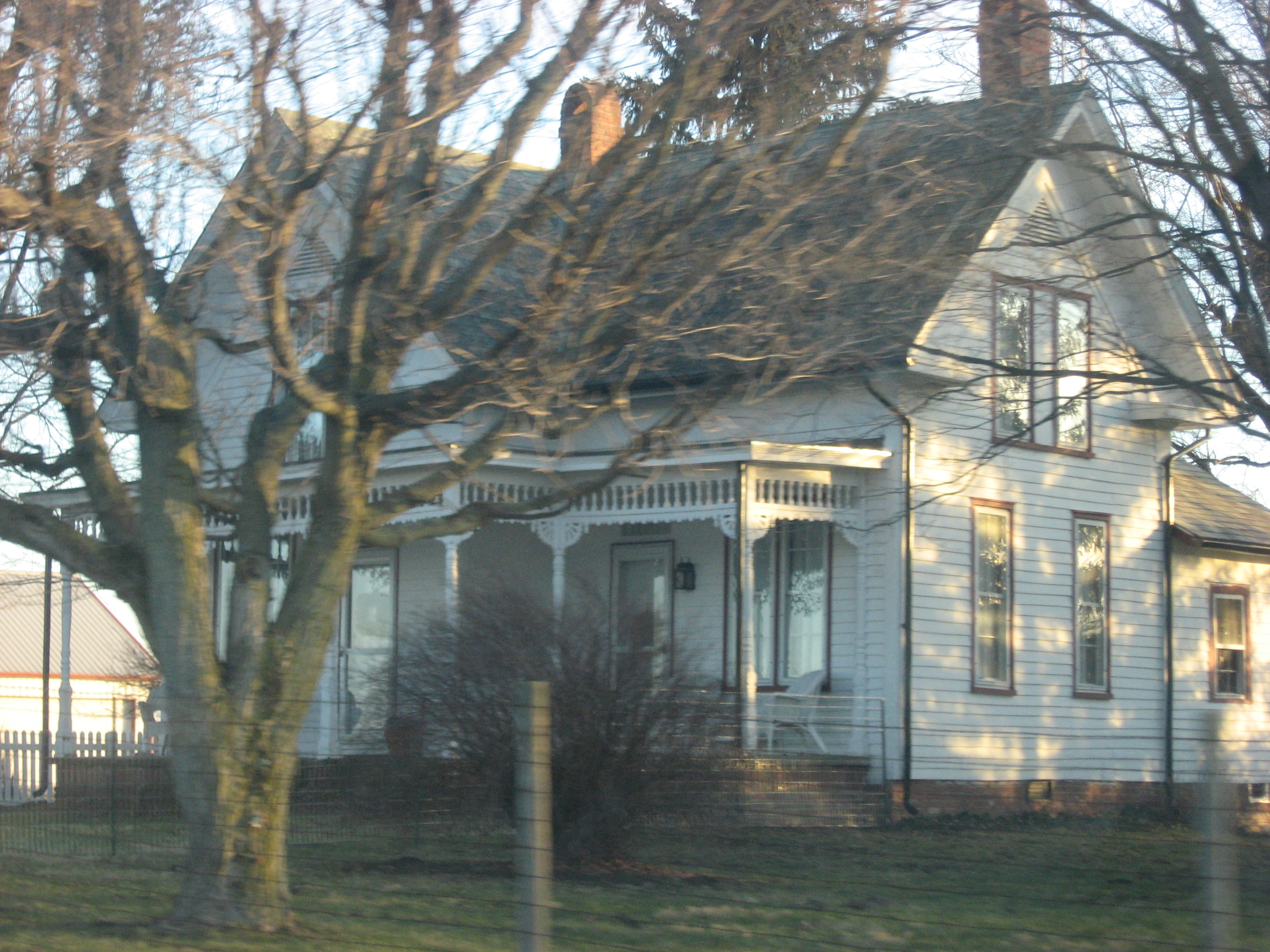
- Henry F. Whitelock House, January 2012

- Location within Indiana Location within the United States
- Location: State Road 38, north of Shirley in Harrison Township, Henry County, Indiana
- Coordinates: 39°57′46″N 85°32′37″W
- Area: 2.8 acres (1.1 ha)
- Built: 1836-1854
- Architectural style: Greek Revival
- NRHP reference No.: 83003565
- Added to NRHP: December 22, 1983

Henry F. Whitelock House and Farm is an historic home and farm located in Harrison Township, Henry County, Indiana. The house was built between 1836 and 1854, and is a 1 1/2-story, T-shaped vernacular Greek Revival style frame dwelling. It sits on a brick foundation and the original section is of hand-hewn post and beam construction. A front porch was added about 1890. Also located on the farm are a summer kitchen, smoke house, garage, two barns, and a chicken house.

It was added to the National Register of Historic Places in 1983.
