= Guyer Opera House =

- U.S. National Register of Historic Places
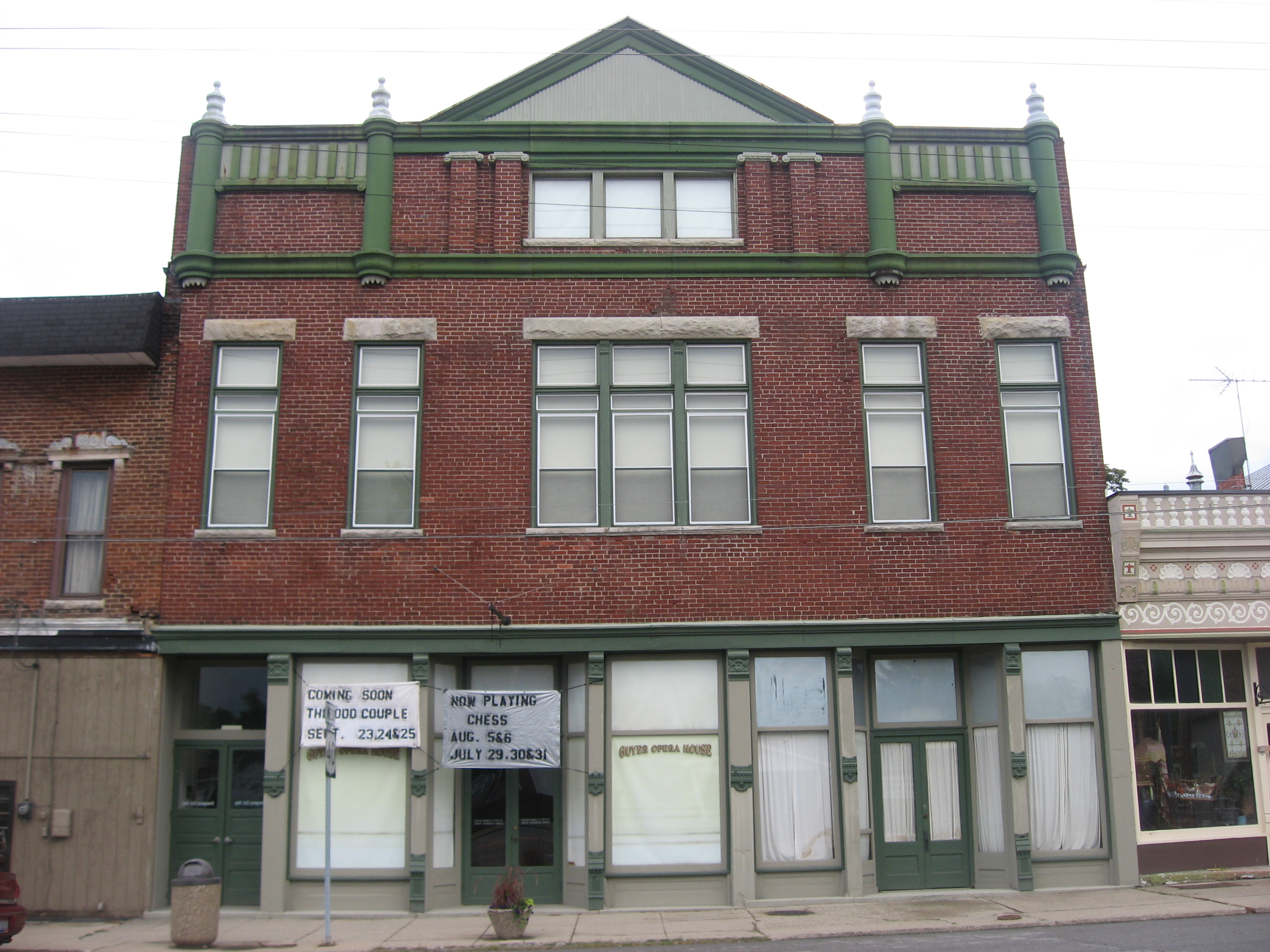
- Guyer Opera House, August 2011

- Location within Indiana Location within the United States
- Location: U.S. 40, Lewisville, Indiana
- Coordinates: 39°48′25″N 85°21′12″W
- Area: less than one acre
- Built: 1902
- NRHP reference No.: 79000018
- Added to NRHP: December 6, 1979

Guyer Opera House, also known as Lewisville Public Hall, is a historic theater and commercial building located at Lewisville, Indiana. It was built in 1901, and is a 2 1/2-story, brick building on a limestone foundation and a gable roof. The front facade features a large parapet and cast iron storefronts. The theater space is located on the second floor; it closed in 1942.

It was added to the National Register of Historic Places in 1979.

Built in 1901 and producing community theater in Henry County, Indiana since 1976, the Guyer Opera House is the only remaining gaslight-era theater and one of the most important historic buildings in Henry County.

It was discovered in 1969 after lying low for more than 20 years, and preservation efforts have continued ever since then. The Guyer operates as a non-profit community civic theater. All volunteers graciously donate their time and energy toward tasks like the upkeep of the building, production of shows in the upstairs auditorium and Aurora Studio Theatre downstairs.
