= Middletown Commercial Historic District =

Historic district in Indiana, United States

- U.S. National Register of Historic Places
- U.S. Historic district
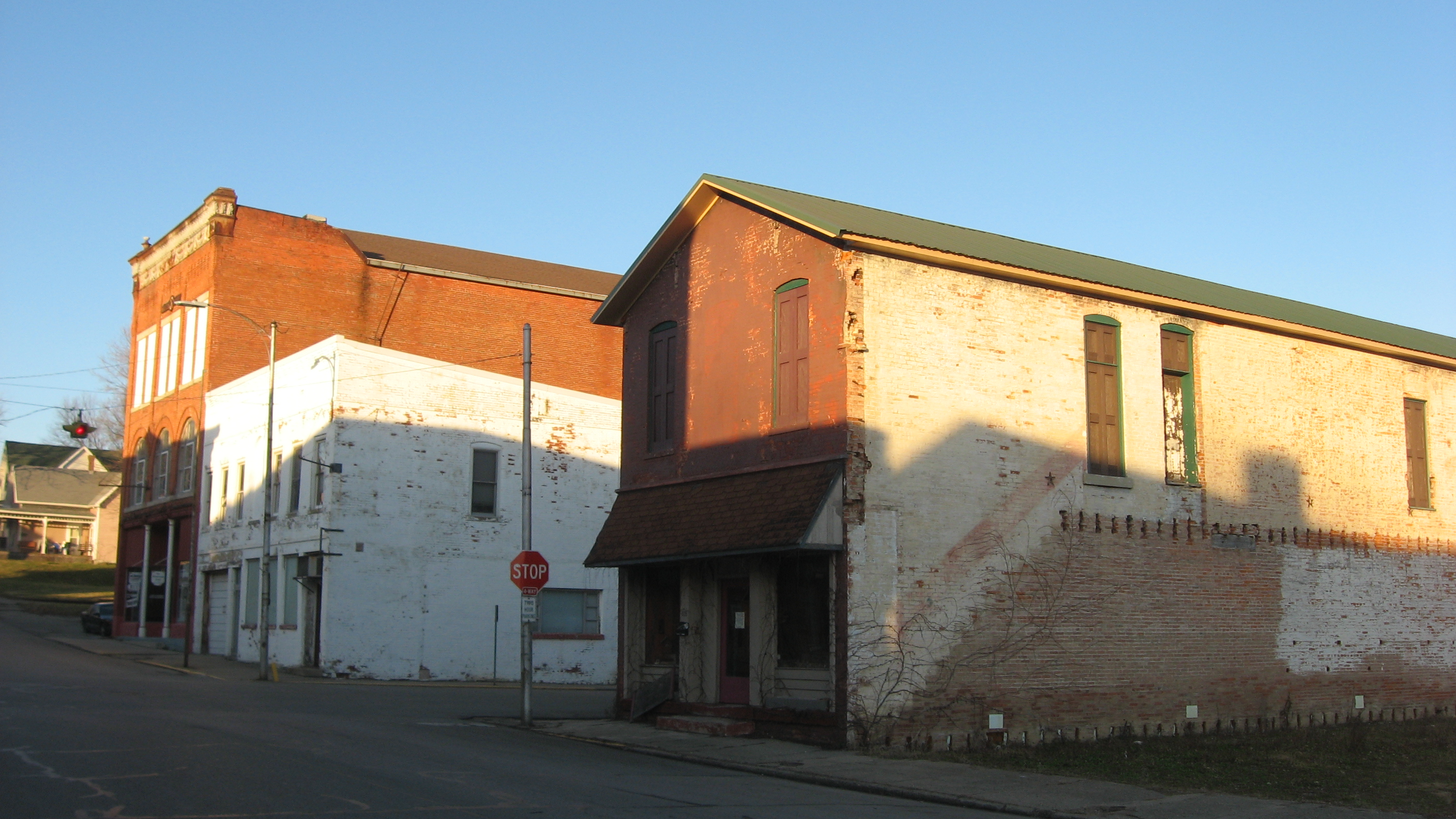
- Downtown Middletown, Indiana, January 2012

- Location within Indiana Location within the United States
- Location: The intersection of Fifth and Locust Sts. stretching approx. 125 ft. N. and 180 ft. S. of Locust and one block W., Middletown, Indiana
- Coordinates: 40°03′15″N 85°32′00″W
- Area: 3 acres (1.2 ha)
- Built: 1887
- Architect: Brown, Henry; Miller, O.L.
- Architectural style: Late Victorian, Classical Revival
- NRHP reference No.: 10000122
- Added to NRHP: March 31, 2010

The Middletown Commercial Historic District is national historic district located at Middletown, Indiana. It encompasses 17 contributing buildings in the central business district of Middletown. It developed between about the 1852 and 1916, and includes excellent examples of Italianate, Romanesque Revival, and Classical Revival styles of architecture. Notable buildings include the Hedrick Block (1891, 1995), Hedrick Block (1880), Tykle Building (1873), Druley Building (1899), Masonic Building (1899), Farmers State Bank (1914), Wisehart Building (1916), and Summers Building (1868).

It was added to the National Register of Historic Places in 2010.
