= Boulder wall =

Wall of flints and pebbles

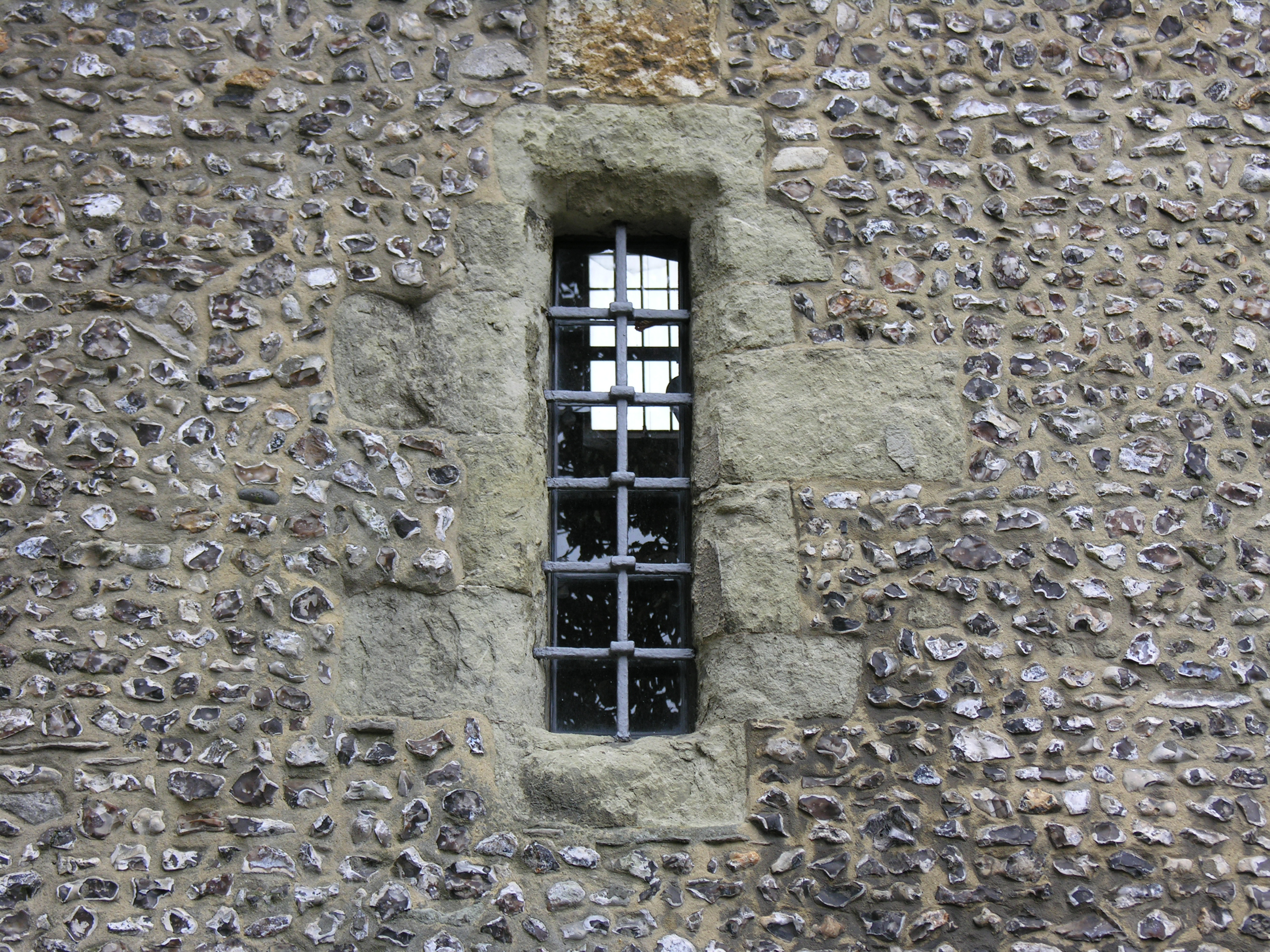

A boulder wall, also spelled boulder-walls or bowlder-wall, is a kind of wall built of round flints and pebbles, laid in a strong mortar. It is used where the sea has a beach cast up, or where there are plenty of flints.

== See also ==
- Dry stone
