= Middle Town, St Agnes =

Coordinates: 49.893472°N 6.344287°W

Middle Town: Cornish: Tregres
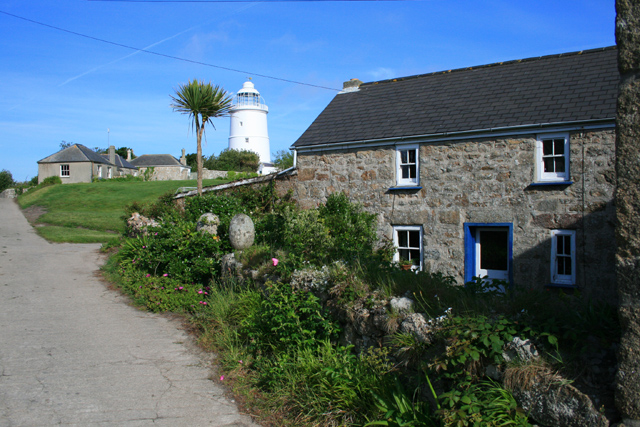
- The last Cottage in Middle Town

- Location within Isles of Scilly
- Unitary authority: Isles of Scilly
- Ceremonial county: Cornwall
- Region: South West
- Country: England
- Sovereign state: United Kingdom
- Post town: ISLES OF SCILLY
- Postcode district: TR22
- Dialling code: 01720
- Police: Devon and Cornwall
- Fire: Isles of Scilly
- Ambulance: South Western
- UK Parliament: St Ives

Middle Town (Cornish: Tregres) is a small settlement on the island of St Agnes. It includes the island's primary school, post office and general store, and the old lighthouse (built 1680).
