= Franklin Township, Henry County, Indiana =

Franklin Township
- Township
- Location in Henry County
- Coordinates: 39°50′18″N 85°21′54″W
- Country: United States
- State: Indiana
- County: Henry

Government
  - Type: Indiana township

Area
  - Total: 28.61 sq mi (74.1 km^{2})
  - Land: 28.48 sq mi (73.8 km^{2})
  - Water: 0.13 sq mi (0.34 km^{2}) 0.45%
- Elevation: 1,060 ft (323 m)

Population (2020)
  - Total: 1,073
  - Density: 40.6/sq mi (15.7/km^{2})
- GNIS feature ID: 0453305

Franklin Township is one of thirteen townships in Henry County, Indiana, United States. As of the 2010 census, its population was 1,157 and it contained 486 housing units.

Franklin Township was organized in 1830.

== History ==
Richsquare Friends Meetinghouse and Cemetery was added to the National Register of Historic Places in 2006.

== Geography ==
According to the 2010 census, the township has a total area of 28.61 square miles (74.1 km^{2}), of which 28.48 square miles (73.8 km^{2}) (or 99.55%) is land and 0.13 square miles (0.34 km^{2}) (or 0.45%) is water. The stream of Applebutter Creek runs through this township.

=== Cities and towns ===
- Lewisville

=== Adjacent townships ===
- Henry Township (north)
- Liberty Township (northeast)
- Dudley Township (east)
- Washington Township, Rush County (south)
- Center Township, Rush County (southwest)
- Spiceland Township (west)

=== Cemeteries ===
The township contains one cemetery, Ebenezer.

=== Major highways ===
- Interstate 70
- U.S. Route 40
- State Road 3
- State Road 103
