= Harrison Township, Henry County, Indiana =

Harrison Township
- Township
- Location in Henry County
- Coordinates: 39°57′07″N 85°30′18″W
- Country: United States
- State: Indiana
- County: Henry

Government
  - Type: Indiana township

Area
  - Total: 35.68 sq mi (92.4 km^{2})
  - Land: 35.6 sq mi (92 km^{2})
  - Water: 0.08 sq mi (0.21 km^{2}) 0.22%
- Elevation: 1,060 ft (323 m)

Population (2020)
  - Total: 1,427
  - Density: 38/sq mi (15/km^{2})
- GNIS feature ID: 0453388

Harrison Township is one of thirteen townships in Henry County, Indiana, United States. As of the 2010 census, its population was 1,352 and it contained 587 housing units.

Harrison Township was organized in 1838.

== History ==
Henry F. Whitelock House and Farm was added to the National Register of Historic Places in 1983.

== Geography ==
According to the 2010 census, the township has a total area of 35.68 square miles (92.4 km^{2}), of which 35.6 square miles (92 km^{2}) (or 99.78%) is land and 0.08 square miles (0.21 km^{2}) (or 0.22%) is water. The streams of Bone Run, Cadiz Run, Clear Spring, Down Run, Hendricks Brook, Jakes Branch, Owner Run and Quaker Run run through this township.

=== Cities and towns ===
- Cadiz

=== Adjacent townships ===
- Fall Creek Township (north)
- Jefferson Township (northeast)
- Henry Township (east)
- Greensboro Township (south)
- Adams Township, Madison County (west)
- Brown Township, Hancock County (west)

=== Cemeteries ===
The township contains two cemeteries: Hess, Cadiz Friends, Clear Springs, & Quaker. Also, there is the Hedrick cemetery located on the Grant City Rd. 1/4 mile south of the CENTRAL AVENUE rd.

=== Major highways ===
- Indiana State Road 38
- Indiana State Road 234
