= Higher Town, Isles of Scilly =

Coordinates: 49.960°N 6.283°W

Higher Town: Cornish: Trewartha
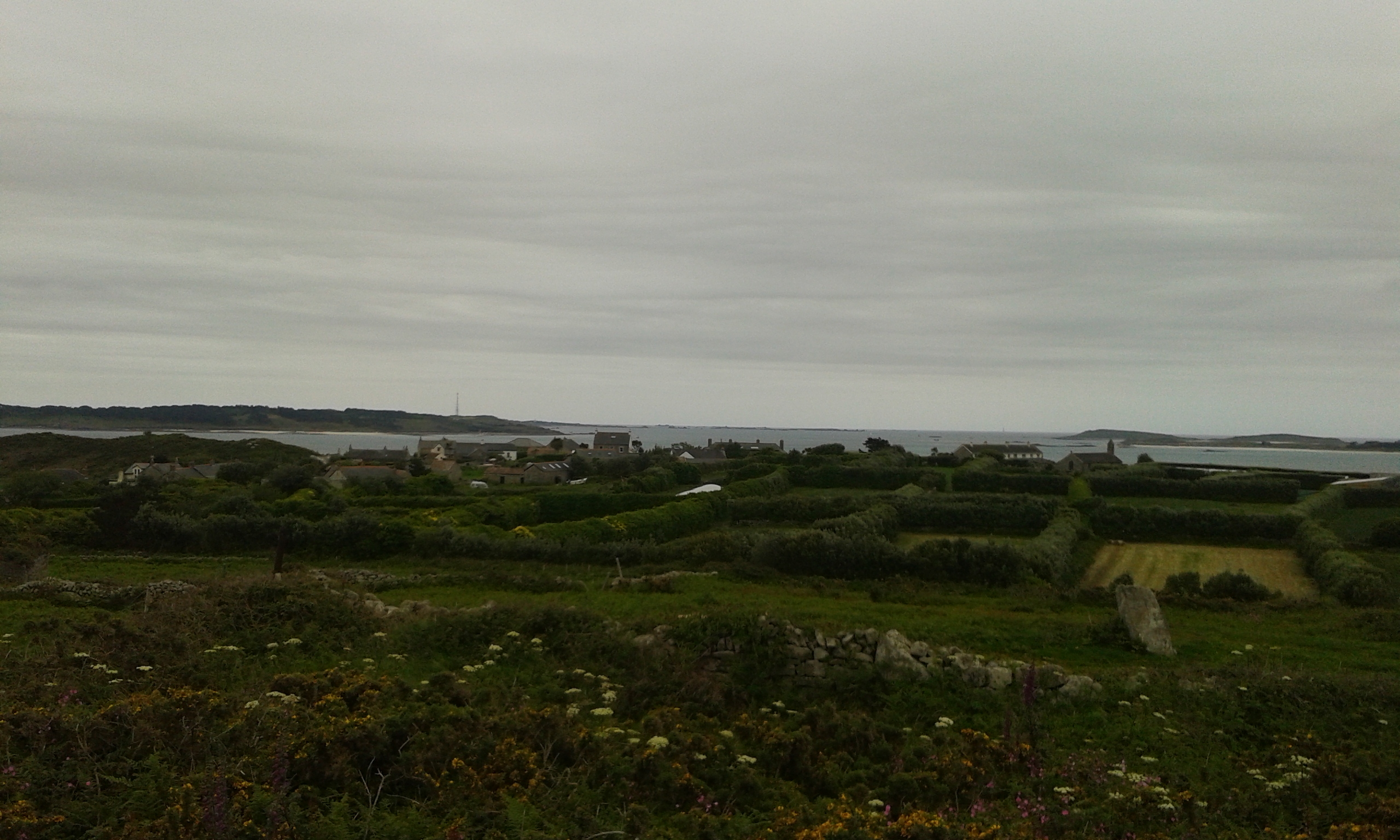
- View from the north (inland) with the parish church to the right

- Location within Isles of Scilly
- OS grid reference: SV929155
- Unitary authority: Isles of Scilly
- Ceremonial county: Cornwall
- Region: South West
- Country: England
- Sovereign state: United Kingdom
- Post town: ISLES OF SCILLY
- Postcode district: TR25
- Dialling code: 01720
- Police: Devon and Cornwall
- Fire: Isles of Scilly
- Ambulance: South Western
- UK Parliament: St Ives

Higher Town (Cornish: Trewartha) is the easternmost and largest settlement on the island of St Martin's in the Isles of Scilly, England. It is situated just inland, though the more modern of the island's two quays is just south of the settlement and is named Higher Town Quay.

The town has a bakery, St Martin's Bakery, and the island's main shop and only post office.

Both of the island's churches are in Higher Town: the Church of England parish church of St Martin, and a Methodist chapel (one of two in the Isles of Scilly) which dates from about 1845. The island's fire and coastguard station is next to the parish church.

The highest elevation of the town (though not the island as a whole) is near the post office, at 32 metres (105 ft) above sea level.

== St Agnes ==
There is also a small settlement called Higher Town on the island of St Agnes. The island's pub (the Turk's Head) is between Higher Town and the island's quay at Porth Conger.
