= John W. Hedrick House =

Historic house in Indiana, United States

- U.S. National Register of Historic Places
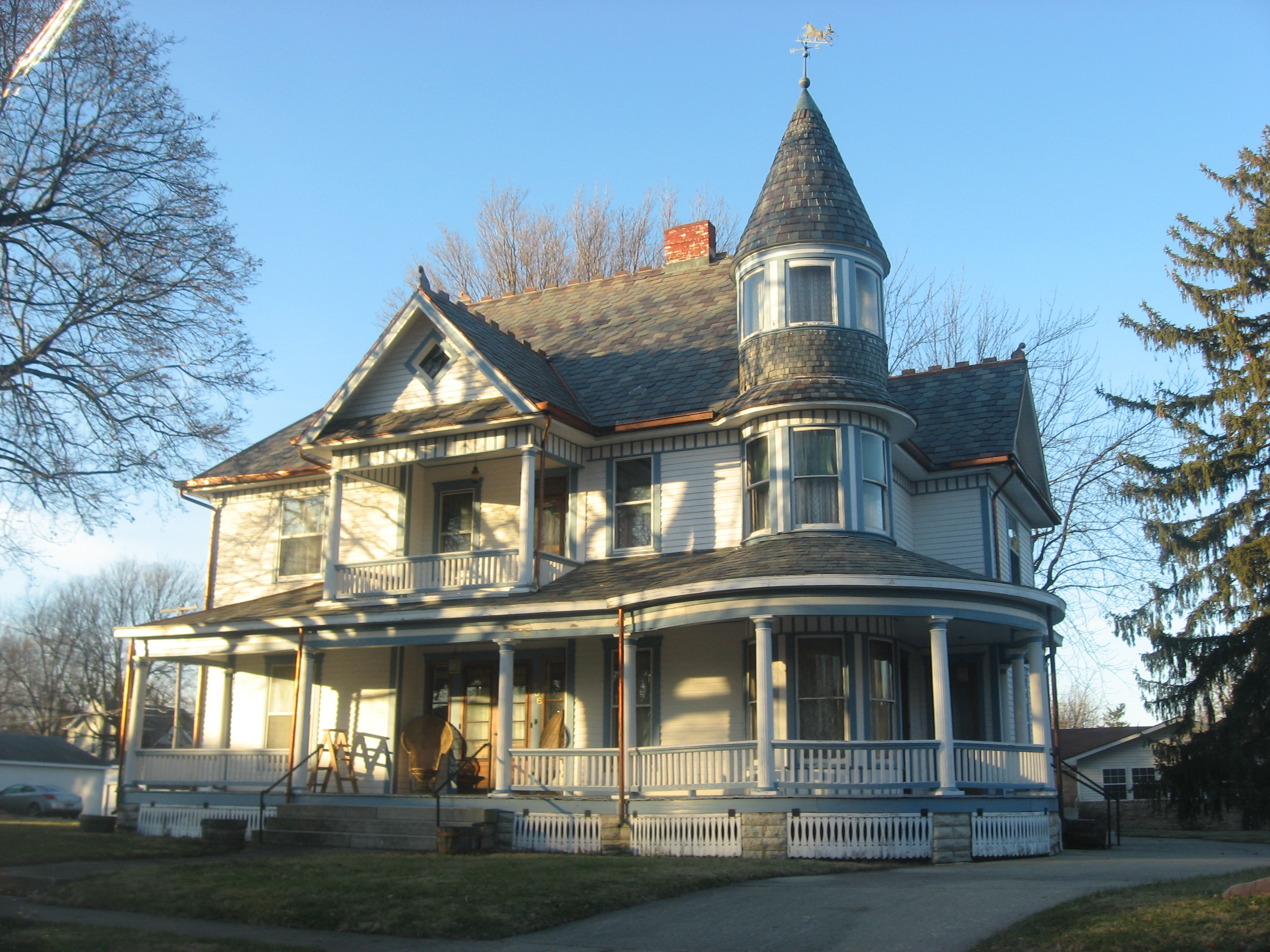
- John W. Hedrick House, January 2012

- Location within Indiana Location within the United States
- Location: 506 High St., Middletown, Indiana
- Coordinates: 40°3′22″N 85°32′1″W
- Area: less than one acre
- Built: 1899
- Built by: Miller, L. O.
- Architectural style: Queen Anne
- NRHP reference No.: 84000491
- Added to NRHP: December 27, 1984

John W. Hedrick House is historic home located at Middletown, Indiana, United States. It was built in 1899, and is a 2 1/2-story, Queen Anne style frame dwelling. It sits on a stone foundation and has a multi-gable / hipped roof. It features a three-story, round corner tower with a conical roof and wraparound porch with Doric order columns.

It was added to the National Register of Historic Places in 1984.
