= Lewisville, Indiana =

- Town
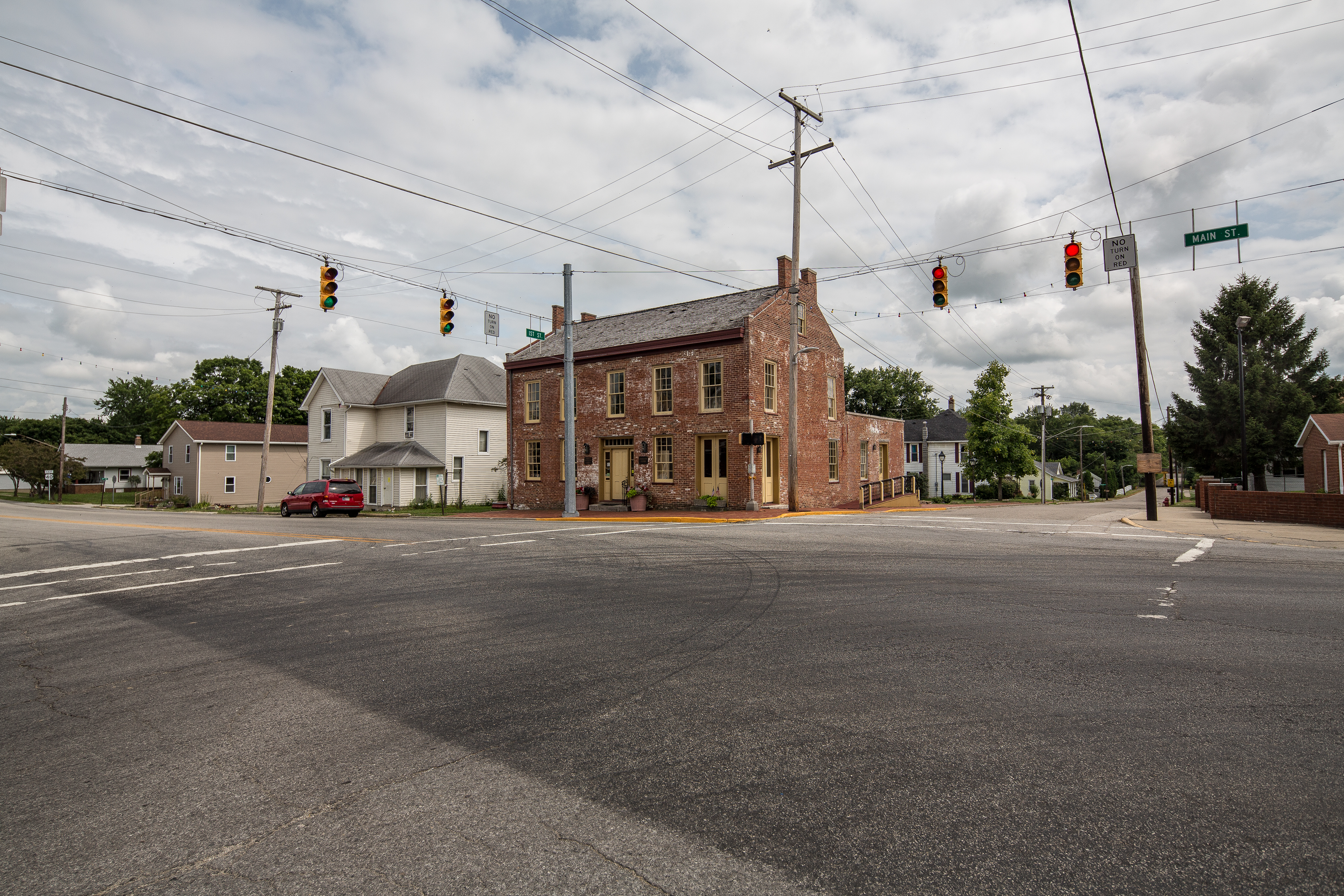

- Logo

- Location of Lewisville in Henry County, Indiana.
- Coordinates: 39°48′24″N 85°21′10″W
- Country: United States
- State: Indiana
- County: Henry
- Township: Franklin

Area
  - Total: 0.26 sq mi (0.67 km^{2})
  - Land: 0.26 sq mi (0.67 km^{2})
  - Water: 0 sq mi (0.00 km^{2})
- Elevation: 1,053 ft (321 m)

Population (2020)
  - Total: 337
  - Estimate (2025): 342 ▲
  - Density: 1,311.4/sq mi (506.32/km^{2})
- Time zone: UTC-5 (Eastern (EST))
  - Summer (DST): UTC-4 (EDT)
- ZIP code: 47352
- Area code: 765
- FIPS code: 18-43074
- GNIS feature ID: 2396716
- Website: lewisvillein.net

Lewisville is a town in Franklin Township, Henry County, Indiana, United States. The population was 337 at the 2020 census.

== History ==
Lewisville was platted in 1829, and named for Lewis C. Freeman one of its founders and afterward first postmaster. A post office has been in operation in Lewisville since 1831. In 1833 (when there was considerable inconsistency in the spelling of Indiana place names), it was described as follows: 'Louisville, a village in Henry county, on the National Road [U.S. 40], on the east bank of Flatrock, about ten miles south of Newcastle. It contains a small population, and one store; but has a prospect of rapid increase.' By 1909, it had a population of 503, more than 2 dozen businesses, two doctors, a newspaper, and a railway station.

Guyer Opera House was added to the National Register of Historic Places in 1979.

== Geography ==
Lewisville is located along the Flatrock River.

According to the 2010 census, Lewisville has a total area of 0.25 square miles (0.65 km^{2}), all land.

== Demographics ==
Historical population
Census	Pop.	Note	%±
1850	193		—
1870	416		—
1880	446		7.2%
1890	420		−5.8%
1900	404		−3.8%
1910	446		10.4%
1920	460		3.1%
1930	442		−3.9%
1940	531		20.1%
1950	591		11.3%
1960	592		0.2%
1970	530		−10.5%
1980	577		8.9%
1990	437		−24.3%
2000	395		−9.6%
2010	366		−7.3%
2020	337		−7.9%
2025 (est.)	342		1.5%
U.S. Decennial Census

=== 2010 census ===
As of the census of 2010, there were 366 people, 145 households, and 104 families living in the town. The population density was 1,464.0 inhabitants per square mile (565.3/km^{2}). There were 164 housing units at an average density of 656.0 per square mile (253.3/km^{2}). The racial makeup of the town was 99.5% White and 0.5% from two or more races. Hispanic or Latino of any race were 1.4% of the population.

There were 145 households, of which 29.0% had children under the age of 18 living with them, 56.6% were married couples living together, 11.7% had a female householder with no husband present, 3.4% had a male householder with no wife present, and 28.3% were non-families. 25.5% of all households were made up of individuals, and 13.8% had someone living alone who was 65 years of age or older. The average household size was 2.52 and the average family size was 2.95.

The median age in the town was 42.4 years. 20.5% of residents were under the age of 18; 9.5% were between the ages of 18 and 24; 24.3% were from 25 to 44; 27.8% were from 45 to 64; and 17.8% were 65 years of age or older. The gender makeup of the town was 46.7% male and 53.3% female.

=== 2000 census ===
As of the census of 2000, there were 395 people, 151 households, and 117 families living in the town. The population density was 1,206.4 inhabitants per square mile (465.8/km^{2}). There were 157 housing units at an average density of 479.5 per square mile (185.1/km^{2}). The racial makeup of the town was 99.24% White, and 0.76% from two or more races.

There were 151 households, out of which 33.1% had children under the age of 18 living with them, 66.9% were married couples living together, 7.3% had a female householder with no husband present, and 21.9% were non-families. 19.2% of all households were made up of individuals, and 11.9% had someone living alone who was 65 years of age or older. The average household size was 2.62 and the average family size was 2.97.

In the town, the population was spread out, with 23.8% under the age of 18, 10.4% from 18 to 24, 25.8% from 25 to 44, 21.5% from 45 to 64, and 18.5% who were 65 years of age or older. The median age was 39 years. For every 100 females, there were 94.6 males. For every 100 females age 18 and over, there were 90.5 males.

The median household income of the town was $37,841, and the median family income was $43,750. Males had a median income of $34,750, versus $23,864 for females. The per capita income for the town was $15,476. About 4.5% of families and 8.3% of the population were below the poverty line, including 12.1% of those under age 18 and none of those age 65 or over.
