= Middletown, Indiana =

Middletown
- Town
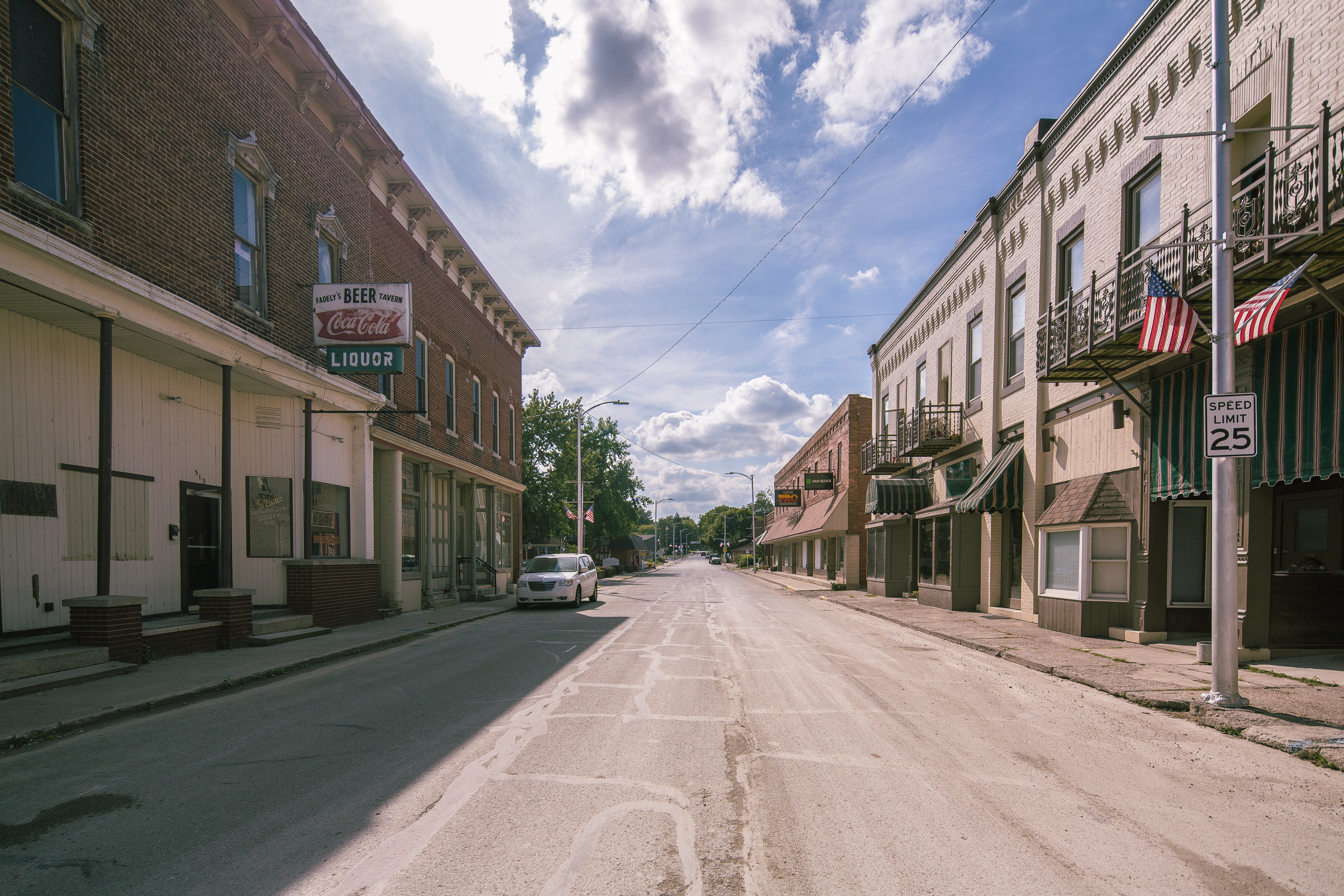

- Location of Middletown in Henry County, Indiana.
- Coordinates: 40°3′26″N 85°32′28″W
- Country: United States
- State: Indiana
- County: Henry
- Township: Fall Creek
- Platted: 1829

Area
  - Total: 1.16 sq mi (3.01 km^{2})
  - Land: 1.16 sq mi (3.00 km^{2})
  - Water: 0.0039 sq mi (0.01 km^{2})
- Elevation: 978 ft (298 m)

Population (2020)
  - Total: 2,253
  - Estimate (2025): 2,282 ▲
  - Density: 1,944.7/sq mi (750.86/km^{2})
- Time zone: UTC-5 (Eastern)
  - Summer (DST): UTC-4 (EDT)
- ZIP code: 47356
- Area code: 765
- FIPS code: 18-49014
- GNIS feature ID: 2396759
- Website: www.middletownin.com

Middletown is a town in northwest Henry County, Indiana, United States. The population was 2,255 at the 2020 census.

== History ==
Middletown was platted in 1829. The town's name is locational, for it lies halfway between New Castle and Anderson. A post office was established at Middletown in 1830. Middletown was incorporated as a town in 1840.

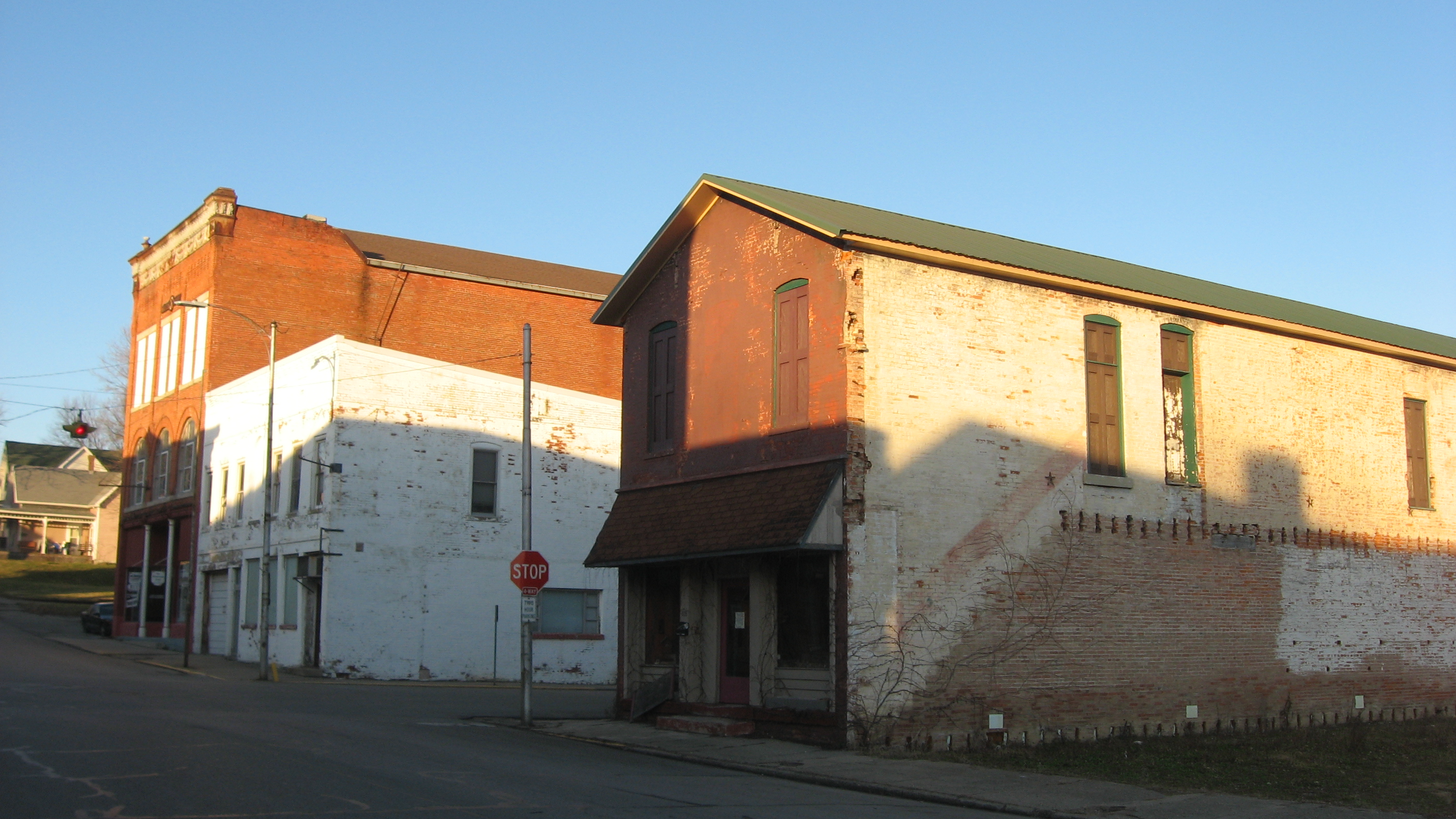
Buildings in downtown Middletown

The John W. Hedrick House and Middletown Commercial Historic District are listed on the National Register of Historic Places.

== Geography ==
According to the 2010 census, Middletown has a total area of 1.16 square miles (3.00 km^{2}), all land.

== Demographics ==
Historical population
Census	Pop.	Note	%±
1850	188		—
1860	368		95.7%
1870	711		93.2%
1880	606		−14.8%
1890	851		40.4%
1900	1,801		111.6%
1910	1,174		−34.8%
1920	1,273		8.4%
1930	1,348		5.9%
1940	1,520		12.8%
1950	1,731		13.9%
1960	2,033		17.4%
1970	2,046		0.6%
1980	2,978		45.6%
1990	2,333		−21.7%
2000	2,488		6.6%
2010	2,322		−6.7%
2020	2,253		−3.0%
2025 (est.)	2,282	▲	1.3%
US Decennial Census

=== 2020 census ===
As of the 2020 census, Middletown had a population of 2,253. The median age was 36.6 years. 25.0% of residents were under the age of 18 and 16.2% of residents were 65 years of age or older. For every 100 females there were 90.3 males, and for every 100 females age 18 and over there were 84.0 males age 18 and over.

0.0% of residents lived in urban areas, while 100.0% lived in rural areas.

There were 923 households in Middletown, of which 34.2% had children under the age of 18 living in them. Of all households, 36.6% were married-couple households, 18.7% were households with a male householder and no spouse or partner present, and 33.7% were households with a female householder and no spouse or partner present. About 30.4% of all households were made up of individuals and 12.6% had someone living alone who was 65 years of age or older.

There were 1,022 housing units, of which 9.7% were vacant. The homeowner vacancy rate was 2.1% and the rental vacancy rate was 10.8%.

Racial composition as of the 2020 census
Race	Number	Percent
White	2,097	93.1%
Black or African American	18	0.8%
American Indian and Alaska Native	11	0.5%
Asian	10	0.4%
Native Hawaiian and Other Pacific Islander	1	0.0%
Some other race	16	0.7%
Two or more races	100	4.4%
Hispanic or Latino (of any race)	46	2.0%

=== 2010 census ===
As of the 2010 United States census, there were 2,322 people, 894 households, and 594 families in the town. The population density was 2,001.7 inhabitants per square mile (772.9/km^{2}). There were 998 housing units at an average density of 860.3 per square mile (332.2/km^{2}). The racial makeup of the town was 97.6% White, 0.3% African American, 0.1% Native American, 0.5% Asian, 0.2% from other races, and 1.3% from two or more races. Hispanic or Latino of any race were 0.8% of the population.

There were 894 households, of which 37.5% had children under the age of 18 living with them, 42.8% were married couples living together, 17.7% had a female householder with no husband present, 5.9% had a male householder with no wife present, and 33.6% were non-families. 27.7% of all households were made up of individuals, and 10.6% had someone living alone who was 65 years of age or older. The average household size was 2.51 and the average family size was 3.02.

The median age in the town was 36.6 years. 27.8% of residents were under the age of 18; 9% were between the ages of 18 and 24; 24.9% were from 25 to 44; 22.6% were from 45 to 64; and 15.6% were 65 years of age or older. The gender makeup of the town was 46.8% male and 53.2% female.

=== 2000 census ===
As of the 2000 United States census, there were 2,488 people, 984 households, and 651 families in the town. The population density was 2,260.4 inhabitants per square mile (872.7/km^{2}). There were 1,051 housing units at an average density of 954.9 per square mile (368.7/km^{2}). The racial makeup of the town was 98.31% White, 0.48% African American, 0.28% Native American, 0.28% Asian, 0.04% from other races, and 0.60% from two or more races. Hispanic or Latino of any race were 0.28% of the population.

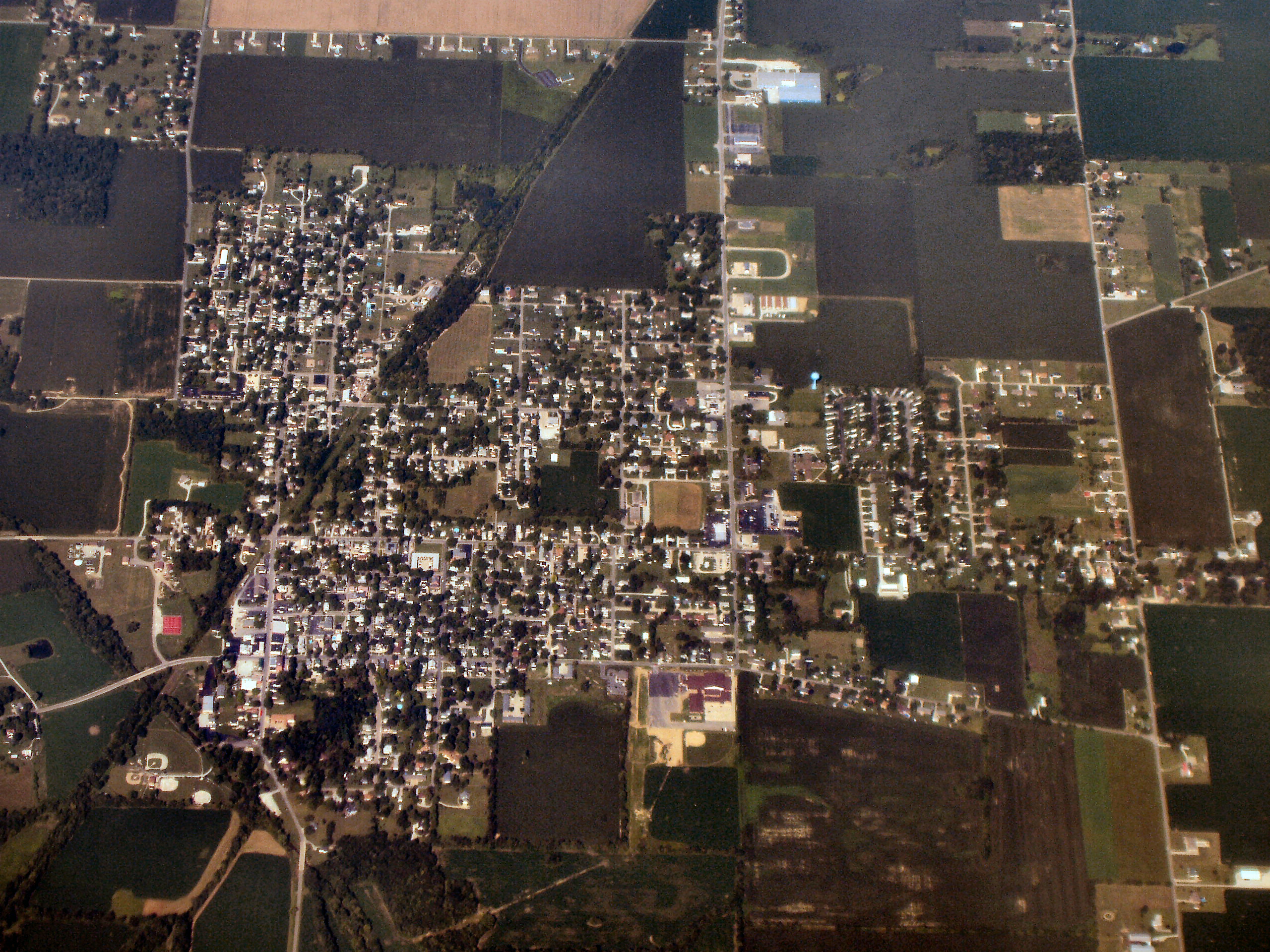
Middletown from the air, looking west.

There were 984 households, out of which 36.3% had children under the age of 18 living with them, 48.0% were married couples living together, 14.2% had a female householder with no husband present, and 33.8% were non-families. 29.0% of all households were made up of individuals, and 13.2% had someone living alone who was 65 years of age or older. The average household size was 2.43 and the average family size was 2.99.

The town population contained 28.3% under the age of 18, 8.2% from 18 to 24, 29.5% from 25 to 44, 19.8% from 45 to 64, and 14.3% who were 65 years of age or older. The median age was 34 years. For every 100 females, there were 86.5 males. For every 100 females age 18 and over, there were 80.9 males.

The median income for a household in the town was $32,591, and the median income for a family was $39,922. Males had a median income of $33,152 versus $20,188 for females. The per capita income for the town was $16,017. About 7.4% of families and 8.2% of the population were below the poverty line, including 9.8% of those under age 18 and 3.3% of those age 65 or over.

== Education ==
The Shenandoah School Corporation provides education at Shenandoah High School, Shenandoah Middle School and Shenandoah Elementary School in Middletown.

The town has a lending library, the Middletown Fall Creek Township Public Library.

== Notable people ==
- John Hazelton Cotteral (1864−1933) − United States district and appellate judge.
- Mikel Harry (1951−2017) − father of Six Sigma.
- Beth Solomon (b. 1952) − professional golfer.
- Silas Allred (b. 2002) − collegiate wrestler.
- Caleb Moistner & Hunter Michael (b. 2010 & 2011) - Co-founders of the locally founded, The Hidden Gem Project
