= Isles of Scilly Fire and Rescue Service =

Fire and rescue service in the UK Isles of Scilly

Operational area
- Country: England
- Sui generis unitary authority: Isles of Scilly

Agency overview
- Employees: 42 (2025)

Facilities and equipment
- Stations: 5

Website
- www.scilly.gov.uk/community-safety/fire-rescue

The Isles of Scilly Fire and Rescue Service is the statutory local authority fire and rescue service covering the Isles of Scilly off the coast of the South West of England. It is the smallest fire and rescue service in the United Kingdom and the only one to be staffed entirely by retained firefighters.

The service shares management, and cooperates closely with the airport rescue and fire fighting service (St Mary's Airport RFFS) on St Mary's, which is the only other fire service on the Isles of Scilly.

== Fire stations and appliances ==
=== Isles of Scilly Fire and Rescue Service ===
| Station Name | Duty System | Appliances |
|---|---|---|
| St. Mary's | Retained | 2008 MAN; 2010 4x4 Toyota Hilux [with Foam/Water Carrier Trailer] |
| St Agnes | Retained | 1986 Tractor & water bowser trailer |
| Bryher | Retained | 1986 Tractor & water bowser trailer |
| Tresco | Retained | 2016 Mercedes Sprinter 6x6 |
| St Martin's | Retained | 1986 Tractor & water bowser trailer |

=== St Mary's Airport Rescue and Fire Fighting Service ===
| Station Name | Duty System | Appliances |
|---|---|---|
| St Mary's Airport | Day manned | Carmichael Mercedes 1124 foam tender Angloco MAN foam tender |

== Personnel ==
The fire service has 43 employees, which includes 39 on-call firefighters, a uniformed chief fire officer responsible to the chief executive of the Council of the Isles of Scilly, and a non-operational member of support staff. The council is the Fire and Rescue Authority.

== Inspections ==
The fire service has a responsibility for domestic and commercial inspections of premises for fire safety. It carries out these inspections on the smaller islands, but contracts them on the main island (St Mary's), where domestic inspections are carried out by the full-time firefighters of the airport fire service, and commercial premises inspections are carried out by Cornwall Fire and Rescue Service.

== Performance ==
Every fire and rescue service in England and Wales is periodically subjected to a statutory inspection by His Majesty's Inspectorate of Constabulary and Fire & Rescue Services (HMICFRS). The inspections investigate how well the service performs in each of three areas. On a scale of outstanding, good, requires improvement and inadequate, Isles of Scilly Fire and Rescue Service was rated as follows:

HMICFRS Inspection Isles of Scilly
| Area | Rating 2018/19 | Rating 2021/22 | Description |
|---|---|---|---|
| Effectiveness | Good | Good | How effective is the fire and rescue service at keeping people safe and secure from fire and other risks? |
| Efficiency | Good | Requires improvement | How efficient is the fire and rescue service at keeping people safe and secure from fire and other risks? |
| People | Requires improvement | Good | How well does the fire and rescue service look after its people? |

== See also ==
- List of British firefighters killed in the line of duty
