= Luray =

Luray may refer to:

- Luray, Eure-et-Loir, a commune in the Eure-et-Loir département, France
- Luray, Indiana
- Luray, Kansas
- Luray, Missouri
- Luray, Ohio
- Luray, South Carolina
- Luray, Tennessee
- Luray, Virginia
  - Luray Caverns, Virginia
