= Springport =

Springport may refer to:

== Places ==
In the United States:

- Springport, Indiana
- Springport, Michigan, village in Jackson County
- Springport Township, Michigan in Jackson County
- Springport, Alcona County, Michigan, unincorporated community
- Springport, New York

== Other ==
- Springport Motor Speedway, Michigan
