= Frère =

Frère is a French surname. Notable people with the surname include:

- Albert Frère (1926–2018), Belgian businessman
- Aubert Frère (1881–1944), French general, founder of Organisation de résistance de l'armée
- Bernard-Georges-François Frère (1764-1826), French general
- Charles Edouard Frère (1837-1894), French painter, son of Pierre Edouard Frère
- Charles-Théodore Frère (1814-1886), French painter
- Édouard Frère (1797–1874), French bookseller, archivist, scholar and biographer
- Gérald Frère (born 1951), Belgian businessman, son of Albert
- Henry Bartle Frere (1815–1884), British diplomat
- John Hookham Frere (1769–1846) British diplomat, politician and writer
- Maurice Frère (died 1970), governor of the National Bank of Belgium
- Paul Frère (1917–2008), Belgian racing driver and journalist
- Pierre Edouard Frère (1819–1886), French painter, father of Charles Edouard Frère
- Théodore Frère (1814–1888), French painter

== See also ==
- Frere
- "Frère Jacques", a children's song
