= Springport Public Schools =

School district in Michigan

Address
- 300 West Main Street Springport, Jackson County, Michigan, 49284; United States

District information
- Grades: Kindergarten–12
- Superintendent: Terry Sedlar
- Schools: 3
- Budget: $15,441,000 2022-2023 expenditures
- NCES District ID: 2632610

Students and staff
- Students: 932 (2024-2025)
- Teachers: 56.45 (on an FTE basis) (2024-2025)
- Staff: 122.3 FTE (2024-2025)
- Student–teacher ratio: 16.51 (2024-2025)

Other information
- Website: www.springportschools.net

Springport Public Schools is a public school district in Southern Michigan. In Jackson County, it serves Springport, Springport Township, and parts of the townships of Parma and Tompkins. In Ingham County, it serves part of Onondaga Township. In Calhoun County, it serves parts of the townships of Clarence and Sheridan. In Eaton County, it serves parts of the townships of Brookfield and Hamlin.

== History ==
Springport's first high school building was built in 1872. It burned in 1917 and was replaced in 1918.

The town of Springport's school district consolidated with outlying rural school districts in 1940, greatly increasing enrollment at the school. By 1947, overcrowding at Springport High School meant the gymnasium had to be converted to classrooms. 270 students were being housed in temporary structures. The district had purchased 30 acres for the site of a new school, which became the site of the present campus, but had no revenue to build a proper school. To protest the lack of financial assistance from the state legislature, a tiny shack was erected on the school site and "class" was held in the shack for photographers from the newspaper.

No longer having a gymnasium of its own, the community volunteered labor and donated supplies to build one on the new school site. Its curved wood beams earned it the nickname "The Arches." It was completed in 1949 and was a source of great pride.

Springport's current school building opened in February 1963, incorporating the 1949 gymnasium. The middle school opened in fall 1971. A bond issue passed in 1997 to fund construction of renovations and a new gymnasium, while retaining the old gymnasium for use by the elementary school.

A $32.7 million bond issue passed in 2025 will fund improvements to the high school's auditorium, both gymnasiums, and other projects. The 1949 gymnasium is planned to be rebuilt, with the new structure incorporating the arches from the former gym.

== Schools ==
Springport Public Schools share a campus at 300 West Main Street in Springport. The high school and elementary school share a building while the middle school is separate.

Schools in Springport Public Schools district
School	Notes
Springport High School	Grades 9–12. Built 1963.
Springport Middle School	Grades 6–8. Built 1971.
Springport Elementary	Grades K-5. Shares a building with Springport High School.
