= Bernard Jaffe =

American chemist, historian, and writer (1896–1986)

Bernard Jaffe (March 5, 1896, in Manhattan – November 20, 1986, in Oak Bluffs, Massachusetts) was an American chemist, chemistry teacher, science journalist, and historian of science, specializing in the history of chemistry.

== Education and career ==
After secondary education in New York City, Bernard Jaffe attended the City College of New York, where he graduated in 1916 with a B.S. cum laude. During WW I he served as an officer in the 108th Infantry Regiment, 97th Infantry Division of the U.S. Army. In 1918 his regiment fought in Belgium and France. As a lieutenant, he participated in September 1918 in the U.S. Army's final operations against the Hindenberg Line. After his repatriation and discharge, he matriculated at Columbia University, where he graduated in 1922 with an M.A. in chemistry. After about 2 years of working in the business sector, he became in 1924 a high school chemistry teacher in the New York City Department of Education. In 1926, while teaching at Jamaica High School, he published Chemical Calculations. This problem book for secondary school students was successful, and a revised, 2nd edition was published in 1947. In 1930 Simon and Schuster published Jaffe's book Crucibles: The Lives of the Great Chemists, a collection of biographies of famous chemists, including Bernard of Treves, Paracelsus, Johann Joachim Becher, Joseph Priestley, Henry Cavendish, Antoine Lavoisier, Marie Curie, J. J. Thomson, Henry Moseley, and Irving Langmuir. New editions with the title Crucibles: The Story of Chemistry from Ancient Alchemy to Nuclear Fission were published in 1942, 1949, 1957, and 1976. By 1950, Crucibles was translated into Italian and Spanish. In 1935 Jaffe was appointed head of the Physical Sciences Department at Midwood, Brooklyn's Bushwick High School and his book New World of Chemistry was published by Silver, Burdett & Company. This highly successful textbook for secondary students went through new editions in 1940, 1942, and 1948. The textook took a strongly historical approach and displayed pictures of famous chemists and the use of chemistry in industry, as well as diagrams of experiments. In 1957 Crowell published Jaffe's book Chemistry Creates a New World, a book about chemistry's role in contemporary life. In Brooklyn, he taught high school chemistry until his retirement in 1958. Jaffe's books for a popular audience include Outposts of Science: A Journey to the Workshops of Our Leading Men of Research (1935); Men of Science in America: The Story of American Science Told Through the Lives and Achievements of Twenty Outstanding Men From Earliest Colonial Times to the Present Day (1944); Michelson and the Speed of Light (1960); and Moseley and the Numbering of the Elements (1971). He contributed many scientific articles and book reviews to The New York Times, the New York Herald Tribune, The New Republic, The Saturday Review of Literature, and the Journal of Chemical Education. Jaffe was a strong advocate of using the history of chemistry in the teaching of chemistry to increase interest and to improve achievement among the students.

== Awards and honors ==
In 1930 the 1st edition of Jaffe's book Crucibles won for him the Francis Bacon Award for Humanizing Knowledge, sponsored by Forum Magazine and by Simon and Schuster. At the award ceremony in New York City, John Dewey presented a gold medal and a check for $7,500 in prize money to Jaffe. In 1973, the Dexter Award of the History of Chemistry of the American Chemical Society was presented to Jaffe for his promotion of the history of chemistry in secondary school teaching of chemistry and for Crucibles and his other popular books dealing with the lives of outstanding scientists.

== Family ==
Jaffe married Celia Lesser and they had a son, Lionel F. Jaffe of Woods Hole, Massachusetts and three grandchildren including Laurinda Jaffe.

== Selected publications ==
- Chemical calculations: a systematic presentation of the solution of type problems, with 1000 chemical problems arranged progressively according to lesson assignments. New-world Science Series. Yonkers-on-Hudson, New York: World Book Company. 1926. LCCN 26013730.
  - 2nd edition. 1947. LCCN 47006294.
  - 3rd edition. 1958. LCCN 58025479.
- Crucibles: The Lives of the Great Chemists. New York: Simon & Schuster. 1930. LCCN 30016955.
  - Crucibles: The Story of Chemistry from Ancient Alchemy to Nuclear Fission. Dover. 1976. ISBN 0486233421; pbk; new revised & updated 4th edition
- New World of Chemistry. 1935. LCCN 35008008. (textbook with several later editions)
- Outposts of Science: A Journey to the Workshops of Our Leading Men of Research. 1935. LCCN 35031946.
- Men of Science in America: The Role of Science in the Growth of Our Country. Simon & Schuster. 1944. LCCN 44005618.
  - Men of Science in America: The Story of American Science Told Through the Lives and Achievements of Twenty Outstanding Men From Earliest Colonial Times to the Present Day. Simon & Schuster. 1958. LCCN 58059443; revised edition
  - 1980 edition. Arno Press. 1980. ISBN 0405125518.
- Michelson and the Speed of Light (1st ed.). Anchor Books. 1960. LCCN 60013533.
- Moseley and the Numbering of the Elements (1st ed.). Doubleday. 1971. LCCN 69015181.
- Chemistry Creates a New World. New York: Crowell. 1957. LCCN 57006569. (with an introduction by Glenn T. Seaborg; illustrations by Ava Morgan)
  - revised edition. New York: Pyramid Publications. 1962. LCCN 62003537.
