= Luray, Eure-et-Loir =

Luray
- Commune
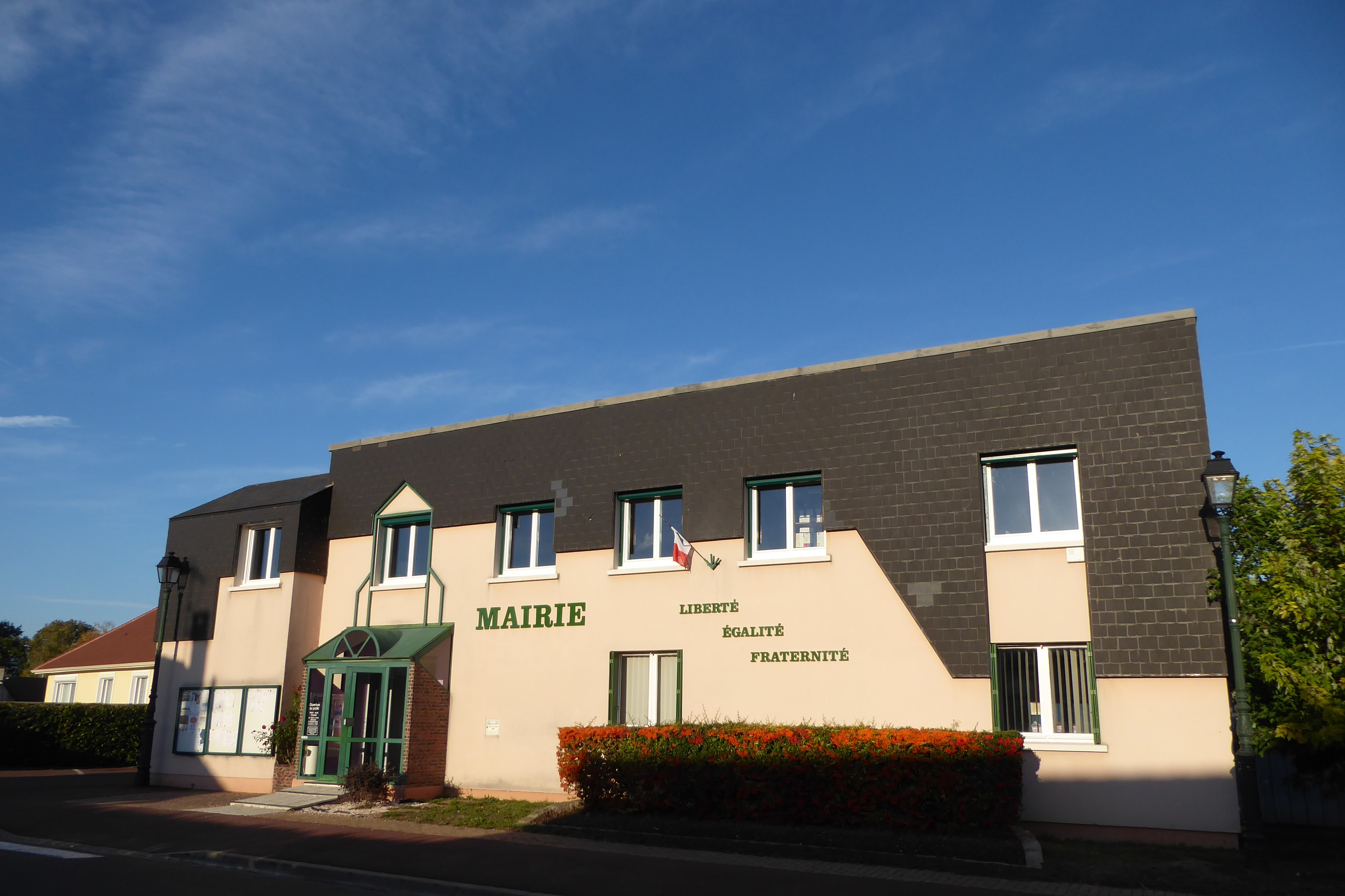
- The town hall in Luray
- Location of Luray
- Location within France Location within Centre-Val de Loire
- Coordinates: 48°43′19″N 1°23′52″E
- Country: France
- Region: Centre-Val de Loire
- Department: Eure-et-Loir
- Arrondissement: Dreux
- Canton: Dreux-2
- Intercommunality: CA Pays de Dreux

Government
  - Mayor (2022–2026): Marc Avenard
- Area^{1}: 4.46 km^{2} (1.72 sq mi)
- Elevation: 94 m (308 ft)
- Highest elevation: 137 m (449 ft)
- Lowest elevation: 81 m (266 ft)
- Population (2023): 1,566
  - Density: 351/km^{2} (909/sq mi)
- Time zone: UTC+01:00 (CET)
  - Summer (DST): UTC+02:00 (CEST)
- INSEE/Postal code: 28223 /28500
- ^{1} French Land Register data, which excludes lakes, ponds, glaciers > 1 km^{2} (0.386 sq mi or 247 acres) and river estuaries.

Luray (French pronunciation: [lyʁɛ]) is a commune in the Eure-et-Loir department in northern France.

== Population ==
Historical population
Year	Pop.	±% p.a.
1968	871	—
1975	1,020	+2.28%
1982	1,009	−0.15%
1990	1,281	+3.03%
1999	1,308	+0.23%
2007	1,491	+1.65%
2012	1,591	+1.31%
2017	1,552	−0.50%
2023	1,566	+0.15%
Source: INSEE

== Namesakes ==
Despite its small population, Luray is the eponym for the following places:

- Luray, Missouri
- Luray, Ohio
- Luray, South Carolina
- Luray, Tennessee
- Luray, Virginia, and by extension, Luray Caverns and Luray, Indiana

== See also ==
- Communes of the Eure-et-Loir department
