= James Augustus Suydam =

American painter

James A. Suydam
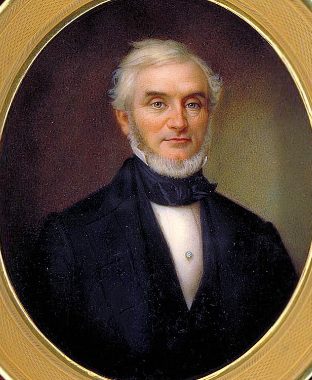
- Born: James Augustus Suydam; March 27, 1819
- Died: September 15, 1865 (aged 46); North Conway, New Hampshire
- Known for: Landscape
- Movement: Hudson River School; National Academy of Design

James Augustus Suydam (March 27, 1819 – September 15, 1865) was an American architect, lawyer, and artist; as an artist was considered one of the premier Luminism painters. He is widely known as an American landscape painter and one of the leading members of the Hudson River School.

== Family ==
James Augustus Suydam was born on March 27, 1819, and was descended from an old New York Dutch merchant family. His parents were Jane (née Mesier) Suydam and John Suydam, who was considered "one of the old Knickerbocker merchants" and was head of Suydam & Wycoff. His brothers included Henry P. M. Suydam and David Lydig Suydam. His brother, John Richard Suydam, was a principle in the firm Suydam and York. J.R. Suydam married Anne Middleton Lawrence; their daughter, Jane Mesier Suydam was named after her paternal grandmother. She later married a cousin, Walter Lispenard Suydam.

== Early life ==
James A. Suydam attended New York University (then the University of the City of New York) with the intention of pursuing a career in medicine. Upon the death of his father in 1841, James received a substantial inheritance and made a Grand Tour of the Continent the following year. Upon his return, he began his career as a businessman but turned a significant portion of his energies to painting, studying under famed artist and portrait painter Minor C. Kellogg. At the age of thirty he was elected to the Century Association. Suydam was also a member of the Saint Nicholas Society of the City of New York, and a life-member of the New York Bible Society.

One of the "regulars" who gathered to paint at North Conway, New Hampshire, he exhibited Conway Meadows at the New York Athenaeum and Boston Athenaeum. He opened his studio at the noted 10th Street Studio Building, New York City, in 1858. The following year he was elected an honorary professional member in the prestigious National Academy of Design, which granted him full membership in 1861.

He died suddenly in North Conway at the age of 46. The posthumous sale of his estate revealed that he owned works by "old masters such as Rembrandt, Dürer, Ostade, and Raphael and contemporaries including Rosa Bonheur, Ary Scheffer, and George Caleb Bingham." In his will, he left $50,000 (equivalent to $1,051,630 today) to the National Academy along with his collection of 92 paintings including works by Frederick E. Church, John F. Kensett, Charles Edouard Frère, and Andreas Achenbach.

== Paintings ==
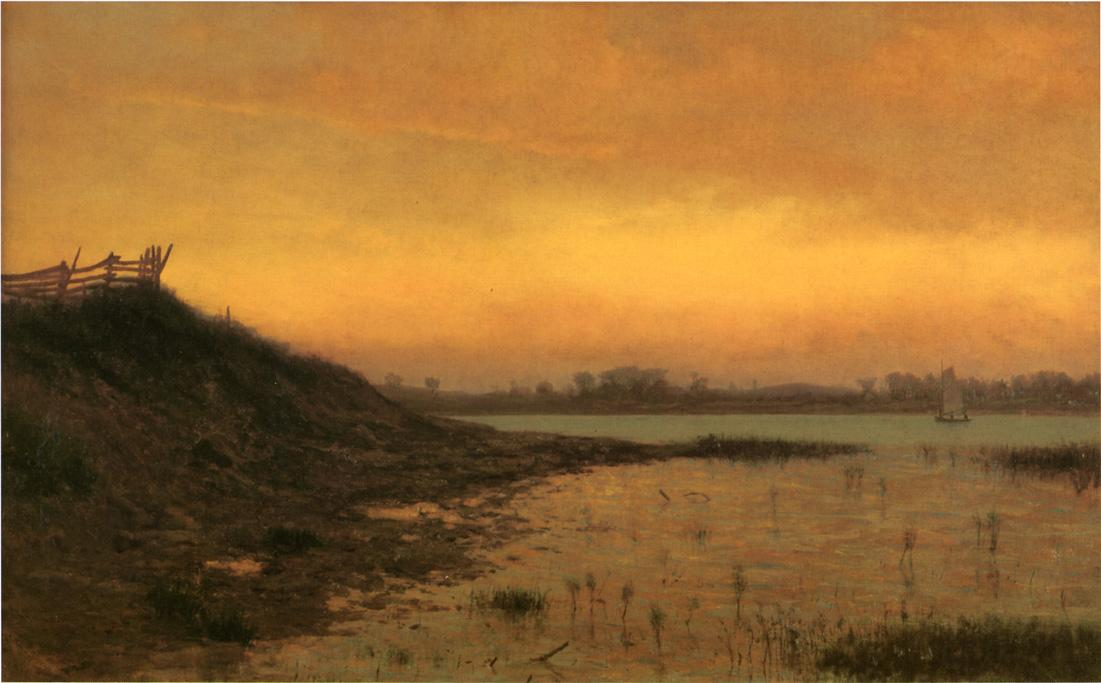
Long Island, oil on canvas, 1862.

James Suydam was described by his friend, the accomplished artist Sanford Robinson Gifford as a "thoroughly educated and accomplished man." In addition to his work as an artist, which he began only after working in law and architecture, he was widely read and well-versed in history, philosophy, and the sciences. His work as a landscape painter reflects this breadth of knowledge and reveals Suydam as a deeply spiritual individual. Using his familiarity with science, Suydam reduced nature to calm, clean, planar forms, and then distorted proportional relations so that God's creations loomed superior over the work of man.

The National Academy has most of his works such as Paradise Rocks (1865), and the Taft family's Taft Museum also holds works. The Taft also has a podcast website for this artist.

A painting of Gifford's from 1859 which Suydam, according to a report, "donated to the [National] academy in 1865," became the subject of a deaccession controversy at the Academy in late 2008.

=== Legacy ===
In 2006, a retrospective of Suydam's work was held at the National Academy Museum.
