= Clarence Center =

Clarence Center can refer to:

- Clarence Center, New York
- Clarence Center, Michigan
