= Lorinda (given name) =

Lorinda and Laurinda are female first names. Notable people with the names include:

== People ==
- Laura Cardoso (born Laurinda de Jesus Cardoso, born 1927), Brazilian actress
- Laurinda Cardoso (born 1975), Angolan lawyer
- Lorinda Cherry (1944–2022), American computer scientist
- Lorinda de Roulet (born 1931/1932), American philanthropist
- Anna Etheridge (born Lorinda Anna Blair; 1839–1913), American Civil War nurse
- Laurinda Hope Spear (born 1950), American architect
- Laurinda Jaffe (born 1952), American biologist
- Laurinda Manuel Gouveia (born 1989), Angolan human rights activist
- Lorinda Munson Bryant (1855–1933), American writer and educator
- Lorinda Panther (born 1963), New Zealand footballer
- Lorinda Perry (1884–1951), American economist, lawyer, professor

== Fictional characters ==
- Laurinda (2014), a novel by Alice Pung
