= 1836 Granville riot =

Violent incident in Ohio

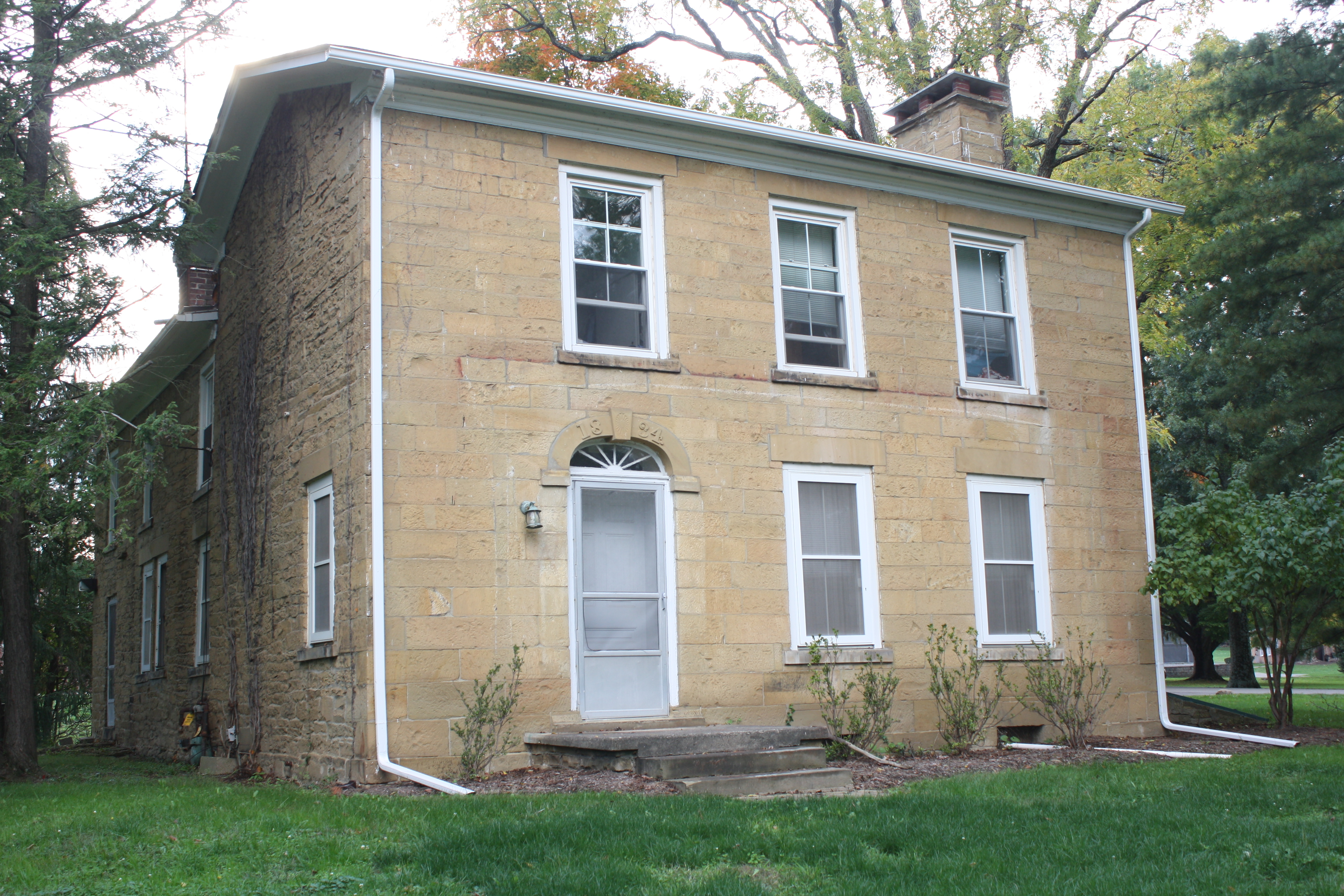
The Bancroft family home still stands today on the campus of Denison University

The Granville Riot of 1836 was a violent altercation between abolitionists and anti-abolitionists in Granville, Ohio, United States. The riot occurred after the first annual convention of the Ohio Anti-Slavery Society,which took place in Granville, a town considered a hub for the abolitionist movement and Underground Railroad operations. Even before the convention, tensions existed between abolitionist and anti-abolitionist locals, and confrontations took place before the riot itself. Following the convention, the altercation escalated to physical violence and property damage, and the riot began spilled out onto Granville's Main Street. Although the riot that occurred in Granville was not uncommon for its time, the scene caught national attention, bringing more people together to discuss the topic of slavery in the nation and is recognized in Granville as a major event defining the town's history.

== Background ==
Granville was first established by New England settlers who intended to create a New England-style community that centered around church and educational life. There was a large group of academics in the area, as there were five different colleges in the early 1830s, including the Granville Female Seminary and the Granville Literary and Theological Institution, which would later become Denison University. The founders also had strong religious values as Puritans.

Anti-slavery tensions in Ohio

The Abolitionist Movement, which called for an end to slavery in the United States, gained momentum in the 1830s. There were many tensions throughout Ohio between abolitionists and anti-abolitionists due to the mixing of New England locals and settlers coming from the Southern United States, primarily from Kentucky and Virginia. For example, tensions existed between anti-abolitionists in Zanesville, Ohio and abolitionists in Putnam, Ohio. Putnam hosted an anti-slavery convention in 1835 that resulted in a violent mob. Mob violence had become a common reaction to abolitionist ideas, both as a way to show opinions and react to pre-existing rivalries. Many of these altercations went without legal repercussions as well, making them even more likely to occur.

Abolitionist presence in Granville

In the year of 1835, Theodore Weld visited the town of Granville and many of the surrounding towns in the Licking County area. Although he was met with some opposition, there were quite a few supporters of abolitionism in Granville. The talks Weld gave throughout the year helped establish at least five anti-slavery organizations within the Licking County area.

The Ohio Anti-Slavery Society, formed in Putnam Muskingum County, opted to hold their first convention in the town of Granville in April of 1836. Many reasons contributed to this decision, but some of the main factors were the town’s academic presence, the location of the town in Central Ohio, and the growing population of abolitionists in the town.

Anti-abolitionist presence in Granville

The anti-abolitionists in Granville, led by General Augustine Munson, were a group that supported the American Colonization Society. The group's alignment with the American Colonization Society showcased their belief that as long as white and black existed in America, there would be no equality. The group believed that slavery was wrong but thought abolitionists wanted to do away with slavery unconstitutionally. They did not agree with what they thought to be harsh treatment toward southern states and slave owners. They thought it was unfair treatment because slavery was a practice carried over from England and had become a supporting factor to the southern economy. The group also believed that the southern states were within their rights to deny the Federal U.S Constitution and have slavery remain legal. Instead of doing as the abolitionists suggested, the group thought that the best solution would be to send the slaves back to Africa. However, they did not want to do so forcefully and believed they needed to inspire the slaves to want to go back on their own accord.

== Abolitionist meeting ==
The first meeting of the Ohio Anti-Slavery Society was held in the barn located on the property belonging to the Bancroft Family, descendants of the founder of Granville, Massachusetts, Samuel Bancroft. The meeting was originally supposed to occur in the village of Granville, but the society was met with opposition from Granville citizens. Not all of the citizens were in disagreement with the society's cause, but many feared the violence the meeting might bring to their village. The town issued a notice forbidding any rooms in the village from being used for the convention. This notice was signed by all of the town officials and 69 other citizens of Granville.

In light of this notice, Ashley Azariah Bancroft opened his home and barn to the convention. Bancroft initiated the meeting in the barn on his home’s property, despite the outwardly vocal pro-slavery Granvillians who expressed their disapproval of not only the meeting, but the society as a whole.

The meeting attracted many students and teachers from Granville College and Granville Female College. The convention had about 191 attendees and met over the course of Thursday, April 27 and Friday, April 28. On the first day, James Thome of Oberlin gave a speech exhorting women to "take their places by the side of men in fighting for the rights of the oppressed." On the second day, Rankin delivered a report on the duty of churches to embrace the anti-slavery cause. Delegates passed multiple resolutions, including:

- a resolution calling for non slave-holding states to discuss the subject of slavery
- a resolution requesting that the United States Congress abolish slavery and the slave trade in the nation's capital

The meeting also included business items, such as nominating delegates to attend an American Anti-Slavery Society meeting in New York, hearing reports from the executive committee and treasurer of the Ohio Anti-Slavery Society, and electing officers for the coming year.

== The riot ==
The members of the Anti-Slavery Convention were prepared and expecting some sort of protest from the anti-abolitionist citizens. The two-day long convention had an armed guard in front of the Bancroft Barn who scanned the area for potential rioters before each meeting. However, once the members left the Bancroft Barn on the second day of the convention and walked down Granville's Broadway Street, they were met with pro-slavery rioters, who were described by witnesses as being intoxicated, who began shouting, shoving, and throwing various items at the group. The abolitionists continued on their way home while the anti-abolitionist forces continued to yell and pelt eggs and stones at them.

Some of the abolitionists were women and professors of Granville Female College, who were attempting to return to their campus. They were approached by a group of Granville anti-abolitionists who began verbally assaulting and pushing them off of the street. At one point, two women and a man were shoved into a ditch. The men accompanying the women were upset and began fighting back against the anti-abolitionists. This resulted in a scuffle, with people shoving and arguing down the street. Once they reached Main Street, a violent dispute broke out between both groups. Punches and stones were thrown, causing severe injuries to the people involved and the neighboring buildings. Some men accompanied the college women back to their campus and then returned to the riot and continued fighting.

== Aftermath of the riot ==
In the days following the riot, local newspapers were filled with accounts of the riot; however, the stories only included the perspective of the abolitionists. The anti-abolitionists admitted to being too ashamed to come forward with their side of the story. The antislavery speaker, Theodore Weld, chose to travel to a nearby area, St. Alban's Township to continue his speeches. Many Granville locals who were swayed by his teachings chose to travel to see him there. Some fictionalized novellas created about people who attended the convention that showed up in newspapers much later.

Granville was later considered a popular stop for slaves seeking freedom through the Underground Railroad, many of whom stayed at the Bancroft House before fleeing to the next stop. The Bancroft House still stands on the campus of Denison University today.
