= Mary Hartwell Catherwood =

American writer

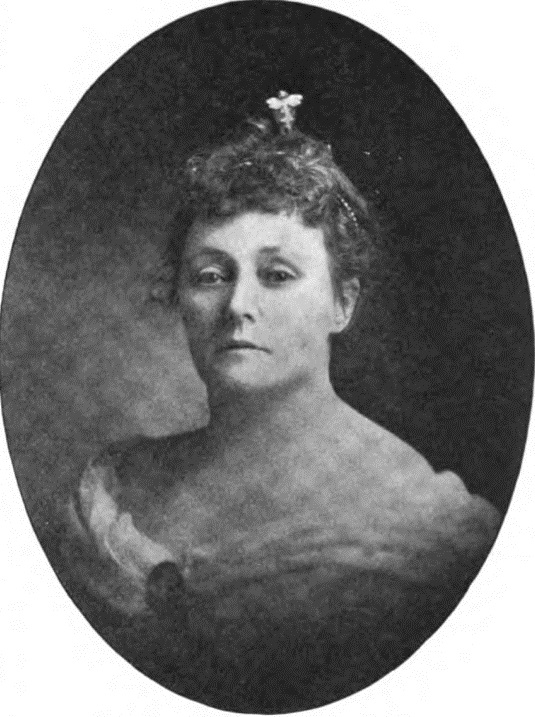
- Born: Mary Hartwell; December 16, 1847; Luray, Ohio
- Died: December 26, 1902 (aged 55); Chicago, Illinois
- Resting place: Floral Hill Cemetery, Hoopeston
- Education: Granville Female College
- Occupation: Writer
- Spouse: James Steele Catherwood
- Children: Hazel Catherwood
- Writing career
- Pen name: Mary Hartwell; Lewtrah
- Genres: Historical romance; short story; poetry

Mary Hartwell Catherwood (December 16, 1847 – December 26, 1902) was an American writer of popular historical romances, short stories, and poetry. Early in her career she published under her birth name, Mary Hartwell, and under the pseudonym Lewtrah (Hartwell spelled backwards, with the final letter dropped). She was known for setting her works in the Midwest, for a strong interest in American dialects, and for bringing a high standard of historical accuracy to the period detail of her novels.

== Family and education ==
She was born Mary Hartwell in Luray, Ohio, one of three children of Marcus Hartwell and Pheba (Thompson) Hartwell. When she was nine, her father, a physician, moved the family to Milford, Illinois. Both of her parents died shortly afterward, and Mary and her siblings were raised by their maternal grandfather in Hebron, Ohio.

Mary obtained a teacher's certificate when she was just 13 and began teaching children in local schools the following year.

Around 1865, Mary enrolled in the Granville Female College. She graduated in 1868, completing the four-year course in three years. She taught school again for a time thereafter, and in 1875 moved to Cincinnati for a year to work as a writer. She left when the economic downturn of the Long Depression damaged the market for writing.

In 1877, she married James Steele Catherwood of Hoopeston, Illinois, a businessman and later a postmaster. They had a daughter, Hazel (b. 1884). The Catherwoods lived mainly in Hoopeston, where a Mary Hartwell Catherwood Club was formed after she gained recognition as a writer. They also spent three years in Indianapolis (1879–1882). In 1899, Catherwood decided she needed to spend more time in Chicago to be nearer her publishers and for her daughter's schooling, so she took an apartment there that was her second home until she died.

== Career ==
Catherwood began sending poems and news items to the Newark (Ohio) American when she was 15, drawing the attention of the editor, who was surprised to learn how young she was. She began publishing in the paper, and shortly thereafter began publishing outside of Ohio as well. She published her poems and later her short stories in periodicals such as Lippincott's Magazine, Harper’s Magazine, and the Atlantic Monthly.

Catherwood developed a signature style of incorporating Midwestern culture, dialect, and local color into her stories and novels. Although most of her earlier stories and books are set in Ohio, Indiana, and Illinois, in the second half of her career she developed an interest in early French culture in North America, and some of her later books are set in the area along the Canada–U.S. border near Quebec and on colonial Mackinac Island. She wrote both for adults and children, and her children's books include The Dogberry Bunch (1880), Rocky Fork (1882), and Old Caravan Days (1884). With her interest in the details of locality and daily life, she is said to have helped move American juvenile literature away from the extreme sentimentality of the era.

Catherwood did a great deal of research for her historical novels, and made several research trips to Europe and Canada. The eminent historian Francis Parkman praised the historical accuracy of her novels, and she was called the "Parkman of the West". Parkman wrote a preface for The Romance of Dollard (1889).

While living in Indianapolis, she became friends with the poet James Whitcomb Riley, with whom she shared a strong interest in American dialects and whose career she helped to launch. In 1886, Catherwood joined Riley, Maurice Thompson, and several dozen others to form the Western Association of Writers.

The actor Otis Skinner turned one of her last books, Lazarre (1901), into a stage play in 1902; the cast included Nanette Comstock.

She was working on a new novel, to be titled Tippicanoe, when in 1902 she died of cancer in Chicago, Illinois. She was buried in Floral Hill Cemetery in Hoopeston. Her papers are held by the Newberry Library in Chicago and the Ohioana Library in Columbus.

== Selected publications ==
- A Woman in Armor (1875, as Mary Hartwell) (HathiTrust)
- The Dogberry Bunch (1879) (HathiTrust)
- Craque-o'-Doom (1881) (HathiTrust)
- Rocky Fork (1883) (HathiTrust)
- Old Caravan Days (1884) (HathiTrust)
- The Secrets at Roseladies (1888) (HathiTrust)
- The Romance of Dollard (1889) (HathiTrust)
- The Story of Tonty (1890) (HathiTrust)
- The Lady of Fort St. John (1892) (HathiTrust)
- White Islander (1893) (HathiTrust)
- Old Kaskaskia (1893) (HathiTrust)
- Chase of Saint-Castin and Other Stories of the French in the New World (1894) (HathiTrust)
- The Days of Jeanne d'Arc (1897) (HathiTrust)
- The Spirit of an Illinois Town (107 pages) and The Little Renault (46 pages), (1897)
- The Queen of the Swamp, and Other Plain Americans (1899) (HathiTrust)
- Mackinac and Lake Stories (1899) (HathiTrust)
- Spanish Peggy (1899) (HathiTrust)
- Heroes of the Middle West (1901) (HathiTrust)
- Lazarre (1901; illustrations by André Castaigne) (HathiTrust)

== See also ==
- Constance Fenimore Woolson
