= Lorinda =

Lorinda may refer to:

- Lorinda (given name)
- SS Lorinda, an Empire ship
