= Springport High School =

School

Location
- 300 West Main Street; Springport, (Jackson County), Michigan 49284; United States
- Coordinates: 42.3774°N 84.7039°W

Information
- Type: Public high school
- School district: Springport Public Schools
- Principal: Christopher P. Kregel
- Staff: 15.70 (FTE)
- Enrollment: 303 (2022-23)
- Student to teacher ratio: 19.30
- Colors: Royal blue and white
- Athletics conference: Big 8 Conference
- Nickname: Spartans

Springport High School is a high school in Springport, Michigan, United States.

== History ==
In 2018, a graduate of Springport High School was one of 168 students in the United States recognized as Presidential Scholars.
