= Springport Mid-Michigan Speedway =

Raceway

Coordinates: 42.419148°N 84.721413°W

Lil' M.I.S.
- Location: Clarence Township, Calhoun County, at 23845 30 Mile Rd, Springport, Michigan 49284
- Capacity: 5,300
- Broke ground: 1988
- Opened: 1989
- Former names: Calhoun County Speedway, Michigan Ideal Speedway, Springport Speedway, Mid-Michigan Speedway, Springport Motor Speedway
- Major events: Michigan Cup, The First Call
- Website: SpringportRacing.com

High Banked Oval
- Surface: Asphalt
- Length: 0.37 mi (0.6 km)
- Turns: 4
- Banking: Turns - 18 degrees Frontstretch - 8 degrees Backstretch - 15 degrees

SMS Pony Race

Michigan Cup 2007 Pits

Michigan Cup 2007 Race

Springport Mid-Michigan Speedway is a 3/8th mile, high-banked, oval short track located northwest of Springport, Michigan.

Springport Mid-Michigan Speedway opened in the fall of 1989 under the name of Michigan Ideal Speedway. Built to replicate the dimensions of Michigan International Speedway, but on a 3/8th mile scale.

Seating 5300 spectators at maximum capacity, the track sits in the countryside of Calhoun County, a 45-minute drive from the Irish Hills and Michigan International Speedway.

== History ==
Springport Mid-Michigan Speedway opened in the fall of 1989 under the name of Michigan Ideal Speedway.

Michigan Ideal Speedway was the dream of Russ Densmore. Densmore owned a local propane company in Springport, Michigan, and he was on the fire and safety crew at Michigan International Speedway. In 1988 Russ Densmore was the fire crew chief at Spartan Speedway, a position he had held in previous seasons under the ownership of Paul Zimmerman. After an evening of racing, Densmore and new Spartan owner Russ Cowper (Cowper also owned the Galeburg Speedway) had a conflict over some facet of track operation, Mr. Cowper challenged Densmore "If you think you know so much about running a race track, why don't you go get your own".

Mr. Densmore purchased 68-acre (280,000 m^{2}) farm & farm house in the extreme North East corner of Calhoun County and build his dream short track and called it Michigan Ideal Speedway.

One of the major contractors/builders was also a local racer named Jim "Barney" Barnhardt. Not only did Barney help build the track, he was the first ever driver to take a race car onto the speedway and held the track record for 6 years. He was also the first driver to wreck a car on the speedway.

During the first race on that fall afternoon, Bill Tyler was given the first upside down trophy (it was more of a nose stand in the first turn). He went on to win the sprint feature that day. Other winners from the first race were: Late Models - Joe Dorer and Charlie Evens, Mini Champs - Andy Michner, IMCA Modifieds - Dan Bailey, Factory Stocks - Tim West, Pro Stocks - John Smalley, Ed Santora, and Dick Margo.

No season champions were crowned in 1989 as only one race was held.

In 1990, the first Late Model Champion was Jeff Finley.

In 1998, Russ Densmore sold the track to an ownership group out of Jackson, Michigan headed by Ronnie Johncox. Ronnie Johncox was an Indy Car owner and driver who was participating on the Indy Car Series at the time of purchase.

Johncox operated and promoted the track for two seasons until he closed the track after the 2000 season due to financial issues. The track remained closed for the 2001, '02 and '03 race seasons.

In 2003, the track was purchased by Spartan Speedway owners Paul Zimmerman and Jim Leasure, and the track re-opened for the 2004 season as "Calhoun County Speedway".

In 2005, the track started the season as Calhoun County Speedway. During the season the name of the facility was changed to Springport Mid-Michigan Speedway.

In 2006 the track was promoted by local racing legend Gary Fedewa (along with Spartan Speedway) but again, financial issues closed the track early, in August.

In 2007 Zimmerman/Leasure leased the track to local racer and businessmen Maurice Randall. Randall was formerly a NASCAR and ARCA driver. Track successfully completed the season, but for 2008, track ownership decided not to lease the track out and instead operate it themselves.

The 2008 season was completed in full and at the conclusion of the season the track was sold/leased to Jerry Rabbers. Rabbers changed the name of the track to "Mid-Michigan Speedway" and launched an ambitious schedule and payout. In July 2009, the track suspended operations and in August ownership/operation reverted to Leasure.

In 2010 and 2011 the track was successfully leased and operated by Steve Martin. The Springport Mid-Michigan Speedway website http://www.springportracing.com is full of information for the current season.

== Notable alumni ==
Bill Elliott, Sarah Fisher, Sarah McCune, Stephen Leicht, Mike Buckley, Kenny Irwin, David Stremme, Ryan Newman.

== Track timeline ==
- 1989 : Track opens under owner Russ Densmore as Michigan Ideal Speedway.
- 1989 : Track announcer is Mick Shuler
- 1991 : Track runs on Sunday Nights for the 1991 season
- 1991 : First Annual Michigan Cup Held
- 1999 : Track sold to ownership group led by Ronnie Johncox and operated as Springport Speedway
- 2001 - 2003 : Track was dormant
- 2003 : Track sold to Paul Zimmerman & Jim Leasure and operated as Calhoun County Speedway
- 2005 : Track operated as Springport Mid-Michigan Speedway
- 2009 : Track was leased to Jerry Rabbers and operated as Mid-Michigan Speedway
- 2010 : Track was leased to Steve Martin, the named returned to Springport Mid-Michigan Speedway
- 2011 : The first full-time season Outlaw late models returned to the track since 2004 The Modified's returned full-time since 2006
- 2012 - 2015 : Springport Mid-Michigan Speedway was leased to Jeff & Pam Parish (former Whittemore Speedway, Owosso Speedway, Dixie Motor Speedway, Promoters)
- 2016–Present : Springport Mid-Michigan Speedway was purchased by brothers John & Curt Ainsworth and the name changed to Springport Mid-Michigan Speedway

== Current special events ==
- Michigan Cup
- The First Call

== Track records ==
- Winged Sprint Car:
- Non Winged Spring Car:
- Super Late Model:
- Late Model:
- Sportsman:
- Modified:
- Outlaw Modified:
- Street Stock:
- RWD Pure Stock: Kyle Drake 18.754 - (2008)
- FWD Pure Stock:
- Outlaw FWD Pony Stock: Gavin McGuffey - 17.129 (2022)
- FWD Pony Stock:

== Track champions ==
'08 Champions (l to r) Brian Jenks, Earl Miles, Scott Sigman, Matt Patrick, Todd Metz Sr.

'07 Champions (l to r) Russ Potter IV, Mike Ammerman, Dennis O'Neil, Jon Smith

Year and Class	Super Late Model ^^	Sportsman ~	Street Stock	Modifieds (IMCA/MMA)	V8 Pure Stock ~~	V6 FWDs	Pony Stock
2009	n/a	n/a	n/a	n/a	n/a	n/a	n/a
2008	n/a	#47 Scott Sigman	n/a	#73 Earl Miles	#25 Matt Patrick	#9 Bryan Jenks	#62 Todd Metz Sr.
2007	n/a	#16 Mike Ammerman	n/a	n/a	#51 Jon Smith	#10 Russ Potter IV	#95 Dennis O'Neil
2006	n/a	n/a	#3 Walt Obrinske	#55 Larry Wallace	#13 Wayne Parkhurst II	#10 Russ Potter IV	#99 Brent McCort
2005	n/a	n/a	#18 Bubber Patrick	#73 Earl Miles	n/a	n/a	#17 T.J. Conroy
2004	#70 Harry Foote Jr.	n/a	#97 Ben Hidy	#2 Jim Butler	n/a	n/a	#11 Kenny Clark
2003	Track Closed	Track Closed	Track Closed	Track Closed	Track Closed	Track Closed	Track Closed
2002	Track Closed	Track Closed	Track Closed	Track Closed	Track Closed	Track Closed	Track Closed
2001	Track Closed	Track Closed	Track Closed	Track Closed	Track Closed	Track Closed	Track Closed
2000	#43 Brian Huntley	n/a	#98 Jeff Houghton	#31 Lanny Clawson	n/a	n/a	n/a
1999	#81 Tom Hernly Jr	n/a	#98 Jeff Houghton	#37 Gary Sherman	n/a	n/a	n/a
1998	Data Needed	#21 David Goostrey	#007 Dale Lewis	#27 Nyle Weiler	Data Needed	n/a	n/a
1997	#27 Torch Osterhouse	Data Needed	Data Needed	#3 Stevie Smith	Data Needed	n/a	n/a
1996	#3 John Dunivan ^^	#7 John McNett	Jeff Houghton	#15 Dennis Anscombe ^	n/a	n/a	
1995	Data Needed	Data Needed	Data Needed	#65 Chuck Olson	Data Needed	n/a	n/a
1994	#73 Earl Miles ^^	Jon Nelson	Steve Utley ~~	#25 Greg Taylor	Data Needed	n/a	n/a
1993	John Dunivon ^^	Jon Nelson	n/a	#35 Johnny Logan	Mike Logan	n/a	n/a
1992	n/a	Ron Heeney	Chip Garlock	#49 Dave Mingus	n/a	n/a	n/a
1991	Brian Huntley	Ron Heeney ~	Doug Drake ~~	#911 Dick Maurer	Data Needed	n/a	n/a
1990	#42 Jeff Finley	Data Needed	Data Needed	#111 Don Gaier	Data Needed	n/a	n/a

- n/a : Non Applicable; Class not run that season
- ^ : ICAR class rules
- ^^ : Limited Late Model rules
- ~ : Pro Stock rules
- ~~ : Michigan Iron, Ideal Iron rules
