= Théodore Frère =

French painter (1814–1888)

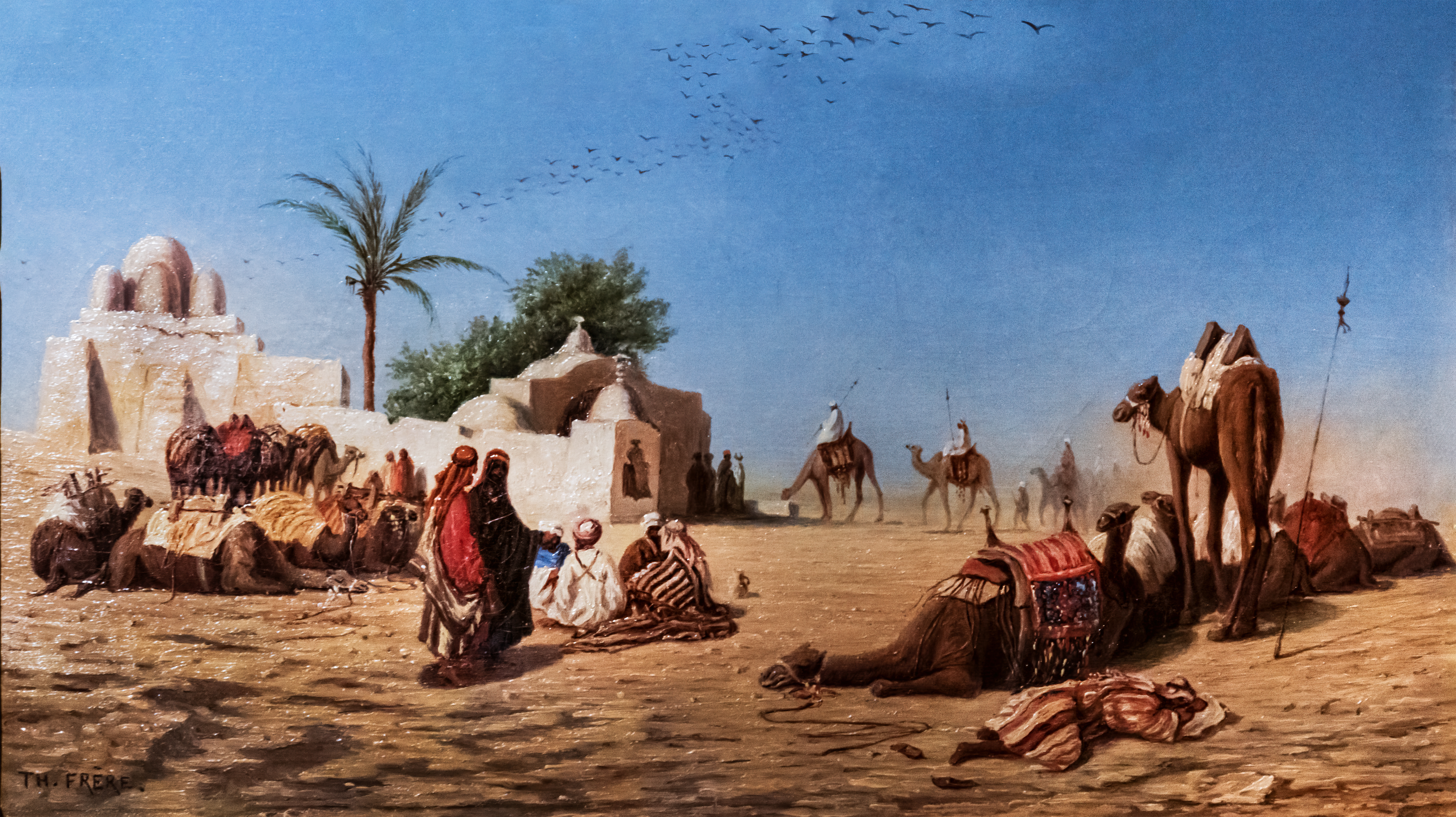
The camel drivers' halt at the caravansera

Charles-Théodore Frère (21 June 1814, Paris – 24 March 1888) was a French Orientalist painter. His younger brother, Pierre-Édouard, and his nephew and namesake, Charles Edouard Frère, were also painters.

== Biography ==
Painter of historical subjects, genre scenes, local scenes, landscapes (with figures) and seascapes; watercolourist and draughtsman. Orientalist.

The son of a Paris music publisher, Frère studied at the École des Beaux-Arts under Léon Cogniet and Camille Roqueplan.

On completing his studies, he travelled throughout France visiting Alsace - where in Schlestadt (1871-1918/19 Schlettstadt, since 1920 Sélestat) he did probably his most early work among the today still existing and known works, maybe even his real earliest work (his debut), a little pencil drawing showing a rural farmhouse, signed (TH. FRÈRE), dated (1833) and entitled (Schlestadt) -, Auvergne and Normandy.

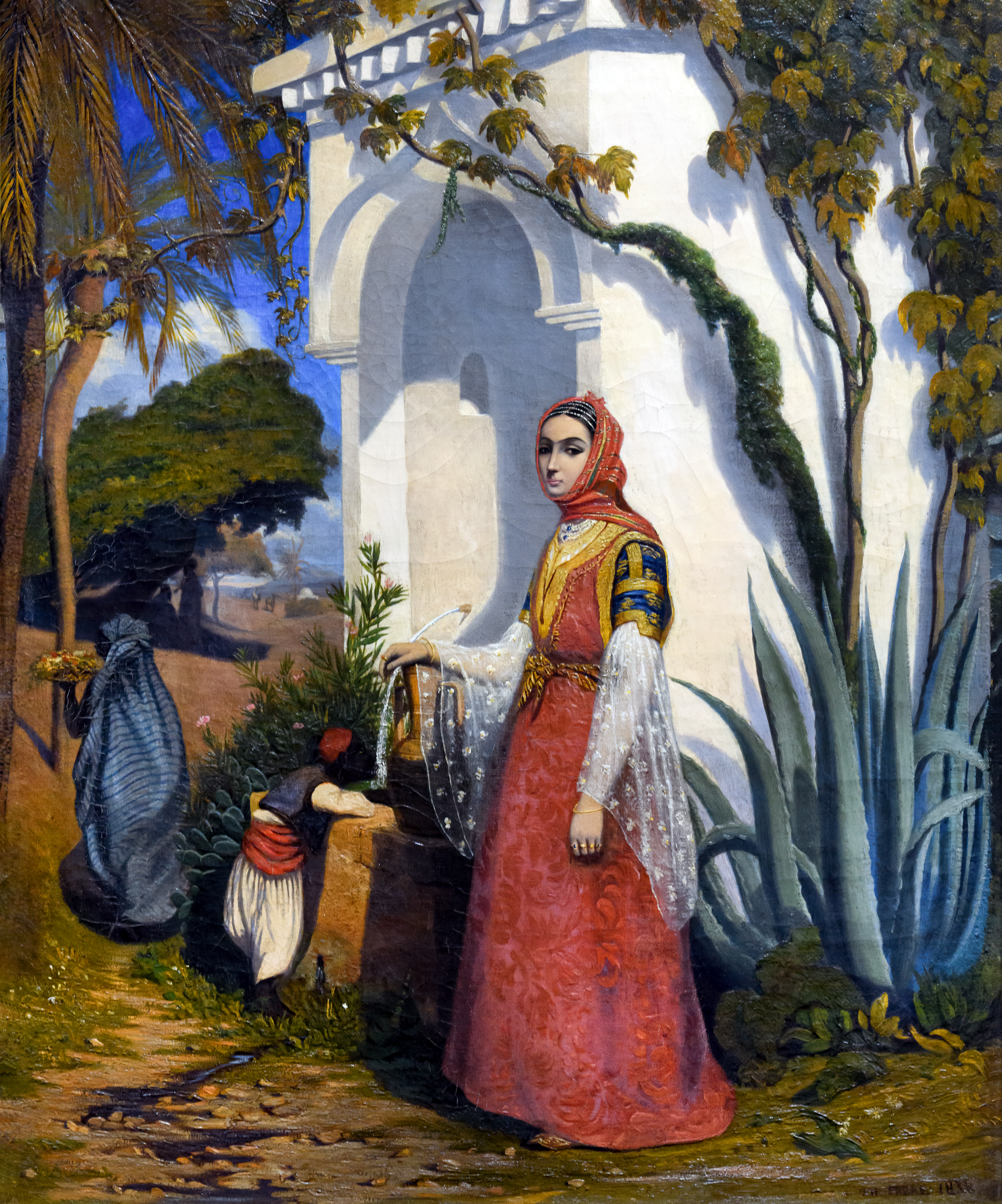
Oriental woman at the fountain, 1838

On returning to Paris, he exhibited Vue des Environs de Strasbourg at the 1834 Paris Salon. His exhibits at the Salon in subsequent years were nearly all Orientalist paintings as a result of several journeys to Africa and the Near East. Charles Théodore Frère exhibited at the Paris Salon from 1834 to 1881, participated in the Expositions Universelles of 1855, 1867 and 1878 in Paris and, up to and including 1887, in the Salon des Artistes Français. He was awarded medals in 1848 and in 1865.

After a stay in Algiers in 1836, he left with the army for Constantine which was taken on 13 October 1837, returning to Paris in 1839. During his first trip to Algeria, he completed works for the King of Württemberg. Around 1851, he undertook a further journey to the Near East, visiting Malta, Greece, Egypt and Turkey becoming one of the few artists to paint Beirut, Damascus and Palmyra. In 1853, he established a studio in Cairo, becoming the court painter there. The viceroy of Egypt elevated him to the rank of bey.

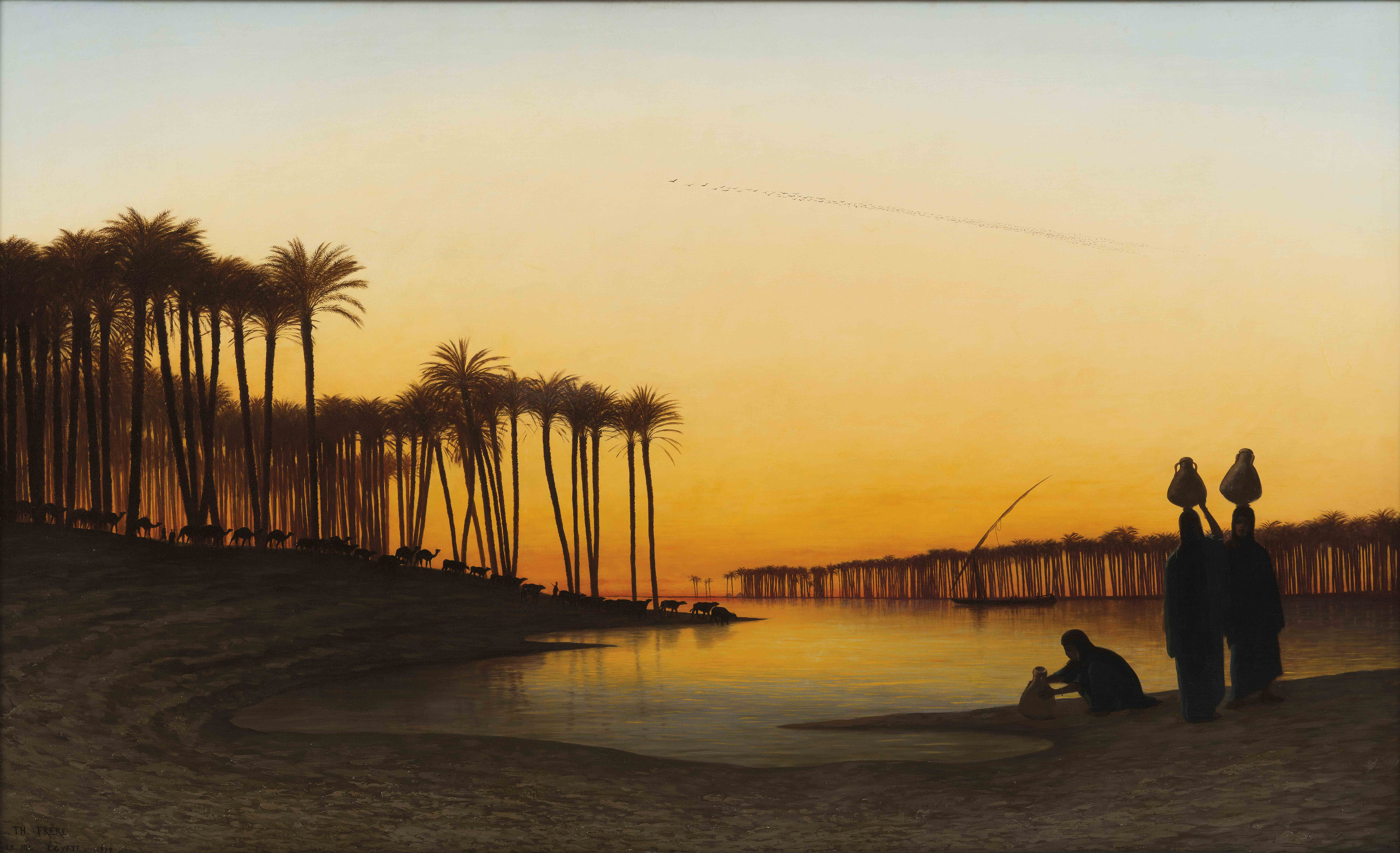
Sunset on the Nile

In 1869, he once again travelled to the Egypt, now as a member of Empress Eugénie's party, for the opening of the Suez Canal. She commissioned a series of watercolours which could not be delivered to her owing to the 1870 Franco-Prussian War. Instead they were given to her friend and pupil, the Marquis of Puisaye.

His painting "SUNSET ON THE NILE, 1877" has been exhibited at the Paris Salon of 1877 (Cat. Nr. 872), Collection Berko Fine Paintings - Belgium.

== Selected works ==
- Vue de la Ville de Constantine (1841)
- La Prise de Constantine (1843)
- The temple of Philae
- Vue de la Mosquée Sidi Abd-Er-Raham
- Scène de marché au Caire (1864)
- Le café Jalata à Contantinople (1865)
- l’Ile de Philae (1865)
- Scène de rue au Caire (1869)
- Jérusalem vue de la vallée de Jéhosafat (c. 1881)
- Sunset on the Nile (c. 1877)
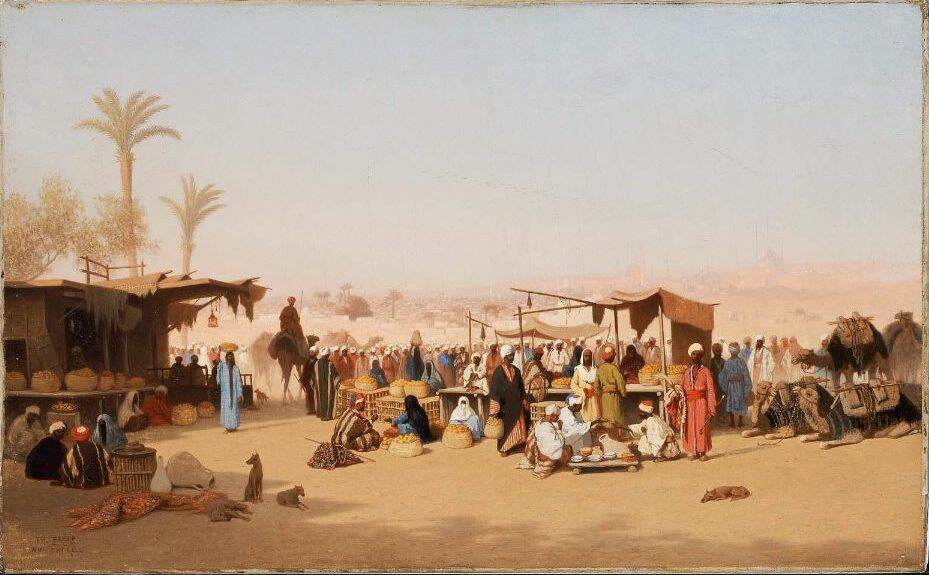
Market scene in Cairo (1864)

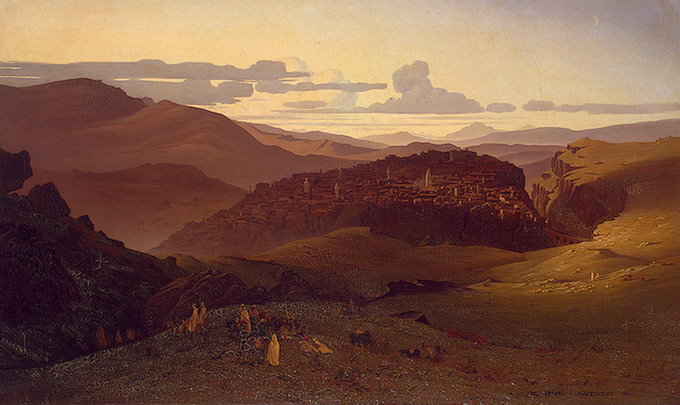
View of Constantine (1841)

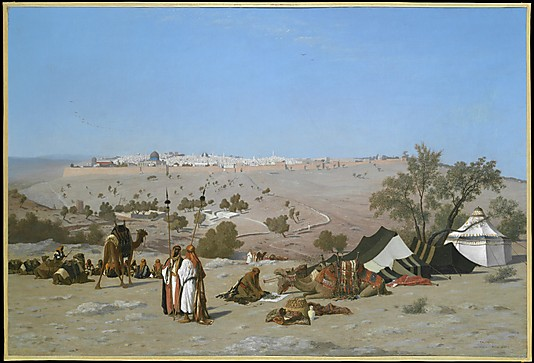
Jerusalem seen from the Valley of Jehoshaphat (c. 1881)

== Sources and bibliography ==
- Clarence Cook, Art et Artistes de notre temps, 1888.
- Charles Stranahan, Histoire de la peinture française, New York, Charles Scriner, 1888, p. 228.
- Lorinda Munson Bryant, Images et peintres français, London, T Fischer Unwin., 1923, p. 111.
- J. R. Soubiran, Le Paysage Provençal et l’École de Marseille avant les Impressionnistes, 1845-1874, Musée de Toulon, 1992, pp. 94–95.
- Dictionnaire Bénézit, Gründ, Paris, 1999.
- Marion Vidal-Bué, L’Algérie des peintres, Éditions Paris-Méditerranée, 2002, pp. 144–7.
- Elisabeth Cazenave, L’Afrique du Nord révélée par les Musées de Province, Edt, Bernard Giovangeli Association Abd el Tif, 2004, p. 49 and p. 483.
- Catherine Granger, L’Empereur et les arts, la liste civile de Napoléon III, Edt de l’École des Chartes, 2005, p. 866.
- Ministère de l'Instruction Publique et des Beaux-Arts; Direction des Beaux-Arts, Salon de 1877; 94e exposition officielle depuis l'année 1673, Paris 1877, Cat. Nr. 872.
