= Michigan Cup =

Coordinates: 42.419148°N 84.721413°W

The Michigan Cup is an annual Street Stock Invitation Race held at Springport Motor Speedway each late-summer/fall. This open ruled Invitational race invites all makes and models of rear wheel drive V-8 powered short track street stock cars to a 3-day special event to crown the King Street Stock of Michigan. Springport Motor Speedway with a capacity of 6500 spectators, the Michigan Cup sees over 200 participants annually.
