= Cornelia W. Conant =

American painter

- Born: ca. 1840-1850
- Known for: Painting; Writing

Cornelia W. Conant (born ca. 1840–1850) was an American painter and writer.

She was on the membership committee of the Brooklyn Arts Club in 1894 and showed works at the Brooklyn Art Association and the National Academy of Design. She was also a writer who wrote about a study trip to Belgium in a piece for Harper's Magazine, featuring the school run by the painter Pierre Édouard Frère.

Her painting The End of the Story was included in the 1905 book Women Painters of the World.

== Gallery ==
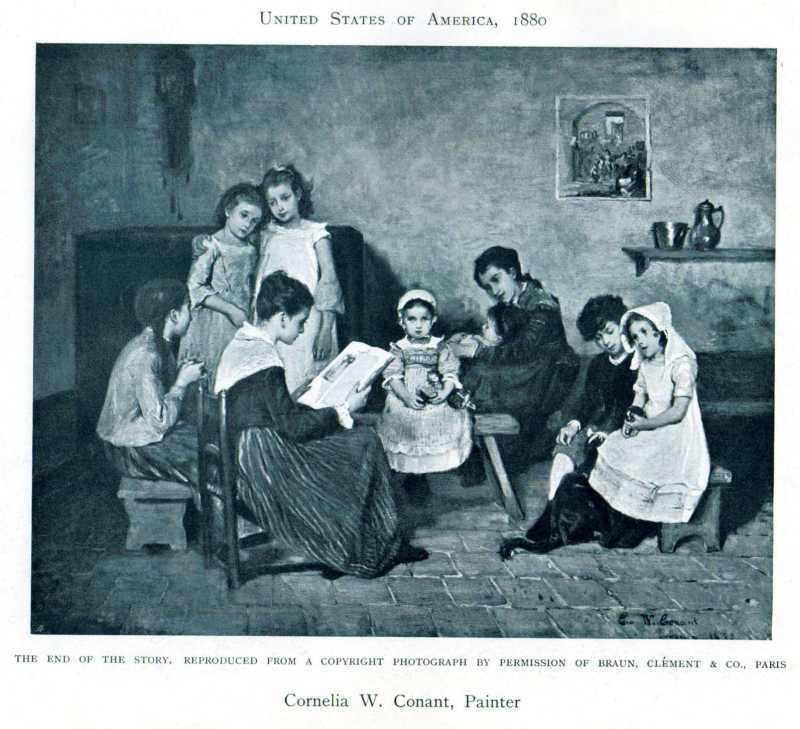
The End of the Story
