= Prairie Township, Henry County, Indiana =

Prairie Township
- Township
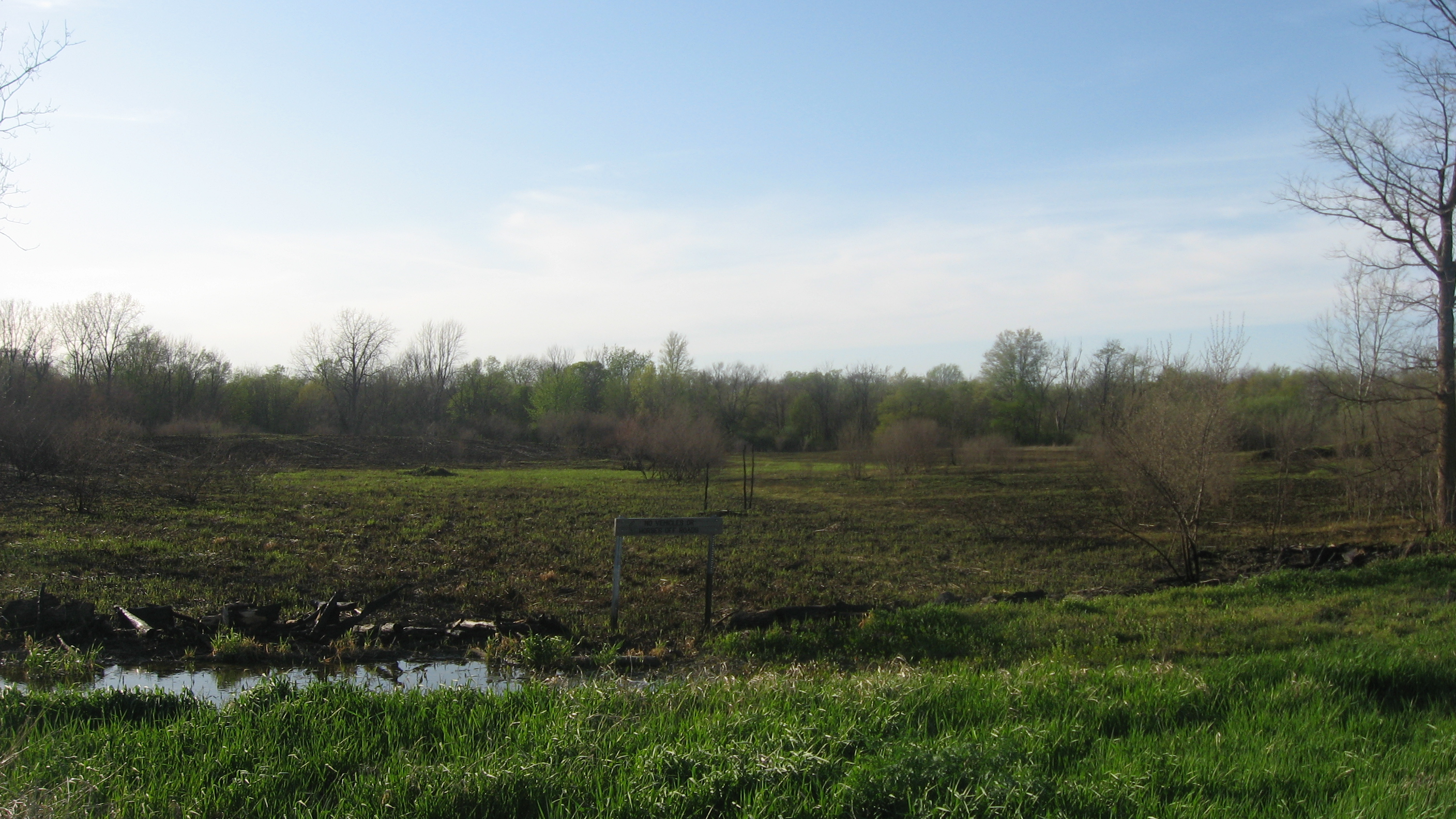
- Fields at the Wilbur Wright State Fish and Wildlife Area

- Location in Henry County
- Coordinates: 40°01′02″N 85°21′17″W
- Country: United States
- State: Indiana
- County: Henry

Government
  - Type: Indiana township

Area
  - Total: 40.73 sq mi (105.5 km^{2})
  - Land: 39.74 sq mi (102.9 km^{2})
  - Water: 0.99 sq mi (2.6 km^{2}) 2.43%
- Elevation: 1,047 ft (319 m)

Population (2020)
  - Total: 5,999
  - Density: 138.8/sq mi (53.6/km^{2})
- GNIS feature ID: 0453768

Prairie Township is one of thirteen townships in Henry County, Indiana, United States. As of the 2010 census, its population was 5,517 and it contained 1,346 housing units.

== Geography ==
According to the 2010 census, the township has a total area of 40.73 square miles (105.5 km^{2}), of which 39.74 square miles (102.9 km^{2}) (or 97.57%) is land and 0.99 square miles (2.6 km^{2}) (or 2.43%) is water. The streams of Aqua Run, Battle Brook, Brave Run, Brown Run, Brown Run, Cemetery Run, Chief Run, Colony Creek, Green Run, Harvey Run, Hillside Brook, Lavender Run, Lick Branch, Little Buck Creek, Moon Brook, Moonshine Run, Mount Run, Port Run, Red Brook, Red Run, Slo Run, Small Branch, Spring Run, Summit Brook and Yellow Run run through this township.

=== Cities and towns ===
- Mount Summit
- Springport

=== Unincorporated towns ===
- Fayne Siding
- Foley
- Hillsboro
- Luray
- Rogersville

(This list is based on USGS data and may include former settlements.)

=== Adjacent townships ===
- Monroe Township, Delaware County (north)
- Perry Township, Delaware County (northeast)
- Blue River Township (east)
- Stoney Creek Township (east)
- Liberty Township (southeast)
- Henry Township (south)
- Jefferson Township (west)

=== Cemeteries ===
The township contains six retired cemeteries: Beech Grove, Harvey, Lebanon, Livezey, Evans and Powers.

=== Major highways ===
- U.S. Route 36
- Indiana State Road 3
- Indiana State Road 103
