= Albion Landing, Michigan =

- Unincorporated community
- Location within the state of Michigan
- Coordinates: 42°22′55″N 84°47′3″W
- Country: United States
- State: Michigan
- County: Calhoun
- Township: Clarence
- Elevation: 928 ft (283 m)
- Time zone: UTC-5 (Eastern (EST))
  - Summer (DST): UTC-4 (EDT)
- GNIS feature ID: 1617408

Albion Landing is an unincorporated community in northeastern Calhoun County in the U.S. state of Michigan. Albion Landing is in Clarence Township on the southeast shore of Duck Lake at 42°22′55″N 84°47′03″W about ten miles north of Albion and about twelve miles south of Charlotte, Michigan (a place named Charlotte Landing was located just north of Albion Landing on Duck Lake).

Albion Landing, along with all of Clarence Township, is part of the Battle Creek, Michigan Metropolitan Statistical Area.

The area was sold in 1919 to the Albion-Duck Lake Improvement Association and summer cottages were built along the lake. In 1948, the area was platted and an access road built (which developed into Country Club Lane). The area is now more commonly known today as simply Duck Lake, the site of many luxury homes. The Duck Lake Country Club is located nearby.
