= Hillsboro, Henry County, Indiana =

- Unincorporated community
- Location within Indiana Location within the United States
- Coordinates: 39°58′05″N 85°19′54″W
- Country: United States
- State: Indiana
- County: Henry
- Township: Prairie
- Elevation: 1,070 ft (330 m)
- ZIP code: 47362
- FIPS code: 18-33880
- GNIS feature ID: 436215

Hillsboro is an unincorporated community in Prairie Township, Henry County, Indiana. It was formerly known as Dan Webster.

== History ==
Hillsboro was platted in 1831. The town was named for its lofty elevation. The post office Hillsboro once contained had the name Dan Webster. (Another Indiana post office already had the name of Hillsboro.) This post office operated from 1851 until 1867. A woolen factory was built on the south side of Hillsboro on the Little Blue River in 1840 and replaced with a larger one in 1852, selling yarn, cloth, and blankets.
