= Springport, Indiana =

- Town
- Location of Springport in Henry County, Indiana.
- Coordinates: 40°02′50″N 85°23′33″W
- Country: United States
- State: Indiana
- County: Henry
- Township: Prairie

Area
  - Total: 0.12 sq mi (0.31 km^{2})
  - Land: 0.12 sq mi (0.31 km^{2})
  - Water: 0 sq mi (0.00 km^{2})
- Elevation: 1,047 ft (319 m)

Population (2020)
  - Total: 131
  - Estimate (2025): 144 ▲
  - Density: 1,089.0/sq mi (420.47/km^{2})
- Time zone: UTC-5 (Eastern (EST))
  - Summer (DST): UTC-4 (EDT)
- ZIP code: 47386
- Area code: 765
- FIPS code: 18-72332
- GNIS feature ID: 2397676

Springport is a town in Prairie Township, Henry County, Indiana, United States. The population was 131 at the 2020 census.

== History ==
Springport was platted in 1868 when the Fort Wayne, Muncie and Cincinnati Railroad was extended to that point. The town took its name from springs near the railroad station. A post office has been in operation in Springport since 1869.

Springport Christian Church, founded in 1904, is currently the largest building in town.

== Geography ==
According to the 2010 census, Springport has a total area of 0.12 square miles (0.31 km^{2}), all land.

== Demographics ==
Historical population
Census	Pop.	Note	%±
1880	118		—
1920	139		—
1930	183		31.7%
1940	189		3.3%
1950	217		14.8%
1960	253		16.6%
1970	236		−6.7%
1980	221		−6.4%
1990	194		−12.2%
2000	174		−10.3%
2010	149		−14.4%
2020	131		−12.1%
2025 (est.)	144	▲	9.9%
U.S. Decennial Census

=== 2010 census ===
As of the census of 2010, there were 149 people, 61 households, and 41 families living in the town. The population density was 1,241.7 inhabitants per square mile (479.4/km^{2}). There were 72 housing units at an average density of 600.0 per square mile (231.7/km^{2}). The racial makeup of the town was 96.6% White and 3.4% from two or more races.

There were 61 households, of which 27.9% had children under the age of 18 living with them, 57.4% were married couples living together, 6.6% had a female householder with no husband present, 3.3% had a male householder with no wife present, and 32.8% were non-families. 29.5% of all households were made up of individuals, and 13.1% had someone living alone who was 65 years of age or older. The average household size was 2.44 and the average family size was 3.02.

The median age in the town was 41.2 years. 22.8% of residents were under the age of 18; 9.5% were between the ages of 18 and 24; 22.8% were from 25 to 44; 31.6% were from 45 to 64; and 13.4% were 65 years of age or older. The gender makeup of the town was 43.0% male and 57.0% female.

=== 2000 census ===
As of the census of 2000, there were 174 people, 63 households, and 53 families living in the town. The population density was 1,309.1 inhabitants per square mile (505.4/km^{2}). There were 65 housing units at an average density of 489.0 per square mile (188.8/km^{2}). The racial makeup of the town was 98.28% White, 0.57% Pacific Islander, and 1.15% from two or more races. Hispanic or Latino of any race were 3.45% of the population.

There were 63 households, out of which 34.9% had children under the age of 18 living with them, 68.3% were married couples living together, 9.5% had a female householder with no husband present, and 14.3% were non-families. 11.1% of all households were made up of individuals, and 1.6% had someone living alone who was 65 years of age or older. The average household size was 2.76 and the average family size was 2.91.

In the town, the population was spread out, with 27.0% under the age of 18, 8.0% from 18 to 24, 27.6% from 25 to 44, 27.0% from 45 to 64, and 10.3% who were 65 years of age or older. The median age was 36 years. For every 100 females, there were 114.8 males. For every 100 females age 18 and over, there were 104.8 males.

The median income for a household in the town was $43,125, and the median income for a family was $32,188. Males had a median income of $39,167 versus $32,813 for females. The per capita income for the town was $17,217. About 8.5% of families and 9.6% of the population were below the poverty line, including 12.0% of those under the age of eighteen and 17.4% of those 65 or over.
