= Pierre Édouard Frère =

French painter

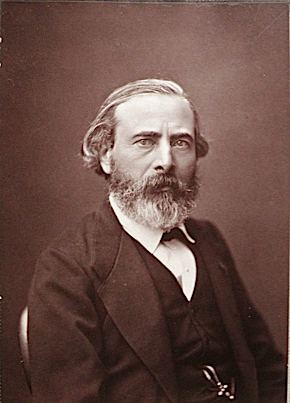
Pierre Édouard Frère (1877)

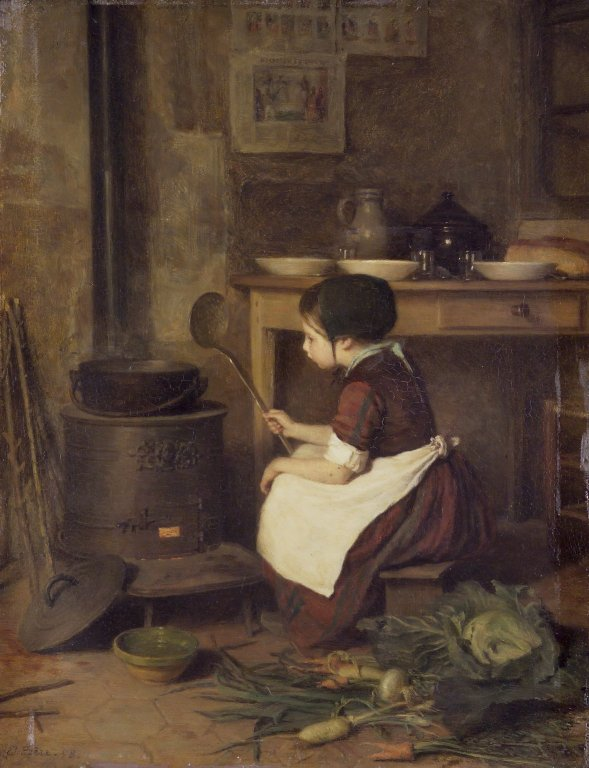
Pierre Édouard Frère, The Little Cook, ca. 1858, oil on panel, 30.8 × 23.5 cm. Brooklyn Museum

Pierre Édouard Frère (10 January 1819, Paris – 23 May 1886 Écouen), was a French genre painter.

== Biography ==
Frère studied under Paul Delaroche, entered the École des Beaux-Arts in 1836 and exhibited first at the Salon in 1843. Among his chief works are the two paintings, Going to School and Coming from School, The Little Glutton (his first exhibited picture) and L'Exercice (in the 19th century this work was in John Jacob Astor's collection).

A journey to Egypt in 1860 resulted in a small series of Orientalist subjects, but the majority of Frère's paintings deal with the life of the kitchen, the workshop, the dwellings of the humble, and mainly with the pleasures and little troubles of the young, which the artist brings before us with humor and sympathy. He was one of the most popular painters of domestic genre in the middle of the 19th century.

Around 1847, Frère settled his family in the village of Écouen, about eight miles north and a short train ride from Paris. The Frère atelier became the nucleus of a group of students and resident artists that would become known as the École d'Écouen. In 1885, Harper's published an illustrated article on the Écouen artists' colony. A number of Americans including Henry Bacon spent time in Écouen, and Mary Cassatt made several visits.

He was the father of the painter Charles Edouard Frère, and the brother of the orientalist painter Charles-Théodore Frère. He ran a school in Ecouen that was the subject of an article by Cornelia W. Conant for Harper's Magazine in 1885.
