= Clarence Township, Michigan =

- Township
- Location within the state of Michigan
- Coordinates: 42°22′25″N 84°46′30″W
- Country: United States
- State: Michigan
- County: Calhoun

Area
  - Total: 34.1 sq mi (88.2 km^{2})
  - Land: 32.5 sq mi (84.3 km^{2})
  - Water: 1.5 sq mi (3.9 km^{2})
- Elevation: 968 ft (295 m)

Population (2020)
  - Total: 1,903
  - Density: 58.5/sq mi (22.6/km^{2})
- Time zone: UTC-5 (Eastern (EST))
  - Summer (DST): UTC-4 (EDT)
- ZIP codes: 49076 (Olivet), 49224 (Albion), 49284 (Springport)
- FIPS code: 26-15960
- GNIS feature ID: 1626086
- Website: www.clarencetwp.org

Clarence Township is a civil township located in northeast Calhoun County in the U.S. state of Michigan. It is part of the Battle Creek, Michigan Metropolitan Statistical Area. The population was 1,903 at the 2020 census. The township was originally named Pinkney Township.

== History ==
Like the rest of Calhoun County, Clarence Township was populated by Potawatomi people before the coming of Euro-Americans. The first Euro-American settler came to the township in 1836. It was not until 1845 that a Euro-American settled at Duck Lake. This was Jacob Nichols, who still had Potawatomi neighbors as his only close neighbors for several years after this.

The township was organized in 1838. The first school in the township was established the following year.

== Communities ==
There are no incorporated municipalities within the rural township. There are settlements at a few unincorporated communities:

- Albion Landing, on the southeast shore of Duck Lake at 42°22′55″N 84°47′03″W.
- Charlotte Landing, on the east shore of Duck Lake at 42°23′32″N 84°46′33″W.
- Clarence Center, about one mile (1.6 km) east of Duck Lake at 42°22′52″N 84°46′05″W.
- Duck Lake, on the north side of Duck Lake at 42°24′00″N 84°46′56″W. All the historical settlements around Duck Lake are often commonly referred to as Duck Lake.
- Rice Creek, about six miles (10 km) southwest of Duck Lake at 42°20′04″N 84°49′43″W. This place is actually a few miles away from either branch of the Rice Creek, a tributary of the Kalamazoo River. It is situated at a crossroads separating Clarence Township on the northeast, Sheridan Township on the southeast, Marengo Township on the southwest, and Lee Township on the northwest.
- The city of Albion is to the south, and the 49224 ZIP code for the Albion post office serves much of the southern area of Clarence Township.
- The village of Olivet is to the northwest in Walton Township, Eaton County. The 49076 ZIP code for the Olivet post office also serves the northwest corner of Clarence Township.
- The village of Springport is to the east in Springport Township, Jackson County. The 49284 ZIP code for the Springport post office also serves much of the eastern area of Clarence Township.

== Geography ==
Duck Lake is the most prominent feature in the township, and is the headwaters for the Battle Creek River, which flows north from the lake towards Charlotte. Two other branches of Battle Creek also flow north out of the township. South and east of Duck Lake are a series of smaller lakes that flow into the North Branch of Rice Creek (a tributary of the Kalamazoo River). A small area west of Duck Lake drains into Indian Creek, which flows into Battle Creek near Olivet.

According to the United States Census Bureau, Clarence Township has a total area of 34.1 square miles (88.2 km^{2}), of which 32.5 square miles (84.3 km^{2}) is land and 1.5 square miles (3.9 km^{2}), or 4.40%, is water.

== Demographics ==
Historical population
Census	Pop.	Note	%±
1960	1,211		—
1970	1,392		14.9%
1980	1,916		37.6%
1990	2,051		7.0%
2000	2,032		−0.9%
2010	1,985		−2.3%
2020	1,903		−4.1%
Source: Census Bureau. Census 1960- 2000, 2010.

As of the census of 2000, there were 2,032 people, 796 households, and 599 families residing in the township. The population density was 62.1 inhabitants per square mile (24.0/km^{2}). There were 996 housing units at an average density of 30.4 per square mile (11.7/km^{2}). The racial makeup of the township was 97.29% White, 0.54% African American, 0.69% Native American, 0.10% Asian, 0.20% from other races, and 1.18% from two or more races. Hispanic or Latino of any race were 0.54% of the population.

There were 796 households, out of which 29.4% had children under the age of 18 living with them, 64.3% were married couples living together, 5.7% had a female householder with no husband present, and 24.7% were non-families. 20.5% of all households were made up of individuals, and 7.3% had someone living alone who was 65 years of age or older. The average household size was 2.55 and the average family size was 2.90.

In the township the population was spread out, with 24.1% under the age of 18, 6.6% from 18 to 24, 25.9% from 25 to 44, 29.9% from 45 to 64, and 13.4% who were 65 years of age or older. The median age was 40 years. For every 100 females, there were 106.9 males. For every 100 females age 18 and over, there were 108.1 males.

The median income for a household in the township was $40,700, and the median income for a family was $45,122. Males had a median income of $35,821 versus $21,544 for females. The per capita income for the township was $18,713. About 11.9% of families and 14.9% of the population were below the poverty line, including 23.3% of those under age 18 and none of those age 65 or over.
