= Granville Female College =

Women's college in Granville, Ohio (1827–1898)

- Type: Women's college
- Active: 1827–1898
- Location: 314 Broadway E, Granville, Ohio; 40°04′05″N 82°30′58″W

The Granville Female College was an American women's college located in Granville, Ohio. It was established as the Granville Academy in 1827, changed its name in 1867, and closed in 1898.

== History ==
The college was founded in 1827 under the name Granville Academy. It was "founded and is held in trust by those who are connected by membership or doctrinal sympathy with the Presbyterian Church, and from the beginning its object has been to afford young women a generous and thorough culture founded upon Christian principles."

The academy moved to a new and more permanent location in 1838. In 1867, the name of the institution was changed from Granville Academy to Granville Female College, and the course of study was enlarged.

In 1896, the college's catalog stated that it was then "the oldest school for the education of young women in the State". The college closed two years later.

In 1923, John Sutphin Jones, a coal and railroad magnate, commissioned the construction of the Granville Inn in the Jacobethan Revival style on the former site of Granville Female College; it is now a local landmark.

== Education ==
In Granville Female College's Primary and Academic Departments, any woman could attend and take classes, even if she did not plan on graduating. The Primary Department focused on young children's education, teaching reading and arithmetic. The Academic Department, or the Academy, also focused on younger students. Here, pupils would learn the proper line of study and understand practical applications of knowledge. The College was the only department that required examination before admission. Here, women would learn English, Mathematics, Geography, History and Science, among other subjects. Students could join clubs, participate in vocal and instrumental music training. Students could also take classes in Penciling, Crayoning, Landscape and Portrait-Painting, and Wax-Work. The students' art pieces would be exhibited around the school.

== Abolitionists in Granville ==
Theodore Dwight Weld was one of the first abolitionists in Granville, and he presented his lectures at Granville Female College in 1834. At the time, his ideas were especially radical, and his words were met with opposition. He was egged as he gave his lecture, and his ideas would bring the American Colonization Society to Granville to discuss abolition.

== The Granville Riot ==
The Granville Riot in 1834 was the culmination of tension between abolitionists and the American Colonization Society in Granville. Female students of the college that associated with the American Colonization Society were being escorted to their boarding house by men and were met by a drunken mob made up of abolitionists. The women ran to their boarding house, but there was violent fighting between the men. While no lives were taken, many were greatly injured in this riot.

== Trials at Granville Female College ==
The trials that decided whether a runaway slave could be taken from Ohio, a northern state, back to the South were held at Granville Female College. Here, Judge Samuel Bancroft decided that Ohio's extradition laws were unconstitutional.

== Notable alumnae ==
- Mary Hartwell Catherwood (1868)
- Lorinda Munson Bryant (1892)
