= Bernard Trevisan =

Fictional Italian alchemist

Bernard Trevisan [ˈtreːvizan] (Bernard of Treviso, Bernardus Trevisanus) was a fictional Italian alchemist who lived from 1406 to 1490. His biography has been composed by editors and commentators of alchemical texts from the 16th century. It is said that he was born into a noble family in Padua and spent his entire life spending his family fortune in search of the Philosopher's stone. The mythical character emerged by a confusion with the alchemist called Bernard of Trier. A recent study founded a chronicle of his death in 1387. He has been identified with Eberhard I von der Mark (1305-1387), a law graduate and clergyman, who became chorbishop of Cologne.

“[anno 1387] ...eodem anno decessit in Alemannia, in Civitate Treveris, Magnus Bernardus, qui in dicta Civitate magnam vitam tenebit, et tenebat circa famulos XX, et equos VIII, et facievat magna convivia, et omni die forentes comedebant cum eo, et faciebat magnas elemosynas, et quotidie dabat comedere pluribus pauperibus, aliquando usque in centum, et aliquando usque ducentum. Et erat mirabilier fucitus in domo sua arnisiorum, et habeat in dicta domo sua unam Capellam cum altare mirabiliter ornatam, et paratam cum multis Reliquiis mirabiliter ornatis. Et dicitus et creditus, quod dicta Capella cum dicto altare valebat magnam summam Florenorum. Et continue habeat scriptores et scribebat optime, et quibus dictabat. Tamen nondum potuit sciri quid faceret scibere, nec scitur unde haberet pecuniam unde posset facere tot et tantas expensas, tamen suspicitur et creditur quod haceret Archimiam. Finaliter dictum fuit quod fuerat filius Regis Norvegiae”.

He resigned his positions in the Church to marry in 1346 with Maria de Looz-Agimont (ca.1336-1410), whose titles and territories counties were key points in feudal disputes involving Von der Marck family. From 1366 he was closely related to Kuno II von Falkenstein (ca.1320-1388), archbishop of Trier.

José Rodríguez found alternative information in the correspondence of the kings of Aragon, Peter IV and his son John I, who were great enthusiasts and patrons of alchemy. Both were interested in the activities of the alchemist Bernardus Magnus of Trier. We have a letter sent in 1385 to King Charles II of Navarre (1349-1387), in which Pedro requests a copy of certain information from the Bishop of Strasbourg, Frederick of Blankenheim:

“Sigilli secreti: Rey hermano muy caro: Entendido havemos que recibiestes una letra del vispe d’Argentina, por la qual vos faze saber cómo en la Ciutat de Traves yes venido un hombre apellado Maestre Bernat, el qual en semble con xxxvj. companyeros o [Unreadable] suyos son tan savios que a toda question que les sea fecha dan siempre laguia alguno buena solución. E otras cosas que fazen las quales por lur estranyeza e grandeza quei son vistas passan humanal poder e saber. E como Rey hermano muy caro por la maravella delas ditas cosas cobdiciemos seyer aplen certificados daquellas, rogamos vos carament que al mas antes que podredes nos enbiedes copia dela dita letra trametida a vos por el desusdito vispe. E faredes nos desto plazer el qual vos agradeceremos muyto. E si algunas cosas podemos por honra vuestra fazer Rey hermano, enbiat nos lo dezir e compliremos lo de grado E sea la santa trinidat vuestra guarda. Dada a figueras, dins nuestro sellyo secreto, a . xxvij. dias de agosto del anyo McccLxxxv. Lo Rey. El rey d’Aragó vuestro hermano”.

Bernardo was in contact with the Archbishop of Trier, Kuno II von Falkenstein, and moved to live in Stolzenfels Castle, owned by the archbishopric and located on the banks of the Rhine, a few kilometres from the county of Aremberg, of which he was the titular lord. According to the chronicle of his death, in this luxurious place he had a scriptorium and gathered alchemists from all over Europe. Peter IV's letter confirms this information that Bernardo lived in the Electorate of Trier with 26 other alchemists. News about Bernardo reached the Aragonese court through the court travelling with King Peter's new wife, Violante de Bar (1365-1431). The Duchy of Bar was a state of the Holy Roman Empire bordering the territories and bishoprics controlled by the Grafschaft Mark. The Aragonese court suddenly saw an influx of German silversmiths and goldsmiths from the same north-western area of the Holy Roman Empire, such as Colí de Namur, Teodoric de la Vort, Consolí Blanc and Hans Tramer. Many also worked for Charles II of Navarre. We also have people with other court positions concentrated in the same period, such as Daniel de Bruyn, Johan de Constança, Huynquí d'Estrasburg and Renaquí d'Alamanya. In 1387, the new king John sent his father-in-law Robert, Duke of Bar, another request for information:

“…entés que en Alamanya ha vengut dies ha un hom quis apella Maestre Bernart, qui té fort gran stat e fa moltes e grans maravelles e fa sa aturada en la Ciutat de Trebes, o de Mayenca, pregantuos car pare quens en scrivats lo fet de la veritat largament si es ver o no e que es dell ne de sos afers con en moltes e diverses maneres se compte”.

== Biography ==
The fictional Bernard Trevisan began his career as an alchemist at the age of fourteen. He had his family's permission, as they also desired to increase their wealth. He first worked with a monk of Cîteaux named Gotfridus Leurier. They attempted for eight years to fashion the Philosopher's stone out of hen eggshells and egg yolk purified in horse manure.

He then worked with minerals and natural salts using distillation and crystallization methods borrowed from Jabir ibn Hayyan and Muhammad ibn Zakariya al-Razi. When these failed he turned to vegetable and animal material, finally using human blood and urine. He gradually sold his wealth to buy secrets and hints towards the stone, most often from swindlers. He traveled all over the known world, including the Baltics, Germany, Spain, France, Vienna, Egypt, Palestine, Persia, Greece, Turkey, and Cyprus, to find hints left by past alchemists. His health had been deteriorating, most likely from the fumes he had created with his alchemy. He retired to the Island of Rhodes, still working on the Philosopher's stone until his death in 1490.

== Attributed works ==
In the sixteenth century, several alchemical works were attributed to Bernard. For example, Trevisanus de Chymico miraculo, quod lapidem philosophiae appellant was edited in 1583 by Gerhard Dorn. The Answer of Bernardus Trevisanus, to the Epistle of Thomas of Bononia, and The Prefatory Epistle of Bernard Earl of Tresne, in English, appeared in the 1680 Aurifontina Chymica.
