= Laurinda Jaffe =

American biologist

Laurinda Ann Jaffe
- Born: January 9, 1952 (age 74); Pasadena, California
- Education: University of California, Los Angeles; University of Wisconsin–Madison; Purdue University
- Scientific career
- Workplaces: University of Connecticut; Woods Hole Oceanographic Institution; University of California, San Diego
- Thesis: The fast block to polyspermy in sea urchin egg is electrically mediated (1977)

Laurinda A. Jaffe (born January 9, 1952) is an American biologist who is a professor and chair at the University of Connecticut. Her research considers the physiological mechanisms that regulate oocyte cell and fertilization. She was elected to the National Academy of Sciences in 2021.

== Early life and education ==
Jaffe was born in Pasadena, California. Her father, Lionel F. Jaffe, was a senior scientist at the Marine Biological Laboratory in the Woods Hole Oceanographic Institution. Her mother, Miriam (Walther) Jaffe, was a professor of astronomy at Purdue University. Jaffe was an undergraduate student at the University of Wisconsin–Madison. After two years, she moved to Purdue University, where she majored in biology. She was a graduate researcher at the University of California, Los Angeles, where she worked under the supervision of Susumu Hagiwara. Her doctoral research considered polyspermy in sea urchin eggs. After graduating, Jaffe worked as a postdoctoral researcher at Woods Hole Oceanographic Institution with Lewis Tilney and at the University of California, San Diego with Meredith Gould.

== Research and career ==
Jaffe studies the physiological mechanisms that regulate oocyte cell and fertilisation. In particular, she is interested in the meiosis process that takes place in mammalian ovarian follicles. Meiosis is a type of cell division that prepares the oocyte for fertilisation. The process begins during embryonic development, and then arrests for a prolonged period of time in a prophase. The follicle (including the oocyte and granulosa cells) regulates meiotic progression in the oocyte. She identified the proteins (G_{s} protein) and receptors (GPR3) that are responsible for meiotic prophase arrests. The activity of these proteins result in the production of cyclic adenosine monophosphate (cAMP), which keeps the cell cycles arrested. Meanwhile, the granulosa cells within the follicle regulate the hydrolysis of cAMP, a process which involves cyclic guanosine monophosphate (cGMP) as a phosphodiesterase inhibitor that maintains high cAMP and meiotic arrest. The signalling system within the granulosa cell switches in response to the luteinizing hormone, which Jaffe has shown lowers the cGMP. This decrease in cGMP can be monitored using confocal microscopy of mice follicles that express the Fluorescence Resonance Energy Transfer (FRET) sensor cGi500.

Jaffe has studied the processes that give rise to the fibroblast growth factor (FGF)-induced inhibition of bone growth. Hormonal signalling decreases the amount of cGMP by inactivating NPR2. In the ovaries, this causes the cGMP to resume meiotic function, whilst it diminishes growth within bones.

== Awards and honors ==
- 2007 Elected Fellow of the American Association for the Advancement of Science
- 2019 National Institutes of Health MERIT award
- 2021 Elected to the National Academy of Sciences

== Selected publications ==
- LAURINDA A. JAFFE (1 May 1976). "Fast block to polyspermy in sea urchin eggs is electrically mediated". Nature. 261 (5555): 68–71. Bibcode:1976Natur.261...68J. doi:10.1038/261068a0. ISSN 1476-4687. PMID 944858. Wikidata Q59060070.
- Rachael P Norris; William J Ratzan; Marina Freudzon; et al. (June 2009). "Cyclic GMP from the surrounding somatic cells regulates cyclic AMP and meiosis in the mouse oocyte". Development. 136 (11): 1869–78. doi:10.1242/dev.035238. ISSN 0950-1991. PMC 2680110. PMID 19429786. Wikidata Q24647243.
- Linda L Runft; Laurinda A Jaffe; Lisa M Mehlmann (1 May 2002). "Egg activation at fertilization: where it all begins". Developmental Biology. 245 (2): 237–254. doi:10.1006/dbio.2002.0600. ISSN 0012-1606. PMID 11977978. Wikidata Q34615390.
