= Luray, Indiana =

- Unincorporated community
- Location within Indiana Location within the United States
- Coordinates: 40°04′16″N 85°22′01″W
- Country: United States
- State: Indiana
- County: Henry
- Township: Prairie
- Named for: Luray, Virginia, US
- Elevation: 997 ft (304 m)
- ZIP code: 47386
- FIPS code: 18-45306
- GNIS feature ID: 438410

Luray is an unincorporated community in Prairie Township, Henry County, Indiana, United States.

== History ==
Luray was laid out and platted in 1836. The community was named after Luray, Virginia since a large share of the early settlers were natives of that state. A post office was established at Luray in 1838, and remained in operation until it was discontinued in 1901.
