= Luray, Tennessee =

- Unincorporated community
- Location within Tennessee Location within the United States
- Coordinates: 35°35′29″N 88°34′33″W
- Country: United States
- State: Tennessee
- County: Henderson

Area
  - Total: 3.27 sq mi (8.47 km^{2})
  - Land: 3.27 sq mi (8.47 km^{2})
  - Water: 0 sq mi (0.00 km^{2})
- Elevation: 407 ft (124 m)

Population (2020)
  - Total: 197
  - Density: 60.2/sq mi (23.25/km^{2})
- Time zone: UTC-6 (Central (CST))
  - Summer (DST): UTC-5 (CDT)
- ZIP code: 38352
- Area code: 731
- GNIS feature ID: 1292294

Luray is an unincorporated community in Henderson County, Tennessee, United States. The zipcode is: 38352.

== Demographics ==
Historical population
Census	Pop.	Note	%±
2020	197		—
U.S. Decennial Census
