= Charles Edouard Frère =

French painter (1837–1894)

Charles-Édouard Frère
- Born: July 10, 1837; Paris
- Died: November 2, 1894 (aged 57); Écouen
- Education: atelier of Thomas Couture
- Father: Pierre Édouard Frère

Signature
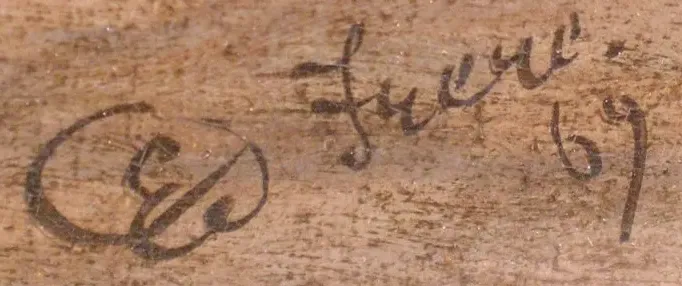

Charles-Édouard Frère (July 10, 1837 – November 2, 1894) was a French painter of rural landscapes and daily life, known especially for paintings of horses and blacksmithing.

== Upbringing in Écouen ==
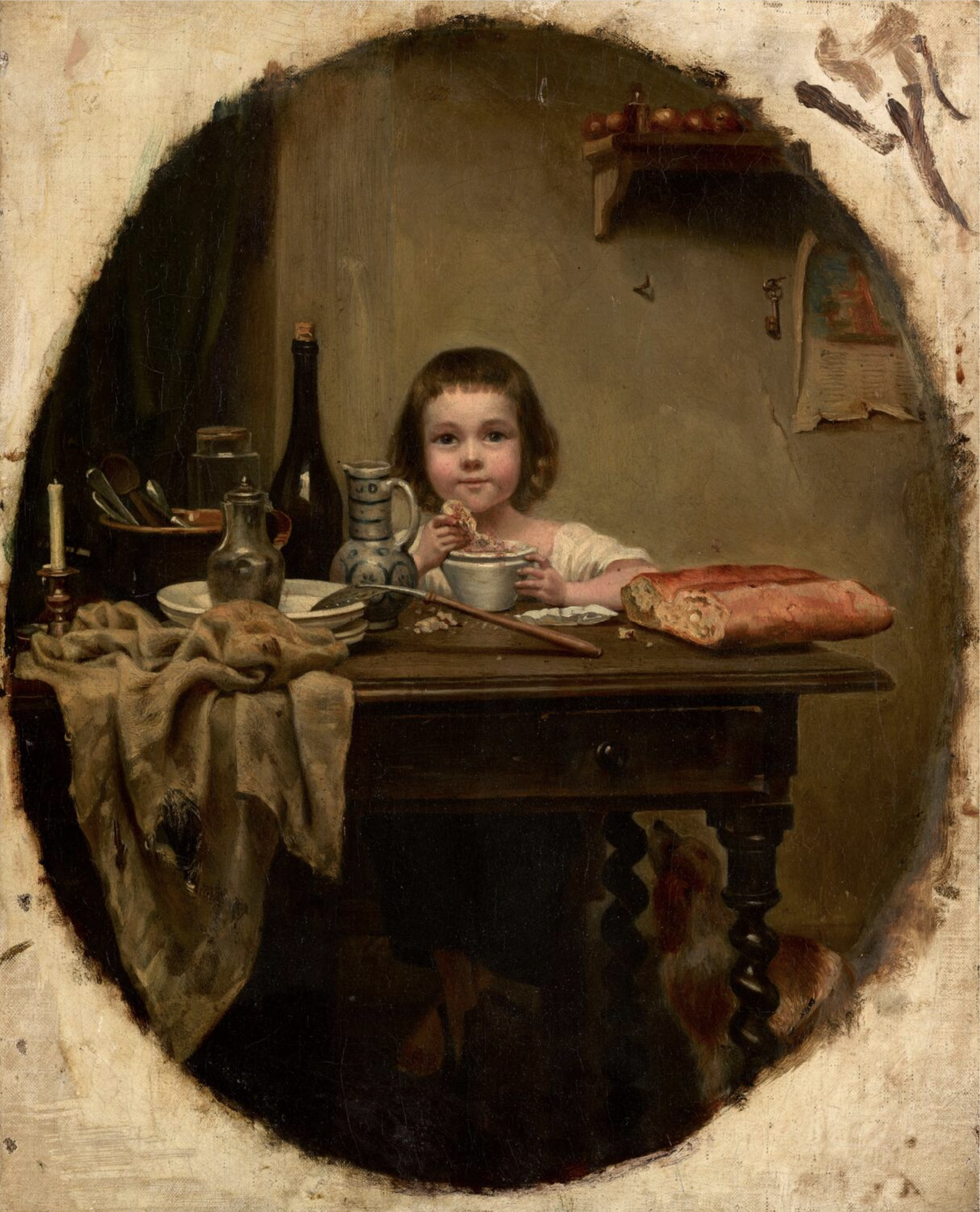
Charles-Édouard Frère was the subject of his father's painting Le Petit Gourmand, exhibited at the Paris Salon of 1843, now at the Château de Compiègne.

Frère was born in Paris. He was the son of the genre painter Pierre Édouard Frère (1819-1886), and is sometimes called Frère fils, and was the nephew of the Orientalist painter Théodore Frère (1814-1888).

Around 1847, the elder Frère settled the family in the village of Écouen, about eight miles north and a short train ride from Paris. The Frère atelier became the nucleus of a group of students and resident artists that would become known as the École d'Écouen.

A number of Americans including Henry Bacon spent time in Écouen, and Mary Cassatt made several visits.

From infancy, Frère fils played a role in his father's career. A visitor to Écouen wrote, "In his house Frère has an exquisite collection of pictures…[including] the one by his own brush which first brought him fame. It is a picture of his own son when a mere baby, who, perched up in his table-chair, is dividing his time between munching his roll of bread-and-butter, and deranging the articles that are scattered about the table. It is a composition as simple and graceful and sweet as childhood itself."

== Career ==
In 1885, Harper's published an illustrated article on the Écouen artists' colony, which noted that the elder Frère's "only son is also an artist. He is married, and lives in a pretty, artistic fashion quite near his parents. He was a pupil of his father and of the famous [Thomas] Couture."

The younger Frère's painting continued the style and subject matter of his father; Le Matin called him "le peintre de la vie rustique." He was awarded medals at the Paris Salon of 1882, 1883, and 1885.

Because of similarities in their work and their names, and the overlapping years of their careers, the paintings of father and son are sometimes confused. They may be distinguished by the signatures: "Ed. Frère" or "Edouard Frère" for the father, while the son's work is signed beginning with the letter "C", sometimes as part of a stylized monogram combining the letters "C" and "E".

== Personal life; death ==
On January 20, 1874, he married Giulia Augustina Maria Robecchi (b. 1855), the daughter of the theatrical designer and painter Henry Robecchi (1826-1888) of Paris. They had a son, Gabriel (1874-1922), who became an actor, and two daughters who died very young. In 1879 he was elected to the Écouen city council, taking a seat vacated by his father.

In November, 1894, returning to his home in Écouen from painting at a rural site, he fell from a horse-cart running at full speed and died at the age of 57. His remains joined those of his father and father-in-law at the Cimetière d'Écouen. His death effectively marked the end of the Ecole d'Écouen.

== Gallery ==
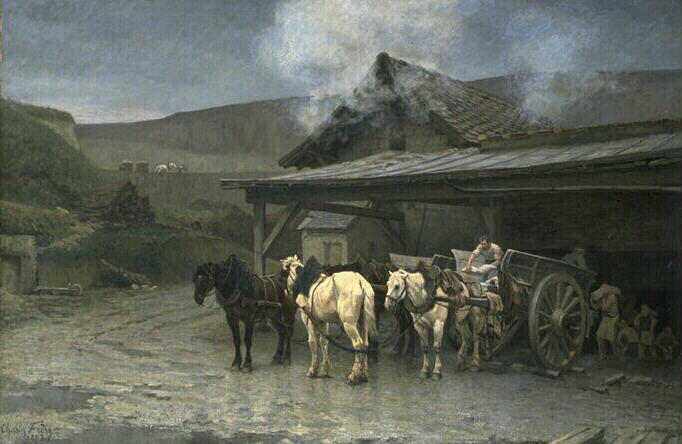
La plâtrière à Saint-Brice, 1883, Musée des Beaux-Arts de Bordeaux

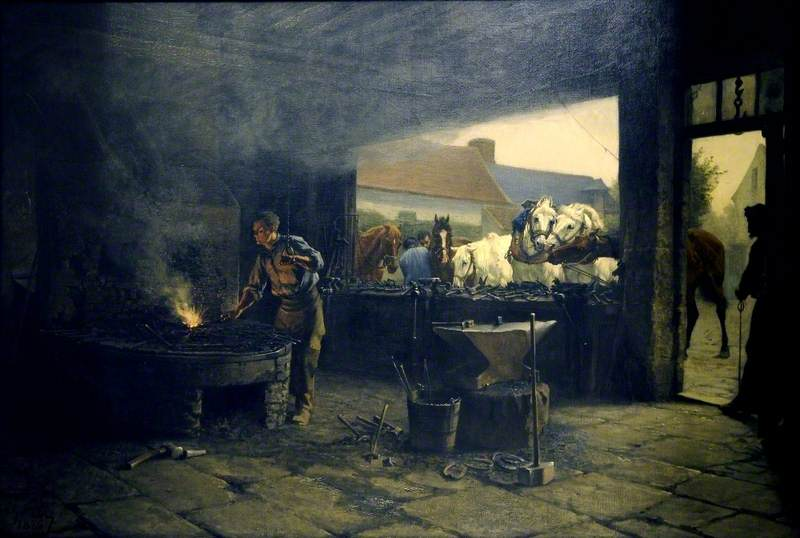
Shoeing Forge, 1886, Sheffield Galleries and Museums Trust
