= Lorinda Munson Bryant =

American writer and educator

Lorinda Munson Bryant (21 March 1855 − 13 December 1933) was an American pharmacist, educator, and writer.

== Biography ==
She was born near Granville, Ohio, in 1855 to Marvin M. Munson, a lawyer, and Emma Sabin Culbertson. In 1875, she married Charles W. Bryant, a druggist; he died in 1886, and Lorinda Bryant took over running his drug store. She graduated from the Granville Female College in 1875 and received an honorary bachelors of science in 1890. She became among the first women in Ohio to be a registered pharmacist in 1887. She subsequently studied science at Cornell University, and later founded the Montrose School for girls in South Orange, New Jersey. The school closed in 1905, and Bryant turned to writing, eventually publishing over twenty books. A History of Painting, published in 1906, was among her most successful books.

Her other works include What Pictures to See in America (1915), Famous Pictures of Real Animals (1918), Bible Stories in Bible Language (1922), The Children's Book of Celebrated Bridges, The Children's Book of Celebrated Towers, and The Children's Book of European Landmarks,

She was a member of the American Geographical Society and of the National Board of Review of Motion Pictures.
