= Springport, Michigan =

- Village
- Village of Springport
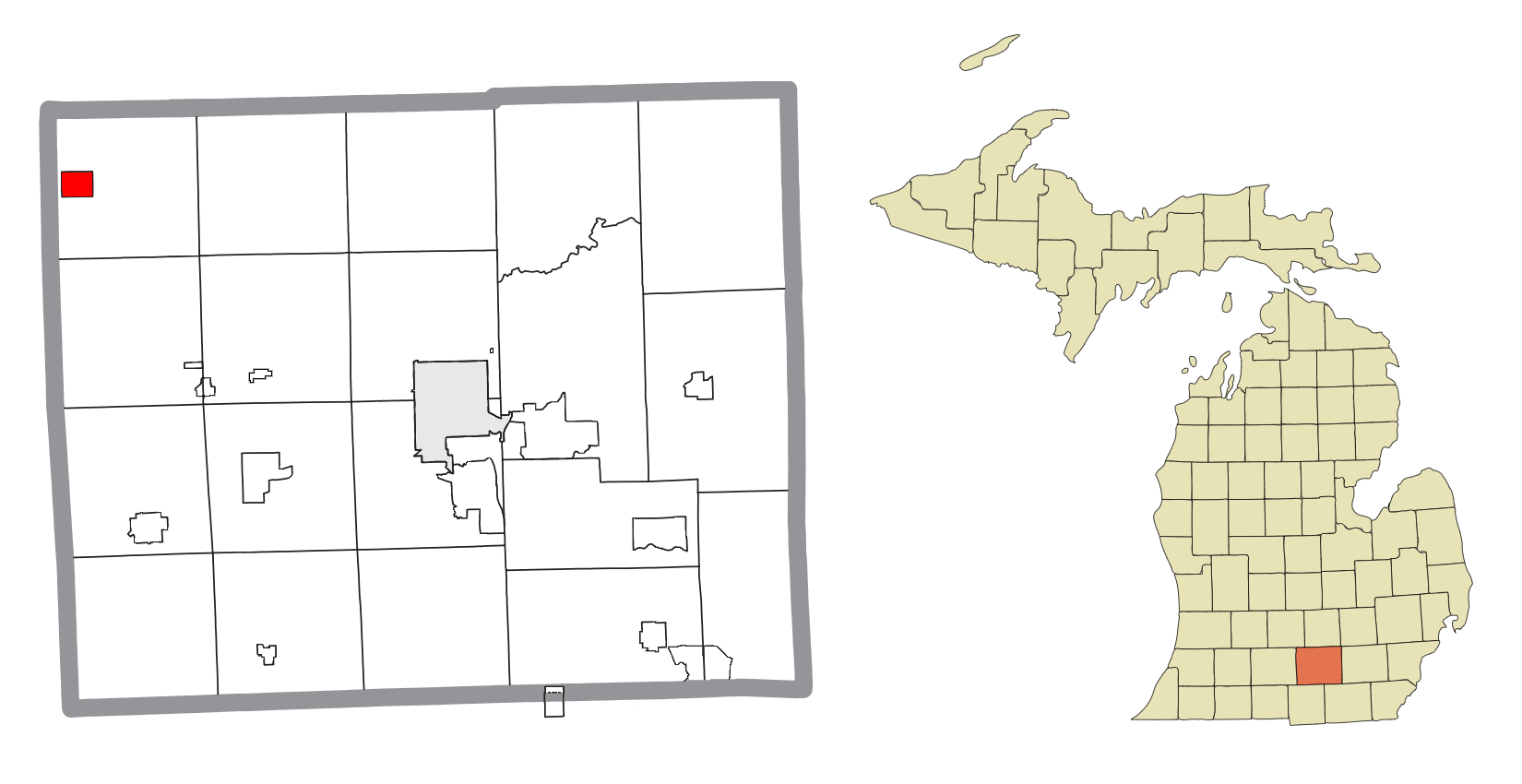
- Location within Jackson County

- Location within the state of Michigan
- Coordinates: 42°22′43″N 84°41′41″W
- Country: United States
- State: Michigan
- County: Jackson
- Township: Springport
- Settled: 1836
- Incorporated: 1882

Government
  - Type: Village council
  - President: Gordon Webb
  - Clerk: Sommer Engelter

Area
  - Total: 1.26 sq mi (3.26 km^{2})
  - Land: 1.26 sq mi (3.26 km^{2})
  - Water: 0 sq mi (0.00 km^{2})
- Elevation: 1,001 ft (305 m)

Population (2020)
  - Total: 776
  - Density: 616.1/sq mi (237.86/km^{2})
- Time zone: UTC-5 (Eastern (EST))
  - Summer (DST): UTC-4 (EDT)
- ZIP code(s): 49284
- Area code: 517
- FIPS code: 26-75860
- GNIS feature ID: 0638630
- Website: Official website

Springport is a village in Jackson County of the U.S. state of Michigan. As of the 2020 census, Springport had a population of 776. The village is located within Springport Township on M-99 about 20 miles (32.2 km) northwest of Jackson. Springport High School is located in the village.

== Geography ==
According to the United States Census Bureau, the village has a total area of 1.26 square miles (3.26 km^{2}), all land.

== History ==
Springport was originally developed by a man named John Oyer, who arrived in late 1836 from Cayuga County, New York. Oyer helped organize the township's government. He built the first store in Springport, and erected several brick stores, as well as a hotel and a mill. For many years the community was known as "Oyer’s Corner" before the name was changed to Springport. Springport was the name of a town in Cayuga County, New York. The village was incorporated in 1882, with a population of roughly 600 people.

== Demographics ==
Historical population
Census	Pop.	Note	%±
1880	385		—
1890	407		5.7%
1900	559		37.3%
1910	584		4.5%
1920	535		−8.4%
1930	562		5.0%
1940	502		−10.7%
1950	598		19.1%
1960	693		15.9%
1970	723		4.3%
1980	675		−6.6%
1990	707		4.7%
2000	704		−0.4%
2010	800		13.6%
2020	776		−3.0%
U.S. Decennial Census

=== 2010 census ===
As of the census of 2010, there were 800 people, 293 households, and 207 families living in the village. The population density was 634.9 inhabitants per square mile (245.1/km^{2}). There were 312 housing units at an average density of 247.6 per square mile (95.6/km^{2}). The racial makeup of the village was 96.1% White, 0.1% African American, 0.5% Native American, 0.4% Asian, 0.6% from other races, and 2.3% from two or more races. Hispanic or Latino of any race were 1.9% of the population.

There were 293 households, of which 39.9% had children under the age of 18 living with them, 43.3% were married couples living together, 20.8% had a female householder with no husband present, 6.5% had a male householder with no wife present, and 29.4% were non-families. 24.6% of all households were made up of individuals, and 9.2% had someone living alone who was 65 years of age or older. The average household size was 2.73 and the average family size was 3.10.

The median age in the village was 33.6 years. 29% of residents were under the age of 18; 11.5% were between the ages of 18 and 24; 23.8% were from 25 to 44; 25.4% were from 45 to 64; and 10.4% were 65 years of age or older. The gender makeup of the village was 47.3% male and 52.8% female.

=== 2000 census ===
As of the census of 2000, there were 704 people, 266 households, and 193 families living in the village. The population density was 551.7 inhabitants per square mile (213.0/km^{2}). There were 281 housing units at an average density of 220.2 per square mile (85.0/km^{2}). The racial makeup of the village was 96.73% White, 0.14% African American, 0.43% Native American, 0.28% Asian, 0.14% Pacific Islander, 0.99% from other races, and 1.28% from two or more races. Hispanic or Latino of any race were 1.85% of the population.

There were 266 households, out of which 37.2% had children under the age of 18 living with them, 49.2% were married couples living together, 15.4% had a female householder with no husband present, and 27.4% were non-families. 22.9% of all households were made up of individuals, and 9.8% had someone living alone who was 65 years of age or older. The average household size was 2.65 and the average family size was 3.03.

In the village, the population was spread out, with 28.7% under the age of 18, 10.2% from 18 to 24, 29.1% from 25 to 44, 21.4% from 45 to 64, and 10.5% who were 65 years of age or older. The median age was 35 years. For every 100 females, there were 91.3 males. For every 100 females age 18 and over, there were 88.0 males.

The median income for a household in the village was $40,052, and the median income for a family was $43,068. Males had a median income of $31,500 versus $20,893 for females. The per capita income for the village was $13,887. About 7.1% of families and 8.9% of the population were below the poverty line, including 5.2% of those under age 18 and 8.8% of those age 65 or over.

== Transportation ==
=== Major highways ===
- M-99

== Attractions ==
Springport Motor Speedway is a racing facility constructed in 1989 and is home to short track racing. It has a Bandeloro class for up and coming racers.
