= Springport Township, Michigan =

- Civil township
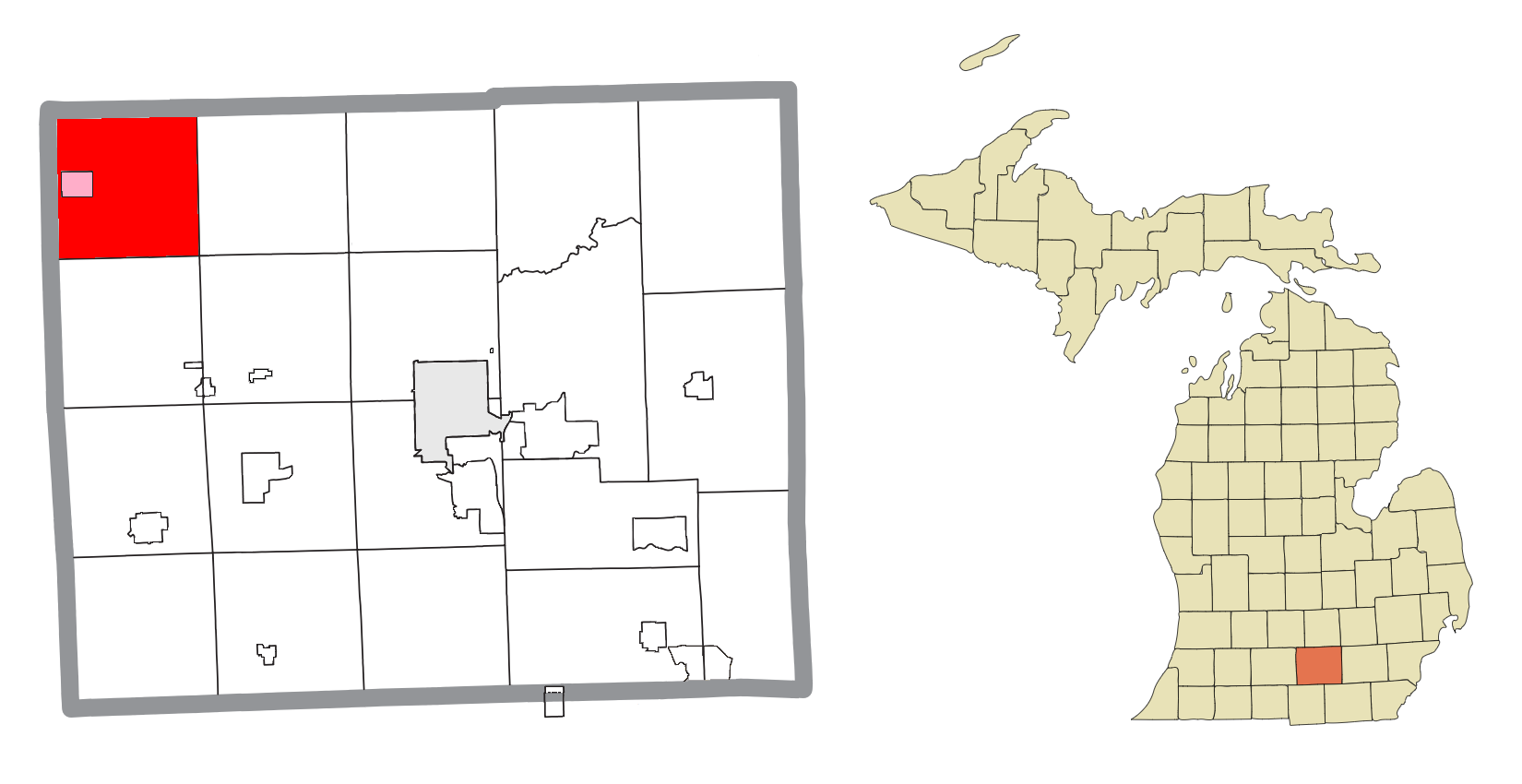
- Location within Jackson County (red) and the administered village of Springport (pink)

- Location within the state of Michigan Springport Township (the United States)
- Coordinates: 42°22′44″N 84°40′16″W
- Country: United States
- State: Michigan
- County: Jackson

Government
  - Supervisor: Karl Schmidt
  - Clerk: Jackie Riehle

Area
  - Total: 36.37 sq mi (94.2 km^{2})
  - Land: 36.10 sq mi (93.5 km^{2})
  - Water: 0.27 sq mi (0.70 km^{2})
- Elevation: 948 ft (289 m)

Population (2020)
  - Total: 2,142
  - Density: 59.34/sq mi (22.91/km^{2})
- Time zone: UTC-5 (Eastern (EST))
  - Summer (DST): UTC-4 (EDT)
- ZIP code(s): 48827 (Eaton Rapids); 49269 (Parma); 49284 (Springport)
- Area code: 517
- FIPS code: 26-75880
- GNIS feature ID: 1627112
- Website: Official website

Springport Township is a civil township of Jackson County in the U.S. state of Michigan. As of the 2020 census, the township population was 2,142.

== Communities ==
- East Springport was the name of a post office in this township from 1874 until 1900.
- Springport is a village within the township.

== Geography ==
According to the United States Census Bureau, the township has a total area of 36.37 square miles (94.20 km^{2}), of which 36.10 square miles (93.50 km^{2}) is land and 0.17 square miles (0.44 km^{2}) (0.47%) is water.

Springport Township is in the northwest corner of Jackson County, bordered to the north by Eaton County and to the west by Calhoun County. It is 20 miles (32 km) northwest of the city of Jackson, the county seat.

== Demographics ==
As of the census of 2000, there were 2,182 people, 770 households, and 586 families in the township. The population density was 60.4 inhabitants per square mile (23.3/km^{2}). There were 816 housing units at an average density of 22.6 per square mile (8.7/km^{2}). The racial makeup of the township was 97.71% White, 0.27% African American, 0.50% Native American, 0.09% Asian, 0.05% Pacific Islander, 0.41% from other races, and 0.96% from two or more races. Hispanic or Latino of any race were 1.15% of the population.

There were 770 households, out of which 37.7% had children under the age of 18 living with them, 59.9% were married couples living together, 8.7% had a female householder with no husband present, and 23.8% were non-families. 18.3% of all households were made up of individuals, and 6.9% had someone living alone who was 65 years of age or older. The average household size was 2.83 and the average family size was 3.19.

In the township the population was spread out, with 29.0% under the age of 18, 8.6% from 18 to 24, 30.1% from 25 to 44, 22.2% from 45 to 64, and 10.2% who were 65 years of age or older. The median age was 35 years. For every 100 females, there were 106.2 males. For every 100 females age 18 and over, there were 101.8 males.

The median income for a household in the township was $42,344, and the median income for a family was $49,265. Males had a median income of $36,289 versus $24,464 for females. The per capita income for the township was $16,417. About 5.5% of families and 7.8% of the population were below the poverty line, including 8.4% of those under age 18 and 6.3% of those age 65 or over.
