= Luray, Ohio =

Unincorporated community in Ohio, U.S.

Coordinates: 39°57′28″N 82°31′54″W

Luray is an unincorporated community in Licking County, in the U.S. state of Ohio.

== History ==
Luray was laid out in 1832. A post office called Luray was established in 1835, and remained in operation until 1844.
