= National Register of Historic Places listings in Montgomery County, Indiana =

Location of Montgomery County in Indiana

This is a list of the National Register of Historic Places listings in Montgomery County, Indiana.

This is intended to be a complete list of the properties and districts on the National Register of Historic Places in Montgomery County, Indiana, United States. Latitude and longitude coordinates are provided for many National Register properties and districts; these locations may be seen together in a map.

There are 22 properties and districts listed on the National Register in the county, including two National Historic Landmarks.

Properties and districts located in incorporated areas display the name of the municipality, while properties and districts in unincorporated areas display the name of their civil township. Properties and districts split between multiple jurisdictions display the names of all jurisdictions.

This National Park Service list is complete through NPS recent listings posted January 30, 2026.

== Current listings ==
	Name on the Register	Image	Date listed	Location	City or town	Description
1	Ashby	Ashby	July 17, 1980 (#80000029)	Southwest of Ladoga on County Road 350E; 39°53′53″N 86°50′52″W	Scott Township	
2	Bethel AME Church of Crawfordsville	Bethel AME Church of Crawfordsville	September 16, 2001 (#01000990)	213 W. North St. 40°02′41″N 86°54′14″W	Crawfordsville	
3	Crawfordsville Commercial Historic District	Crawfordsville Commercial Historic District	March 25, 1992 (#92000183)	Roughly bounded by Walnut, North, and Water Sts., and Wabash Ave. 40°02′32″N 86°53′59″W	Crawfordsville	
4	Crawfordsville High School	Crawfordsville High School	June 22, 2003 (#03000543)	201 E. Jefferson St. 40°02′15″N 86°53′59″W	Crawfordsville	
5	Culver Union Hospital	Culver Union Hospital	April 25, 2001 (#01000402)	306 Binford St. 40°02′40″N 86°53′48″W	Crawfordsville	
6	Darlington Covered Bridge	Darlington Covered Bridge	November 28, 1990 (#90001782)	County Roads 500N and 500E over Sugar Creek, west of Darlington; 40°06′29″N 86°47′37″W	Franklin Township	
7	George and Sarah Durham House	George and Sarah Durham House	August 23, 2022 (#100008056)	215 West Main St. 40°02′30″N 86°54′14″W	Crawfordsville	The Durhams built this Renaissance Revival house in 1900. He was a banker and she the daughter of a wealthy farmer. Her will endowed the house as a "ladies' home," which has provided low-rent housing for women since 1944.
8	Elston Grove Historic District	Elston Grove Historic District	March 25, 1992 (#92000187)	Roughly bounded by Green, College, and Main Sts., and the former Monon railroad tracks 40°02′24″N 86°53′43″W	Crawfordsville	
9	Col. Isaac C. Elston House	Col. Isaac C. Elston House	April 15, 1982 (#82000025)	400 E. Pike St. 40°02′23″N 86°53′48″W	Crawfordsville	
10	William Fisher Polygonal Barn	William Fisher Polygonal Barn	April 2, 1993 (#93000188)	County Road 850N just east of its junction with County Road 800E, west of Bowers; 40°09′38″N 86°44′51″W	Sugar Creek Township	
11	Henry S. Lane House	Henry S. Lane House	November 23, 1981 (#81000003)	212 S. Water St. 40°02′24″N 86°53′50″W	Crawfordsville	
12	Linden Depot	Linden Depot	November 28, 1990 (#90001781)	202 N. James St. 40°11′35″N 86°54′17″W	Linden	
13	McClelland-Layne House	McClelland-Layne House	September 12, 1985 (#85002135)	602 Cherry St. 40°02′41″N 86°54′33″W	Crawfordsville	
14	Montgomery County Jail and Sheriff's Residence	Montgomery County Jail and Sheriff's Residence	May 1, 1975 (#75000007)	225 N. Washington St. 40°02′38″N 86°54′06″W	Crawfordsville	Designated a National Historic Landmark in 2023.
15	Normal Hall	Normal Hall	January 11, 1996 (#95001533)	Northwestern corner of the junction of W. Main and Harrison Sts. 39°54′50″N 86°48′15″W	Ladoga	
16	Abijah O'Neall II House	Abijah O'Neall II House	September 15, 2005 (#05001016)	4040 W. 300S, west of Crawfordsville; 40°01′26″N 86°59′04″W	Ripley Township	
17	Saint John's Episcopal Church	Saint John's Episcopal Church	March 21, 1985 (#85000598)	212 S. Green St. 40°02′25″N 86°53′58″W	Crawfordsville	
18	Otto Schlemmer Building	Otto Schlemmer Building	November 28, 1978 (#78000026)	129-131 N. Green St. 40°02′34″N 86°54′00″W	Crawfordsville	
19	George Seybold House	George Seybold House	October 16, 2002 (#02001172)	111 E. Main St. 39°52′37″N 87°02′40″W	Waveland	
20	T.C. Steele Boyhood Home	T.C. Steele Boyhood Home	December 24, 2003 (#03001318)	110 S. Cross St. 39°52′34″N 87°02′41″W	Waveland	
21	Gen. Lew Wallace Study	Gen. Lew Wallace Study	May 11, 1976 (#76000013)	Pike St. and Wallace Ave. 40°02′26″N 86°53′40″W	Crawfordsville	
22	Yount's Woolen Mill and Boarding House	Yount's Woolen Mill and Boarding House	January 4, 1989 (#88003041)	3729 Old State Road 32, west of Crawfordsville; 40°01′22″N 86°58′29″W	Ripley Township	

== See also ==
- List of National Historic Landmarks in Indiana
- National Register of Historic Places listings in Indiana
- Listings in neighboring counties: Boone, Clinton, Fountain, Hendricks, Parke, Putnam, Tippecanoe
- List of Indiana state historical markers in Montgomery County
