= List of Indiana state historical markers in Montgomery County =

Location of Montgomery County in Indiana

This is a list of the Indiana state historical markers in Montgomery County.

This is intended to be a complete list of the official state historical markers placed in Montgomery County, Indiana, United States by the Indiana Historical Bureau. The locations of the historical markers and their latitude and longitude coordinates are included below when available, along with their names, years of placement, and topics as recorded by the Historical Bureau. There are 10 historical markers located in Montgomery County.

== Historical markers ==
| Marker title | Image | Year placed | Location | Topics |
|---|---|---|---|---|
| Lane Place | | 1962 | 212 S. Water Street at Wabash Avenue in Crawfordsville; 40°2′24″N 86°53′51″W | Politics, Buildings and Architecture |
| Major General Lew Wallace 1827-1905 | | 1963 | 501 Pike Street at the Wallace Avenue junction in Crawfordsville; 40°2′26.6″N 86°53′43″W | Military, Arts and Culture |
| Chief Cornstalk's Village | | 1981 | Junction of U.S. Route 231 and County Road 1150S, adjacent to Parkersburg Spring near Parkersburg; 39°52′23″N 86°54′11″W | American Indian/Native American, Early Settlement and Exploration |
| Darlington Covered Bridge | | 1993 | County Roads 500N and 600E at the southwestern corner of this bridge over Sugar Creek, near Darlington; 40°6′27″N 86°47′37″W | Transportation, Buildings and Architecture |
| Speed Cabin | | 1995 | 310 N. Grant St. in Crawfordsville; 40°2′41.2″N 86°54′15″W | Underground Railroad; African American; Black History |
| Montgomery County Rotary Jail | | 2000 | Old Jail Museum at 225 N. Washington Street (U.S. Route 231) by the Spring Street junction in Crawfordsville; 40°2′38″N 86°54′6″W | Government Institutions, Buildings and Architecture |
| William Bratton, Lewis and Clark Expedition Member | | 2002 | Eastern side of the junction of U.S. Route 136 and State Road 25 at Old Pioneer Cemetery on the eastern edge of Waynetown; 40°5′16″N 87°3′33″W | Early Settlement and Exploration, Cemetery |
| Crawfordsville's Carnegie Library | | 2009 | Carnegie Museum of Montgomery County, 222 S. Washington Street (U.S. Route 231) in Crawfordsville; 40°02′23″N 86°54′4″W | Education & Libraries, Buildings & Architecture, Women |
| Henry S. Lane | | 2012 | 212 S. Water St. Crawfordsville; 40°02′22″N 86°53′53″W | Politics |
| Dr Mary Holloway Wilhite, 1831-1892 | | 2020 | Northwest corner of S. Grant Ave. and W. Wabash Ave., Crawfordsville; 40°02′22.7″N 86°54′15.7″W | Science, Medicine, & Invention; Women |

== See also ==
- List of Indiana state historical markers
- National Register of Historic Places listings in Montgomery County, Indiana
