= Greg Beumer =

American politician (born 1954)

Member of the Indiana House of Representatives from the 33rd district
- In office November 20, 2013 – November 20, 2018
- Preceded by: Bill Davis
- Succeeded by: John Prescott

Personal details
- Born: July 10, 1954 (age 72)
- Party: Republican
- Spouse: Kathy
- Children: 4
- Education: Ball State University; University of Oklahoma (BS)

Greg Beumer (born July 10, 1954) is an American politician who served in the Indiana House of Representatives from 2013 to 2018, representing the 33rd legislative district of Indiana as a Republican.

== Early life and education ==
Greg Beumer was born on July 10, 1954. He attended Ball State University and graduated from the University of Oklahoma with a Bachelor of Science degree.

== Career ==
Prior to serving in the Indiana General Assembly, Beumer was a Randolph County commissioner.

In 2013, Beumer was elected to serve the remaining 13 months of the term of his predecessor, Bill Davis, who resigned to become executive director of the Indiana Office of Community & Rural Affairs.

During his tenure in the Indiana General Assembly, Beumer served as vice chair of the House Committee on Environmental Affairs. He also served as a member of both the House Committee on Agriculture and Rural Development and the House Committee on Financial Institutions.

During his time in office, Beumer co-authored a bill expanding screenings for Indiana newborns, as well as a bill to increase funding for Indiana public schools. Additionally, he authored a bill preventing drug testing fraud, which was signed into law in 2016.

In 2016, Beumer ran unopposed in both the Republican primary in May and the general election in November.

In March 2018, Beumer announced his retirement as a state representative.

== Political positions ==
Beumer received a 100% rating from the Indiana Chamber of Commerce in 2018.

== Personal life ==
Beumer resides in Modoc, Indiana. He has a wife and four children.

Indiana House of Representatives
Preceded by Bill Davis	Member of the Indiana House of Representatives from the 33rd district 2013–2018	Succeeded by John Prescott
