= Ladoga, Indiana =

- Town
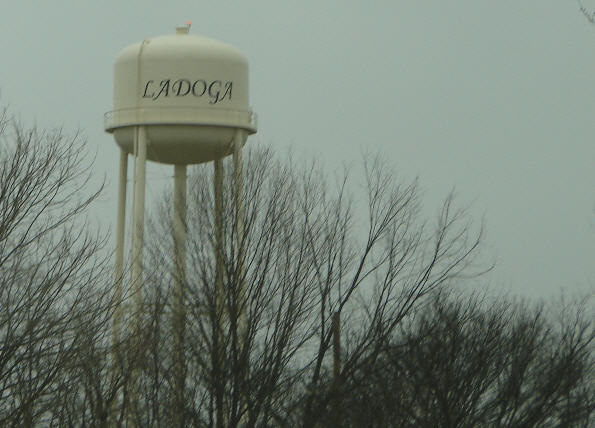

- Location in Montgomery County
- Coordinates: 39°55′00″N 86°47′57″W
- Country: United States
- State: Indiana
- County: Montgomery
- Township: Clark

Area
  - Total: 0.54 sq mi (1.39 km^{2})
  - Land: 0.54 sq mi (1.39 km^{2})
  - Water: 0 sq mi (0.00 km^{2})
- Elevation: 827 ft (252 m)

Population (2020)
  - Total: 1,081
  - Density: 2,013.1/sq mi (777.28/km^{2})
- Time zone: UTC-5 (Eastern (EST))
  - Summer (DST): UTC-5 (EST)
- ZIP code: 47954
- Area code: 765
- FIPS code: 18-40698
- GNIS feature ID: 2396702
- Website: www.townofladoga.org

Ladoga is a town in Clark Township, Montgomery County, in the U.S. state of Indiana. The population was 1,081 at the 2020 census, up from 985 in 2010.

== History ==
Ladoga was platted in 1836 by John Myers. Myers invited his friends to help him find a name. He required that the name not end in -burg or -ville and that it would not be named after another town. He chose "Ladoga" after finding Lake Ladoga on a map of Russia. In 1837, the town's post office was established, which still operates today.

In 1840 there were fifteen buildings in Ladoga, including two large stores selling general merchandise — one owned by Taylor Webster and one owned by William Nofsinger. By 1848, there were thirty families living in the town. The Haw Creek Academy was built two miles south of Ladoga in 1838 by the Christian Church. In 1855, the Ladoga Female Seminary was established by the Baptist Church, which quickly decided to allow male students, and shortly afterward the Ladoga Male Academy was established, which soon allowed female students. (Both decided to let in the other gender because of financial concerns.) Central Normal College was founded in Ladoga in 1876; it moved to Danville in 1878. The original building still stands in Ladoga. Known as Normal Hall, it was listed on the National Register of Historic Places in 1996.

=== Ferris wheel ===
The town of Ladoga lays claim to the Chicago World's Fair Ferris Wheel. Designed by Pittsburgh bridge-builder George Washington Gale Ferris Jr., Luther V. Rice of Ladoga agreed to build it. After the Chicago World's Fair, it was placed in Ferris Wheel Park for a while, then moved to St. Louis, Missouri, for its World's Fair.

== Geography ==
Ladoga is located in southeastern Montgomery County. Indiana State Road 234 passes through the town as Main Street, leading east 10 miles (16 km) to Jamestown and west 15 miles (24 km) to Shades State Park. Crawfordsville, the Montgomery county seat, is 11 miles (18 km) to the northwest, and Indianapolis is 38 miles (61 km) to the southeast.

According to the U.S. Census Bureau, Ladoga has a total area of 0.54 square miles (1.40 km^{2}), all land. Big Raccoon Creek crosses the southeast and southwest corners of the town, flowing southwest, then northwest to the Wabash River south of Montezuma.

== Demographics ==
Historical population
Census	Pop.	Note	%±
1870	878		—
1880	928		5.7%
1890	857		−7.7%
1900	1,176		37.2%
1910	1,148		−2.4%
1920	1,010		−12.0%
1930	829		−17.9%
1940	936		12.9%
1950	912		−2.6%
1960	974		6.8%
1970	1,099		12.8%
1980	1,151		4.7%
1990	1,124		−2.3%
2000	1,047		−6.9%
2010	985		−5.9%
2020	1,081		9.7%
U.S. Decennial Census

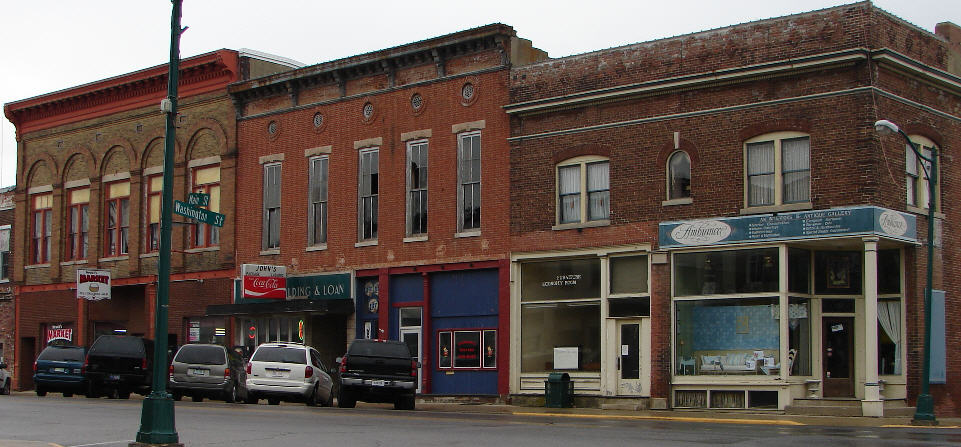
Downtown area of Ladoga - 2008

=== 2020 census ===
As of the 2020 census, Ladoga had a population of 1,081. The median age was 33.6 years. 28.3% of residents were under the age of 18 and 15.2% of residents were 65 years of age or older. For every 100 females there were 96.2 males, and for every 100 females age 18 and over there were 93.3 males age 18 and over.

0.0% of residents lived in urban areas, while 100.0% lived in rural areas.

There were 412 households in Ladoga, of which 38.6% had children under the age of 18 living in them. Of all households, 47.8% were married-couple households, 15.5% were households with a male householder and no spouse or partner present, and 24.3% were households with a female householder and no spouse or partner present. About 26.9% of all households were made up of individuals and 10.9% had someone living alone who was 65 years of age or older.

There were 445 housing units, of which 7.4% were vacant. The homeowner vacancy rate was 2.7% and the rental vacancy rate was 6.5%.

Racial composition as of the 2020 census
Race	Number	Percent
White	1,029	95.2%
Black or African American	7	0.6%
American Indian and Alaska Native	3	0.3%
Asian	4	0.4%
Native Hawaiian and Other Pacific Islander	2	0.2%
Some other race	7	0.6%
Two or more races	29	2.7%
Hispanic or Latino (of any race)	28	2.6%

=== 2010 census ===
As of the census of 2010, there were 985 people, 377 households, and 269 families residing in the town. The population density was 1,824.1 inhabitants per square mile (704.3/km^{2}). There were 449 housing units at an average density of 831.5 per square mile (321.0/km^{2}). The racial makeup of the town was 98.4% White, 0.1% African American, 0.3% Asian, 0.3% from other races, and 0.9% from two or more races. Hispanic or Latino of any race were 1.0% of the population.

There were 377 households, of which 38.5% had children under the age of 18 living with them, 53.8% were married couples living together, 11.7% had a female householder with no husband present, 5.8% had a male householder with no wife present, and 28.6% were non-families. 22.3% of all households were made up of individuals, and 10.9% had someone living alone who was 65 years of age or older. The average household size was 2.61 and the average family size was 3.04.

The median age in the town was 36.1 years. 28.3% of residents were under the age of 18; 8.7% were between the ages of 18 and 24; 25% were from 25 to 44; 26.1% were from 45 to 64; and 11.9% were 65 years of age or older. The gender makeup of the town was 49.6% male and 50.4% female.

=== 2000 census ===
As of the census of 2000, there were 1,047 people, 385 households, and 286 families residing in the town. The population density was 2,085.4 inhabitants per square mile (805.2/km^{2}). There were 421 housing units at an average density of 838.6 per square mile (323.8/km^{2}). The racial makeup of the town was 98.57% White, 0.19% African American, 0.29% Asian, 0.29% Pacific Islander, 0.29% from other races, and 0.38% from two or more races. Hispanic or Latino of any race were 0.57% of the population.

There were 385 households, out of which 37.9% had children under the age of 18 living with them, 57.9% were married couples living together, 9.9% had a female householder with no husband present, and 25.5% were non-families. 23.1% of all households were made up of individuals, and 12.2% had someone living alone who was 65 years of age or older. The average household size was 2.57 and the average family size was 2.99. In the town, the population was spread out, with 26.6% under the age of 18, 7.9% from 18 to 24, 26.9% from 25 to 44, 20.8% from 45 to 64, and 17.7% who were 65 years of age or older. The median age was 37 years. For every 100 females, there were 97.5 males. For every 100 females age 18 and over, there were 92.0 males.

The median income for a household in the town was $40,781, and the median income for a family was $43,917. Males had a median income of $31,100 versus $24,135 for females. The per capita income for the town was $16,163. About 6.4% of families and 7.7% of the population were below the poverty line, including 12.1% of those under age 18 and 8.7% of those age 65 or over.

== Education ==
South Montgomery Community School Corporation operates public schools serving New Ross. Ladoga Elementary School is in the area. Southmont Junior High School and Southmont High School serve secondary students.

The town has a lending library, the Ladoga-Clark Township Public Library.

== Notable people ==
- Joshua Harrison Bruce, farmer and Minnesota state legislator
- Adrian Marks, (Lieutenant Commander US Navy) instrumental in the rescue of 56 survivors of the USS Indianapolis
- Ed Summers, baseball player, pitched in 1908 World Series
