= J.D. Prescott =

American politician

Member of the Indiana House of Representatives from the 33rd district
- Incumbent
- Assumed office November 7, 2018
- Preceded by: Greg Beumer

Personal details
- Party: Republican

John "J.D." Prescott is an American politician. He serves as a Republican member for the 33rd district of the Indiana House of Representatives.

In 2018, Prescott was elected for the 33rd district of the Indiana House of Representatives, assuming office on November 7, 2018.

== Elections ==
Indiana House District 33 Republican primary, May 8, 2018
Party	Candidate	Votes	%
Republican	J.D. Prescott	4,472	61.2
Republican	Jenae Horn Blasdel	2,834	38.8
Total votes		7,306	100.0

Indiana House District 33 general election, November 6, 2018
Party	Candidate	Votes	%
Republican	J.D. Prescott	12,966	61.3
Democratic	Shon Byrum	7,161	33.8
Libertarian	Dale Arnett	1,034	4.9
Total votes		21,161	100.0

Indiana House District 33 Republican primary, June 2, 2020
Party	Candidate	Votes	%
Republican	J.D. Prescott (incumbent)	5,260	69.4
Republican	Brittany Bridges Kloer	2,316	30.6
Total votes		7,576	100.0

Indiana House District 33 general election, November 3, 2020
Party	Candidate	Votes	%
Republican	J.D. Prescott (incumbent)	20,198	72.5
Democratic	Julie Snider	7,649	27.5
Total votes		27,847	100.0

Indiana House District 33 Republican primary, May 3, 2022
Party	Candidate	Votes	%
Republican	J.D. Prescott (incumbent)	4,722	58.0
Republican	Brittany Bridges Kloer	3,421	42.0
Total votes		8,143	100.0

Indiana House District 33 general election, November 8, 2022
Party	Candidate	Votes	%
Republican	J.D. Prescott (incumbent)	13,979	70.4
Democratic	John E. Bartlett	5,882	29.6
Total votes		19,861	100.0

Indiana House District 33 Republican primary, May 7, 2024
Party	Candidate	Votes	%
Republican	J.D. Prescott (incumbent)	6,035	70.7
Republican	Gregory LeMaster	2,506	29.3
Total votes		8,541	100.0

Indiana House District 33 general election, November 5, 2024
Party	Candidate	Votes	%
Republican	J.D. Prescott (incumbent)	21,160	73.0
Democratic	John E. Bartlett	7,818	27.0
Total votes		28,978	100.0

Indiana House District 33 Republican primary, May 5, 2026
Party	Candidate	Votes	%
Republican	J.D. Prescott (incumbent, unopposed)	5,945	100.0
Total votes		5,945	100.0

Indiana House District 33 general election, November 3, 2026 (unofficial results)
Party	Candidate	Votes	%
Republican	J.D. Prescott (incumbent)	10,570	58.1
Democratic	John E. Bartlett	7,620	41.9
Total votes		18,190	100.0
