= Clark Township, Montgomery County, Indiana =

Clark Township
- Township
- Location in Montgomery County
- Coordinates: 39°54′21″N 86°45′30″W
- Country: United States
- State: Indiana
- County: Montgomery

Government
  - Type: Indiana township

Area
  - Total: 36.31 sq mi (94.0 km^{2})
  - Land: 36.29 sq mi (94.0 km^{2})
  - Water: 0.02 sq mi (0.052 km^{2}) 0.06%
- Elevation: 879 ft (268 m)

Population (2020)
  - Total: 1,841
  - Density: 50.73/sq mi (19.59/km^{2})
- Time zone: UTC-5 (Eastern (EST))
  - Summer (DST): UTC-4 (EDT)
- ZIP codes: 46172, 47954, 47968
- Area code: 765
- GNIS feature ID: 453202

Clark Township is one of eleven townships in Montgomery County, Indiana, United States. As of the 2020 census, its population was 1,841 (representing no change from 2010) and it contained 766 housing units.

Clark Township was founded in 1830.

== Geography ==
According to the 2010 census, the township has a total area of 36.31 square miles (94.0 km^{2}), of which 36.29 square miles (94.0 km^{2}) (or 99.94%) is land and 0.02 square miles (0.052 km^{2}) (or 0.06%) is water.

=== Cities, towns, villages ===
- Ladoga

=== Cemeteries ===
The township contains these six cemeteries: Harshbarger, Hicks, Inlow, Mount Pleasant, Stoner and Wesley.

=== Major highways ===
- U.S. Route 136

=== Lakes ===
- Morrison Lake

== Education ==
- South Montgomery Community School Corporation

Clark Township residents are served by the Ladoga-Clark Township Public Library.

== Political districts ==
- Indiana's 4th congressional district
- State House District 28
- State Senate District 23
