= General Lew Wallace Study =

Museum in Crawfordsville, Indiana

- Gen. Lew Wallace Study
- U.S. National Register of Historic Places
- U.S. National Historic Landmark
- U.S. Historic district – Contributing property
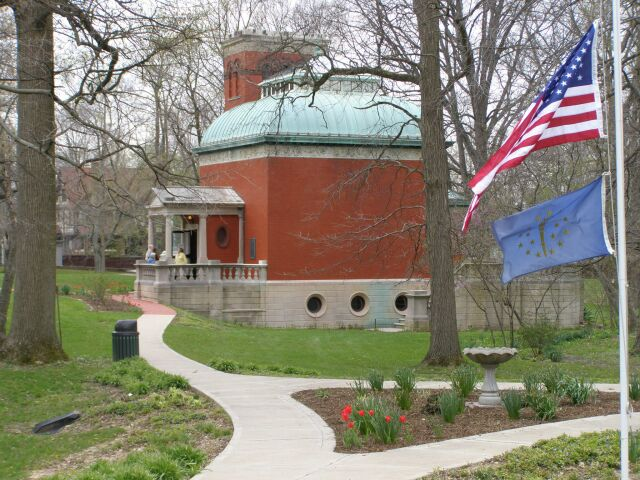
- Gen. Lew Wallace Study

- Location within Indiana Location within the United States
- Location: 200 Wallace Ave., Crawfordsville, Indiana, United States
- Coordinates: 40°2′26″N 86°53′40″W
- Built: 1895
- Architect: Wallace, Gen. Lew
- Architectural style: Greek Revival, Other, Romanesque
- Part of: Elston Grove Historic District (ID92000187)
- NRHP reference No.: 76000013

Significant dates
- Added to NRHP: May 11, 1976
- Designated NHL: May 11, 1976
- Designated CP: March 25, 1992

The General Lew Wallace Study & Museum, formerly known as the Ben-Hur Museum, is located in Crawfordsville, Indiana. It was declared a National Historic Landmark in 1976, and in 2008 was awarded a National Medal from the federal Institute of Museum and Library Services. It is located in the Elston Grove Historic District. The museum is associated with the life of Lew Wallace and his 1880 novel Ben-Hur: A Tale of the Christ. The study, designed by Wallace, and accompanying carriage house are the only structures pertaining to Lew Wallace that have retained historical integrity. Both of these buildings now make up the museum and exhibit many of the artifacts that Wallace used during his lifetime, as well as many objects pertaining to his literary legacy. Guided tours of the study are available for a small admission fee; the Carriage House Interpretive Center and grounds are open to the public free of charge.

== History ==
Lew Wallace is most famous for his military service and his novel Ben-Hur: A Tale of the Christ (1880). He served in the Union Army during the American Civil War, participating in the Battle of Fort Donelson, Battle of Shiloh, and Battle of Monocacy as well as managing operations for the Union Army in Indiana in July 1863 when Confederate general John Hunt Morgan invaded the state during Morgan's Raid. After the war, he served on the military commission that tried John Wilkes Booth's assistants in the assassination of Abraham Lincoln, as well as presiding over the court that resulted in the execution of Henry Wirz for the Union deaths at Andersonville prison.

In the postwar years, he began seriously writing, publishing his first novel in 1873. In 1880, he published Ben-Hur: A Tale of the Christ, a novel set during the time of Jesus Christ in the Roman Empire; it sold poorly at first, but soon became the bestselling novel of the nineteenth century, and continued as first until the publication of Gone with the Wind. Considered "the most influential Christian book of the nineteenth century," it has never gone out of print, and has been adapted for four films. In addition, Wallace worked as a lawyer, governor to New Mexico Territory, and ambassador to Turkey. His creative pursuits included a total of seven books: novels and biographies; art, inventing, and music.

Wallace was said to have built the study because he wanted "a pleasure-house for my soul," that would be "a detached room away from the world and its worries." Wallace died in his home on February 15, 1905. Upon his death, his family allowed the public to tour his study. In 1941 the city of Crawfordsville was given the property by a local civic organization, which purchased the property to donate it to the city.

Wallace's former house was mostly razed, with only its dining room, living room, and floored central hall remaining as part of a modern ranch-style house; it is not part of the National Register designation.

The carriage house opened in 2006 as the Carriage House Interpretive Center, and is now the launching point for visitor experiences. Formerly used by the Girl Scouts and the Camp Fire Girls, it houses an exhibit that changes annually, gift shop, orientation video, offices and collection storage.

== Architecture ==
The study took three years to finish, from 1895 to 1898, and cost $25,000–$30,000 to build. Wallace built the eclectic structure with influence from Byzantine, Greek, and Romanesque styles. It is one-story and made of garnet-colored brick. The domed copper roof is 30 feet (9.1 m) tall, with a cupola of copper, glass and steel protecting a large skylight over the main room. Bedford limestone, native to southern Indiana, was used for the porches and exterior trim. The limestone frieze, crowning the top of the walls, was hand-carved. A face in the center of the frieze on each side of the building represents characters from two of General Wallace's books. On the tower is Princess Irene, on the back is the Prince of India, both from The Prince of India; to the east is Ben-Hur's sister, Tirzah, and over the entry is Judah Ben-Hur, both from Ben-Hur: A Tale of the Christ. The small curved room in the back of the building was the mechanical room, housing light switches, levers that opened windows in the cupola on the dome, and other features related to the building. The bricks used to make the semicircle are curved. The study includes a 40 feet (12 m) tall tower on the west side. The tower was designed with Roman arches that were originally bricked in except for two stained glass windows. The tower, besides being decorative, served as a chimney and storage for the water tank that supplied the original bathroom in the basement. The full basement can be seen through round porthole windows on the east side of the building. It holds the workbench which General Wallace used when creating his nine inventions, the furnace used to heat the building, and the Wallaces’ carriage. The underpinnings of the study are also visible: Carnegie steel I-beams, corrugated metal, and concrete.

== Today ==
When the city of Crawfordsville acquired the structure, it became known as the Ben-Hur Museum; it is officially called the General Lew Wallace Study & Museum. It still exhibits many of the 1,200 books Wallace owned. The furniture in the study is original, including the chair that Wallace used when writing his masterwork, Ben-Hur (which he completed long before building the study). Among the other artifacts in the collection are his military uniforms, artwork, musical instruments, and the fishing rod he invented. Art includes the portrait of the daughter of the sultan of Turkey, which he gave to Wallace in 1885. The annual exhibits in the Carriage House Interpretive Center highlight different facets of Wallace as a Renaissance man; previous exhibits include Collective Influence: The Wallace Women, Lew Wallace - Gentleman Scientist, and Embattled: General Wallace's Leadership in the Civil War. The 3.5 acres (14,000 m^{2}) of land on which the study sits is a public park, and many use it as a place to picnic, walk dogs, and take family photographs amid the flower beds. In recent years it has seen increased use from geo-cachers searching for a cache on site.

Guided tours of the study are available for a small admission fee; the Carriage House Interpretive Center and grounds are open to the public free of charge.

== See also ==
- List of museums in Indiana
- List of National Historic Landmarks in Indiana
- National Register of Historic Places listings in Montgomery County, Indiana
