= Joshua Harrison Bruce =

American politician

Joshua Harrison Bruce Sr. (March 22, 1833 – April 22, 1891) was an American farmer and politician.

Bruce was born in Ladoga, Montgomery County, Indiana. He settled in Sauk Centre, Minnesota, with his wife and family, in 1863, and was a farmer. Harrison served in the Minnesota House of Representatives in 1885 and 1886. He died in 1891 after a brief illness.
