= Adrian Marks =

U.S. Navy pilot (1917–1998)

- Born: February 18, 1917; Ladoga, Indiana, US
- Died: March 7, 1998 (aged 81); Frankfort, Indiana, US
- Spouse: Elta Roll (m. 1941)
- Children: 5
- Military career
- Allegiance: United States
- Branch: United States Navy
- Service years: 1941–1945
- Rank: Lieutenant Commander
- Conflicts: World War II: Attack on Pearl Harbor; Rescue of the Indianapolis crew
- Awards: Air Medal

Lieutenant Commander (USN) Robert Adrian Marks (February 18, 1917 – March 7, 1998) was the U.S. Navy pilot who rescued 56 crewmen of the USS Indianapolis after it was sunk by Japanese torpedoes. Marks disobeyed standing orders not to land in open ocean and rescued survivors by lashing them to the wing. His actions rendered the aircraft unflyable. He was awarded the Air Medal by Chester W. Nimitz. After the rescue, the plane was sunk by U.S. forces as it was not able to be recovered.

== Early life ==
Adrian Marks was born in Ladoga, Indiana on February 18, 1917. His father Robert William Marks was a lawyer and his mother Zena May Caldwell was a music teacher.

Marks was a graduate of Northwestern University and earned a law degree from Indiana University School of Law. He married Elta Roll in 1941, and soon joined the Navy prior to the United States' entry into World War II.

== World War II ==
Marks was stationed in Pearl Harbor when the Japanese attacked the base on December 7, 1941. After the attack and the U.S. entry into the war, he attended flight school and became a Naval Aviator.

=== Rescue of USS Indianapolis survivors ===
The heavy cruiser USS Indianapolis delivered components for the Little Boy atomic bomb, later used in the atomic bombing of Hiroshima, to the island of Tinian on 26 July. Afterwards, it steamed, unescorted, to Leyte for training of new crew members in advance of the planned attack on the Japanese home islands. On 30 July 1945, during this voyage, the Indianapolis was hit by two torpedoes shortly after midnight. The ship listed, took on water, and capsized within twelve minutes, with a third of the crew going down with the ship. As a result of error, no distress signal had been broadcast, and the ship was not noticed as missing for days after the sinking. Some 900 survivors, many in only life jackets and without other flotation, faced fatigue, dehydration under the daylight sun and hypothermia at night, salt-water poisoning, and shark attacks. Of the approximately 900 who abandoned ship, a total of 316 survived, with 56 of them being saved by Marks.

On August 2, a land-based patrol plane spotted the heads of survivors bobbing on the water but was unable to identify them. Marks and his flight crew were dispatched to the scene to investigate in his amphibious PBY-5A Catalina patrol plane. He spotted the survivors and dropped life rafts. One life raft was destroyed by the drop while others were too far away from the exhausted crew. Against standing orders not to land in open ocean, Marks took a vote of his crew and decided to land the aircraft in twelve-foot swells. He was able to maneuver his craft to pick up survivors. Space in the craft was limited so Marks had survivors lashed to the wing with parachute cord. It damaged the wings, rendering the aircraft unflyable.

Marks rescued 56 men. After nightfall, the destroyer escort USS Cecil J. Doyle (DE 368), the first of seven rescue ships, used its search light as a beacon and instilled hope in those still in the water. The Doyle and others picked up the remaining survivors and after everyone was off Marks' PBY, the Doyle sank her.

Marks was awarded the Air Medal for his actions, and it was pinned on him by Fleet Admiral Chester Nimitz, CINCPAC.

== Later life ==
Following the war, Marks returned to Frankfort, Indiana and practiced real-estate law. He died on March 7, 1998, aged 81. He was survived by his wife Elta, five children, and twelve grandchildren.
