= Culver Union Hospital =

Historic hospital building in Indiana, US

- U.S. National Register of Historic Places
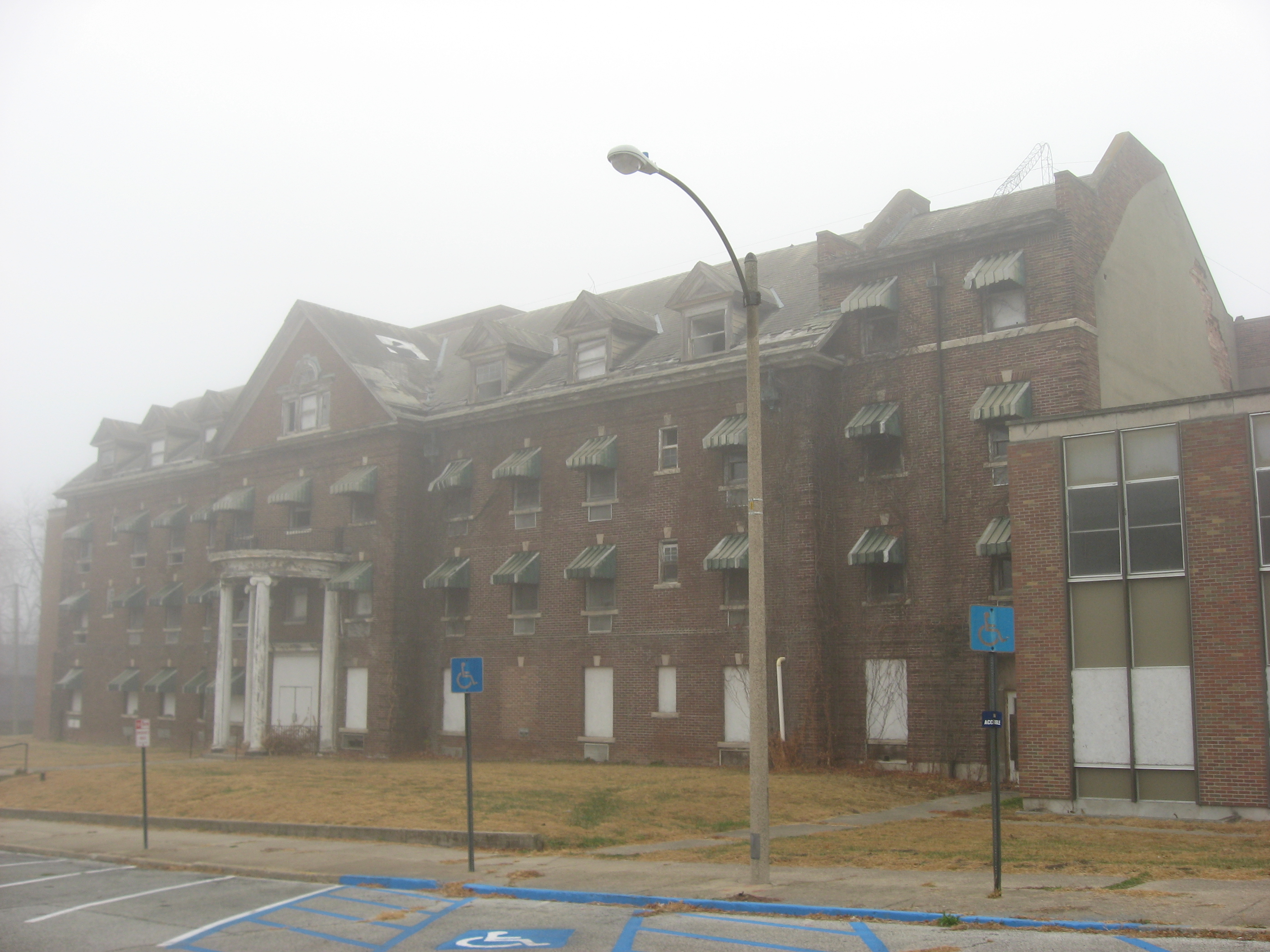
- Culver Union Hospital, November 2010

- Location within Indiana Location within the United States
- Location: 306 Binford St., Crawfordsville, Indiana
- Coordinates: 40°2′40″N 86°53′48″W
- Area: 3.8 acres (1.5 ha)
- Built: 1902, 1940-1942, 1966, 1971, 1977
- Architect: Beeson, Carroll O.
- Architectural style: Colonial Revival, International Style
- NRHP reference No.: 01000402
- Added to NRHP: April 25, 2001

Culver Union Hospital is a historic hospital building located at Crawfordsville, Indiana. It was built in 1902 and was named after L.L. Culver, whose wife, Mrs. Mary Culver, donated $10,000 towards the construction in honor of her late husband. The building is a four-story, rectangular, Colonial Revival style brick structure. It is 13 bays wide and has a central projecting entry bay and gable roof. It features a two-story, open and circular entry porch supported by Ionic order columns. Additions were made to the original building in 1940–1942, 1966, 1971, and 1977. The building was closed in 1984 due to being unsafe inside the building. In 2016 the building was converted to an apartment complex by Flaherty and Collins Properties. The property is now known as Historic Whitlock Place.

It was listed on the National Register of Historic Places in 2001.
