= Crawfordsville, Indiana =

- City
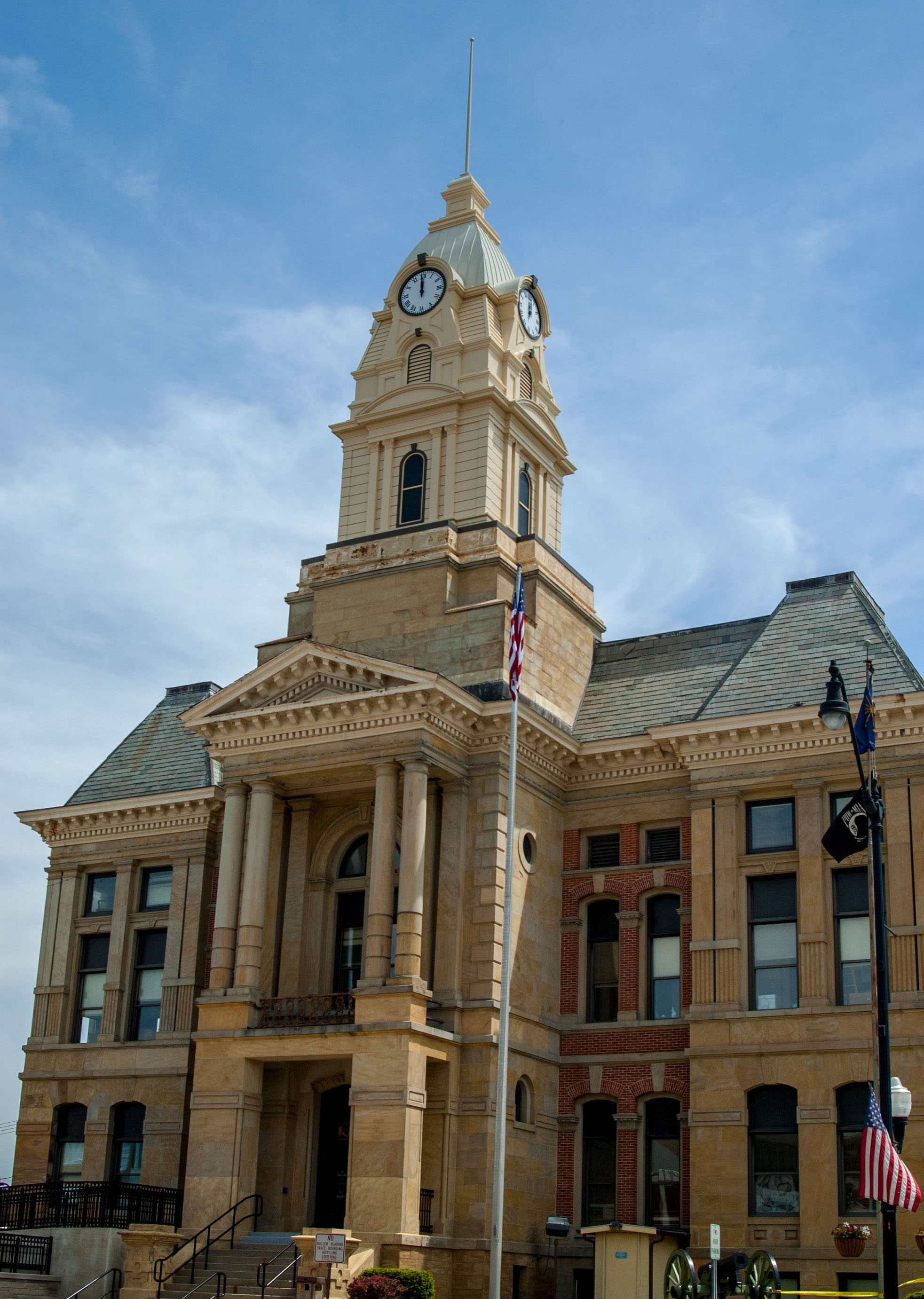
- Montgomery County Courthouse in 2018

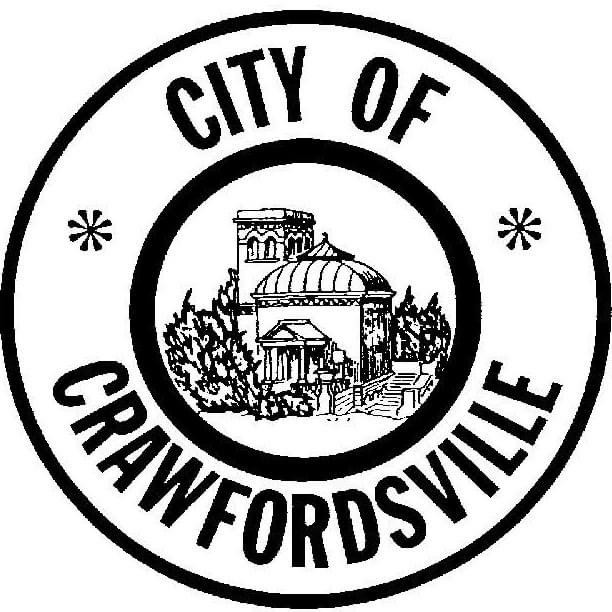
- Seal
- Nickname: "Athens of Indiana" (William Compton, 1825)
- Location of Crawfordsville in Montgomery County, Indiana.

- Crawfordsville's location in Montgomery County
- Coordinates: 40°02′30″N 86°53′48″W
- Country: United States
- State: Indiana
- County: Montgomery
- Township: Union

Government
  - Mayor: Todd Barton (R)

Area
  - Total: 9.70 sq mi (25.11 km^{2})
  - Land: 9.70 sq mi (25.11 km^{2})
  - Water: 0 sq mi (0.00 km^{2})
- Elevation: 758 ft (231 m)

Population (2020)
  - Total: 16,306
  - Density: 1,682/sq mi (649.3/km^{2})
- Time zone: UTC-5 (Eastern (EST))
  - Summer (DST): UTC-4 (EDT)
- ZIP codes: 47933-47939
- Area code: 765
- FIPS code: 18-15742
- GNIS feature ID: 2393664
- Website: www.crawfordsville.in.gov

Crawfordsville (/ˈkrɑːfərdsˌvil/) is a city in Montgomery County in west central Indiana, United States, 49 miles (79 km) west by northwest of Indianapolis. As of the 2020 census, the city had a population of 16,306. The city is the county seat of Montgomery County, the only chartered city and the largest populated place in the county. It is the principal city of the Crawfordsville, IN Micropolitan Statistical Area, which encompasses all of Montgomery County. The city is also part of the Indianapolis–Carmel–Muncie, IN Combined Statistical Area.

The city was founded in 1823 on the bank of Sugar Creek, a southern tributary of the Wabash River and named for U.S. Treasury Secretary William H. Crawford. The city is home to Wabash College, a private liberal arts men's college, and the General Lew Wallace Study & Museum, a National Historic Landmark.

== History ==
=== Early 19th century ===
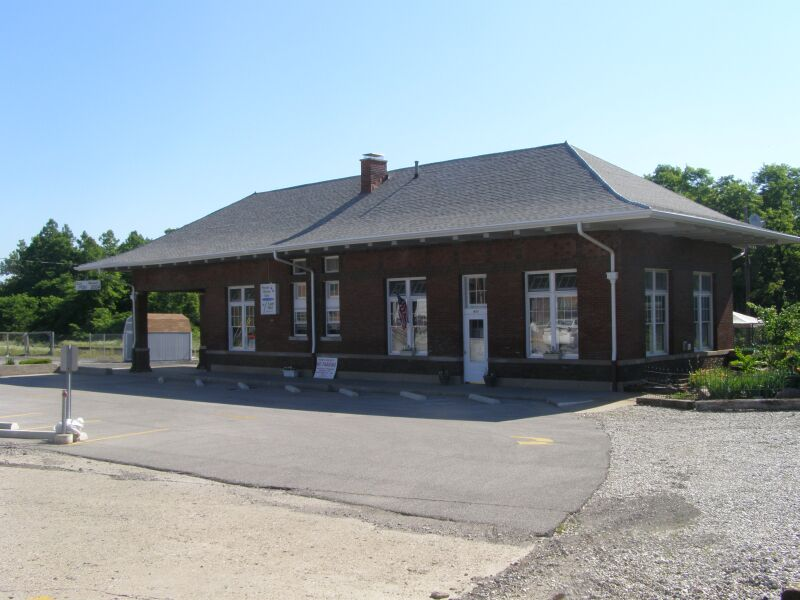
Amtrak Station located behind the historic station, now a meeting facility.

In 1813, Williamson Dunn, Henry Ristine, and Major Ambrose Whitlock, U.S. Army, noted that the site of present-day Crawfordsville was ideal for settlement, surrounded by deciduous forest and potentially arable land, with water provided by a nearby creek, later named Sugar Creek, that was a southern tributary of the Wabash River. They returned a decade later to find at least one cabin had been built in the area. In 1821, William and Jennie Offield had built a cabin on a little creek, later to be known as Offield Creek, four miles (6.4 km) southwest of the future site of Crawfordsville.

Whitlock, a Virginian who had served under Gen. "Mad" Anthony Wayne in the Northwest Indian War, laid out the town in March 1823. Crawfordsville was named in honor of William H. Crawford, a fellow Virginian who was Secretary of the Treasury under Presidents Madison and Monroe at that time and who had issued Whitlock's commission as Receiver of Public Lands. Whitlock was the first settler in the town.

According to a diary of Sanford C. Cox, who in 1824 was one of the first schoolmasters in the area, "Crawfordsville is the only town between Terre Haute and Fort Wayne... Maj. Ristine keeps tavern in a two-story log house and Jonathan Powers has a little grocery. There are two stores, Smith's near the land office, and Issac C. Elston's, near the tavern... David Vance [is the] sheriff."

It was successfully incorporated as a town in 1834, following a failed attempt three years earlier.

In November 1832, Wabash College was founded in Crawfordsville as "The Wabash Teachers Seminary and Manual Labor College". It was created by Presbyterian missionaries but later became non-sectarian. On December 18, 1833, the Crawfordsville Record carried a paid announcement of the opening of this school. The school is one of only three remaining all-male liberal arts colleges in the country and has a student body of around 900.

In 1842, 9-year-old Horace Hovey discovered remarkably well-preserved Pentacrinites or Crinoids along the banks of Sugar Creek, which drew researchers and fossil enthusiasts to the area.

Crawfordsville grew in size and amenities, adding such necessities as a bank and fire department. It gained status as a city in 1865 when the state of Indiana granted its charters.

=== Late 19th century ===
In 1862, Joseph F. Tuttle, after whom Tuttle Grade School was named in 1906 and Tuttle Junior High School (now Crawfordsville Middle School) was named in 1960, became president of Wabash College and served for 30 years. "He was an eloquent preacher, a sound administrator and an astute handler of public relations." Tuttle, together with his administrators, worked to improve relations in Crawfordsville between "Town and Gown".

Several future and past Civil War generals lived in Crawfordsville at different times. Generals Lew Wallace and Mahlon D. Manson spent most of their lives in the town. Generals Edward Canby and John P. Hawkins spent some of their youth in Crawfordsville. General Henry B. Carrington lived in the town after the war and taught military science at Wabash College. Several other future generals were students at Wabash before the war, including Joseph J. Reynolds, John C. Black (brevet brigadier), Speed S. Fry, Charles Cruft, and William H. Morgan.

In 1880, prominent local citizen Lew Wallace produced Crawfordsville's most famous literary work, Ben-Hur: A Tale of the Christ, a historical novel dealing with the beginnings of Christianity in the Mediterranean world. In addition to Wallace, Crawfordsville lived up to its nickname "The Athens of Indiana" by being the hometown of a number of authors, including Maurice Thompson, Mary Hannah Krout, Caroline Virginia Krout, Susan Wallace, Will H. Thompson, and Meredith Nicholson.

Hoosiers have long believed that the first basketball game in Indiana occurred on March 16, 1894, at the Crawfordsville YMCA between the teams from Crawfordsville's and Lafayette's YMCAs. Recent research, however, conclusively shows that while Crawfordsville was among the first dozen or so Indiana communities to adopt the sport, it was not the first place basketball was played in Indiana. Nevertheless, Crawfordsville had a vibrant basketball playing culture from early on with teams from the local YMCA, Wabash College, Crawfordsville High School, and a business college competing against each other. Crawfordsville was also the site for one of the earliest intercollegiate basketball games, between Wabash College and Purdue University, in 1894 at the city's YMCA.

In 1882, one of the first rotary jails in the country opened. It served from 1882 until 1972. The Montgomery County Jail and Sheriff's Residence is now a museum and listed on the National Register of Historic Places.

=== 20th century ===
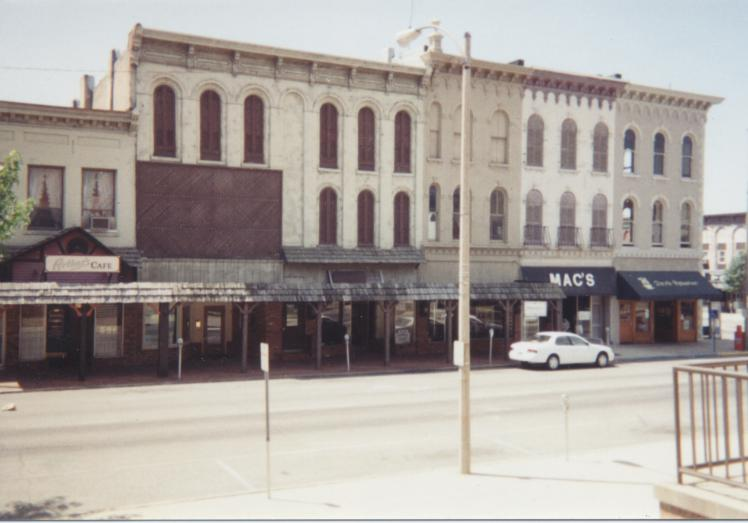
Washington and Main streets from the courthouse in 1997

The beginning of the 20th century marked important steps for Crawfordsville, as Culver Union Hospital and the Carnegie Library were built in 1902. Culver operated as a not-for-profit, municipally owned facility for 80 years, but was then sold to for-profit American Medical International, and in 1984 was relocated from its original location near downtown to a new campus north of the city. The hospital's ownership was transferred to Sisters of St. Francis Health Services, Inc. in 2000 and renamed St. Clare Medical Center. In 2011, it was again renamed, to Franciscan St. Elizabeth Health - Crawfordsville. The electric interurban railway to Lebanon opened in 1904, offering fast frequent transportation to Indianapolis and Lafayette. This was followed in 1907 with the Ben Hur Route, which ran directly to Indianapolis. In 1911, Crawfordsville High School was founded, and promptly won the state's first high school basketball title. Crawfordsville's major employer for much of the century, commercial printer RR Donnelley, began operations in Crawfordsville in 1922.

In 1910, the city limits were expanded to annex the adjoining towns of Englewood, Fiskville, Highland, and Longview.

Recent history has held few nationally noteworthy events for the city but much internal change. Nucor Steel, CSI Closures (formerly Alcoa), Raybestos Products Company, Pace Dairy Foods, and Random House have all created factories in or near Crawfordsville which provided employment to much of the population. Manpower has taken over as the primary employer in the city and has allowed most of the local companies to reduce employees. In 2008, Raybestos laid off the majority of its workforce with less than 100 employees left. Wabash College won the Division III NCAA basketball title in 1982. The college plays an annual football game against Depauw University for the Monon Bell, one of the oldest rivalries in all college sports. In 1998, the state began a proposed project to widen U.S. Route 231, in an attempt to ease intrastate travel flow.

=== 21st century ===
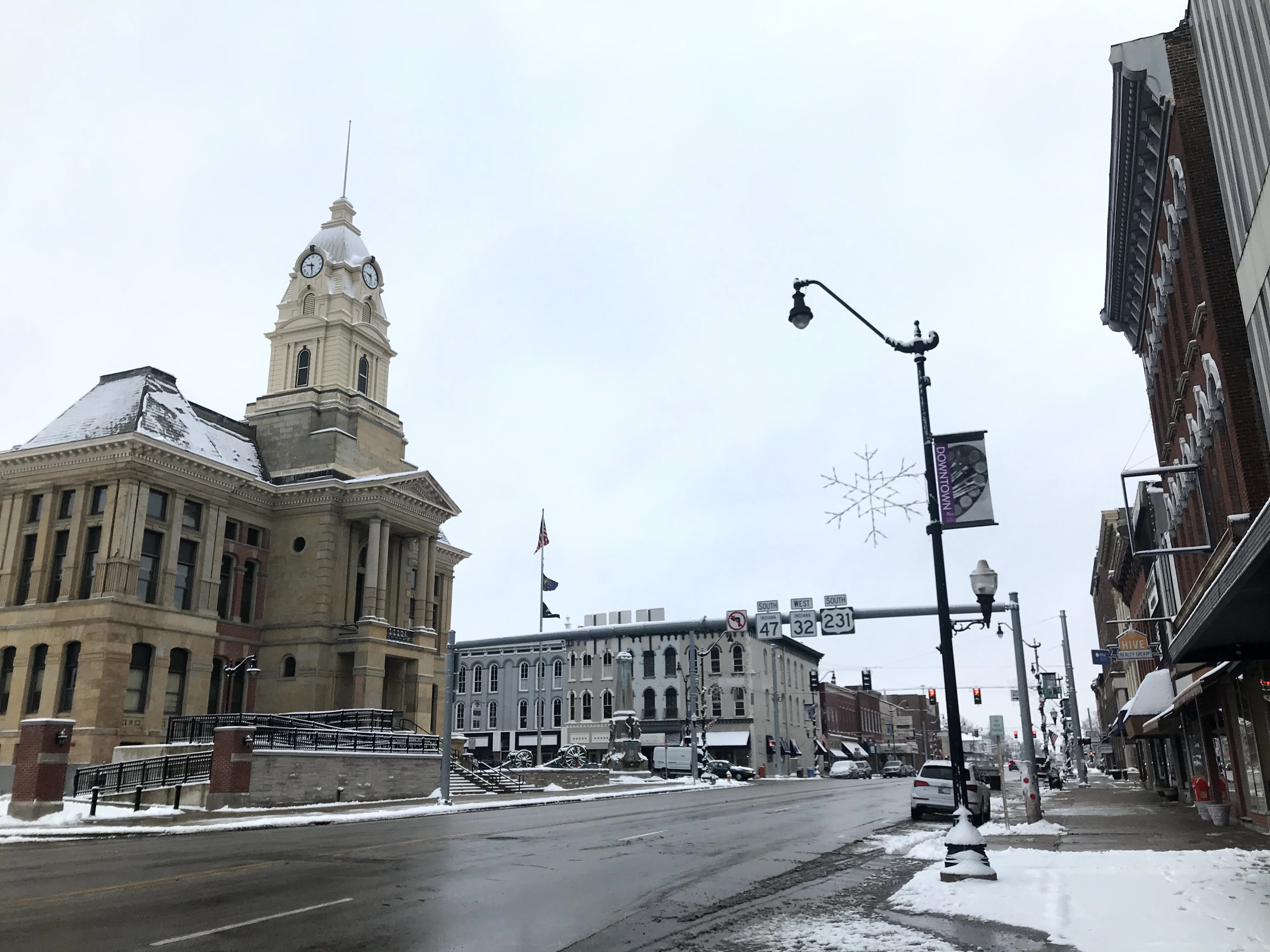
Downtown Crawfordsville looking south on U.S. 231

In 2005, the Crawfordsville District Public Library moved into a new building across the street from the city's Carnegie library. The library retained ownership of the old building and re-opened it as the Carnegie Museum of Montgomery County in 2007.

On May 8, 2007, approximately a quarter-block of historic buildings in the 100 block of South Washington Street was burned in a major fire. A woman in one of the buildings reported the fire. One person, Leslie Eric Largent, died in the fire. The fire was covered by the press statewide. Two buildings, built circa 1882, were completely destroyed: one housed the Silver Dollar Bar (formerly Tommy Kummings' Silver Dollar Tavern); the other contained the New York Shoe Repair and Bargain Center at the corner of Pike and Washington streets. Above the shoe store were several apartments where residents were sleeping. On May 22, the fire was ruled to have been an act of arson.

In 2015, Crawfordsville won a Stellar Community grant from Indiana Office of Community & Rural Affairs.

On May 17, 2018, a new clock tower built by Kentucky-based Campbellsville Industries was put into place on the courthouse's original clock tower base. The original clock tower had been taken down in 1941 due to structural concerns. The clock tower was made possible by the Montgomery County Courthouse Clock Tower Committee and its fundraising efforts spanning more than twenty years. The clock tower was dedicated on June 17, and the bells and chimes were sounded for the first time.

=== National Register of Historic Places ===
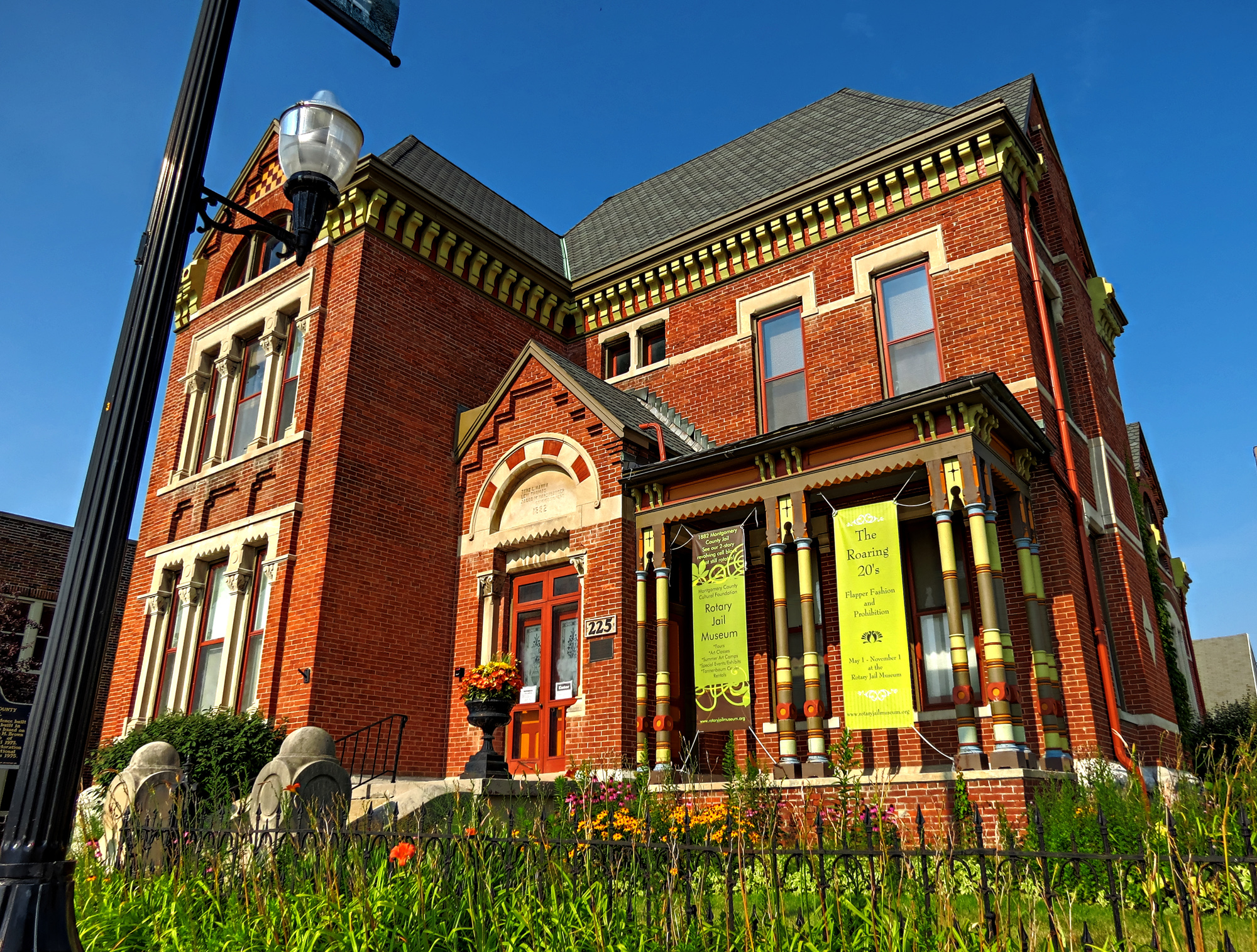
Montgomery County Jail and Sheriff's Residence, home to the Rotary Jail Museum

As of 2016, Crawfordsville has twelve properties listed on the National Register of Historic Places. Three of the properties are currently museums: Gen. Lew Wallace Study, Henry S. Lane House, and Montgomery County Jail and Sheriff's Residence. Two of the properties are historic districts: Crawfordsville Commercial Historic District, and Elston Grove Historic District. Two listings are active churches: Bethel AME Church of Crawfordsville, and Saint John's Episcopal Church. The other properties are currently used as a law office (Otto Schlemmer Building), senior apartments and recreation center (Crawfordsville High School), a private residence (McClelland-Layne House), the headquarters of the local Daughters of the American Revolution chapter (Col. Isaac C. Elston House), and a former hospital renovated for senior apartments Culver Union Hospital.

== Geography ==
According to the 2010 census, Crawfordsville has a total area of 9.15 square miles (23.70 km^{2}), all land. The city is located in west-central Indiana, about an hour west-northwest of Indianapolis, the state's capital and largest city. Crawfordsville is the principal city of the Crawfordsville, IN Micropolitan Area, which is included in the larger Indianapolis–Carmel–Muncie, IN Combined Statistical Area.

== Demographics ==
Historical population
Census	Pop.	Note	%±
1840	1,327		—
1850	1,513		14.0%
1860	1,922		27.0%
1870	3,701		92.6%
1880	5,251		41.9%
1890	6,089		16.0%
1900	6,649		9.2%
1910	9,371		40.9%
1920	10,139		8.2%
1930	10,355		2.1%
1940	11,089		7.1%
1950	12,851		15.9%
1960	14,231		10.7%
1970	13,842		−2.7%
1980	13,325		−3.7%
1990	13,584		1.9%
2000	15,243		12.2%
2010	15,915		4.4%
2020	16,306		2.5%
U.S. Decennial Census

=== 2020 census ===
As of the 2020 census, Crawfordsville had a population of 16,306. The median age was 37.6 years. 22.4% of residents were under the age of 18 and 18.7% of residents were 65 years of age or older. For every 100 females there were 98.6 males, and for every 100 females age 18 and over there were 98.4 males age 18 and over.

99.1% of residents lived in urban areas, while 0.9% lived in rural areas.

There were 6,685 households in Crawfordsville, of which 28.3% had children under the age of 18 living in them. Of all households, 36.7% were married-couple households, 21.1% were households with a male householder and no spouse or partner present, and 32.4% were households with a female householder and no spouse or partner present. About 36.5% of all households were made up of individuals and 15.8% had someone living alone who was 65 years of age or older.

There were 7,301 housing units, of which 8.4% were vacant. The homeowner vacancy rate was 2.5% and the rental vacancy rate was 7.7%.

Racial composition as of the 2020 census
Race	Number	Percent
White	13,946	85.5%
Black or African American	263	1.6%
American Indian and Alaska Native	76	0.5%
Asian	159	1.0%
Native Hawaiian and Other Pacific Islander	7	0.0%
Some other race	902	5.5%
Two or more races	953	5.8%
Hispanic or Latino (of any race)	1,677	10.3%

=== 2010 census ===
As of the census of 2010, there were 15,915 people, 6,396 households, and 3,837 families residing in the city. The population density was 1,739.3 inhabitants per square mile (671.5/km^{2}). There were 7,154 housing units at an average density of 781.9 per square mile (301.9/km^{2}). The racial makeup of the city was 92.1% White, 1.7% African American, 0.4% Native American, 0.9% Asian, 3.3% from other races, and 1.6% from two or more races. Hispanic or Latino of any race were 8.2% of the population.

There were 6,396 households, of which 30.3% had children under the age of 18 living with them, 40.8% were married couples living together, 13.6% had a female householder with no husband present, 5.6% had a male householder with no wife present, and 40.0% were non-families. 33.7% of all households were made up of individuals, and 14% had someone living alone who was 65 years of age or older. The average household size was 2.31 and the average family size was 2.91.

The median age in the city was 36.6 years. 22.3% of residents were under the age of 18; 13.4% were between the ages of 18 and 24; 24% were from 25 to 44; 23.4% were from 45 to 64, and 16.9% were 65 years of age or older. The gender makeup of the city was 50.1% male and 49.9% female.

=== 2000 census ===
As of the 2000 census, there were 15,243 people, 6,117 households, and 3,664 families residing in the city. The population density was 1,819.4 inhabitants per square mile (702.5/km^{2}). There were 6,623 housing units at an average density of 790.5 per square mile (305.2/km^{2}). The racial makeup of the city was 94.02% White, 1.61% African American, 0.31% Native American, 0.70% Asian, 0.07% Pacific Islander, 2.39% from other races, and 0.91% from two or more races. Hispanic or Latino of any race were 3.25% of the population.

There were 6,117 households, out of which 29.2% had children under the age of 18 living with them, 45.0% were married couples living together, 11.2% had a female householder with no husband present, and 40.1% were non-families. 33.9% of all households were made up of individuals, and 14.5% had someone living alone who was 65 years of age or older. The average household size was 2.30 and the average family size was 2.94.

In the city, the population was spread out, with 23.3% under the age of 18, 13.4% from 18 to 24, 27.3% from 25 to 44, 19.6% from 45 to 64, and 16.5% who were 65 years of age or older. The median age was 35 years. For every 100 females, there were 98.8 males. For every 100 females age 18 and over, there were 97.1 males.

The median income for a household in the city was $34,571, and the median income for a family was $43,211. Males had a median income of $32,834 versus $22,093 for females. The per capita income for the city was $16,945. About 10.0% of families and 12.9% of the population were below the poverty line, including 18.9% of those under age 18 and 7.0% of those age 65 or over.

== Economy ==
Crawfordsville is the home of the world's first thin-slab casting minimill (steel manufacturing plant that recycles scrap steel using an electric arc-furnace). Nucor Steel broke ground on its first sheet steel mill and first galvanizing line at its billion-dollar Crawfordsville facility in 1987.

R.R. Donnelley & Sons Company started a printing plant in Crawfordsville in 1921 that continues to employ many local residents. The plant name changed to LSC Communications in October 2016 when RR Donnelley & Sons separated into three separate companies. The factory is now called Lakeside Book Company.

== Education ==
Most of the city lies within the Crawfordsville Community Schools school district, while parts of northern Crawfordsville are in North Montgomery Community School Corporation and very small sections of southern Crawfordsville are in South Montgomery Community School Corporation.

=== Universities and colleges ===
- Wabash College
- Ivy Tech Community College of Indiana (Crawfordsville)

== Media ==
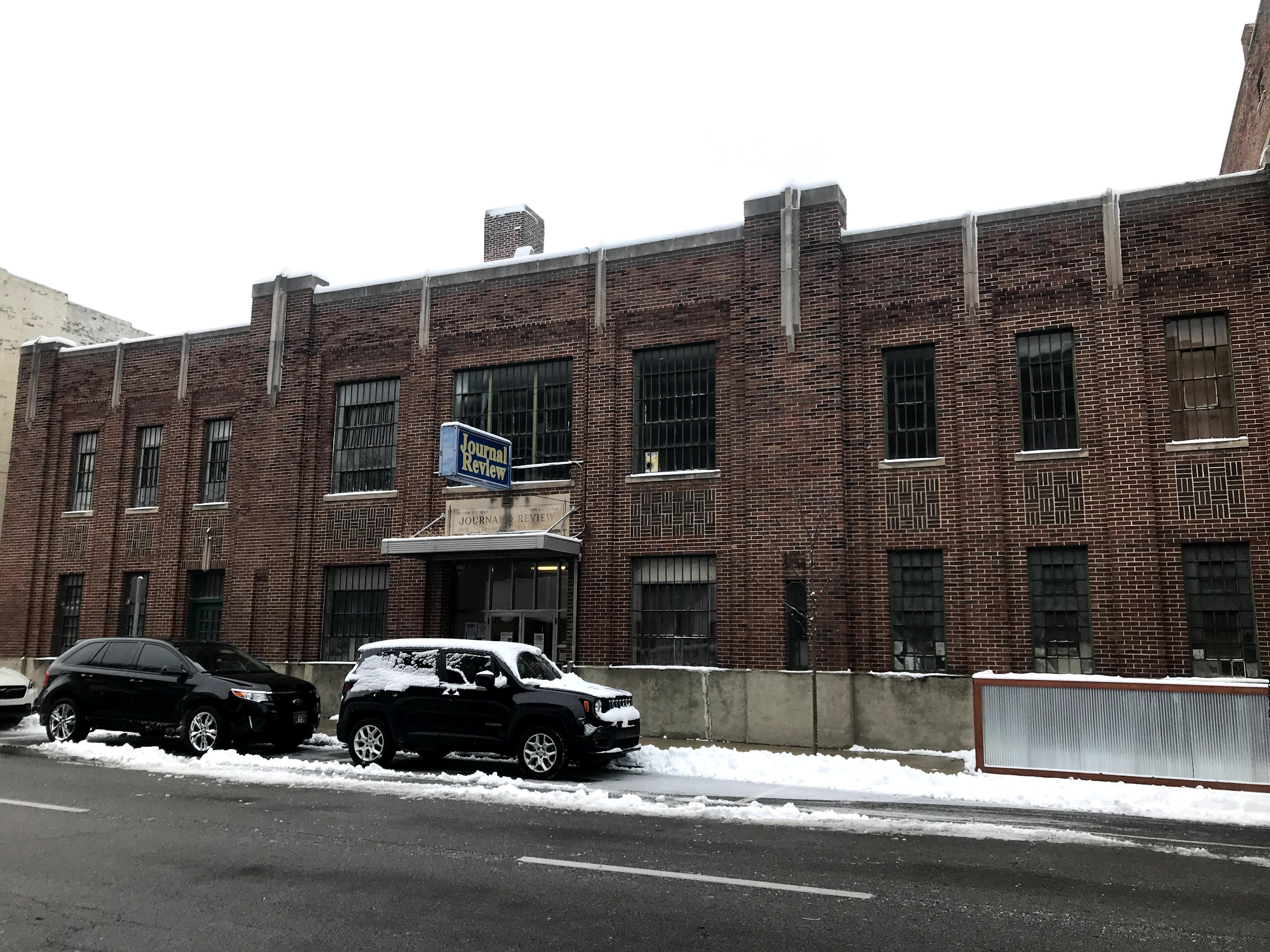
Journal Review main office on North Green Street

Crawfordsville is among the smallest cities in the United States to have two daily newspapers, The Paper and the Journal Review.

== Transportation ==
=== Highways ===
- Interstate 74 to Danville, Illinois and Indianapolis
- U.S. Route 136 Danville, Illinois and Indianapolis
- U.S. Route 231 to Lafayette and Greencastle
- State Road 32 to Perrysville and Lebanon
- State Road 47 to Sheridan and Waveland

=== Rail ===
Until 1967, Crawfordsville was served by passenger trains of the Monon Railroad, which provided service to Chicago, Lafayette, Greencastle, and Bloomington. The Monon merged into the Louisville and Nashville Railroad in 1971.

Currently, Crawfordsville is served by Amtrak's thrice weekly New York–Chicago Cardinal. The Chicago-bound Cardinal stops in Crawfordsville at 7:28 am on Monday, Thursday, and Saturday, while the New York-bound Cardinal stops at 10:30 pm on Tuesday, Thursday, and Saturday.

=== Airport ===
Crawfordsville is served by the Crawfordsville Regional Airport (KCFJ). Located four miles (6.4 km) south of the city, the airport handles approximately 6,383 operations per year, with 100% general aviation and <1% air taxi. The airport has a 5,505-foot (1,678 m) asphalt runway with approved GPS and NDB approaches (Runway 4-22).

== Notable people ==
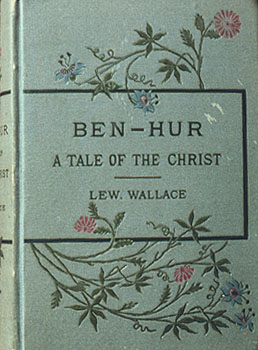
Ben-Hur: A Tale of the Christ by Lew Wallace

- Joseph P. Allen – mission specialist on the first fully operational flight of the Space Shuttle in 1982
- Albert B. Anderson – Judge for U.S. District Court 1902 to 1925 and U.S. Court of Appeals from 1925 to 1938
- Richard Elwell (R.E.) Banta - writer, rare book dealer, publisher and humorist
- "Curly Bill" Brocius – Old West outlaw, evidence stating his birthplace as Crawfordsville is tenuous
- Edward Richard Sprigg Canby – Union general in the American Civil War; attended local Wabash College as a student.
- Henry Beebee Carrington – Union general during the Civil War
- Joseph Stephen Crane – restaurateur of Luau and Kon Tiki restaurants; actor; husband to actresses Lana Turner (1942–1944) and Martine Carol (1948–1953)
- Sidney and Wilbur de Paris – brothers, jazz musicians
- Beatrice Schenk de Regniers – children's books author
- Dick Dietz – professional baseball player
- Leroy Edwards – 1940s University of Kentucky and professional basketball player
- Isaac Compton Elston Sr. – land speculator, banker, patriarch of Crawfordsville's pre-eminent family
- Larry Eyler – Serial killer and abductor
- Dave Gerard – cartoonist created "Will-Yum" and "Citizen Smith", also served as Crawfordsville mayor
- Bayless W. Hanna – Indiana Attorney General (1870–1872), U.S. Minister to Argentina (1885–1889), publisher of the Crawfordsville Review (1883–1885)
- Elizabeth Boynton Harbert – 19th-century American author, lecturer, reformer, and philanthropist, born and grew up in Crawfordsville.
- John Parker Hawkins – lived in Crawfordsville as a boy, career Army officer, became a Union brigadier general during the Civil War
- Bill Holman – cartoonist, creator of Smokey Stover
- Warrior (born James Brian Helwig) (1959–2014) – professional wrestler, best known as Ultimate Warrior
- Kent Kessler – avant-garde jazz bassist
- Caroline Virginia Krout – author
- Mary Hannah Krout – journalist and author
- Eleanor Lambert – head of NYC Fashion Institute, sister of Ward Lambert
- Janet Lambert – author of young adult fiction
- Ward Lambert – Purdue University's basketball coach from 1916 to 1917, 1918–1946, National Basketball League Commissioner, Naismith Basketball Hall of Fame member, brother of Eleanor Lambert
- Henry S. Lane – United States Senator, Governor of Indiana, and pallbearer for Abraham Lincoln
- Stephen A. Love – musician
- Mahlon D. Manson – Union Army brigadier general, Indiana Lieutenant Governor (1885–1886), U.S. Representative (1871–1873), resident of Crawfordsville
- James W. Marshall – gold miner who set off the California Gold Rush.
- Joseph E. McDonald – lawyer, U.S. Representative (1849–1850), U.S. Senator (1875–1881)
- Caleb Mills – author of the free school bill of Indiana, State Superintendent of Public Instruction, first professor at Wabash College
- James Atwell Mount – Governor of Indiana from 1897 to 1901
- Kenyon Nicholson – playwright and screenwriter
- Meredith Nicholson – author (The House of a Thousand Candles, A Hoosier Chronicle), politician, diplomat
- Robert B. F. Peirce – U.S. Representative (1881–83)
- Allen Saunders – cartoonist, wrote Steve Roper, and Mary Worth
- Ferdinand Louis Schlemmer – artist
- Will Shortz – The New York Times puzzle writer
- Lee Orean Smith (1874–1942) – composer, arranger, music editor, publisher, music teacher, multi-instrumentalist, and conductor
- Mason B. Thomas (1866 –1912), phytopathologist and botanist.
- Maurice Thompson – author, poet, naturalist, State Geologist, popularized archery as a sport
- William Wheeler Thornton – author, State Supreme Court librarian, Indiana Deputy Attorney General, Crawfordsville City Attorney
- Randal Turner – opera singer; baritone
- Dick Van Dyke – actor, briefly attended Tuttle Middle School in Crawfordsville
- Lew Wallace – Union general in the Civil War and author of Ben-Hur; Governor of New Mexico Territory from 1878 to 1881; served as U.S. Minister to the Ottoman Empire from 1881 to 1885; resided in Crawfordsville; attended Wabash College.
- Susan Wallace – author and poet, wife of Lew Wallace
- Maurine Dallas Watkins – author of Chicago; Hollywood screenwriter
- Howdy Wilcox – Indianapolis 500 racing pioneer, winner of the 1919 Indy 500
- Mary Holloway Wilhite (1831–1892) – physician and philanthropist
- Henry Lane Wilson – U.S. diplomat and Ambassador to Mexico, son of James Wilson
- Jacob Wilson – racing driver
- James Wilson – politician, United States Representative from Indiana and United States Ambassador to Venezuela
- John L. Wilson – politician, United States Representative and Senator from Washington, son of James Wilson
