= Saint John's Episcopal Church (Crawfordsville, Indiana) =

Historic church in Indiana, United States

- U.S. National Register of Historic Places
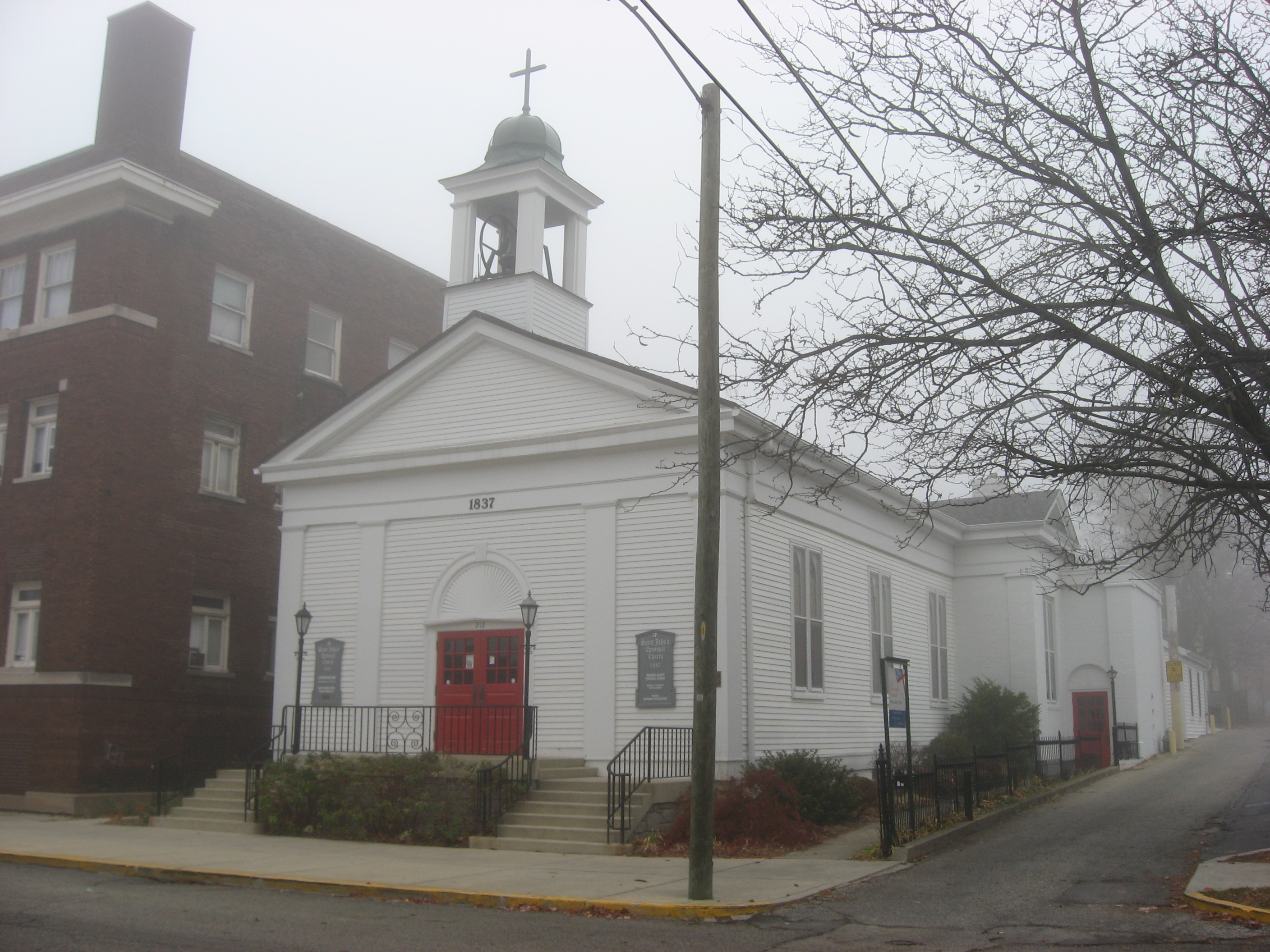
- St. John's Episcopal Church, November 2010

- Location within Indiana Location within the United States
- Location: 212 S. Green St., Crawfordsville, Indiana
- Coordinates: 40°2′25″N 86°53′58″W
- Area: less than one acre
- Built: 1837
- Architect: Garrison, John E.; Peck & Hayden
- Architectural style: Greek Revival
- NRHP reference No.: 85000598
- Added to NRHP: March 21, 1985

Saint John's Episcopal Church is a historic Episcopal church located at Crawfordsville, Indiana. It was built in 1837 by an Episcopal congregation, organized through missionary bishop Jackson Kemper, and is a one-story, gable fronted frame building in the Greek Revival style. The original section measures 30 feet by 50 feet; a 30-foot rear addition was built in 1960. Atop the roof is a belfry added about 1950. It is the oldest remaining church building in Crawfordsville and Indiana's first Episcopal Church building.

The church reported 135 members in 2015 and 109 members in 2023; no membership statistics were reported in 2024 parochial reports. Plate and pledge income reported for the congregation in 2024 was $196,234. Average Sunday attendance (ASA) in 2024 was 54 persons.

The building was listed on the National Register of Historic Places in 1985.

Theologian Hans Frei, a longtime Yale Divinity School faculty member and a significant figure in Post-liberal theology, briefly served as rector in the early 1950s.
