= Elston Grove Historic District (Crawfordsville, Indiana) =

Historic district in Indiana, United States

- U.S. National Register of Historic Places
- U.S. Historic district
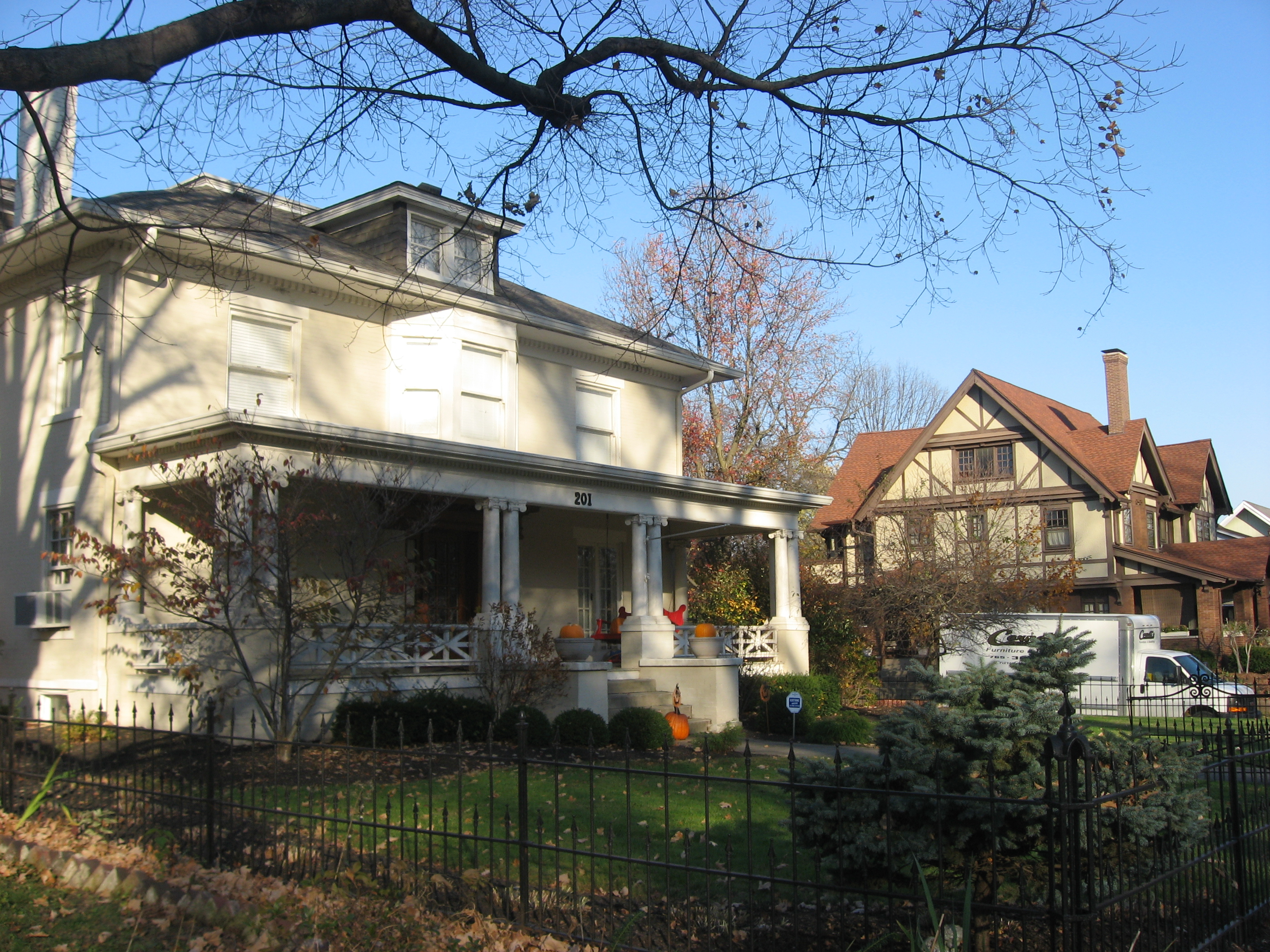
- Elston Grove Historic District, November 2009

- Location within Indiana Location within the United States
- Location: Roughly bounded by Green, College and Main Sts. and the Monon RR tracks, Crawfordsville, Indiana
- Coordinates: 40°2′24″N 86°53′43″W
- Area: 36 acres (15 ha)
- Built: 1835
- Architect: Thurtle, John; Griffith, Thornton
- Architectural style: Colonial Revival, Italianate, Queen Anne
- NRHP reference No.: 92000187
- Added to NRHP: March 25, 1992

Elston Grove Historic District is a national historic district located at Crawfordsville, Indiana. The district encompasses 138 contributing buildings and eight contributing structures in a predominantly residential section of Crawfordsville. It developed between about 1835 and 1935, and includes notable examples of Italianate, Queen Anne, and Colonial Revival style architecture. Located in the district are the separately listed Col. Isaac C. Elston House, Henry S. Lane House, and Gen. Lew Wallace Study. Other notable buildings include the Galey House (1848), Campbell House (1852), T.S. Scott House (c. 1855), Powers House (1862), Blair House (c. 1863), Hadley and Hornaday Houses (1878), Alfrey House (1885), Detchon House (c. 1895), Ashley House (c. 1890), Snyder House (c. 1903), and Voris House (c. 1920).

It was listed on the National Register of Historic Places in 1992.
