= Normal Hall (Ladoga, Indiana) =

Historic school building in Indiana, United States

- U.S. National Register of Historic Places
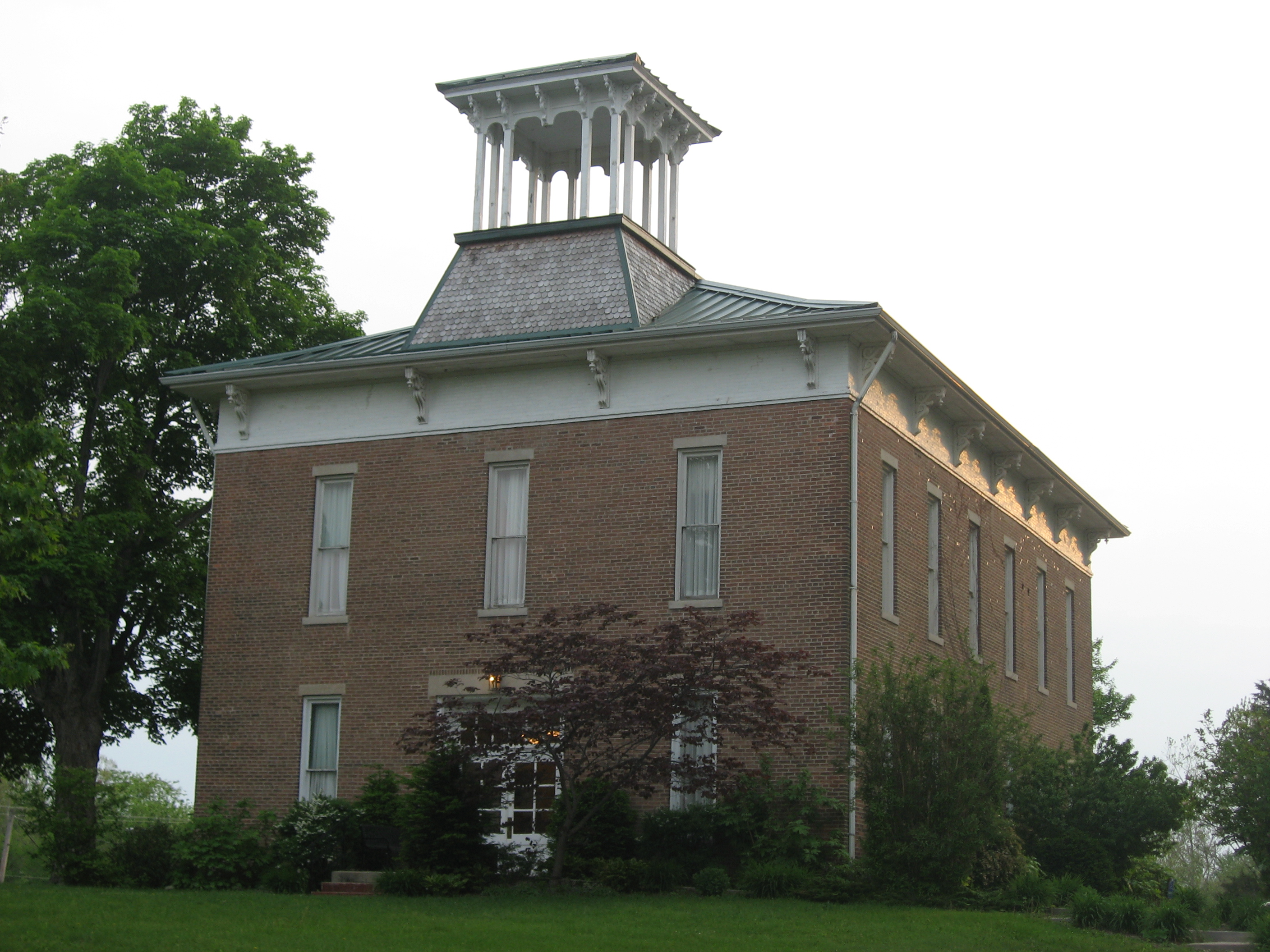
- Normal Hall, May 2011

- Location within Indiana Location within the United States
- Location: Jct. of W. Main and Harrison Sts., NW corner, Ladoga, Indiana
- Coordinates: 39°54′50″N 86°48′15″W
- Area: 1.7 acres (0.69 ha)
- Built: 1878, 1907
- Architect: Huntington, Hiram
- Architectural style: Italianate, Greek Revival
- NRHP reference No.: 95001533
- Added to NRHP: January 11, 1996

Normal Hall, also known as Ladoga Normal School, Ladoga High School, and American Legion Post #324, is a historic school building located at Ladoga, Indiana. It was built in 1878, and is a two-story, three bay by six bay, Greek Revival / Italianate style brick building. It has a hipped roof topped by an open cupola, originally a bell tower added in 1907. It is the only remaining building associated with the Central Indiana Normal School, which relocated in 1878 to Danville, Indiana to become Canterbury College. It housed local schools until 1917, then housed an armory, and an American Legion post after 1944.

It was listed on the National Register of Historic Places in 1996.
