= Montgomery County Jail and Sheriff's Residence =

Historic government buildings in Indiana, United States

- U.S. National Register of Historic Places
- U.S. National Historic Landmark
- U.S. Historic district – Contributing property
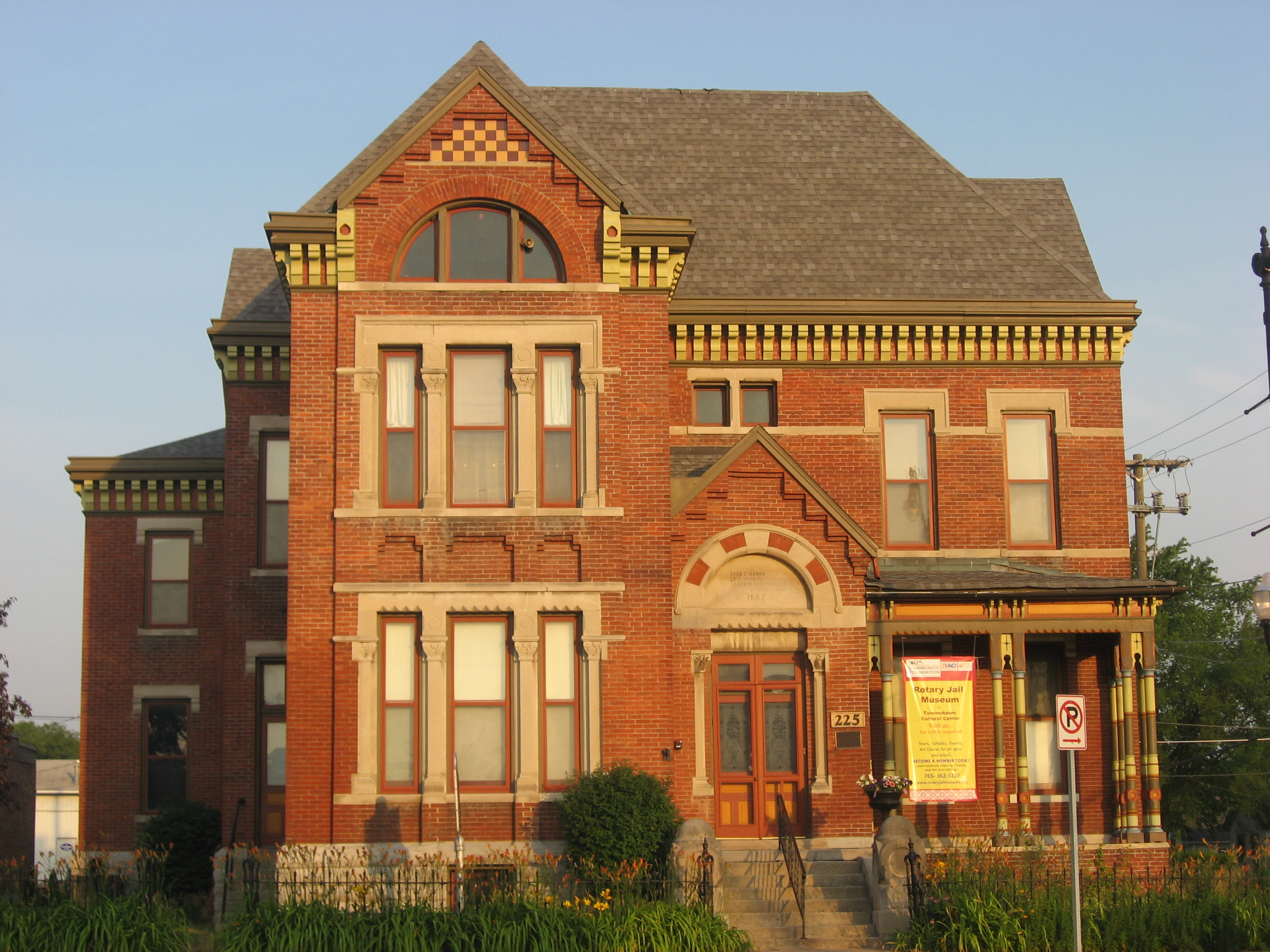
- Montgomery County Jail and Sheriff's Residence, June 2012

- Location within Indiana Location within the United States
- Location: 225 N. Washington St., Crawfordsville, Indiana
- Coordinates: 40°2′38″N 86°54′6″W
- Area: less than one acre
- Built: 1882
- Architect: Hodgson, E.J.; Hinkley, Julian W. & Norris, James
- Architectural style: Italianate, Gothic, Romanesque
- Part of: Crawfordsville Commercial Historic District (ID92000183)
- NRHP reference No.: 75000007

Significant dates
- Added to NRHP: May 1, 1975
- Designated NHL: December 11, 2023
- Designated CP: March 25, 1992

Montgomery County Jail and Sheriff's Residence is a historic jail and sheriff's residence located at Crawfordsville, Indiana. It was built in 1882 in two sections, and is a 2 1/2-story, red brick and limestone building in a combination of Italianate, Gothic Revival, and Romanesque Revival style architecture. The jail is a rotary jail; it is the only example of this type in Indiana and one of two left in the United States. The building houses a local history and prison museum.

It was listed on the National Register of Historic Places in 1975, and was designated a National Historic Landmark in 2023. It is located in the Crawfordsville Commercial Historic District.

== See also ==
- List of museums in Indiana
- List of National Historic Landmarks in Indiana
- National Register of Historic Places listings in Montgomery County, Indiana
