= Carnegie Museum of Montgomery County =

Museum in Crawfordsville, Indiana, US

Coordinates: 40.0396°N 86.9011°W

- Established: 2007
- Location: 222 S. Washington Street, Crawfordsville, Indiana, United States
- Type: History, science, art, and culture

The Carnegie Museum of Montgomery County (CMMC) is located in Crawfordsville, Indiana, United States. The museum, opened in June 2007, is located in the first Carnegie Library building in Indiana, which opened in 1902. The museum's exhibits focus on the history, art, and culture of Montgomery County. Themes include business and industry, literature and learning, arts and culture, military and democracy, sports and pop culture, topics about Montgomery County, early history, and STEM/STEAM-based programs.

The mission of the CMMC is to promote public awareness and appreciation of the history, heritage, and culture of Montgomery County through educational programs, public services, collection, exhibition, preservation, and research and documentation.

== History ==
In order for a community to receive $25,000 from industrialist and philanthropist Andrew Carnegie for a library, they had to meet a specific criteria, known as "The Carnegie Formula":

1. Demonstrate the need for a public library.
2. The community must provide a building site.
3. Annually provide 10% of the cost of the library's construction to support its operation.

On January 22, 1901, W. F. Hulet, the secretary of the Commercial Club, a local community organization, sent a letter to Andrew Carnegie asking him to help create a new library because the Crawfordsville City Library had become too small to satisfy the needs of the growing community. Carnegie agreed to help under the stipulation that the site be within a few blocks of the town square. The community gathered at Louis Bischof's Big Store to discuss and vote on a suitable location. They decided on a plot at the corner of Wabash Avenue and Washington Street. The community also supported the annual 10% investment of $2,500 to care for the library's collection and staff.

The Crawfordsville District Public Library (CDPL) relocated to a new building in 2005 and is across the street from the original Carnegie building. CDPL decided to continue to care for their former site and to create a community-based museum, the Carnegie Museum of Montgomery County.

More information about the library building is featured in Mary Johnson's The History of Libraries in Montgomery County.
