= Col. Isaac C. Elston House =

Historic house in Indiana, United States

- U.S. National Register of Historic Places
- U.S. Historic district – Contributing property
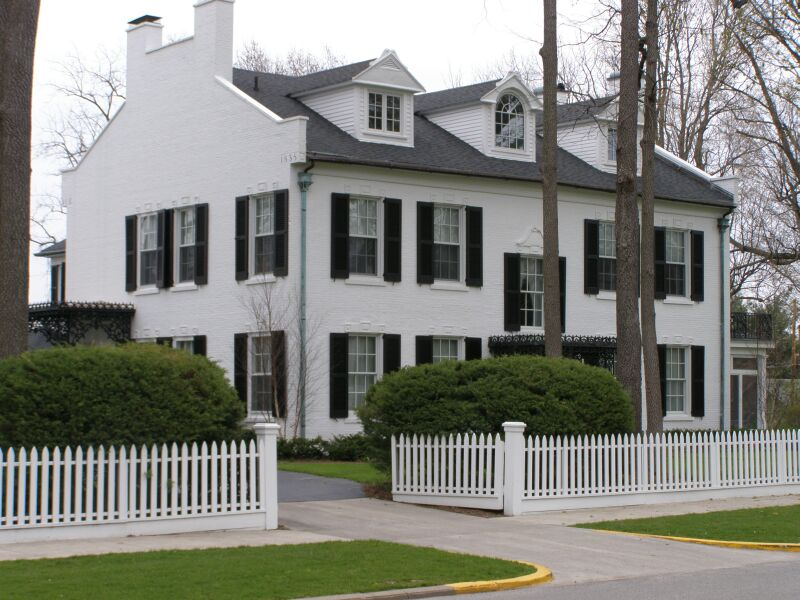
- Elston House

- Location within Indiana Location within the United States
- Location: 400 E. Pike St., Crawfordsville, Indiana
- Coordinates: 40°2′26″N 86°53′40″W
- Area: 1.4 acres (0.57 ha)
- Built: 1882
- Architectural style: Stick/Eastlake, Eastern Stick
- NRHP reference No.: 82000025
- Added to NRHP: April 15, 1982

The Col. Isaac C. Elston House, also known as Elston Homestead, is a historic home located at Crawfordsville, Indiana, United States. It was the home of Maj. Isaac Compton Elston, who fought in the War of 1812 and the Black Hawk War. When he was 39, he moved to Indiana and became a frontier merchant, banker and financier. His house was given to Wabash College by his grandson, Isaac Compton Elston Jr. (1873–1964) and is now used as the President's home.

It was listed on the National Register of Historic Places in 1982. It is located in the Elston Grove Historic District.
