= McClelland-Layne House =

Historic house in Indiana, United States

- U.S. National Register of Historic Places
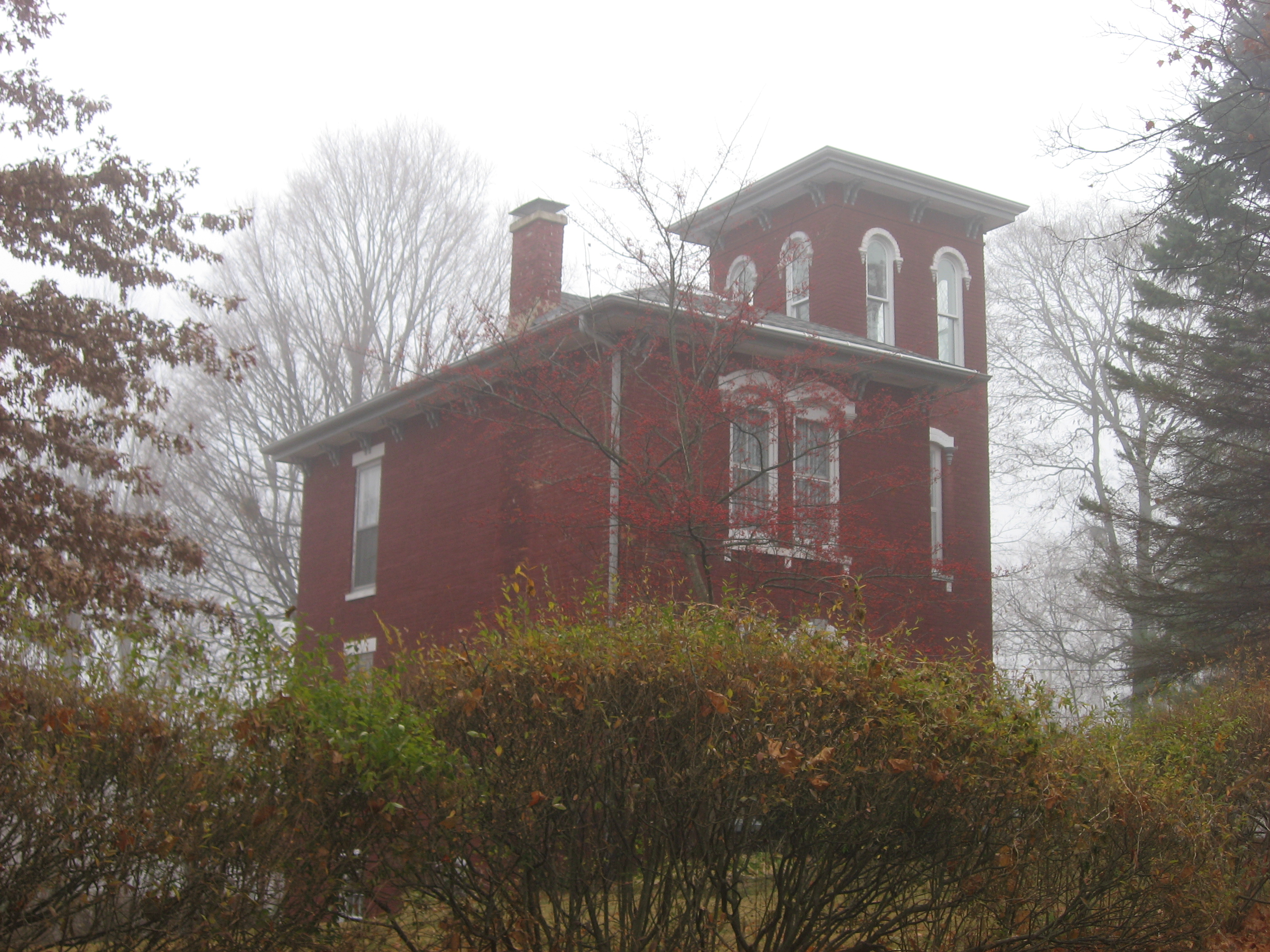
- McClelland-Layne House, November 2010

- Location within Indiana Location within the United States
- Location: 602 Cherry St., Crawfordsville, Indiana
- Coordinates: 40°2′41″N 86°54′33″W
- Area: 0.4 acres (0.16 ha)
- Built: 1869
- Architectural style: Italian Villa
- NRHP reference No.: 85002135
- Added to NRHP: September 12, 1985

McClelland-Layne House is a historic home located at Crawfordsville, Indiana. It was built in 1869, and is a two-story, L-shaped, Italian Villa style brick dwelling. It has a low-hipped roof and segmental- and round-arched windows. The house features a three-story tower topped by a low-hipped roof. It was built for well known Crawfordsville surgeon Dr. James S. McClelland.

It was listed on the National Register of Historic Places in 1985.
