= Mary Holloway Wilhite =

American physician, philanthropist, suffragist, women's rights activist, writer

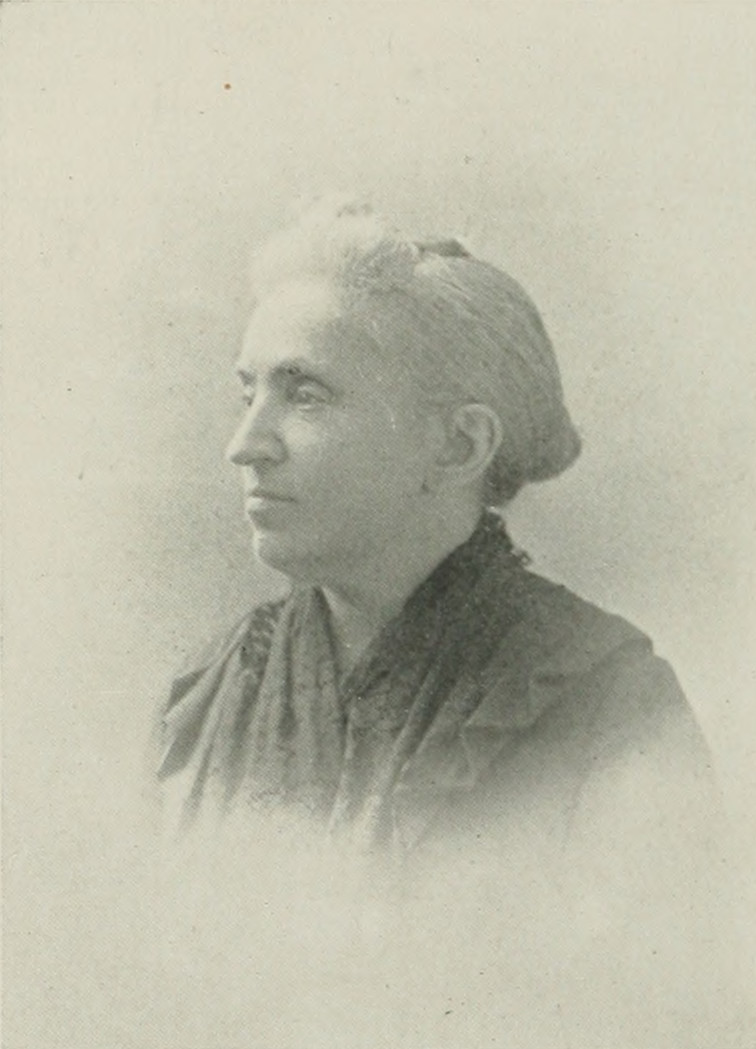
- Photo in A Woman of the Century
- Born: Mary Mitchell Holloway; February 3, 1831 near Crawfordsville, Indiana, U.S.
- Died: February 8, 1892 (aged 61); Crawfordsville, Indiana
- Education: Woman's Medical College of Pennsylvania
- Occupations: physician; philanthropist; writer
- Spouse: Eleazer Allen Wilhite (m. 1861)

Mary Holloway Wilhite (née, Holloway; February 3, 1831 – February 8, 1892) was a 19th-century American physician and philanthropist. She was the first female medical graduate from Indiana, as well as the first female practitioner in the state. Wilhite made several important discoveries regarding the effects of medical pharmaceuticals in certain diseases. Her greatest success was in the treatment of women and children. A woman's suffrage and women's rights leader, she was also the founder of the Montgomery County, Indiana Orphans' home. Wilhite contributed regularly to the local newspapers.

== Early life and education ==
Mary Mitchell Holloway was born near Crawfordsville, Indiana, February 3, 1831. Her father, Washington Holloway, a cabinet-maker, was a native of Kentucky and a Crawfordsville pioneer. He served as Sergeant-at-arms of the Indiana House of Representatives. Her mother was Elizabeth King, of Virginia.

At the age of fifteen, Wilhite was confirmed in the Christian church. When she was seventeen, her mother died. Wilhite was an advocate of woman's rights, even in childhood. In 1850, still a teenager she sold subscriptions for the first woman's rights paper published in the United States, the Woman's Advocate, edited by Anne Elizabeth McDowell, in Philadelphia.

Wishing to be self-supporting, she engaged in school-teaching and sewing. With her savings and assistance from a financial aid fund, she entered the Woman's Medical College of Pennsylvania, Philadelphia, in 1854. She graduated in 1856 with the thesis “Constituents of Organic Bodies". She was the first Indiana woman to be graduated from a medical college.

== Career ==
Wilhite was also the first woman in Indiana, as a graduate, to engage in the practice of medicine. Returning to Crawfordsville, she opened an office. On account of her sex, she was not allowed membership in medical associations, but she gained popularity nonetheless. She made several important discoveries regarding the effects of medicine in certain diseases. Her greatest success was in the treatment of women and children.

Wilhite was a philanthropist. She was especially interested in the welfare of young girls, and helped many of them to obtain employment. She was unceasing in her opposition against the use of whisky and tobacco. When employed as physician to the county almshouse, she was unhappy with the condition of the children associated with the class of adult paupers, and she worked with the help of others to establish the county children's home. In 1869, she arranged for a convention, in which Mary Livermore, Elizabeth Cady Stanton and Susan B. Anthony were speakers. Subsequently, she was a leader in arranging meetings in the cause of the advancement of women.

In 1869, she co-organized the Woman's Suffrage Association of Montgomery County, Indiana, and also served as secretary. She was the vice-president of the Indiana Equal Suffrage Association, organizing the association's convention of 1880 in Crawfordsville. Wilhite contributed regularly to the local newspapers on the subject of suffrage, and other topics which interested her. Her poetic nature found expression in verse, and she wrote many short poems.

== Personal life ==
In December 1860, she married Eleazer Allen Wilhite (1820–1909), of Crawfordsville. Three of their children died in infancy. She died at her home in Crawfordsville, February 8, 1892, from congestion of the lungs, after contracting pneumonia during a house call with a patient. Her husband, two sons, and two daughters survived her. Her son Stanton was named after Elizabeth Cady Stanton.

== Legacy ==
Wilhite is remembered as a leading figure in the Indiana suffragette movement as a woman physician, with a historical marker erected in Crawfordsville, Indiana detailing her achievements and impact. She was honored in 2020 in a virtual celebration of the 100th anniversary of the adoption of the 19th amendment, both for her work as a suffragette and contributions to local philanthropy efforts.
