= Bethel AME Church of Crawfordsville =

Historic church in Indiana, United States

- U.S. National Register of Historic Places
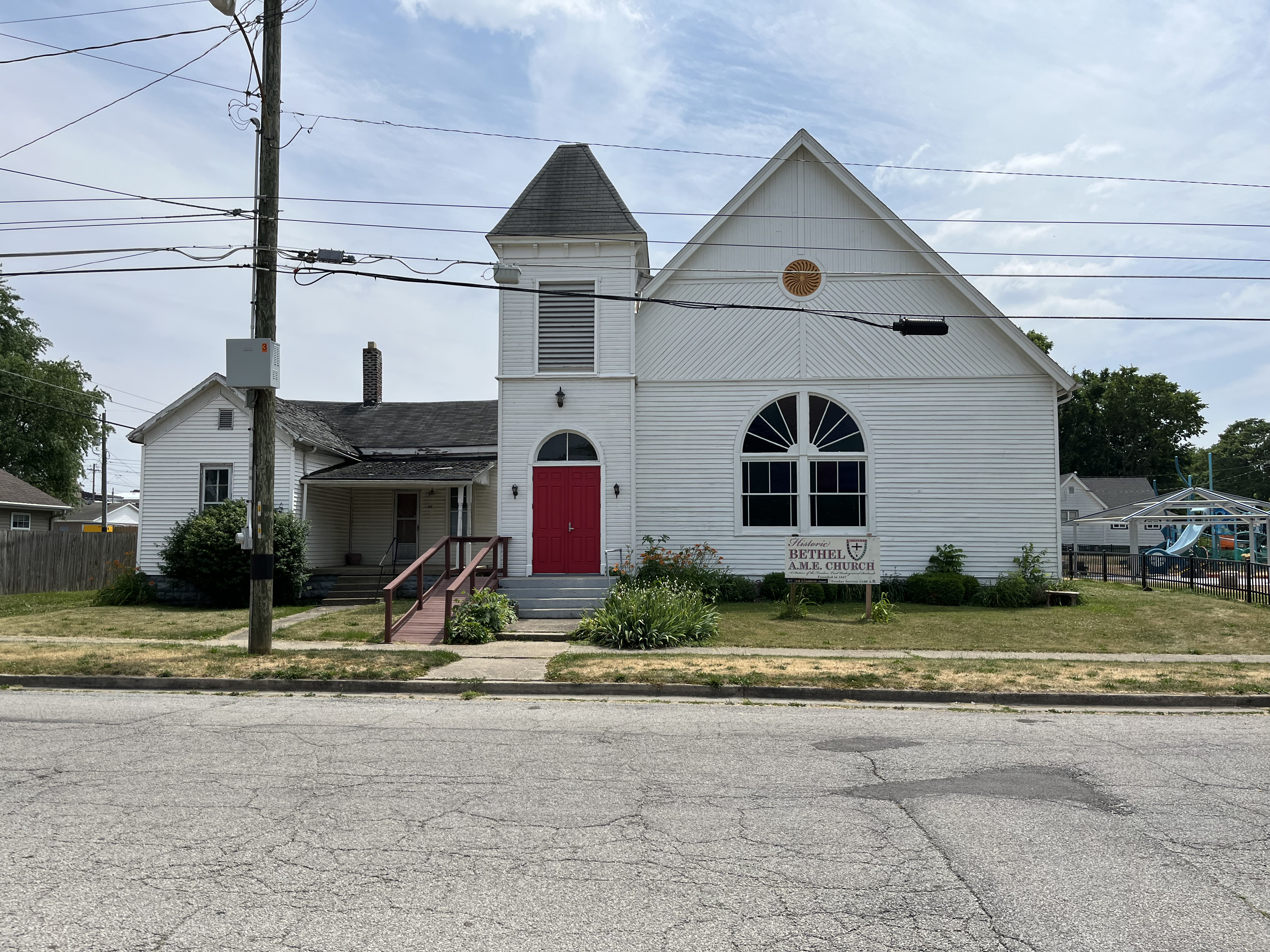
- Bethel AME Church of Crawfordsville, June 2023

- Location within Indiana Location within the United States
- Location: 213 W. North St., Crawfordsville, Indiana
- Coordinates: 40°2′41″N 86°54′14″W
- Area: less than one acre
- Built: 1892, 1900
- Architectural style: Queen Anne
- NRHP reference No.: 01000990
- Added to NRHP: September 16, 2001

Bethel AME Church of Crawfordsville is a historic African Methodist Episcopal church located at Crawfordsville, Montgomery County, Indiana. It was built in 1892, and is a one-story, gable fronted frame building on a brick foundation. It features a large round-arched window and two-story, square corner tower. Portions of the building are believed to date to 1847. Also on the property is a contributing one-story, Queen Anne style cottage that served as the original parsonage.

It was listed on the National Register of Historic Places in 2001.

== Early Church (1830s-1892) ==
Black Settlement began in Crawfordsville around the early 1800s. Notable early Black settlers include the Gates (1832) and Jones families.

African American settlers in Indiana were commonly denied positions in church congregations, the result being both informal and formal segregation of religious facilities. The African Methodist Episcopal Church (AME), founded in response to religious exclusion, appealed to many Black communities in Indiana. The AME Indiana Conference's 1840–45 minutes record twenty members in Crawfordsville AME.

Crawfordsville AME constructed their first official church before the winter of 1847. The dimensions of this first church were thirty by twenty-six feet. The trustees were Nelson Patterson, Robert Jones, and Jacob Cousin. Nelson Patterson was the first lay AME preacher. This original building is recorded in an 1878 map of Crawfordsville. In 1860, the congregation built a parsonage on the edge of lot 20 for the pastor and his family.

The early congregation was involved alongside known abolitionist John Allen Speed in the Underground Railroad in Indiana. Crawfordsville was a known stop on the way north, following a route through Greencastle and then northward toward the Wabash River. Bethel AME aided Speed, their neighbor at the time, hiding fugitive slaves in their basement.

During the Civil War, five members of Bethel AME served in the U.S. Colored Infantry, including Nelson Patterson, Austen Carpenter, Issac Jones, Harvey Smith, Monroe Vick, and Charles Wickliffe.

Church records and city directories confirm that school was held in the church at least into the 1880, only discontinuing due to severe overcrowding. Two Lincoln Schools, built in 1882 and 1924 respectively, took over the role of education.

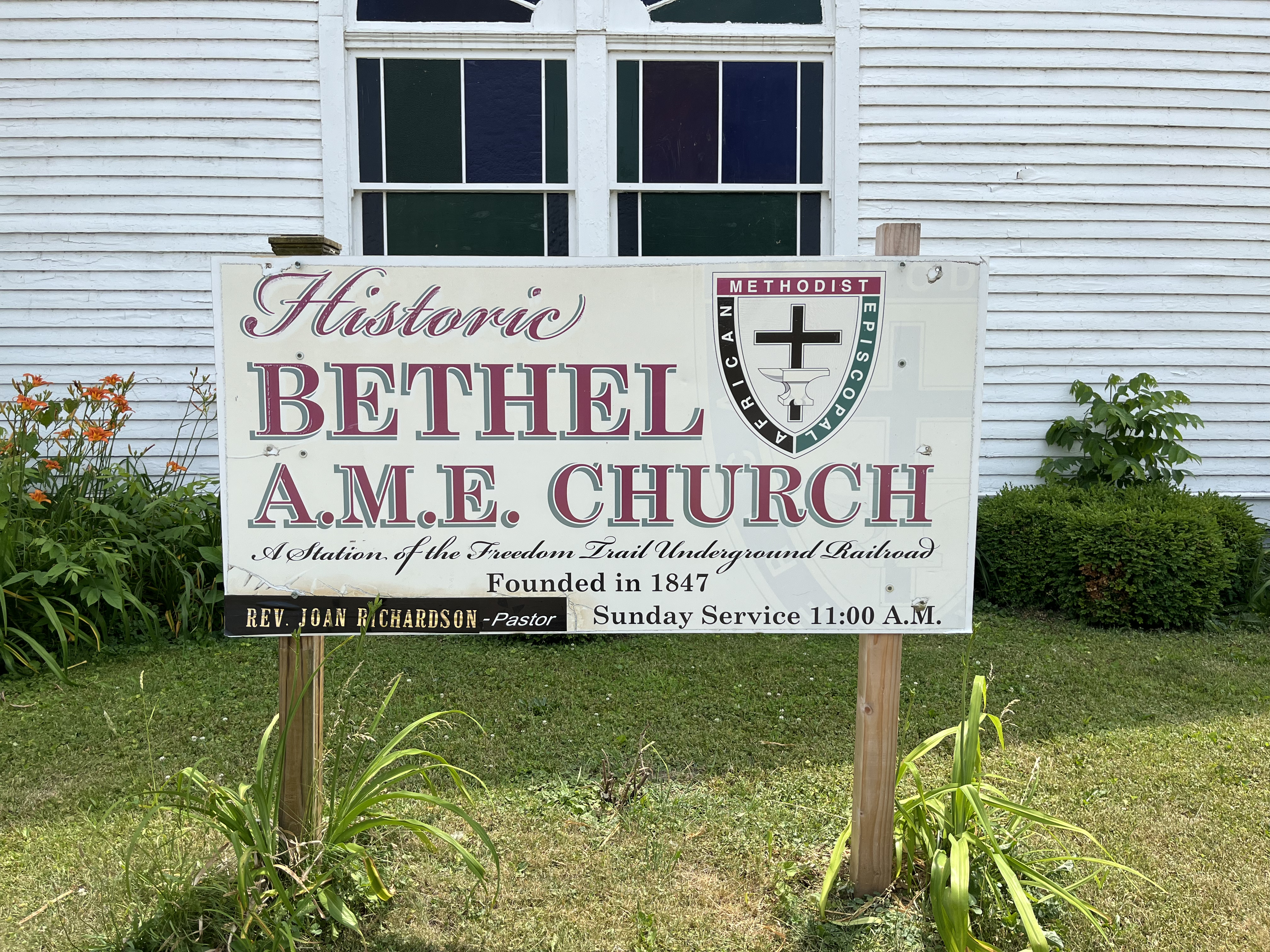
Historic Bethel AME sign. Placed outside the church.

== Modern Church (1892-Present) ==
The modern structure, constructed in 1892, incorporates structures from the original church. An obituary from 1901 cites Ephraim C. Griffith as the builder. Griffith was also involved in the construction of Crawfordsville's 1876 courthouse, Elston Bank, and First Methodist Church. Griffith was also listed on the 1881 Church school board. Reverend Lewis Pettiford was assigned to Crawfordsville AME in 1893, building and donating thirty oak pews which are skill in use today.

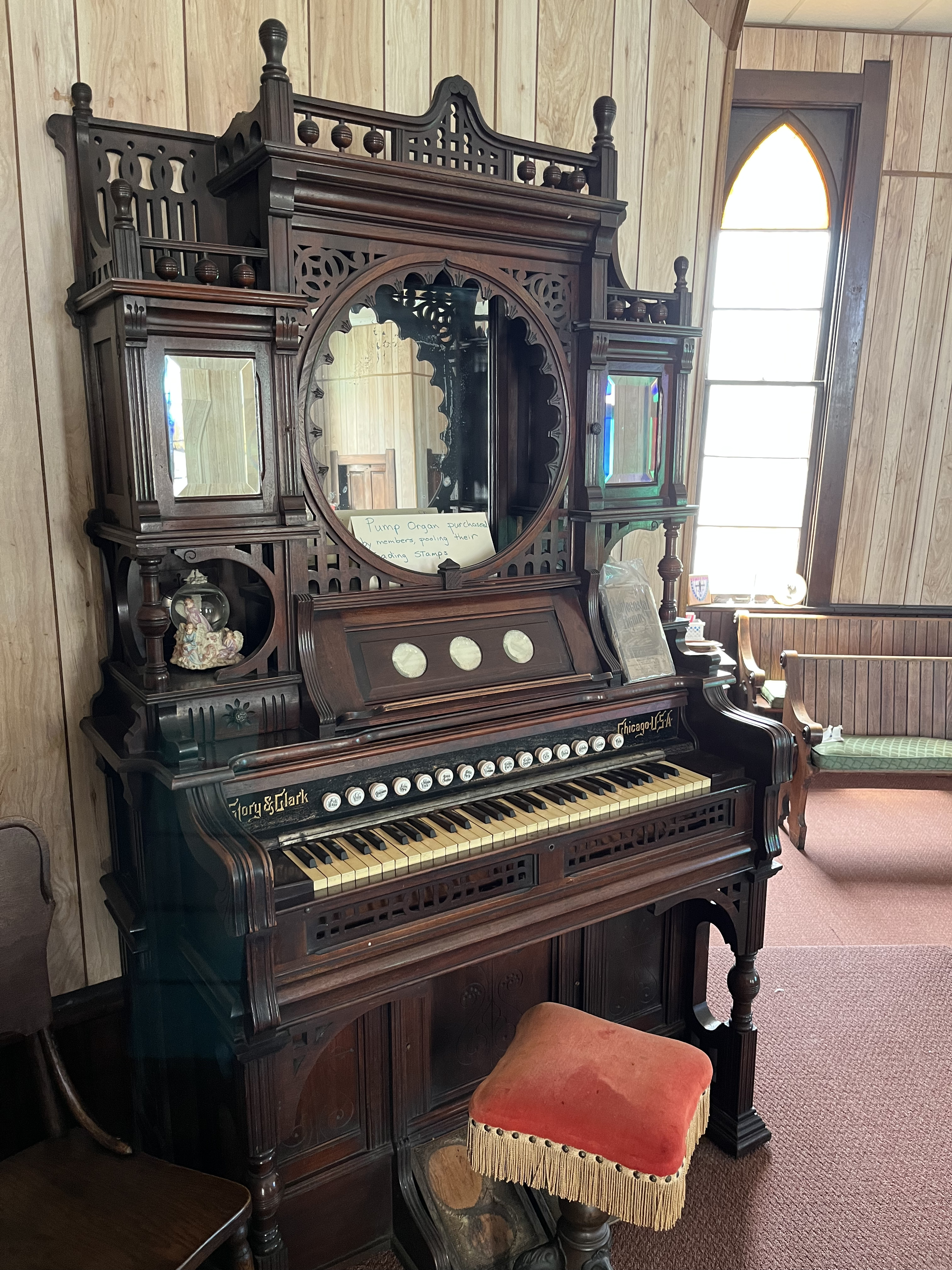
1906 Organ, restored in 2018

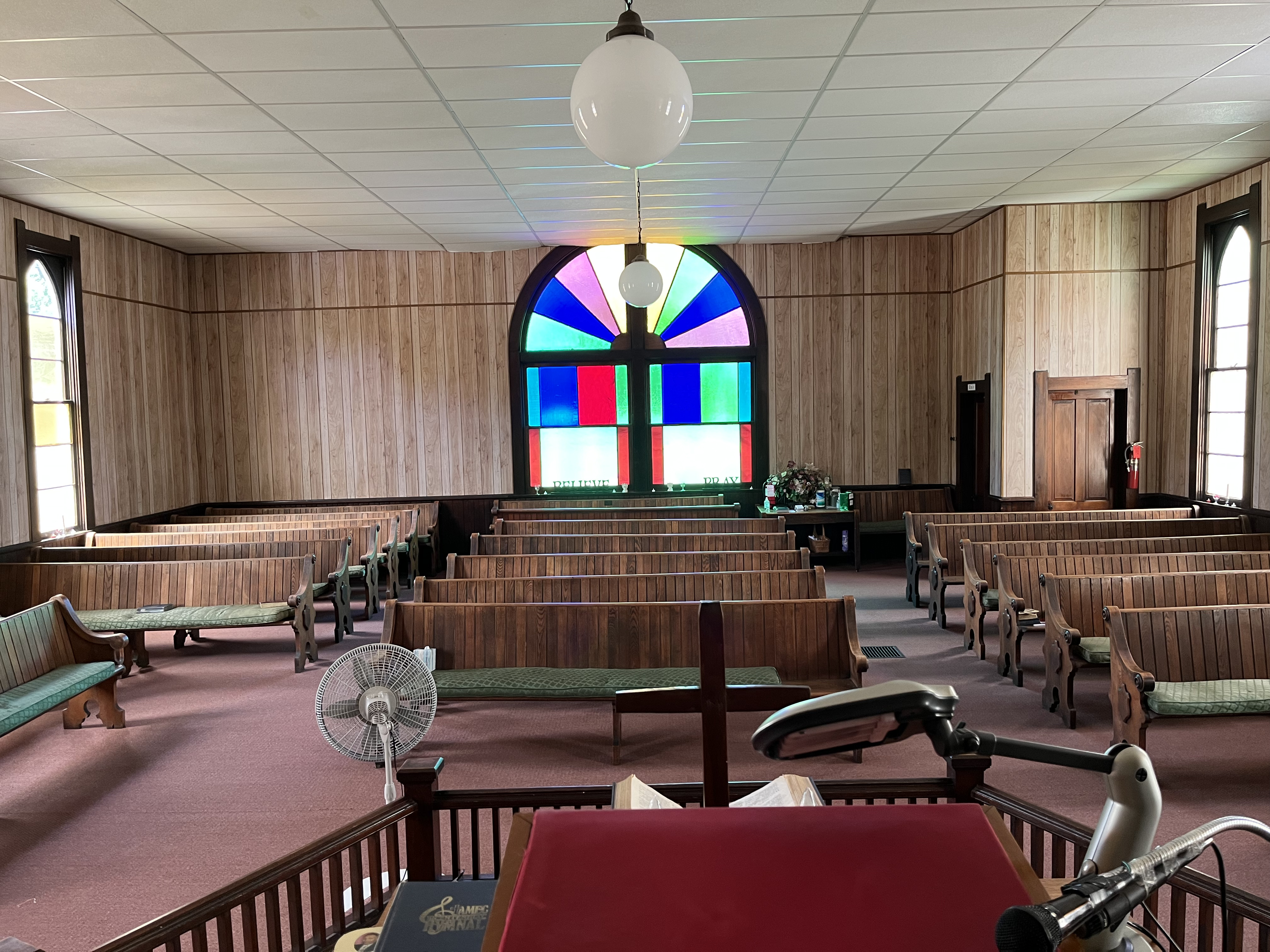
Sanctuary of Bethel AME Crawfordsville

In 1906, Bethel AME obtained their organ in 1906, using S&H Green Stamps to make the purchase. The organ was repaired in 2018 with proceeds from the book Abolitions of the Underground Railroad: Legends from Montgomery County, Indiana (A local history written by Shannon Hudson). Crawfordsville AME adopted the name 'Bethel' in 1910.

During the 1920s, Miss Blanche Patterson (1884–1965), longtime member of Bethel AME, became the first Black woman in Montgomery County to attend college.

In 1923 Bethel AME hosted the State Convention of Colored Masonic Lodges. AME's feature on the front page of the Journal and Review newspaper attracted attention from the local chapter of the Ku Klux Klan who began harassing the congregation. According to church legend, the congregation drowned out the sounds of harassment with louder singing.

The passage of Civil Rights Act of 1964 and following legislation resulted in a decline in church membership. Many chose to worship in larger cities due to now desegregated facilities.

Bethel AME Crawfordsville operates as of 2023 under Reverend Joan Richardson. Service takes place on Sunday at 11:00 AM.
