= Crawfordsville Commercial Historic District =

Historic district in Indiana, United States

- U.S. National Register of Historic Places
- U.S. Historic district
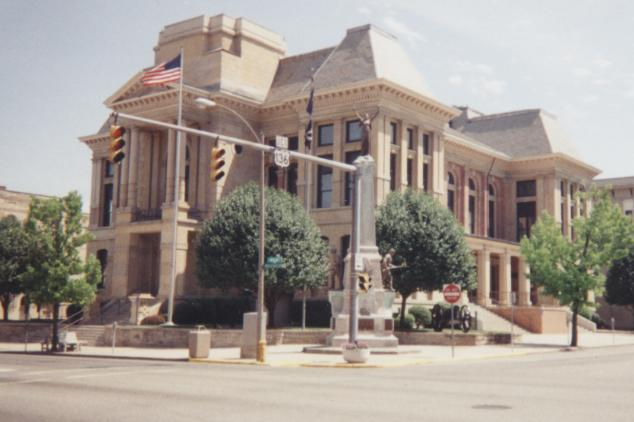
- Montgomery County Courthouse, 1997

- Location within Indiana Location within the United States
- Location: Roughly bounded by Walnut, North and Water Sts. and Wabash Ave., Crawfordsville, Indiana
- Coordinates: 40°2′32″N 86°55′59″W
- Area: 60 acres (24 ha)
- Architect: Besson, Carroll O.; Sharpe, William F.
- Architectural style: Classical Revival, Bungalow/craftsman, Italianate
- NRHP reference No.: 92000183
- Added to NRHP: March 25, 1992

Crawfordsville Commercial Historic District is a national historic district located at Crawfordsville, Indiana. The district encompasses 105 contributing buildings, one contributing structure, and one contributing object in the central business district of Crawfordsville. It developed between about 1836 and 1940, and includes notable examples of Italianate, Classical Revival, and Bungalow/American Craftsman style architecture. Located in the district are the separately listed Montgomery County Jail and Sheriff's Residence and Otto Schlemmer Building. Other notable buildings are the Montgomery County Courthouse (1876), Ben Hur Life Building (1911), Hanna-Graham Building, Elston Bank Building (1869), Masonic Temple (1902), Carnegie Library (1902), Commerce Building (1907), Municipal Building (1933), Indiana National Guard Armory (1939), and U.S. Post Office (1940).

It was listed on the National Register of Historic Places in 1992.
