= Otto Schlemmer Building =

- U.S. National Register of Historic Places
- U.S. Historic district – Contributing property
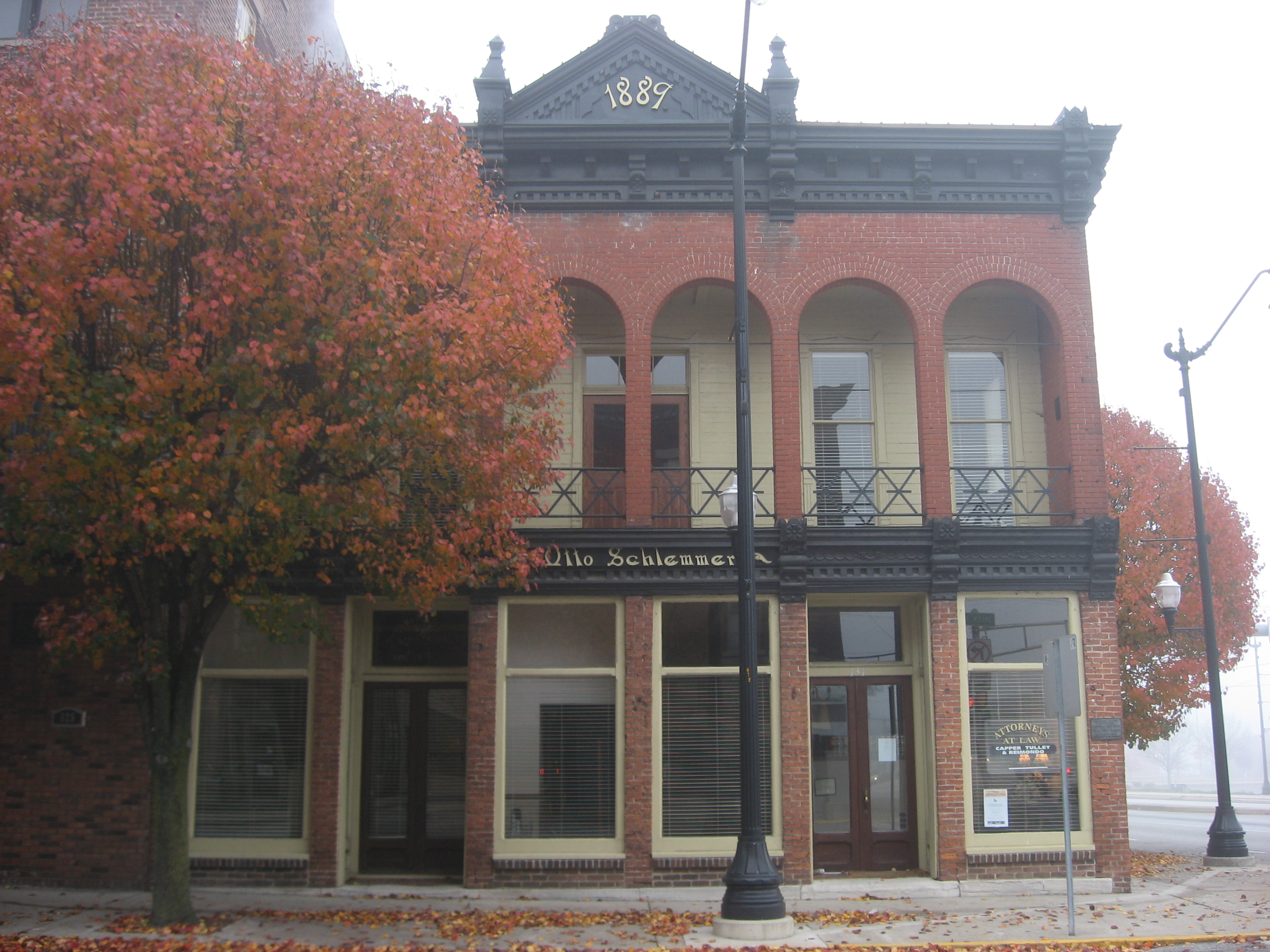
- Otto Schlemmer Building, November 2010

- Location within Indiana Location within the United States
- Location: 129-131 N. Green St., Crawfordsville, Indiana
- Coordinates: 40°2′34″N 86°54′0″W
- Area: less than one acre
- Built: 1854
- Architectural style: Renaissance
- NRHP reference No.: 78000026
- Added to NRHP: November 28, 1978

Otto Schlemmer Building is a historic commercial building located at Crawfordsville, Indiana. It was originally built in 1854, and renovated to its present form in 1889. It is a two-story brick building with wood and pressed metal trim. The front facade features an arcade of six two-story, round-headed brick arches that form a gallery at the second level. The use of the Roman arch, denticulated frieze, bracketing, and a projecting central pediment are reflective of the Victorian Renaissance style.

It was listed on the National Register of Historic Places in 1985. It is located in the Crawfordsville Commercial Historic District.

Current Use and Ownership

The Otto Schlemmer Building is now owned by Capper Tulley and Reimondo Attorneys at law and has been since the late 1970s. The Building is used as a law office and occupied by highly educated and respected lawyers in Crawfordsville. The current partners of Capper Tulley and Reimondo are John S. Capper and Robert N. Reimondo. The official website is http://capperlaw.info/.
