= Indiana Office of Community & Rural Affairs =

State government agency in Indiana

Coordinates: 39°46′3.2″N 86°9′40.9″W

The Indiana Office of Community and Rural Affairs (OCRA) is a governmental agency of the U.S. state of Indiana charged to work with local, state, and national partners providing resources and technical assistance that assist rural communities in shaping their visions for community economic development. Lt. Governor Sue Ellspermann oversaw the office that was created by legislation in 2005, making rural Indiana a major focus for the first time. Currently, Lt. Governor Crouch oversees the office that is run by OCRA Executive Director Jodi Golden.

== Programs ==
OCRA oversees an array of different community focused programs and grants, which include the following: Blight Clearance Program (BCP), Community Development Block Grants (CDBG), Community Readiness Initiative (CRI), Disaster Recovery, Downtown Enhancement Grant (DEG), Historic Renovation Grant Program (HRGP), Hometown Collaboration Grant (HCI), Indiana Main Street, Indiana Site Certified, Joint Land Use Study (JLUS), Main Street Revitalization Program (MSRP), Place Based Investment Fund (PBIF), Planning Grant, Public Facilities Program (PFP), Quick Impact Placebased Grant (QuIP), Stellar Communities, Stormwater Improvements Program, Wastewater and Drinking Water Program (WDW), Workforce Development Program (WDP).

== Stellar Communities ==
The Stellar Communities program is a multi-agency partnership designed to fund comprehensive community development projects in Indiana's smaller communities. The Indiana Office of Community and Rural Affairs (OCRA), the Indiana Housing & Community Development Authority (IHCDA), and the Indiana Department of Transportation (INDOT), along with the State Revolving Fund, are participating in this program. The program seeks to leverage state and federal funding from multiple agencies to undertake large-scale projects in rural communities.

Only cities with a population of 50,000 or fewer were welcome to apply, and somewhere between 46 and 48 cities submitted initial applications. 12 finalists were selected to submit proposals and the first winners of grant funding are the communities of Greencastle and North Vernon.

DePauw University played an integral part in the grant application for Greencastle by providing matching funds for some of the proposal's initiatives.

Since the inception of the Stellar Communities program, anywhere from 2 to 4 communities have been designated each year.
