= Henry S. Lane House =

Historic house in Indiana, United States

- Lane Place
- U.S. National Register of Historic Places
- U.S. Historic district – Contributing property
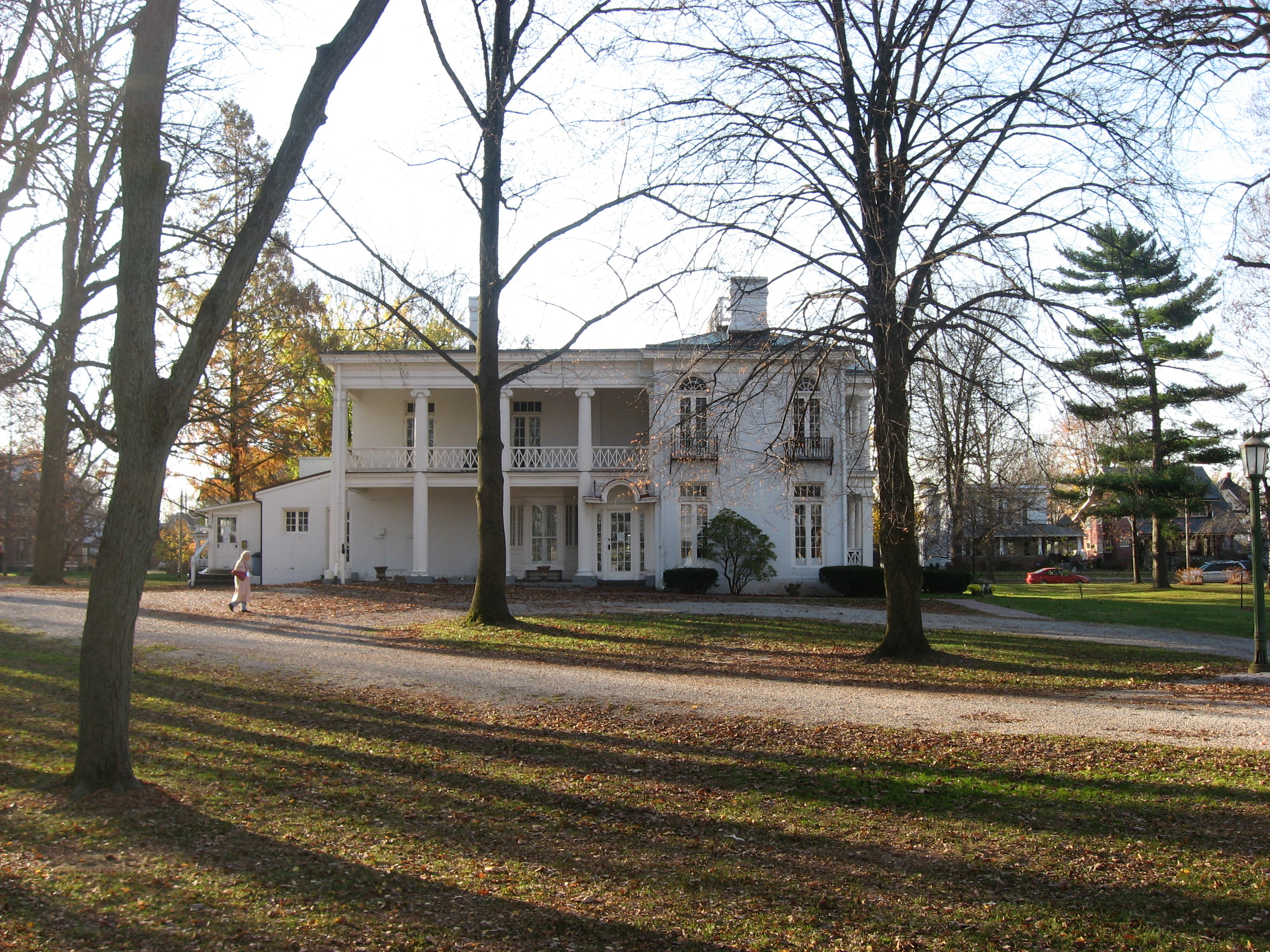
- North Side of the Lane Place

- Location within Indiana Location within the United States
- Location: 212 S. Water St., Crawfordsville, Indiana
- Coordinates: 40°2′24″N 86°53′50″W
- Area: 2.1 acres (0.85 ha)
- Built: 1830
- Architectural style: Federal, Greek Revival, Victorian
- NRHP reference No.: 81000003
- Added to NRHP: November 23, 1981

The Lane Place was the home of Sen. Henry S. Lane (1811–1881) and Joanna Lane (1826–1914). It is located at 212 South Water Street in Crawfordsville, Indiana. Helen Elston Smith, the Lanes' niece, inherited the house after Joanna's death. She willed the house and its contents to the Montgomery County Historical Society on February 26, 1931. 85%-90% of all of the furnishings are either original to the house or belonged to the Elston Family. The house has been a museum since 1931 even though Helen continued to live in the home until the mid-1930s.

It was listed on the National Register of Historic Places in 1981. It is located in the Elston Grove Historic District.

== History ==
The Lane Place was added onto an existing three-room brick cottage, which was built in 1831 by Maria and Isaac Elston. Major Isaac Elston was the father of Joanna Lane, Henry's second wife. Sen. Henry Lane purchased this cottage and the 4 acres (16,000 m^{2}) surrounding it from Isaac Elston in the fall of 1844 when he and Joanna Elston married. Susan Wallace, the sister of Joanna Lane, met her future husband Lew Wallace at a party that was taking place in the house's formal parlor. Sen. Henry Lane was a lawyer and prominent Indiana politician who served in the Indiana legislature and the House of Representatives while with the Whigs. He was then elected Governor of Indiana in 1860 on the Republican ticket, but was soon elected as a Senator instead and served a term between 1861 and 1867. In 1865 he was the Indiana delegate at Lincoln's funeral. In addition, Sen. Lane was one of the leading men to help form the Republican Party.

== Additions to the Lane Place ==
As soon as Henry Lane purchased the three room cottage in 1844 the house was too small for his bride and himself. Henry and Joanna were married in February and 1845 and then moved into the cottage where they immediately began adding onto their home. The first addition were two rooms onto the front of the cottage, and two more rooms were added on top of those rooms. The parlor of the cottage was converted into the Lane's Dining Room. The new addition was not connected to the original cottage at this time. In 1870 a Library was added onto the first floor. The 1831 kitchen was converted into a Serving Pantry and a kitchen was added onto the rear of the Pantry. In 1885 Helen Elston Smith came to live with the Lane's and another bedroom was added onto the second story of the house. There was also a porch added onto the first and second story of the house on the north side. The roof of the original sleeping loft was raised and converted into two rooms. In 1900 the breezeway between the old cottage and new editions was enclosed.

== House Colors ==
The house has been painted various colors since 1845. The Lane Place was painted white through all the additions to the house while Henry and Joanna lived at the property. After Henry's death on June 18, 1881, Joanna painted the house gray in mourning. The house was temporarily painted pink under Helen's ownership from around 1914 to 1920. In 1920 the house was painted yellow. The house remained yellow until 1945 when The Montgomery County Historical Society decided to return it to white. The house has remained white since then.

== Strawberry Festival ==
The grounds of the Lane are the home of the Annual Crawfordsville Strawberry Festival. The Strawberry Festival was started by Joanna as a social gathering for drinking tea. It is held every year in June.
