= Union Township, Montgomery County, Indiana =

Union Township
- Township
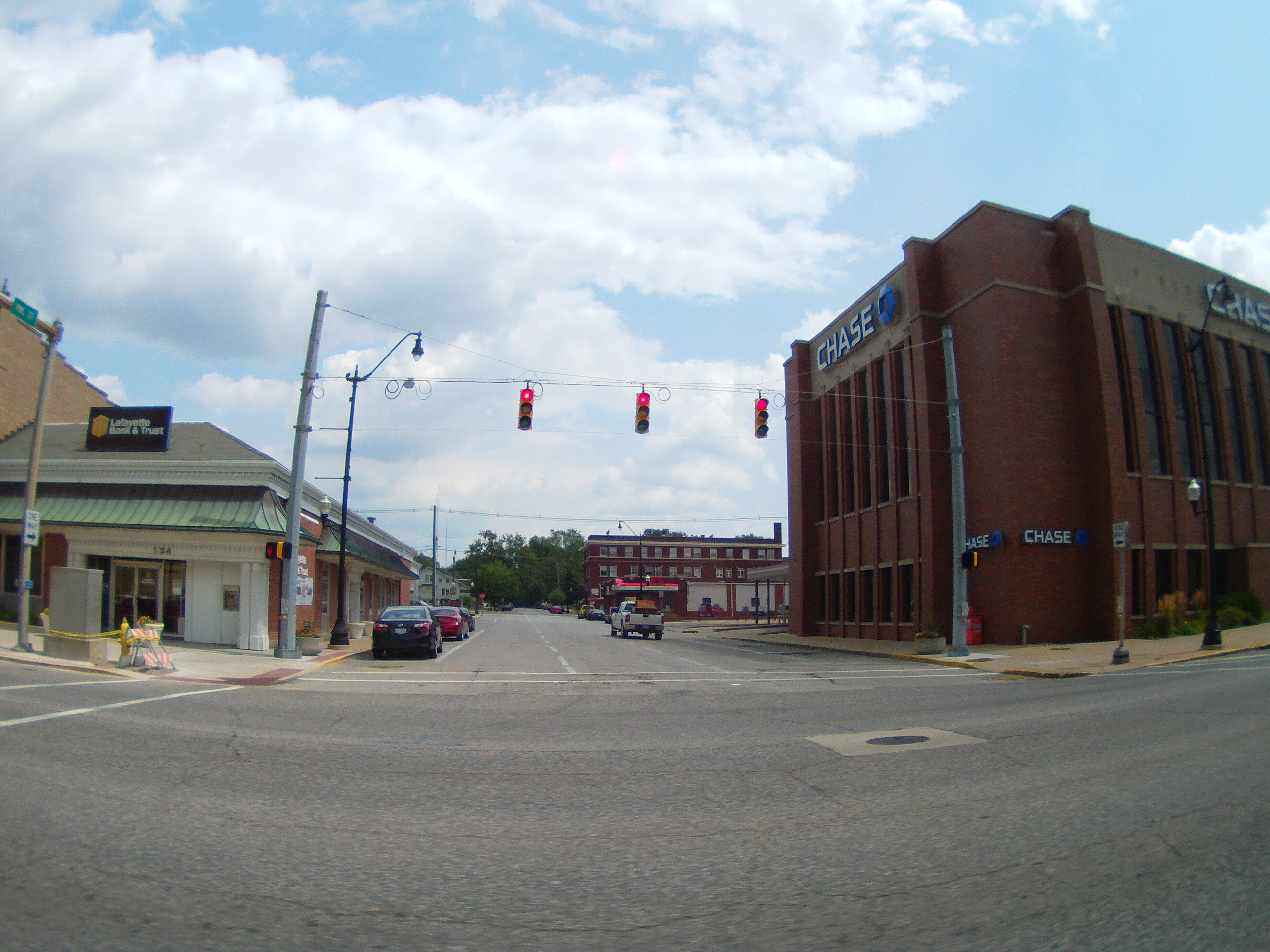
- Downtown Crawfordsville, in Union Township

- Location in Montgomery County
- Coordinates: 40°02′15″N 86°53′51″W
- Country: United States
- State: Indiana
- County: Montgomery

Government
  - Type: Indiana township

Area
  - Total: 111.88 sq mi (289.8 km^{2})
  - Land: 111.58 sq mi (289.0 km^{2})
  - Water: 0.3 sq mi (0.78 km^{2}) 0.27%
- Elevation: 781 ft (238 m)

Population (2020)
  - Total: 25,087
  - Density: 224.83/sq mi (86.809/km^{2})
- Time zone: UTC-5 (Eastern (EST))
  - Summer (DST): UTC-4 (EDT)
- ZIP codes: 47933, 47965, 47968
- Area code: 765
- GNIS feature ID: 453926

Union Township is one of eleven townships in Montgomery County, Indiana, United States. As of the 2020 census, its population was 25,087 (up from 24,587 at 2010) and it contained 10,949 housing units. Wabash College is located in Crawfordsville in this township.

== Geography ==
According to the 2010 census, the township has a total area of 111.88 square miles (289.8 km^{2}), of which 111.58 square miles (289.0 km^{2}) (or 99.73%) is land and 0.3 square miles (0.78 km^{2}) (or 0.27%) is water.

=== Cities, towns, villages ===
- Crawfordsville
- New Market (north half)

=== Unincorporated towns ===
- Balhinch, Indiana
- Fiskville at 40.048654°N 86.89473°W
- Garfield at 40.083097°N 86.823896°W
- Lake Holiday
- North Union at 39.9656°N 86.903341°W
- Smartsburg at 40.046987°N 86.828618°W
- Whitesville at 39.965322°N 86.833618°W

(This list is based on USGS data and may include former settlements.)

=== Cemeteries ===
The township contains these nineteen cemeteries: Ben Hur, Breaks, Calvary, Coons, Finley Chapel, Galey, Harshbarger, Hutton, Independent Order of Odd Fellows, Lutheran, Michael, Nutt, Oak Hill, Oldtown, Sidener, Stover, Weir, Wilhite and Wilson.

=== Major highways ===
- Interstate 74
- U.S. Route 136
- U.S. Route 231
- Indiana State Road 32
- Indiana State Road 47

=== Airports and landing strips ===
- Crawfordsville Municipal Airport

== School districts ==
- Crawfordsville Community School Corporation
- North Montgomery School Corporation
- South Montgomery Community School Corporation

== Political districts ==
- Indiana's 4th congressional district
- State House District 41
- State Senate District 23
