= New Market, Indiana =

- Town
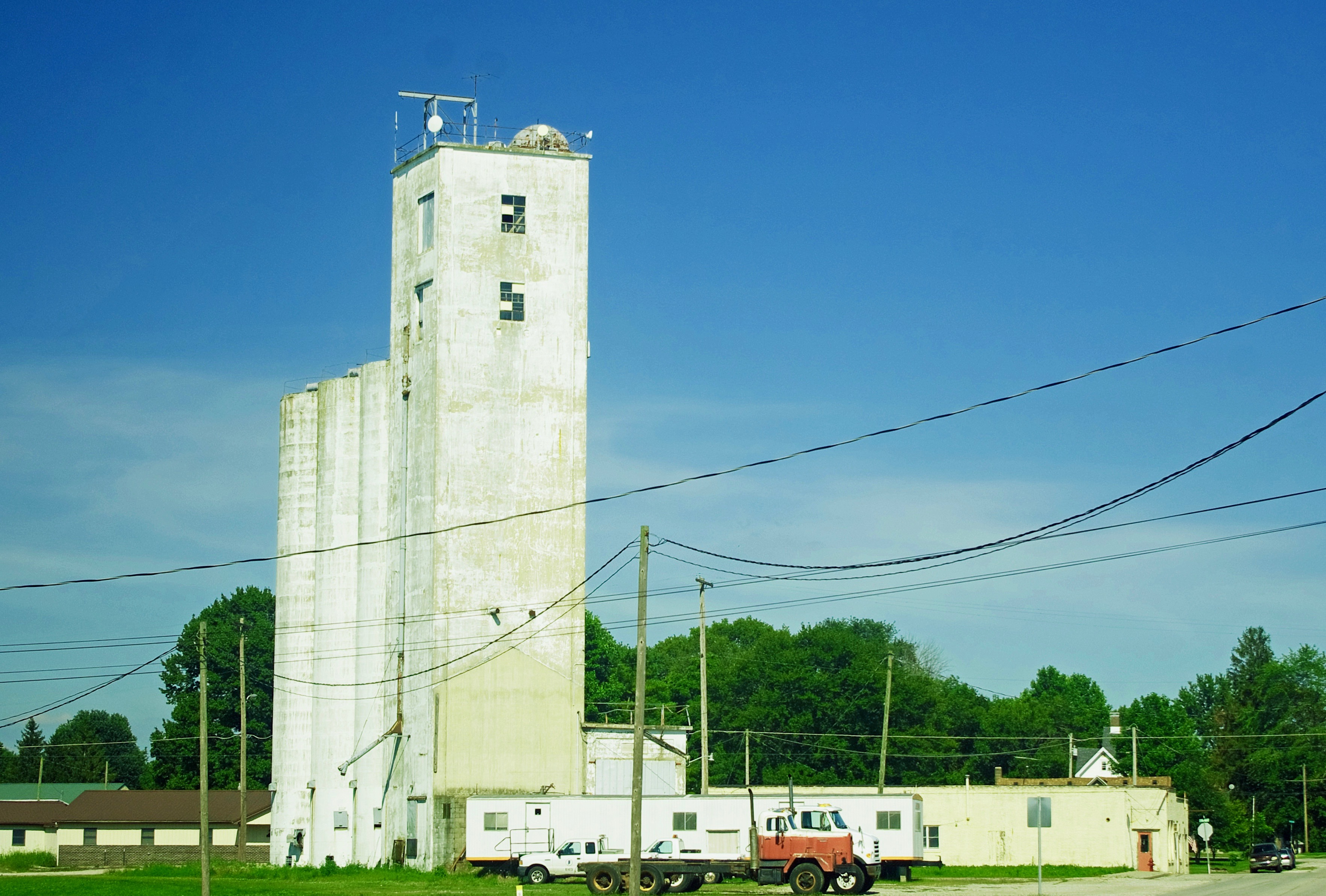
- New Market

- Location in Montgomery County
- Coordinates: 39°57′10″N 86°55′17″W
- Country: United States
- State: Indiana
- County: Montgomery
- Township: Brown, Scott, Union

Area
  - Total: 0.27 sq mi (0.71 km^{2})
  - Land: 0.27 sq mi (0.71 km^{2})
  - Water: 0 sq mi (0.00 km^{2})
- Elevation: 810 ft (250 m)

Population (2020)
  - Total: 559
  - Density: 2,053/sq mi (792.6/km^{2})
- Time zone: UTC-5 (Eastern (EST))
  - Summer (DST): UTC-4 (EDT)
- ZIP code: 47965
- Area code: 765
- FIPS code: 18-53262
- GNIS feature ID: 2396803

New Market is a town in Montgomery County, Indiana, in the United States. The population was 559 at the 2020 census, down from 636 in 2010.

== History ==
The town of New Market was platted in 1872 by Joseph White Sr., Carson Wray Sr., Joseph Kelsey and William K. White, during the construction of the S.C.L & W. Railway through the area. The construction of the line was to serve the cities of Frankfort, Crawfordsville and Terre Haute. In southern Montgomery County it passed through the communities of New Market, Waveland, Browns Valley, Crawfordsville, and Lake Holiday. The line was later sold to the Pennsylvania Railroad and abandoned in the 1970s. The post office at New Market has been in operation since 1872.

In 1893, during the run-up to Prohibition, citizens of New Market burned a saloon owned by Jake Feel; a second saloon, owned by Joe Haskins, was burned in December 1894.

== Geography ==
New Market is located in southern Montgomery County. The town lies northwest of Indianapolis, just west of U.S. Route 231 and east of State Road 47. It is 7 miles (11 km) south of Crawfordsville, the Montgomery county seat.

According to the U.S. Census Bureau, New Market has a total area of 0.27 square miles (0.70 km^{2}), all land. Rattlesnake Creek passes just northeast of the town, flowing northwest to Sugar Creek, a tributary of the Wabash River.

== Demographics ==
Historical population
Census	Pop.	Note	%±
1880	119		—
1910	334		—
1920	403		20.7%
1930	330		−18.1%
1940	323		−2.1%
1950	370		14.6%
1960	578		56.2%
1970	640		10.7%
1980	608		−5.0%
1990	614		1.0%
2000	659		7.3%
2010	636		−3.5%
2020	559		−12.1%
U.S. Decennial Census

=== 2010 census ===
As of the census of 2010, there were 636 people, 238 households, and 179 families living in the town. The population density was 2,271.4 inhabitants per square mile (877.0/km^{2}). There were 257 housing units at an average density of 917.9 per square mile (354.4/km^{2}). The racial makeup of the town was 99.1% White, 0.2% Asian, 0.6% from other races, and 0.2% from two or more races. Hispanic or Latino of any race were 0.9% of the population.

There were 238 households, of which 39.5% had children under the age of 18 living with them, 54.2% were married couples living together, 14.3% had a female householder with no husband present, 6.7% had a male householder with no wife present, and 24.8% were non-families. 21.4% of all households were made up of individuals, and 7.2% had someone living alone who was 65 years of age or older. The average household size was 2.67 and the average family size was 3.08.

The median age in the town was 36.5 years. 29.1% of residents were under the age of 18; 7.8% were between the ages of 18 and 24; 23.7% were from 25 to 44; 24.9% were from 45 to 64; and 14.6% were 65 years of age or older. The gender makeup of the town was 48.7% male and 51.3% female.

=== 2000 census ===
As of the census of 2000, there were 659 people, 241 households, and 187 families living in the town. The population density was 2,059.2 inhabitants per square mile (795.1/km^{2}). There were 248 housing units at an average density of 774.9 per square mile (299.2/km^{2}). The racial makeup of the town was 100.00% White. Hispanic or Latino of any race were 0.15% of the population.

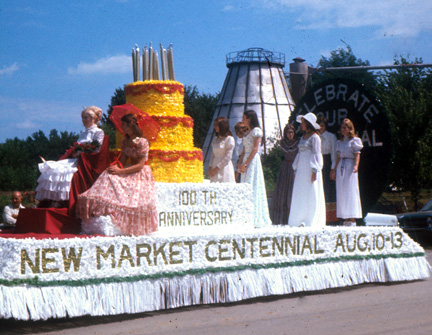
Photo from New Market's Centennial Parade, August 1972

There were 241 households, out of which 41.5% had children under the age of 18 living with them, 66.8% were married couples living together, 9.1% had a female householder with no husband present, and 22.4% were non-families. 19.9% of all households were made up of individuals, and 7.9% had someone living alone who was 65 years of age or older. The average household size was 2.73 and the average family size was 3.13.

In the town, the population was spread out, with 30.0% under the age of 18, 6.2% from 18 to 24, 31.3% from 25 to 44, 22.2% from 45 to 64, and 10.3% who were 65 years of age or older. The median age was 35 years. For every 100 females, there were 88.3 males. For every 100 females age 18 and over, there were 93.7 males.

The median income for a household in the town was $45,385, and the median income for a family was $48,864. Males had a median income of $38,036 versus $21,563 for females. The per capita income for the town was $17,937. None of the families and 0.5% of the population were living below the poverty line, including no under eighteens and none of those over 64.

== Schools ==
South Montgomery Community School Corporation operates public schools serving New Market. New Market Elementary School is in the area. Southmont Junior High School and Southmont High School serve secondary students.

== Organizations ==
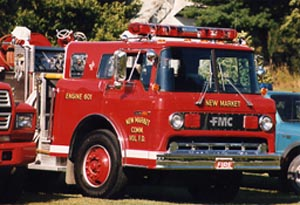
Engine 601 - 1991 Ford FMC

- The New Market Community Volunteer Fire Department and S & W Rescue operate an engine in New Market.

== Climate ==
This climatic region has large seasonal temperature differences, with warm to hot (and often humid) summers and cold (sometimes severely cold) winters. The Köppen Climate Classification subtype for this climate is "Dfa" (Hot Summer Continental Climate).
