= New Ross, Indiana =

- Town
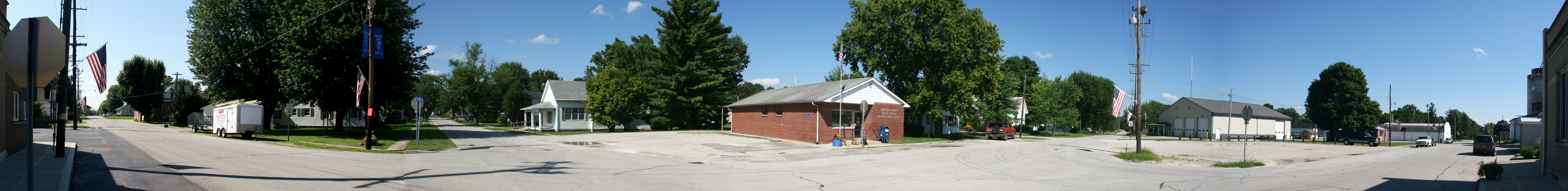
- The corner of State and Main and the New Ross Post Office

- Location in Montgomery County
- Coordinates: 39°57′53″N 86°42′51″W
- Country: United States
- State: Indiana
- County: Montgomery
- Township: Walnut

Area
  - Total: 0.30 sq mi (0.77 km^{2})
  - Land: 0.30 sq mi (0.77 km^{2})
  - Water: 0 sq mi (0.00 km^{2})
- Elevation: 886 ft (270 m)

Population (2020)
  - Total: 309
  - Density: 1,035.0/sq mi (399.62/km^{2})
- Time zone: UTC-5 (Eastern (EST))
  - Summer (DST): UTC-4 (EDT)
- ZIP code: 47968
- Area code: 765
- FIPS code: 18-53550
- GNIS feature ID: 2396809
- Website: Town of New Ross

New Ross is a town in Walnut Township, Montgomery County, in the U.S. state of Indiana. As of the 2020 census, the town population was 309.

== History ==
In 1836–37 a post office was established in Walnut Township at the home of postmaster George Dorsey, and called the New Ross Post Office. New Ross, then called Valley City, was platted by John Browning in 1855. In about 1868, the post office was moved to Valley City and the name of the city was changed to New Ross to match the post office name. New Ross was incorporated in May 1870.

In 1874, a Methodist church was built in New Ross. It was named Brown Chapel after Rev. Thomas J. Brown, who first preached there.

In an early map from 1864, the area now known as New Ross was called "Mace". Mace disappeared from later maps. (Note that Mace is an unincorporated area northwest of New Ross on U.S. Route 136.)

== Geography ==
New Ross is located in southeastern Montgomery County. U.S. Route 136 passes through the town, leading northwest 11 miles (18 km) to Crawfordsville, the county seat, and southeast 33 miles (53 km) to Indianapolis.

According to the U.S. Census Bureau, New Ross has a total area of 0.30 square miles (0.78 km^{2}), all land. The town is drained by unnamed tributaries of Big Raccoon Creek, which passes just south of the town and runs southwest to the Wabash River near Montezuma.

== Demographics ==
Historical population
Census	Pop.	Note	%±
1880	317		—
1890	270		−14.8%
1900	284		5.2%
1910	296		4.2%
1920	351		18.6%
1930	350		−0.3%
1940	355		1.4%
1950	336		−5.4%
1960	332		−1.2%
1970	318		−4.2%
1980	306		−3.8%
1990	331		8.2%
2000	334		0.9%
2010	347		3.9%
2020	309		−11.0%
U.S. Decennial Census

=== 2010 census ===
As of the census of 2010, there were 347 people, 135 households, and 89 families living in the town. The population density was 1,084.4 inhabitants per square mile (418.7/km^{2}). There were 147 housing units at an average density of 459.4 per square mile (177.4/km^{2}). The racial makeup of the town was 96.8% White, 0.6% from other races, and 2.6% from two or more races. Hispanic or Latino of any race were 1.7% of the population.

There were 135 households, of which 35.6% had children under the age of 18 living with them, 55.6% were married couples living together, 5.2% had a female householder with no husband present, 5.2% had a male householder with no wife present, and 34.1% were non-families. 29.6% of all households were made up of individuals, and 11.1% had someone living alone who was 65 years of age or older. The average household size was 2.57 and the average family size was 3.26.

The median age in the town was 35.5 years. 28.8% of residents were under the age of 18; 6.3% were between the ages of 18 and 24; 26.8% were from 25 to 44; 23.9% were from 45 to 64; and 14.1% were 65 years of age or older. The gender makeup of the town was 51.9% male and 48.1% female.

=== 2000 census ===
As of the census of 2000, there were 334 people, 129 households, and 94 families living in the town. The population density was 1,153.1 inhabitants per square mile (445.2/km^{2}). There were 138 housing units at an average density of 476.5 per square mile (184.0/km^{2}). The racial makeup of the town was 97.01% White, 2.40% from other races, and 0.60% from two or more races. Hispanic or Latino of any race were 2.40% of the population.

There were 129 households, out of which 38.0% had children under the age of 18 living with them, 60.5% were married couples living together, 9.3% had a female householder with no husband present, and 26.4% were non-families. 24.8% of all households were made up of individuals, and 14.0% had someone living alone who was 65 years of age or older. The average household size was 2.59 and the average family size was 3.07.

In the town, the population was spread out, with 30.2% under the age of 18, 3.9% from 18 to 24, 34.7% from 25 to 44, 19.5% from 45 to 64, and 11.7% who were 65 years of age or older. The median age was 32 years. For every 100 females, there were 110.1 males. For every 100 females age 18 and over, there were 92.6 males.

The median income for a household in the town was $38,250, and the median income for a family was $42,222. Males had a median income of $37,841 versus $25,795 for females. The per capita income for the town was $15,834. About 3.3% of families and 4.9% of the population were below the poverty line, including 10.5% of those under age 18 and none of those age 65 or over.

== Education ==
South Montgomery Community School Corporation operates public schools serving New Ross. Walnut Elementary School is in the area. Southmont Junior High School and Southmont High School serve secondary students.

== Notable people ==
- Elizabeth Miller (1878–1961), novelist
- Howie Williams, basketball player; 1952 Olympic gold medalist; three-time AAU National Champion, two-time All-Big Ten basketball player; 1946 graduate of New Ross High School.

== Gallery ==
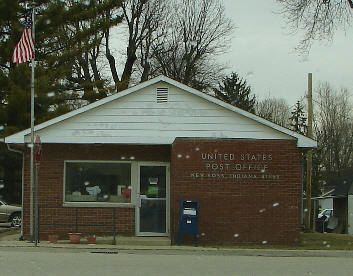
New Ross Post Office

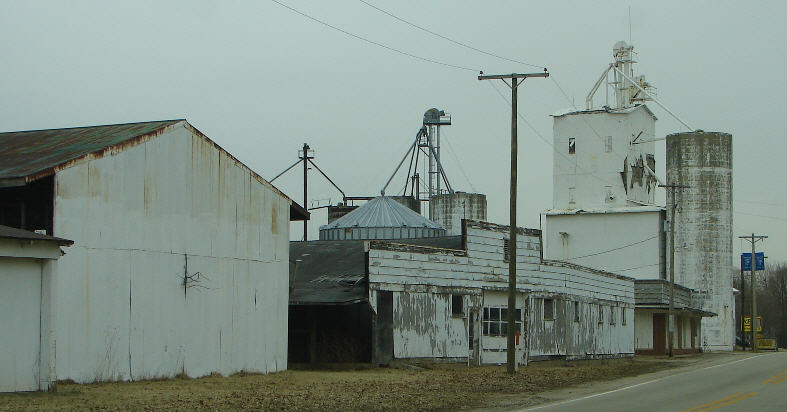
Grain facility in New Ross

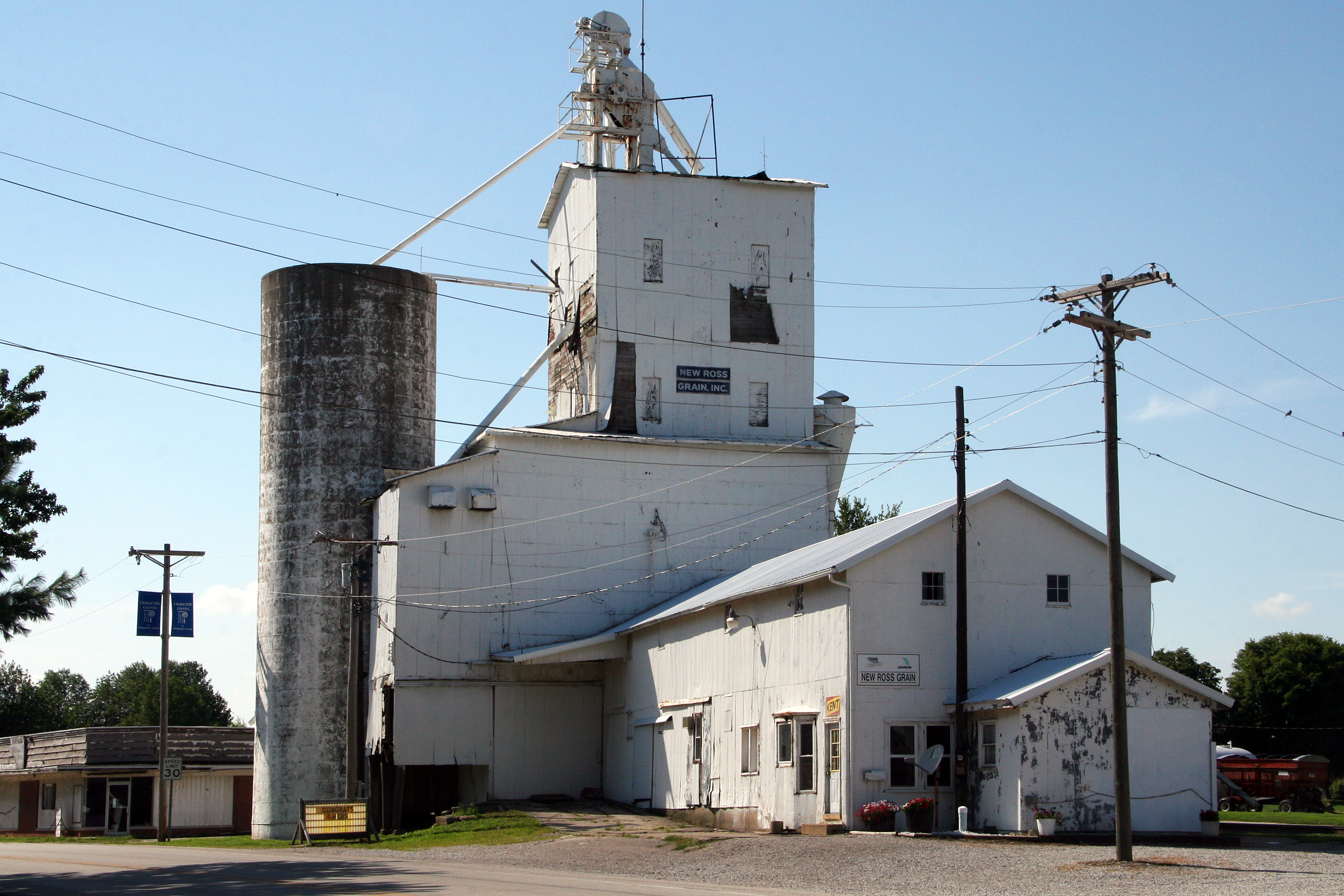
The old grain elevator
