= Scott Township, Montgomery County, Indiana =

Scott Township
- Township
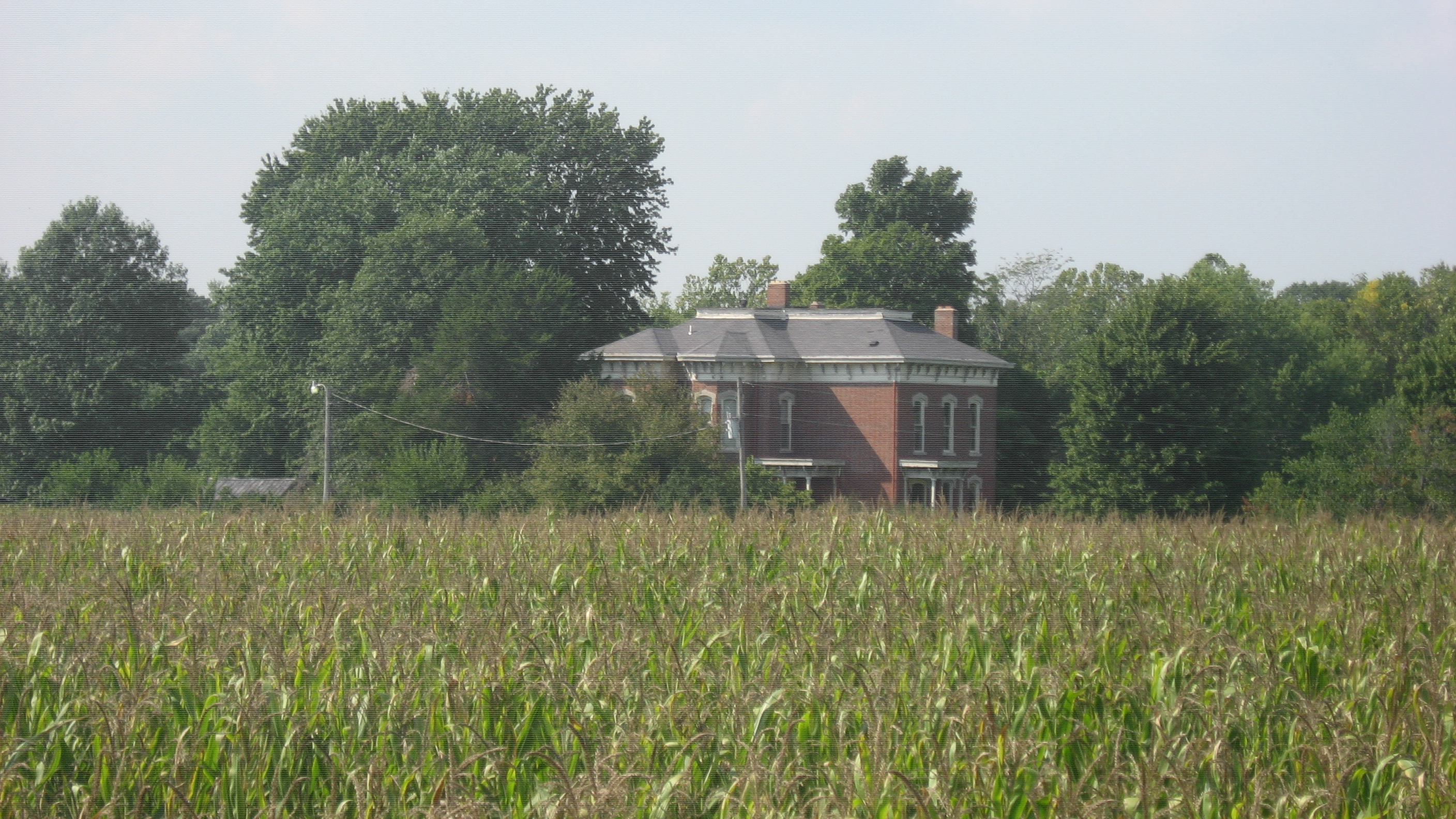
- Ashby, a historic home in the township

- Location in Montgomery County
- Coordinates: 39°54′40″N 86°52′13″W
- Country: United States
- State: Indiana
- County: Montgomery

Government
  - Type: Indiana township

Area
  - Total: 35.88 sq mi (92.9 km^{2})
  - Land: 35.87 sq mi (92.9 km^{2})
  - Water: 0.01 sq mi (0.026 km^{2}) 0.03%
- Elevation: 850 ft (259 m)

Population (2020)
  - Total: 776
  - Density: 21.6/sq mi (8.35/km^{2})
- Time zone: UTC-5 (Eastern (EST))
  - Summer (DST): UTC-4 (EDT)
- ZIP codes: 47933, 47954, 47965, 47968
- Area code: 765
- GNIS feature ID: 453837

Scott Township is one of eleven townships in Montgomery County, Indiana, United States. As of the 2020 census, its population was 776 (down from 837 at 2010) and it contained 342 housing units.

== History ==
Ashby was listed on the National Register of Historic Places in 1980.

== Geography ==
According to the 2010 census, the township has a total area of 35.88 square miles (92.9 km^{2}), of which 35.87 square miles (92.9 km^{2}) (or 99.97%) is land and 0.01 square miles (0.026 km^{2}) (or 0.03%) is water.

=== Cities, towns, villages ===
- New Market (southeast corner)

=== Unincorporated towns ===
- Lapland at 39.905044°N 86.902786°W
- Parkersburg at 39.873378°N 86.902786°W

=== Cemeteries ===
The township contains these cemeteries: Brethren, Cornstalk, Fall, James, Old Harshbarger, Old Pottinger, Wasson, Welch.

=== Major highways ===
- U.S. Route 231

== School districts ==
- South Montgomery Community School Corporation

== Political districts ==
- Indiana's 4th congressional district
- State House District 28
- State House District 41
- State Senate District 23
