= Walnut Township, Montgomery County, Indiana =

Walnut Township
- Township
- Location in Montgomery County
- Coordinates: 39°59′38″N 86°45′07″W
- Country: United States
- State: Indiana
- County: Montgomery

Government
  - Type: Indiana township

Area
  - Total: 36.41 sq mi (94.3 km^{2})
  - Land: 36.41 sq mi (94.3 km^{2})
  - Water: 0 sq mi (0 km^{2}) 0%
- Elevation: 869 ft (265 m)

Population (2020)
  - Total: 1,303
  - Density: 35.79/sq mi (13.82/km^{2})
- Time zone: UTC-5 (Eastern (EST))
  - Summer (DST): UTC-4 (EDT)
- ZIP codes: 47933, 47954, 47968
- Area code: 765
- GNIS feature ID: 453971

Walnut Township is one of eleven townships in Montgomery County, Indiana, United States. As of the 2020 census, its population was 1,303 (down from 1,394 in 2010) and it contained 568 housing units.

== Geography ==
According to the 2010 census, the township has a total area of 36.41 square miles (94.3 km^{2}), all land.

=== Cities, towns, villages ===
- New Ross

=== Unincorporated towns ===
- Beckville at 40.010598°N 86.709728°W
- Linnsburg at 40.000321°N 86.800007°W
- Log Cabin Crossroads at 40.025320°N 86.700283°W
- Mace at 40.010321°N 86.796396°W

(This list is based on USGS data and may include former settlements.)

=== Cemeteries ===
The township contains these two cemeteries: New Ross and Pisgah.

=== Major highways ===
- Interstate 74
- U.S. Route 136

== School districts ==
- South Montgomery Community School Corporation

== Political districts ==
- Indiana's 4th congressional district
- State House District 28
- State Senate District 23
