= Lake Holiday =

Lake Holiday may refer to:

- Lake Holiday (Illinois), a lake in LaSalle County, Illinois
- Lake Holiday, Illinois, a census-designated place located on Lake Holiday, LaSalle County, Illinois
- Lake Holiday, Virginia, a gated community north of Winchester, Virginia
- Lake Holiday, Indiana, a large, private, unincorporated community (including several subdivisions) near Crawfordsville, Indiana
