= Whitesville =

Whitesville can refer to a place in the United States:

- Whitesville, Georgia
- Whitesville, Indiana
- Whitesville, Kentucky
- Whitesville, Missouri
- Whitesville, Monmouth County, New Jersey
- Whitesville, Ocean County, New Jersey
- Whitesville, New York
- Whitesville, West Virginia
