= Southmont High School =

Southmont Sr. High School

Location
- 6425 US 231 South; Crawfordsville, Indiana 47933; United States
- 39.947504°N 86.905568°W

Information
- Type: Public high school
- School district: South Montgomery Community School Corporation
- Superintendent: Chad Cripe
- Principal: Ashley Hammond
- Faculty: 34.50 (FTE)
- Grades: 9-12
- Enrollment: 453 (2023-24)
- Student to teacher ratio: 13.13
- Campus size: 2A (IHSAA)
- Color
- Athletics conference: Sagamore
- Team name: Mounties
- Website: Official Website

Southmont High School is a public high school located at 6425 US 231 South, unincorporated Montgomery County, Indiana, east of New Market and south of Crawfordsville. It is a part of the South Montgomery Community School Corporation.

Communities served include portions of Crawfordsville, Alamo, Ladoga, Lake Holiday, New Market, New Ross, and Waveland.

== Quality of Education ==
Southmont High School offers a variety of courses including dual credit and Advanced Placement courses. Southmont High School participates in the West Central Career and Technical Education Cooperative.

== See also ==
- Sagamore Conference
- Crawfordsville, Indiana
- List of high schools in Indiana

Other high schools in Montgomery County:

- Crawfordsville High School
- North Montgomery High School
