= Browns Valley =

Browns Valley can refer to several locations in the United States:

- Browns Valley, California
- Browns Valley, Indiana
- Browns Valley, Minnesota
  - Browns Valley divide
- Browns Valley Township, Big Stone County, Minnesota
