= Old Crawfordsville High School =

- Crawfordsville High School
- U.S. National Register of Historic Places
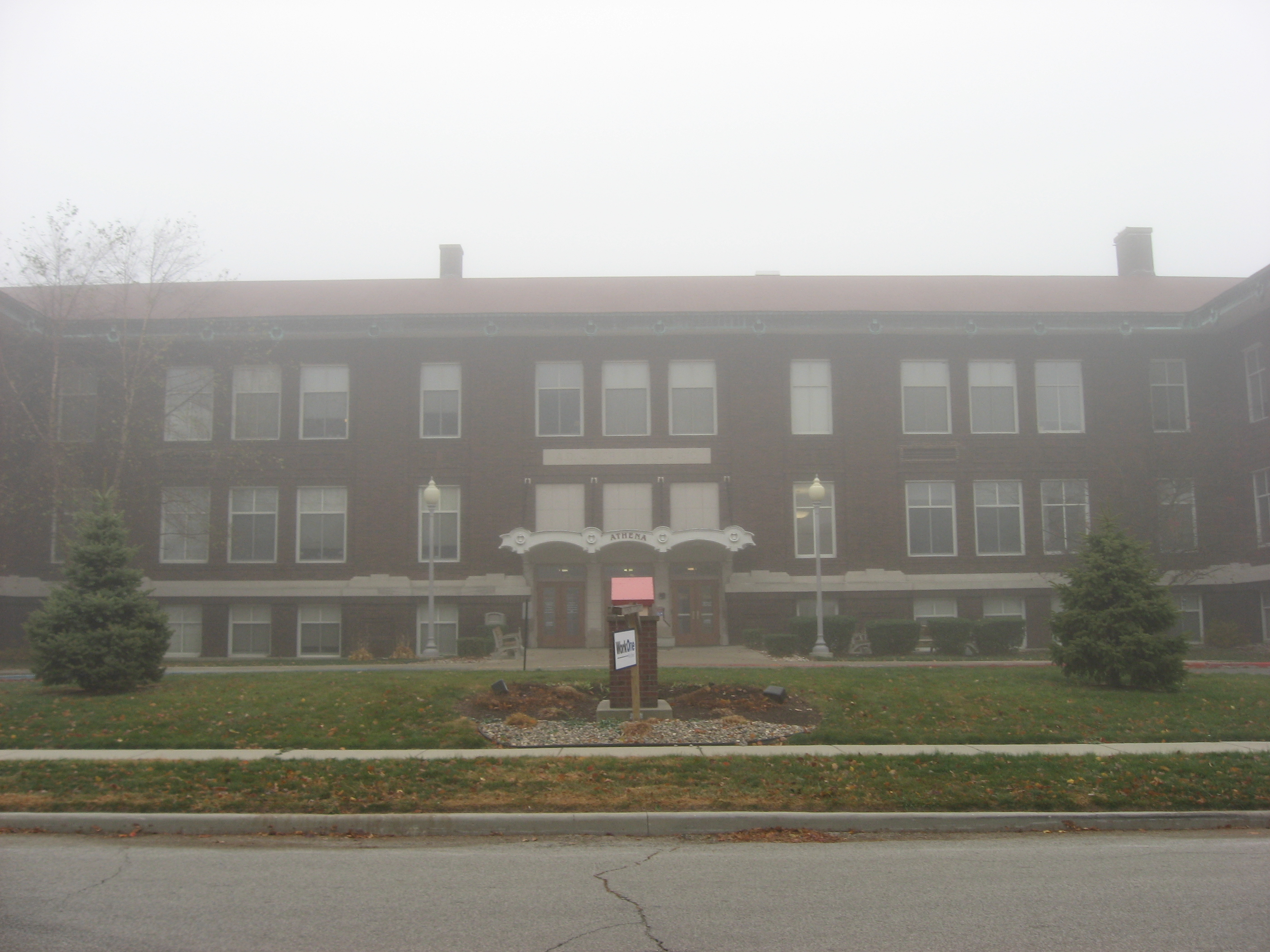
- Front of the former school

- Location within Indiana
- Location: 201 East Jefferson Street, Crawfordsville, Indiana
- Coordinates: 40°2′15″N 86°53′59″W
- Area: 3 acres (1.2 ha)
- Built: 1910 School Colors : Royal Blue and Yellow Gold
- MPS: Indiana's Public Common and High Schools MPS
- NRHP reference No.: 03000543
- Added to NRHP: June 22, 2003

Old Crawfordsville High School is a former public high school erected in 1910 on East Jefferson Street in Crawfordsville, Indiana. It was a part of the Crawfordsville Community Schools. The old building was expanded in 1914, 1921, and 1941 to provide additional classrooms, an auditorium, and a gymnasium. A new Crawfordsville High School facility opened at One Athenian Drive in 1993. In 2000 the old school building was converted to a multi-use facility of offices, residential housing, and a fitness center. The former high school building was added to the National Register of Historic Places in 2003. The former high school became a senior living facility and in 2019 was converted into 99 apartment units called The Laurel Flats.

== History ==
The Old Crawfordsville High School was located on East Jefferson Street in Crawfordsville, the seat of government for Montgomery County, Indiana. It served as the town's high school from 1911 to 1993. The building was converted to mixed-use facility in 2000 and added to the National Register of Historic Places in 2003. A new Crawfordsville High School at One Athenian Drive opened in the fall of 1993.

=== Central School ===
Crawfordsville's Central School was constructed on what was known as Jefferson Square, bounded by Jefferson, College, Seminary, and School streets, for $44,000 in 1873. Before additional grade schools were constructed, the brick school building accommodated students in all grades. Robert Krout, the local school board president, delivered a commencement address on the subject of women's equality to the first graduating class of ten students graduated in 1877. (Krout was the father of feminist authors Mary Hannah Krout and Caroline Virginia Krout, who would later teach at the school.) An addition to the twelve-room, three-story school was completed in 1880.

By 1880 Central School had become overcrowded and additional schools were built to accommodate the increasing enrollment. In addition, a fire in 1882 required Central School to be renovated. Construction began on a new high school in 1910 and Central School was demolished around 1919.

=== Former Crawfordsville High School ===
In 1910 construction began on a new school on the Central School's property along Jefferson Street. The new building became known as Crawfordsville High School. The following year, 1911, the boys' basketball team won the first Indiana High School Boys Basketball Tournament.

In 1914 the high school was remodeled to include the extension of wings on either side of the main building. Construction work began in 1919 to add more classrooms and a 2,500-seat auditorium to the school. (The old Central School building was demolished to provide space for the auditorium addition.) In 1941 a Works Projects Administration project included the construction of eight classrooms and a gymnasium on the south side of the school.

The Class of 1921 was the first to receive their high school diplomas in the new auditorium. The Class of 1976 became the high school's 100th graduating class.

In 1993 classes moved to a new Crawfordsville High School facility at One Athenian Drive, along State Road 47, near the city's southwest corner.

=== Mixed-use facility ===
In 2000 the school building on East Jefferson Street was converted into offices, a fitness center that incorporates the school's 1939 gymnasium, one- and two-bedroom residential units, and spaces for other uses. The former high school was added into the National Register of Historic Places in 2003.

== Description ==
The Prairie School-style school, designed by the Chicago architectural firm of Patton and Miller, faces north on Jefferson Street. The two-story, symmetrical-plan building on a raised basement has "cross-hipped roof" with "overhanging eaves" and wing additions extending on its east and west sides.

The brick building's original roof was covered in terracotta tiles, later replaced with asphalt shingles. The main entrance to the building is centered on the north elevation; the gymnasium projects from the south end of the main building. Other entrances are located on the east, south, and west sides of the school. Most of the building's windows have single openings.

Brick pilasters on limestone bases vertically divide the exterior of the building. A canopy is suspended over the main entrance. A stone panel above the entrance canopy reads, "A.D. * High School * 1910" and the word "Gymnasium" is carved above the gym's entrances.

Interior staircases from the main floor lead to the basement and two upper floors. Classrooms and school offices have been converted into residential units. The auditorium's audience space has been converted to offices; however, its two-story proscenium and gallery have been retained. The gymnasium also retains many of its original features, including its wooden basketball floor, wood and cast-iron bench seats, scoreboards, and two locker rooms. The gymnasium's basement level has been subdivided and modified; it includes a lap pool and whirlpool tub.

== Notable alumni ==
- Joseph P. Allen
- Joseph Stephen Crane
- Linda Evans
- Ward Lambert
- Kenyon Nicholson
- Robert E. Vaughan
- Maurine Dallas Watkins

== See also ==
- List of high schools in Indiana

Schools in Montgomery County:

- North Montgomery High School
- Southmont High School
