= Fiskville =

Fiskville may refer to:

- Fiskville, Victoria
- CFA Training College, Fiskville, Victoria, Australia
- Fiskville, Indiana, an unincorporated community
