= Brown Township, Montgomery County, Indiana =

Brown Township
- Township
- Location in Montgomery County
- Coordinates: 39°54′34″N 87°00′23″W
- Country: United States
- State: Indiana
- County: Montgomery

Government
  - Type: Indiana township

Area
  - Total: 54.22 sq mi (140.4 km^{2})
  - Land: 53.75 sq mi (139.2 km^{2})
  - Water: 0.47 sq mi (1.2 km^{2}) 0.87%
- Elevation: 801 ft (244 m)

Population (2020)
  - Total: 1,617
  - Density: 30.08/sq mi (11.62/km^{2})
- Time zone: UTC-5 (Eastern (EST))
  - Summer (DST): UTC-4 (EDT)
- ZIP codes: 47933, 47954, 47965, 47989
- Area code: 765
- GNIS feature ID: 453139

Brown Township is one of eleven townships in Montgomery County, Indiana, United States. As of the 2020 census, its population was 1,617 (down from 1,719 at 2010) and it contained 705 housing units.

== Geography ==
According to the 2010 census, the township has a total area of 54.22 square miles (140.4 km^{2}), of which 53.75 square miles (139.2 km^{2}) (or 99.13%) is land and 0.47 square miles (1.2 km^{2}) (or 0.87%) is water.

=== Cities, towns, villages ===
- New Market (southwest corner)
- Waveland

=== Unincorporated towns ===
- Browns Valley at 39.9031°N 86.991954°W
- Sycamore Ford at 39.958377°N 87.046676°W

(This list is based on USGS data and may include former settlements.)

=== Cemeteries ===
The township contains these eight cemeteries: Indian Creek, Indian Creek Hill, Jones, Lydick, Maple Ridge, Old Hickory, Old Union and Wasson.

=== Major highways ===
- Indiana State Road 47

=== Airports and landing strips ===
- Shades State Park Airport

=== Landmarks ===
- Lake Waveland Park
- Shades State Park (southeast three-quarters)

== Education ==
- South Montgomery Community School Corporation

Brown Township is served by the Waveland-Brown Township Public Library.

== Political districts ==
- Indiana's 4th congressional district
- State House District 28
- State Senate District 23
