= Elizabeth Miller (novelist) =

American novelist

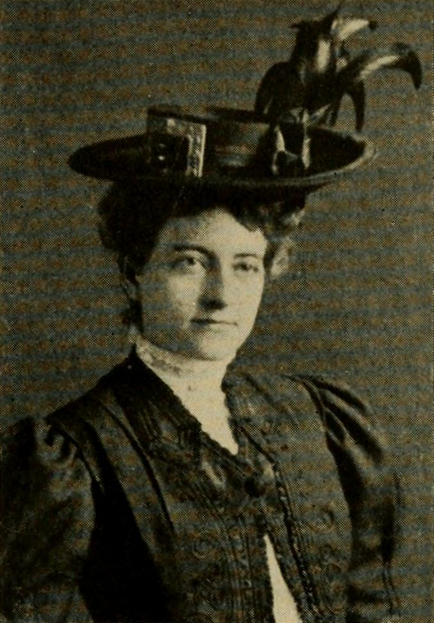
- Elizabeth Miller in 1908
- Born: August 17, 1878; Montgomery County, Indiana, US
- Died: August 19, 1961 (aged 83); Indianapolis, Indiana, US
- Education: Butler College
- Spouse: Oren S. Hack (m. 1908; died 1942)
- Writing career
- Genre: Historical fiction
- Notable works: The Yoke (1904); Saul of Tarsus (1906); The City of Delight (1907); Daybreak, a Story of the Age of Discovery (1915); The Science of Christopher Columbus (1923)

Elizabeth Miller (August 17, 1878 – August 19, 1961) was an American novelist who wrote "best-sellers" during the same era as fellow Hoosiers Lew Wallace, Maurice Thompson, Booth Tarkington, Charles Major, Meredith Nicholson, and George Barr McCutcheon. Her first three novels, a trilogy, set forth the rise, triumph and decline of Judaism, and placed Miller near the top among the list of writers of modern classics of her day, her strength lying in her ability to produce "atmosphere" and in a certain acute sense of values in reproducing scenes of the Orient.

== Early life and education ==
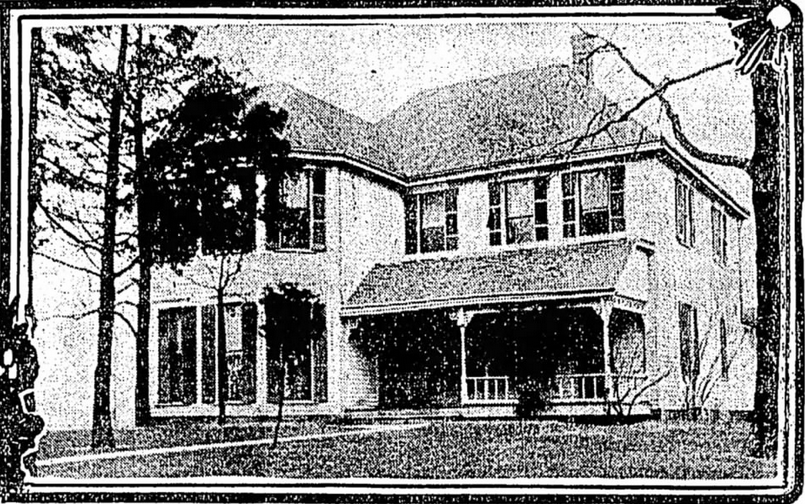
Miller's home in Indianapolis, 1904

Elizabeth ("Bessie") Jane Miller was born on a farm in Montgomery County, Indiana, near New Ross, Indiana, on August 17, 1878. Her parents were Timothy and Samantha (West) Miller.

She first manifested a literary instinct in her childhood. The family removed to Indianapolis in 1883. There, she lived on Prospect Street and developed a passion for growing flowers.

She was educated in several schools in Indianapolis, including St. Patrick's parochial, the public schools, and Manual Training High School (now Emmerich Manual High School). The first newspaper comment on her work was made on a short story in early English dialect published in a school paper during her first year in high school.

Entering Butler College in Irvington, Indiana, in the fall of 1897 as a sophomore, she carried the most work possible in college, forty hours a week; in addition, she took ten hours a week under private instructors. Her education at Butler College was directed along the line of letters and her natural inclination toward classics shaped her choice of field early in her studies. She also made a specialty of higher mathematics and the sciences, and her proficiency in these was marked. In addition to her schoolwork, she began to write verse and letters of travel for the Indianapolis News. The strain from this work, three times that of the average student, was too much and, with her health failing, she was obliged to leave a month before graduation.

== Career ==
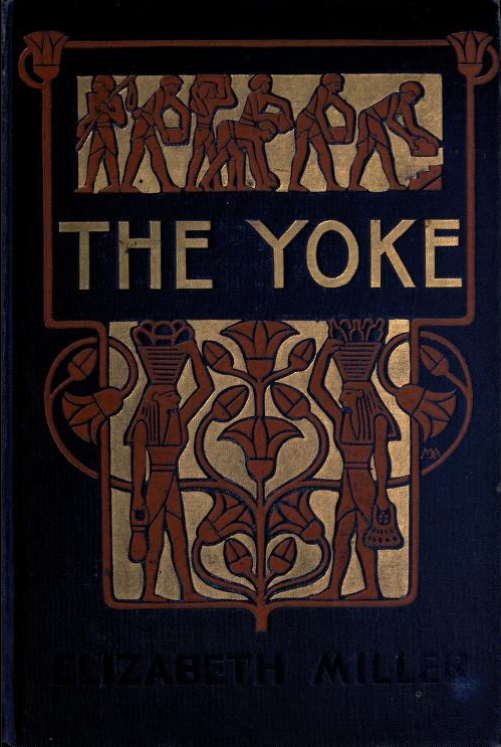
The Yoke

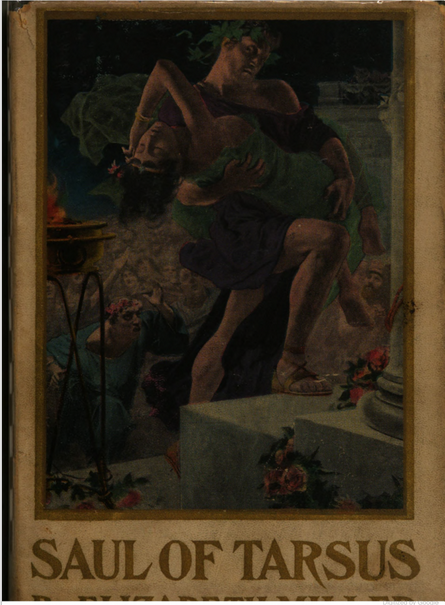
Saul of Tarsus

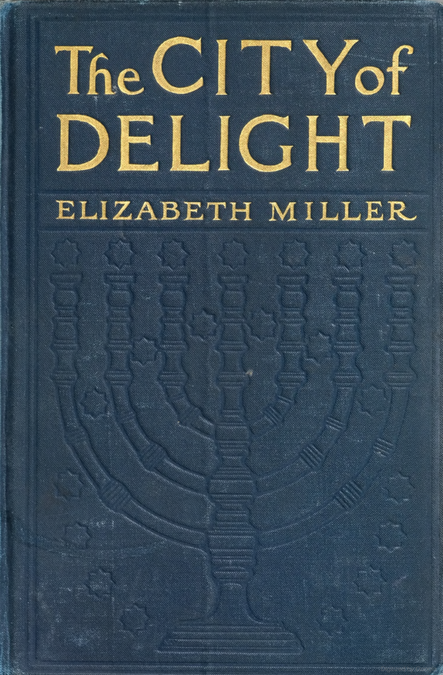
The City of Delight

Miller dealt with Far Eastern themes, Egypt during the Captivity in The Yoke (1904), and the early days of Christianity in Saul of Tarsus (1906) and the City of Delight (1907). In 1901, without previous experience in novel-writing, she began The Yoke, a story of The Exodus, upon the frame-work of a plot constructed by her brother, Percy Miller. As the product of an exceedingly young and hitherto unknown writer, the novel was subjected to the closest scrutiny by ministers, archaeologists, and newspaper men while it was in the form of advance sheets and was finally published by the Bobbs-Merrill Company with the commendation of 1,500 prominent ministers, educators, professionals, and literary editors of the U.S. The same year, Miller entered into contract with the publishing house for Saul of Tarsus.

During the winter of 1904–05, Miller was called upon to give readings before literary organizations in Indiana. Many of the requests were for reviews of her book, The Yoke. After its original publication, it was published serially in The Indianapolis Star, starting in November 1904.

Saul of Tarsus was produced in 1906. It shared the same historical accuracy and attention to detail as her earlier work.

In April 1907, Miller returned to Butler College for the spring term. She was a student of German for 14 years, and her work in the German department, under Prof. Joseph K. Egger, was a review of the grammar. Many of the archaeological works on Egypt and Palestine, the scenes of her third novel, were written in German, and she preferred to read it first hand. At the end of the term, she would graduate with the class of 1907.

In less than two years time after her second novel, her third novel, completing a trilogy, was issued under the title, The City of Delight, with pictures by Frank Xavier Leyendecker. Published by Bobbs-Merrill Company, it was a Biblical novel around a Jewish maiden and her lover.

On June 16, 1908, she married Oren S. Hack (d. 1942), an Indianapolis attorney. A few years after marriage, they moved from Indianapolis to the 174 acres (70 ha) Hack farm, Hackshill, in Boggstown, Indiana. They had five children, Virginia, John, Stephen, Joseph, and Eleanor. By 1960, she had returned to Indianapolis to live with her daughter, Eleanor, but continued running the Hack farm.

Her later publications included, Daybreak, a Story of the Age of Discovery (1915) and The Science of Christopher Columbus (1923).

== Personal life ==
Her summers were spent traveling through the West, the Rocky Mountains, and the Pacific coast states.

She was affiliated with or a member of several organizations including the local dramatic club, a landscape unit of the Purdue University extension service, the Republican party, and Kappa Alpha Theta sorority. In religion, she was a member of the Presbyterian church.

Miller died at her home in Indianapolis on August 19, 1961. Some of her papers and letters are held by Indiana University.

== Selected works ==
- The Yoke, 1904
- Saul of Tarsus, 1906
- The City of Delight, 1907
- Daybreak, a Story of the Age of Discovery, 1915
- The Science of Christopher Columbus, 1923
