= Krout =

Krout is a surname. Notable people with the surname include:

- Caroline Virginia Krout (1852–1931), American author, sister of Mary
- Mary Hannah Krout (1851–1927), American journalist, author, and women's suffrage activist

== See also ==
- Krout Glacier
