= T.C. Steele Boyhood Home =

Historic house in Indiana, United States

- U.S. National Register of Historic Places
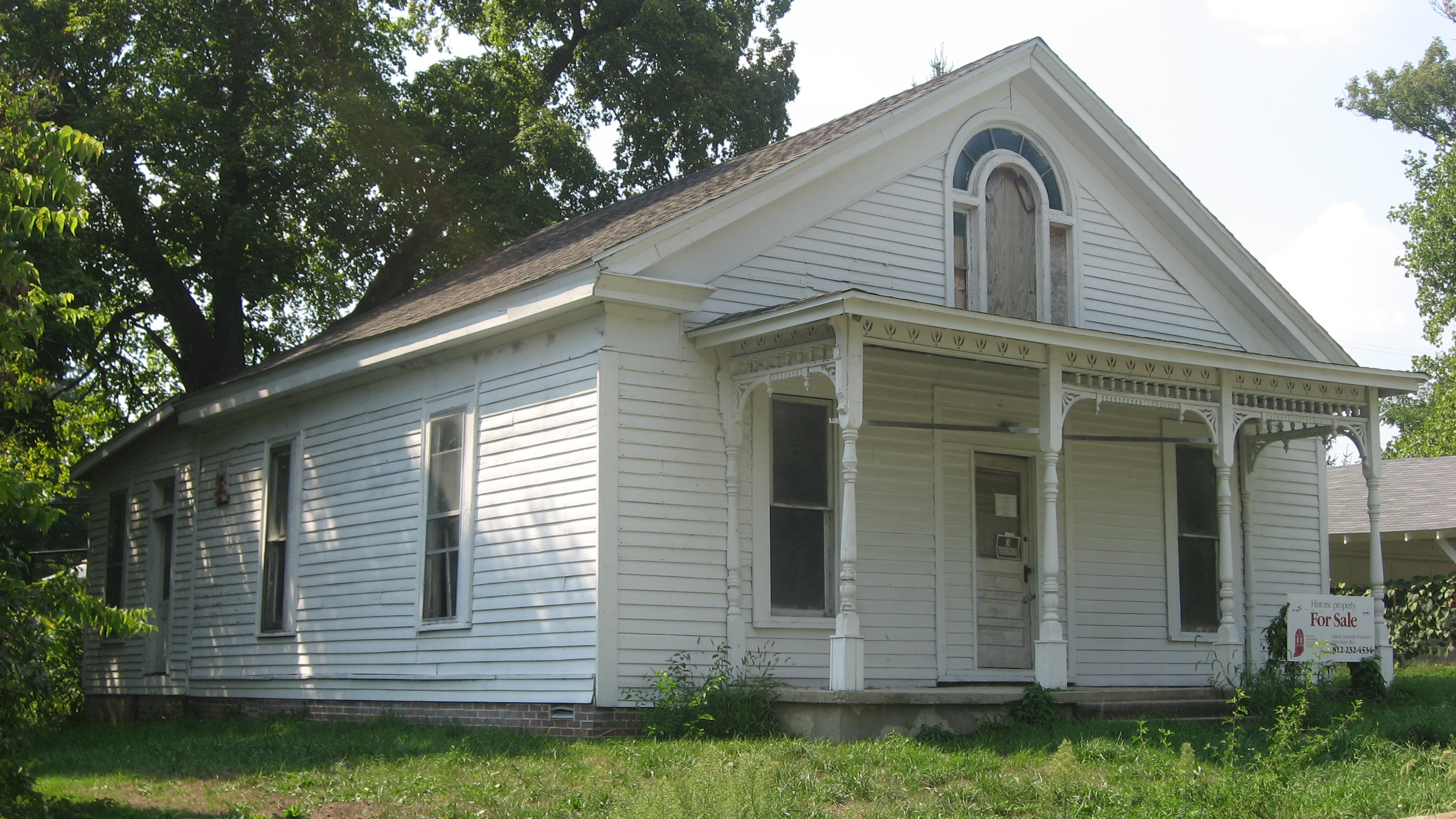
- T.C. Steele Boyhood Home, August 2012

- Location within Indiana Location within the United States
- Location: 110 S. Cross St., Waveland, Indiana
- Coordinates: 39°52′32″N 87°2′40″W
- Area: Less than 1 acre (0.40 ha)
- Built: c. 1852
- Architectural style: Greek Revival
- NRHP reference No.: 03001318
- Added to NRHP: December 24, 2003

T.C. Steele Boyhood Home, also known as the T.C. Steele House, is a historic home located at Waveland, Indiana. It was built about 1852, and is a 1 1/2-story, three-bay, Greek Revival style frame dwelling with a front-gable roof. The house was renovated and enlarged between 1895 and 1902. It was partially restored in 2002. Restoration was completed in 2014 and the home now operates as a privately owned, no cost retreat for artists and historic preservationists. It was the boyhood home of noted Indiana impressionist artist T.C. Steele (1847–1926).

It was listed on the National Register of Historic Places in 2003. Current programming for the location includes plein air paint outs, annual family reunions, artist mentoring weekends, school field trips, and public tours by appointment.
