= Beckville, Indiana =

- Unincorporated community
- Location in Montgomery County
- Coordinates: 40°00′38″N 86°42′35″W
- Country: United States
- State: Indiana
- County: Montgomery
- Township: Walnut
- Elevation: 889 ft (271 m)
- Time zone: UTC-5 (Eastern (EST))
  - Summer (DST): UTC-4 (EDT)
- ZIP code: 47933
- Area code: 765
- GNIS feature ID: 430695

Beckville is an unincorporated community in Walnut Township, Montgomery County, in the U.S. state of Indiana.

== History ==
Beckville was founded in 1828. The community was named for Solomon Beck, the original owner of the town site. A post office was established at Beckville in 1854, and remained in operation until it was discontinued in 1865.
