= Lapland, Indiana =

- Unincorporated community
- Location in Montgomery County Lapland (Indiana)
- Coordinates: 39°54′18″N 86°54′10″W
- Country: United States
- State: Indiana
- County: Montgomery
- Township: Scott
- Elevation: 840 ft (260 m)
- Time zone: UTC-5 (Eastern (EST))
  - Summer (DST): UTC-4 (EDT)
- ZIP code: 47954
- Area code: 765
- FIPS code: 18-42240
- GNIS feature ID: 437629

Lapland is an unincorporated community in Scott Township, Montgomery County, in the U.S. state of Indiana.

== History ==
Lapland was platted by William Davis in 1887. The community was probably named after Lapland, in Scandinavia. A post office was established at Lapland in 1885, which remained in operation until its discontinuation in 1899.
