= Crawfordsville Community School Corporation =

School district in Indiana

Address
- 1000 Fairview Ave Crawfordsville, Montgomery, Indiana, 47933; United States
- Coordinates: 40.045338°N 86.889442°W

District information
- Type: Public
- Grades: Pre-K through 12
- President: Steven McLaughlin
- Vice-president: Kathy Brown
- Superintendent: Rex Ryker
- School board: 5 members
- Schools: 3 Elementary, 1 Middle, 1 High
- Budget: $33.79 million
- NCES District ID: 1802460

Students and staff
- Students: ~2530
- Teachers: 186
- Staff: 197
- Student–teacher ratio: 13.61

Other information
- Website: www.cville.k12.in.us

Crawfordsville Community School Corporation (CCSC), also known as Crawfordsville Community Schools, is a school district headquartered in Crawfordsville, Indiana.

== Schools ==
Secondary schools:

- Crawfordsville High School
- Crawfordsville Middle School

Elementary schools:

- Hose Elementary School
- Hoover Elementary School
- Nicholson Elementary School

== See also ==
Montgomery County school districts:

- North Montgomery School Corporation
- South Montgomery Community School Corporation
