= Smartsburg, Indiana =

- Unincorporated community
- Location in Montgomery County
- Coordinates: 40°02′49″N 86°49′43″W
- Country: United States
- State: Indiana
- County: Montgomery
- Township: Union
- Elevation: 817 ft (249 m)
- Time zone: UTC-5 (Eastern (EST))
  - Summer (DST): UTC-4 (EDT)
- ZIP code: 47933
- Area code: 765
- FIPS code: 18-70092
- GNIS feature ID: 449731

Smartsburg is an unincorporated community in Union Township, Montgomery County, in the U.S. state of Indiana.

== History ==
A post office was established at Smartsburg in 1886, and remained in operation until it was discontinued in 1899. The community is said to be named either for the smartweed in the area or a member of the local Smart family.

== See also ==
- Smartsville, California
