= North Union, Indiana =

- Unincorporated community
- Location in Montgomery County
- Coordinates: 39°57′56″N 86°54′12″W
- Country: United States
- State: Indiana
- County: Montgomery
- Township: Union
- Elevation: 814 ft (248 m)
- Time zone: UTC-5 (Eastern (EST))
  - Summer (DST): UTC-4 (EDT)
- ZIP code: 47933
- Area code: 765
- GNIS feature ID: 440302

North Union is an unincorporated community in Union Township, Montgomery County, in the U.S. state of Indiana.

== History ==
A post office was established at North Union in 1871, and remained in operation until it was discontinued in 1899.
