= Garfield, Indiana =

- Unincorporated community
- Location in Montgomery County
- Coordinates: 40°04′59″N 86°49′26″W
- Country: United States
- State: Indiana
- County: Montgomery
- Township: Union
- Elevation: 797 ft (243 m)
- Time zone: UTC-5 (Eastern (EST))
  - Summer (DST): UTC-4 (EDT)
- ZIP code: 47933
- Area code: 765
- FIPS code: 18-26375
- GNIS feature ID: 434956

Garfield is an unincorporated community in Union Township, Montgomery County, in the U.S. state of Indiana.

== History ==
A post office was established at Garfield in 1880, and remained in operation until 1907. The community was named after James A. Garfield (1831–1881), 20th President of the United States.

== Education ==
Residents are zoned to North Montgomery Community School Corporation schools. Elementary students are zoned to Sugar Creek Elementary School. Secondary students attend Northridge Middle School and North Montgomery High School.
