= George Seybold House =

Historic house in Indiana, United States

- U.S. National Register of Historic Places
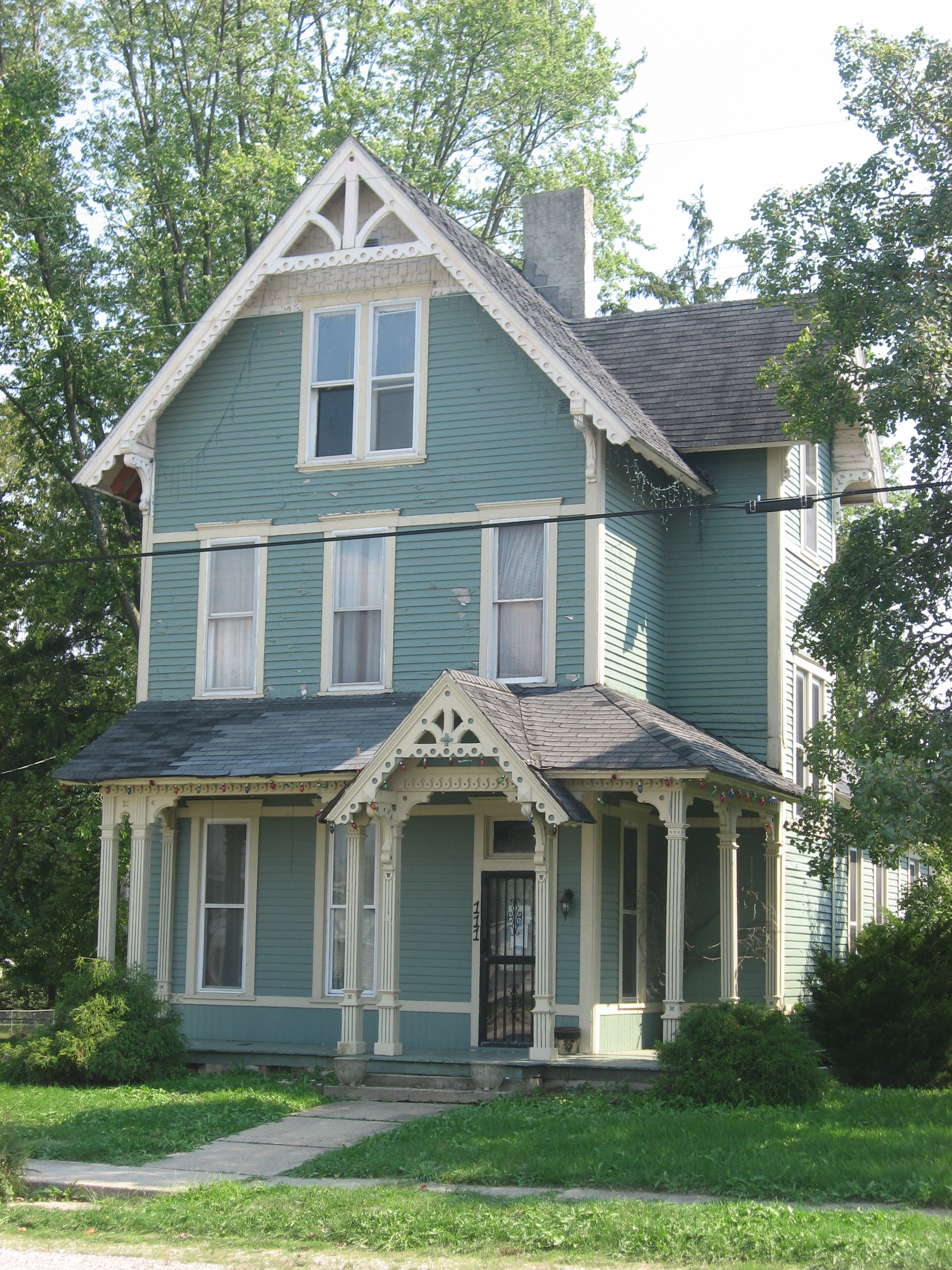
- George Seybold House, August 2012

- Location within Indiana Location within the United States
- Location: 111 E. Main St., Waveland, Indiana
- Coordinates: 39°52′33″N 87°2′40″W
- Area: less than one acre
- Built: 1886
- Architect: Palliser, Palliser & Co.
- Architectural style: Stick/eastlake
- NRHP reference No.: 02001172
- Added to NRHP: October 16, 2002

George Seybold House, also known as the Fred W. Kelley House, is a historic home located at Waveland, Indiana. It was built in 1886 and is a three-story, Stick style frame dwelling with a 1½-story rear wing. The building features embellished gable ends with decorative vergeboards, king post trusses, and brackets.

It was listed on the National Register of Historic Places in 2002.
