= Balhinch, Indiana =

- Unincorporated community
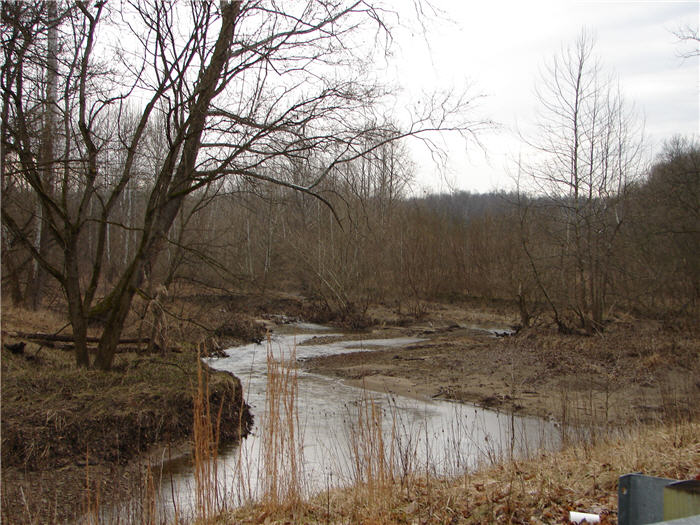
- Offield Creek in Balhinch

- Location in Montgomery County
- Coordinates: 39°59′40″N 86°59′14″W
- Country: United States
- State: Indiana
- County: Montgomery
- Township: Union
- Settled: February 1821

Area
  - Total: 2 sq mi (5.2 km^{2})
- Elevation: 620 ft (190 m)
- Time zone: UTC-5 (Eastern (EST))
  - Summer (DST): UTC-4 (EDT)
- ZIP Code: 47933
- Area code: 765

Balhinch is two-mile-square unincorporated community in Union Township, Montgomery County, in the U.S. state of Indiana. Balhinch includes Rattlesnake Canyon and Weir Cemetery.

== History ==
The Balhinch area was originally settled by William Offield in February 1821, five miles southwest of Crawfordsville in Section 21 in an area with two streams — Sugar Creek and Rattlesnake Creek. A monument to William Offield stands near Rattlesnake Creek.

It was formally platted in the 1920s and the boundaries legally defined.

== Notable person ==
- Caroline Virginia Krout, author

== Gallery ==
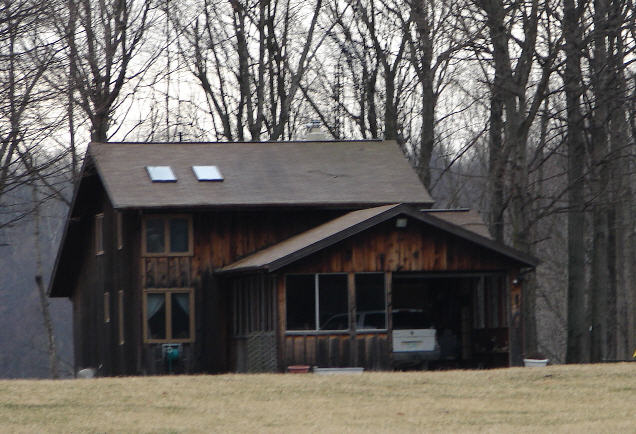
Residence in Balhinch

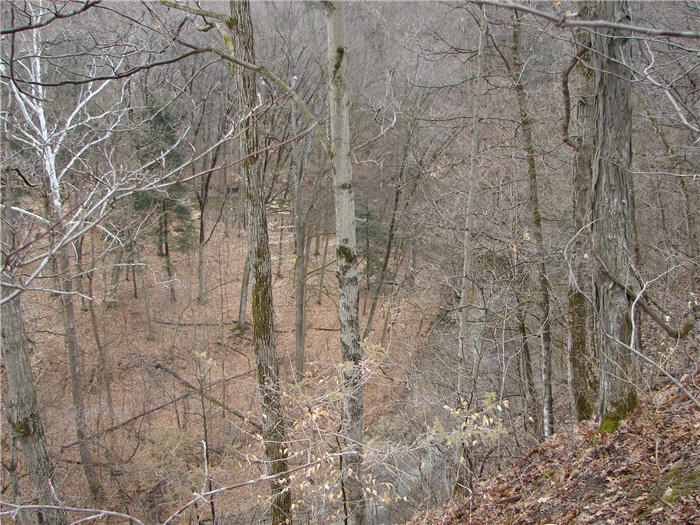
Rattlesnake Canyon

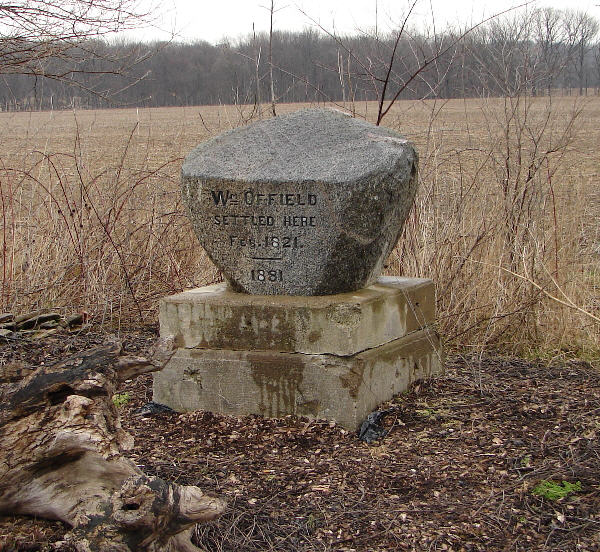
Offield Monument on road near creek
