= Lake Holiday, Indiana =

- Census-designated place
- Location in Montgomery County, Indiana

- Location in Montgomery County
- Coordinates: 39°57′51″N 86°57′38″W
- Country: United States
- State: Indiana
- County: Montgomery
- Township: Union

Area
  - Total: 2.78 sq mi (7.20 km^{2})
  - Land: 2.59 sq mi (6.71 km^{2})
  - Water: 0.19 sq mi (0.49 km^{2})
- Elevation: 778 ft (237 m)

Population (2020)
  - Total: 921
  - Density: 355.7/sq mi (137.32/km^{2})
- Time zone: UTC-5 (Eastern (EST))
  - Summer (DST): UTC-4 (EDT)
- ZIP code: 47933 (Crawfordsville)
- Area code: 765
- GNIS feature ID: 2629867
- FIPS code: 18-41211

Lake Holiday is an unincorporated community and census-designated place (CDP) in Union Township, Montgomery County, in the U.S. state of Indiana. It is a private community on the banks of its eponymous body of water. As of the 2020 census, the community had a population of 921 residents and 1300 lots across 1,780 acres.

The community contains the subdivisions of Holiday Shores, Royal Hills, Imperial Woods, Wellington Villa, Cambridge Shores, Indian Hills, Sherwood Forest, and Seneca Hills.

== History ==
Many of the older houses in the community were built in the early 1960s, as was the dam that created Lake Holiday. In March 1993, the Montgomery County Circuit Court approved a district plan that reorganized the governance of the community into two major bodies:

· The Lake Holiday Conservancy District Board of Directors, which owns and is responsible for the lake, dam, boat ramps, parks, clubhouse, drainage, and maintenance building.

· The Board of the Lake Holiday Property Owners Association, which maintains the roads and is responsible for housing and lot developments. The Property Owners Association is a tax-exempt entity.

According to its website, the Lake Holiday area now "covers 750 acres, has 780 property owners, 369 homes, and 1,296 privately owned lots. The lake itself covers 150 acres and has an average depth of 10 feet with depths up to 20 feet near the dam. There are many miles of shoreline along the lake and approximately 16 miles of roadway."

The clubhouse hosts community breakfasts, regular card-playing events of a social nature, Easter egg hunts, and other seasonal activities. There is a crappie fishing tournament on the lake each May. In summer, bass fishing tournaments are held on Thursdays (weather permitting).

== Geography ==
Lake Holiday is in southwestern Montgomery County, 7 miles (11 km) southwest of Crawfordsville, the county seat. It is on the west side of Indiana State Road 47, between County Roads 400 W & 550 S., and is just west of the town of New Market. Its offices are located in the lake's clubhouse at 5000 South 400 West, with a Crawfordsville mailing address.

The lake, community, and its various subdivisions are all located in Union Township. It should not be confused with the campground of the same name.

According to the U.S. Census Bureau, the Lake Holiday CDP has a total area of 2.78 square miles (7.20 km^{2}), of which 2.59 square miles (6.71 km^{2}) are land, while 0.19 square miles (0.49 km^{2}), or 6.83% of the CDP area, are water. The lake's dam gives way to Karnes Creek, which flows west to Sugar Creek (Wabash River tributary) at the western edge of Union Township. Sugar Creek flows southwest to the Wabash River south of Newport.

== Demographics ==
Historical population
Census	Pop.	Note	%±
2010	910		—
2020	921		1.2%
U.S. Decennial Census

== Education ==
South Montgomery Community School Corporation, including Southmont Junior High School and Southmont High School, operates public schools serving Lake Holiday.
