= Parkersburg, Indiana =

- Unincorporated community
- Location in Montgomery County
- Coordinates: 39°52′24″N 86°54′10″W
- Country: United States
- State: Indiana
- County: Montgomery
- Township: Scott
- Elevation: 856 ft (261 m)
- Time zone: UTC-5 (Eastern (EST))
  - Summer (DST): UTC-4 (EDT)
- ZIP code: 47954
- Area code: 765
- FIPS code: 18-58014
- GNIS feature ID: 449705

Parkersburg is an unincorporated community in Scott Township, Montgomery County, in the U.S. state of Indiana.

== History ==
Parkersburg was platted by Thomas Arnett and Noble Welch in 1837. It was named for its first postmaster, Nathaniel Parker. A post office was established at Parkersburg in 1835, and remained in operation until it was discontinued in 1903.
