= Ashby (Ladoga, Indiana) =

Historic house in Indiana, United States

- U.S. National Register of Historic Places
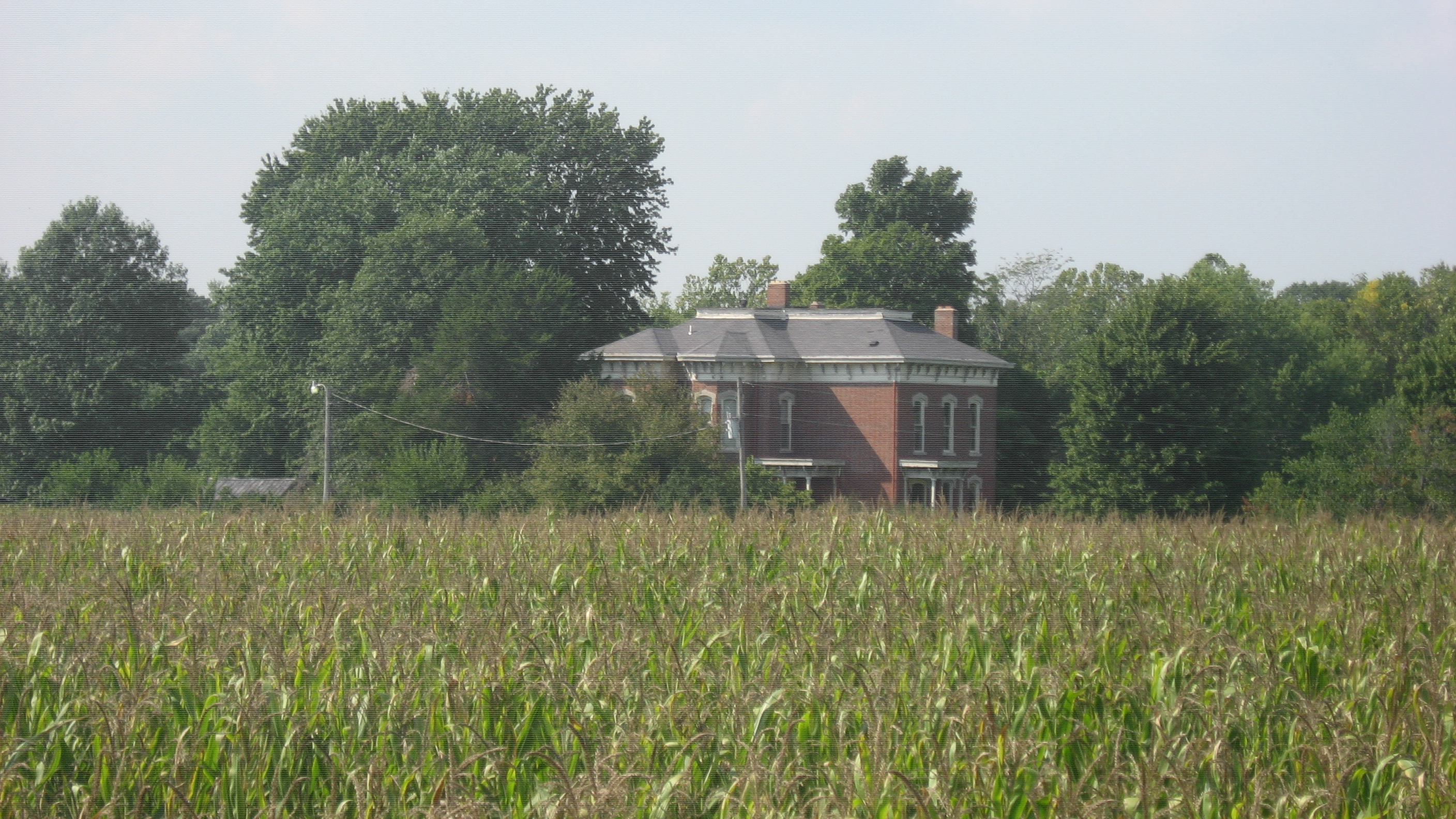
- Ashby, August 2012

- Location within Indiana Location within the United States
- Location: Southwest of Ladoga on County Road 350E, Scott Township, Montgomery County, Indiana
- Coordinates: 39°53′54″N 86°50′52″W
- Area: 4.5 acres (1.8 ha)
- Built: 1883
- Architectural style: Italianate
- NRHP reference No.: 80000029
- Added to NRHP: July 17, 1980

Ashby is a historic home located in Scott Township, Montgomery County, Indiana. It was built in 1883, and is a two-story, three-bay, L-shaped, Italianate style brick dwelling on a limestone foundation. It has a hipped roof, wood entrance portico, and arched double door entrance.

It was listed on the National Register of Historic Places in 1980.
