= Linnsburg, Indiana =

- Census-designated place
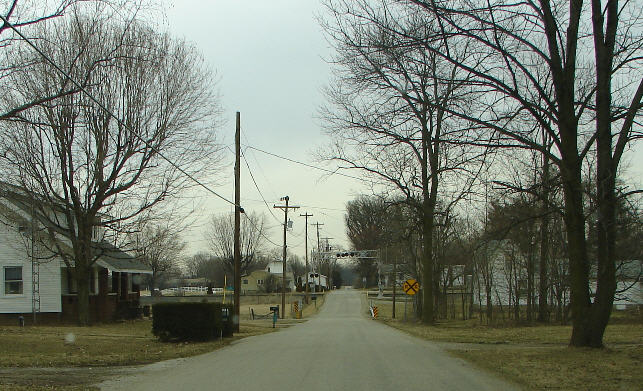

- Location in Montgomery County
- Coordinates: 40°00′01″N 86°47′50″W
- Country: United States
- State: Indiana
- County: Montgomery
- Township: Walnut

Area
  - Total: 0.38 sq mi (0.98 km^{2})
  - Land: 0.38 sq mi (0.98 km^{2})
  - Water: 0.0 sq mi (0 km^{2})
- Elevation: 843 ft (257 m)
- Time zone: UTC-5 (Eastern (EST))
  - Summer (DST): UTC-4 (EDT)
- ZIP code: 47933 (Crawfordsville
- Area code: 765
- GNIS feature ID: 2830468
- FIPS code: 18-44172

Linnsburg is a small unincorporated community and census-designated place (CDP) in Walnut Township, Montgomery County, in the U.S. state of Indiana. The town is a former whistle stop on the Monon branch and still has active rail service today from Nucor Steel to Avon.

== History ==
Linnsburg was platted by Susan McMullen in 1870. A post office was established at Linnsburg in 1887, and remained in operation until 1934.

In the early hours of May 13, 1995, an F-2 tornado struck this small community and killed two people as they slept in their beds. There was no warning. The storm damaged portions of Nucor Steel, Walnut Township Elementary School, and several homes and farms. Police officers and fire fighters from all around the county converged on the scene and spent hours digging through the rubble for survivors. This was part of a series of tornadoes that struck the Midwest.

== Geography ==
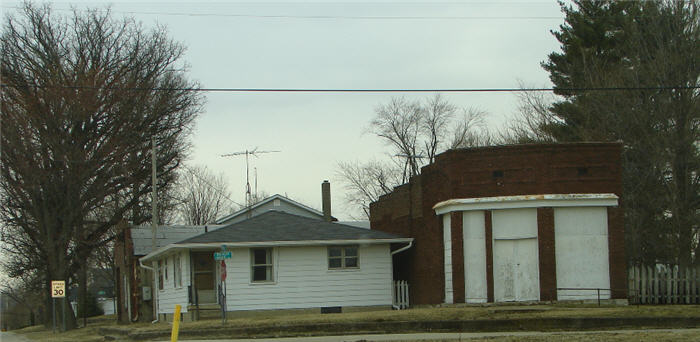
Buildings in Linnsburg

Linnsburg is located in eastern Montgomery County just south of Mace. It is 6 miles (10 km) southeast of Crawfordsville, the county seat, and 39 miles (63 km) northwest of downtown Indianapolis.

According to the U.S. Census Bureau, the Linnsburg CDP has an area of 0.38 square miles (0.98 km^{2}), all land.

== Demographics ==
The United States Census Bureau delineated Linnsburg as a census designated place in the 2022 American Community Survey.
