= Whitesville, Indiana =

- Unincorporated community
- Location in Montgomery County
- Coordinates: 39°57′55″N 86°50′01″W
- Country: United States
- State: Indiana
- County: Montgomery
- Township: Union
- Elevation: 873 ft (266 m)
- Time zone: UTC-5 (Eastern (EST))
  - Summer (DST): UTC-4 (EDT)
- ZIP code: 47968
- Area code: 765
- FIPS code: 18-84032
- GNIS feature ID: 445979

Whitesville is an unincorporated community in Union Township, Montgomery County, in the U.S. state of Indiana.

== History ==
A post office was established at Whitesville in 1852, and remained in operation until it was discontinued in 1919. Joseph S. White served as an early postmaster.
