= Mace, Indiana =

- Census-designated place
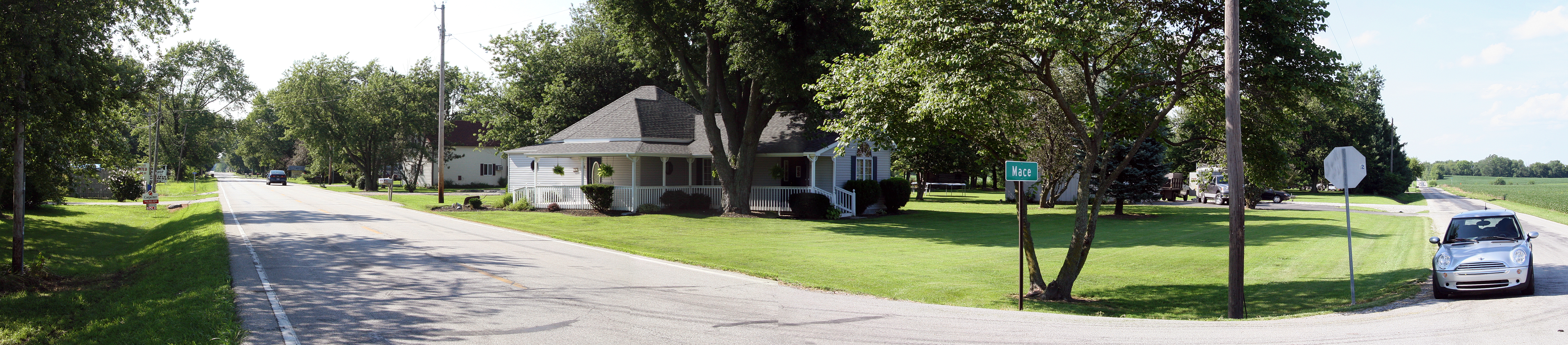
- Corner of Main Street and 600 East on the east side of Mace

- Location in Montgomery County
- Coordinates: 40°00′32″N 86°47′52″W
- Country: United States
- State: Indiana
- County: Montgomery
- Township: Walnut
- Established: area_footnotes =

Area
  - Total: 0.23 sq mi (0.60 km^{2})
  - Land: 0.23 sq mi (0.60 km^{2})
  - Water: 0.0 sq mi (0 km^{2})
- Elevation: 837 ft (255 m)
- Time zone: UTC-5 (Eastern (EST))
  - Summer (DST): UTC-4 (EDT)
- ZIP code: 47933 (Crawfordsville
- Area code: 765
- FIPS code: 18-45720
- GNIS feature ID: 2830469

Mace is an unincorporated community and census-designated place (CDP) in Walnut Township, Montgomery County, in the U.S. state of Indiana.

== History ==
Mace, formerly called "Fredericksburg", was laid out in about 1840 by Frederick Long. A post office was established at Mace in 1853, and remained in operation until it was discontinued in 1912.

== Geography ==
Mace is located in eastern Montgomery County. It is bordered to the south by Linnsburg. U.S. Route 136 passes through the community, leading northwest 6 miles (10 km) to Crawfordsville, the county seat, and southeast 10 miles (16 km) to Jamestown. Downtown Indianapolis is 39 miles (63 km) southeast of Mace.

According to the U.S. Census Bureau, the Mace CDP has an area of 0.23 square miles (0.60 km^{2}), all land. It is drained to the north by an unnamed tributary of the Walnut Fork of Sugar Creek, which flows northwest to Sugar Creek at Crawfordsville and is part of the Wabash River watershed.

== Demographics ==
The United States Census Bureau delineated Mace as a census designated place in the 2022 American Community Survey.

== Gallery ==
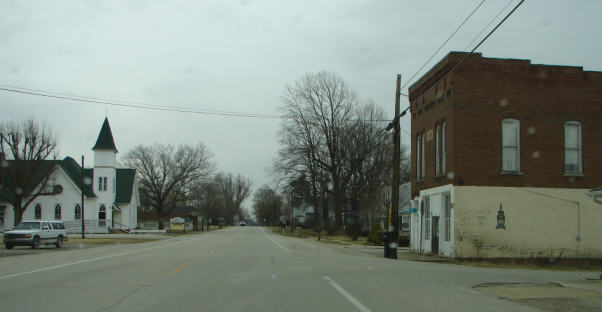
Looking east along U.S. Route 136 into Mace

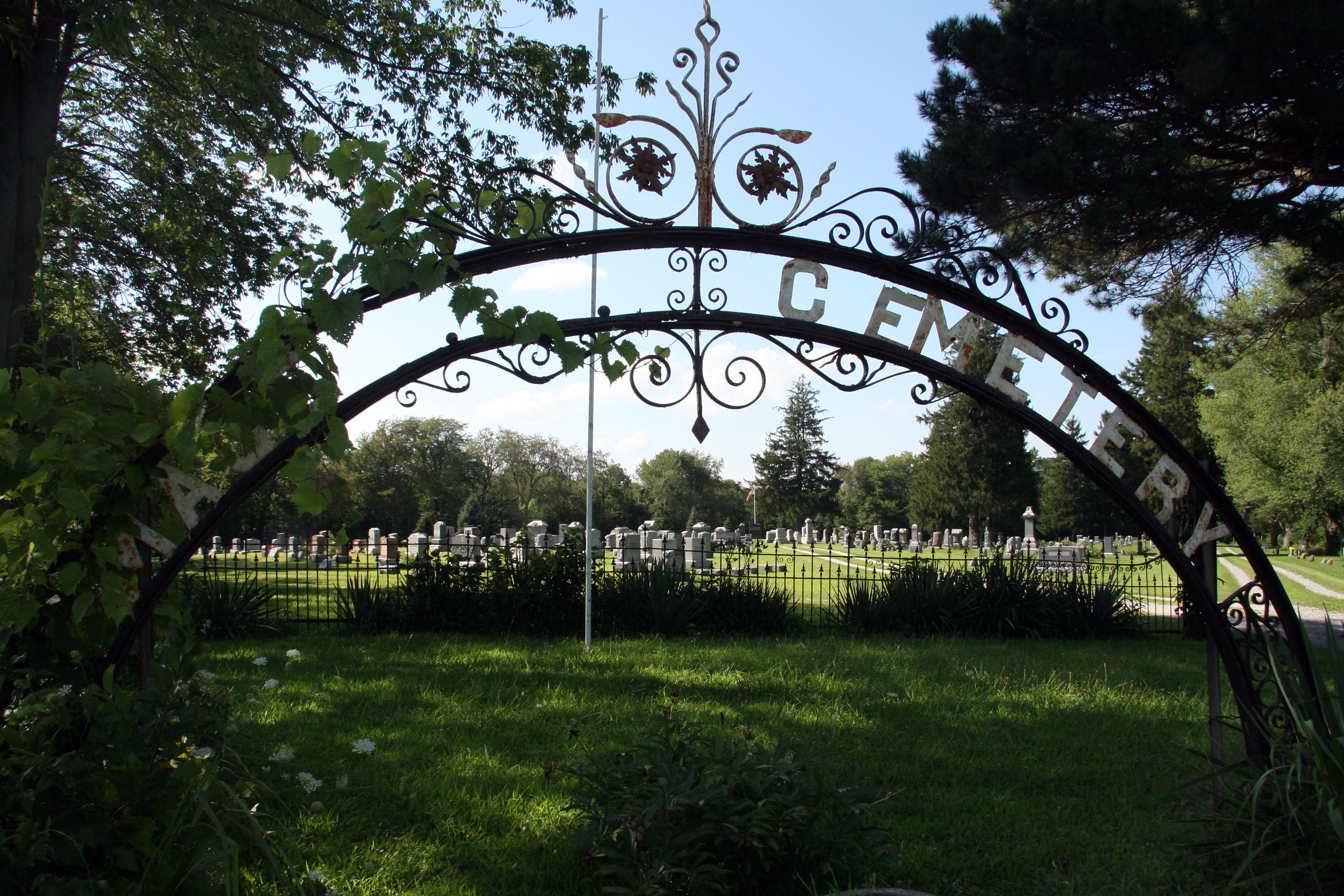
Mace Cemetery
