= William Offield =

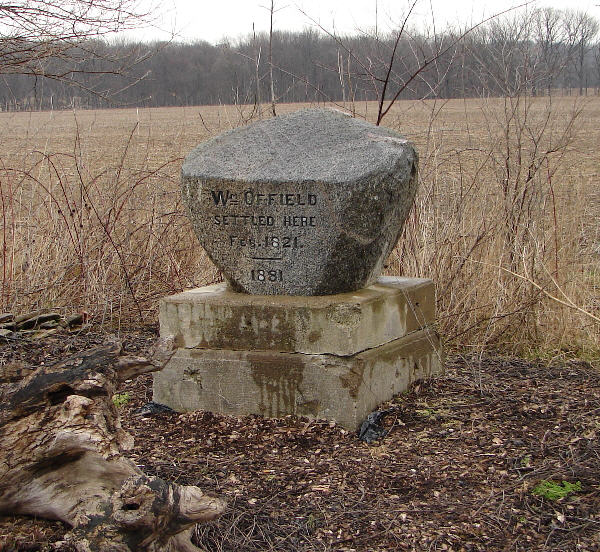
Offield Monument on road near Offield's creek.

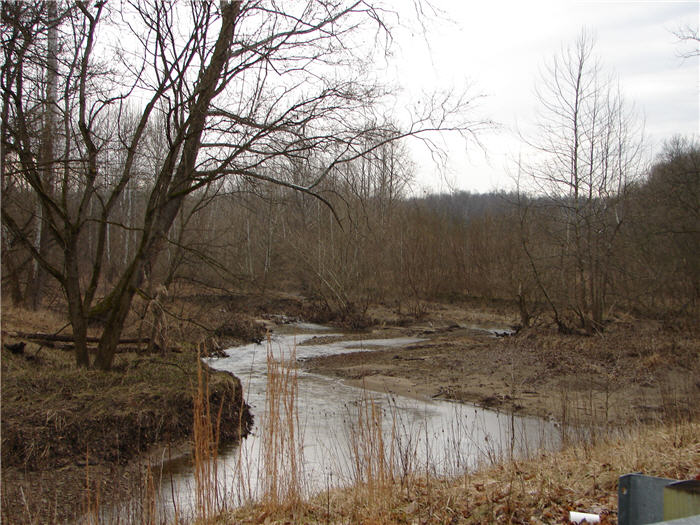
Offield's Creek

William Offield (March 24, 1793 – c. 1881) was an American pioneer.

In 1821, Offield built a cabin on a creek, (later known as Offield's Creek), four miles southwest of the future site of Crawfordsville, Indiana in an area now known as Balhinch. He and William Miller were the first two settlers in the area.

William Offield was born 24 Mar 1793 in Sullivan County, Tennessee and died about 1881 in Oregon, USA.

He was County Commissioner of Montgomery County from 1823 to 1824.

== Early travels ==
"In Feb. of that year [1821], according to well-authenticated tradition, William Offield with his wife and one child came from a settlement on White river, not far from the present town of Martinsville, in Morgan co., and settled a few rods from the mouth of the little stream which flows into Sugar creek, some 5 or 6 miles southwest of Crawfordsville, and which now bears the name Offield's creek.

His cabin, which was only 12 X 15 feet, was on the south side of Sec. 16, T. 18 N., R. 5W. Mr. Offield moved from the settlement on White river in a single wagon, in company with ... All except Mr. Offield stopped in Putnam Co. ... A son of John Sigler, named Andrew, accompanied Mr. Offield to Montgomery Co. for the purpose of taking back the wagon which the latter had borrowed from some one in the White river settlement to transport his household goods to his new home.

The whole country through which they traveled was covered with undergrowth, in some places so thick that Mr. Offield had to cut it out with his axe to enable the wagon to pass. In going down a steep hill Mr. Offield would construct a brake by cutting down a busy-topped sapling, making the butt-end fast to the hind axle of the wagon and leaving the top to drag on the ground."

== See also ==
- Balhinch, Indiana
