= Waveland, Indiana =

- Town
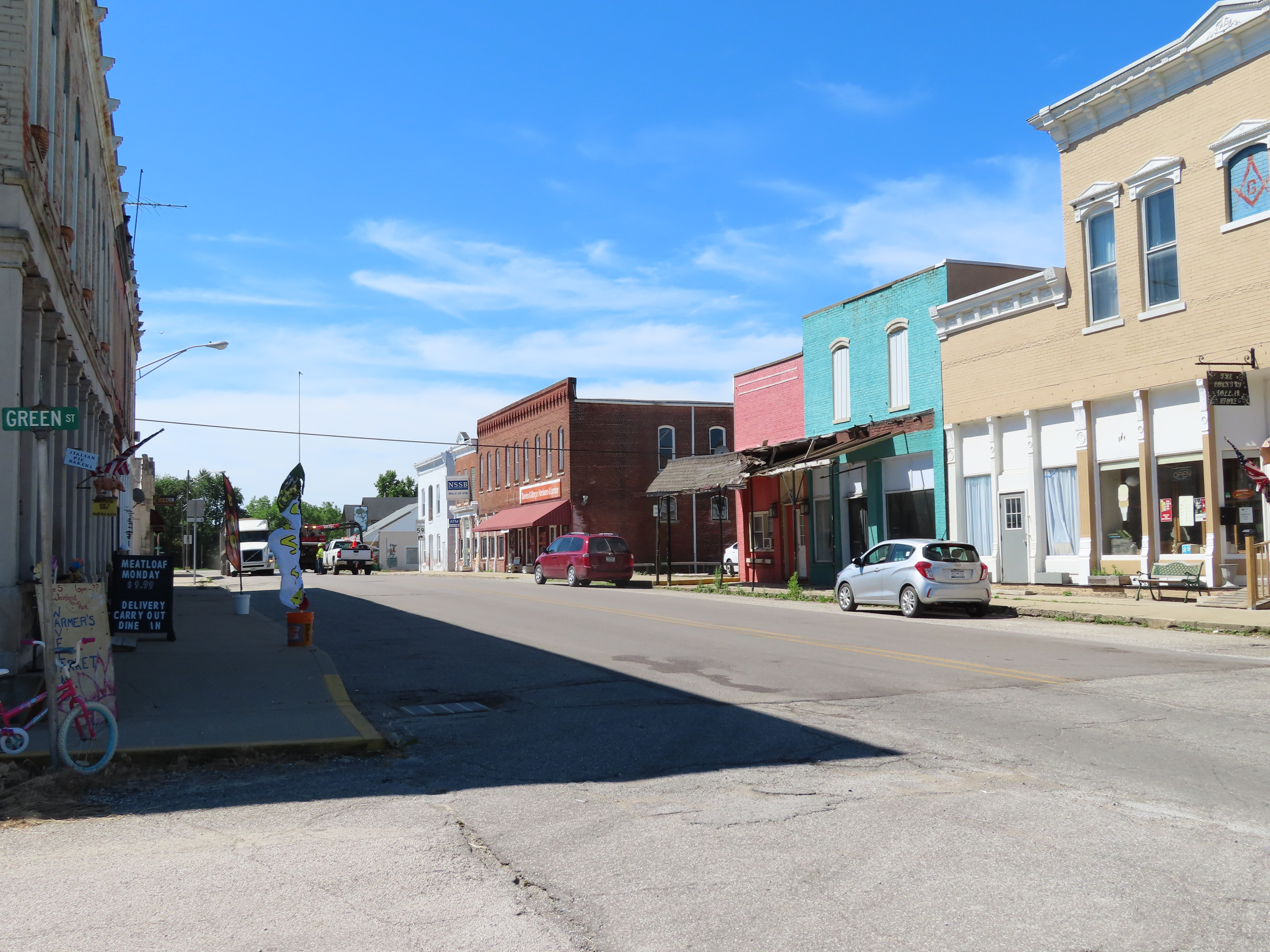

- Location in Montgomery County
- Coordinates: 39°52′35″N 87°02′48″W
- Country: United States
- State: Indiana
- County: Montgomery
- Township: Brown

Area
  - Total: 0.31 sq mi (0.80 km^{2})
  - Land: 0.31 sq mi (0.80 km^{2})
  - Water: 0 sq mi (0.00 km^{2})
- Elevation: 778 ft (237 m)

Population (2020)
  - Total: 427
  - Density: 1,384.6/sq mi (534.59/km^{2})
- Time zone: UTC-5 (Eastern (EST))
  - Summer (DST): UTC-4 (EDT)
- ZIP code: 47989
- Area code: 765
- FIPS code: 18-81458
- GNIS feature ID: 2397726

Waveland is a town in Brown Township, Montgomery County, in the U.S. state of Indiana. The population was 427 at the 2020 census.

== History ==
Waveland was platted by John Milligan in 1835. The settlement began as a resting place at a good spring between Terre Haute and Lafayette, Indiana. After a trading post and post office were established, Milligan developed the surrounding property. By 1850, the town had three general stores, three churches, two inns, two wagon shops and a blacksmith.

Waveland was the boyhood home of American Impressionist painter T. C. Steele. His parents, Samuel and Harriett, moved to Waveland when Steele was five years old, around 1852. Steele's father rented a saddle shop from John Milligan. Young Steele was enrolled in the Waveland Academy. The Presbyterian Church had recognized the need for higher learning in this community and provided a new brick building for the education of children. Steele family records show that, until 1870, they owned the cottage at 110 Cross Street in Waveland, built on one of Milligan's lots.

The George Seybold House and T.C. Steele Boyhood Home are listed on the National Register of Historic Places.

== Geography ==
Waveland is in southwestern Montgomery County. Indiana State Road 59 passes through the center of town as Main Street and Cross Street, ending at State Road 47 at the town's northern boundary. SR 47 leads northeast 15 miles (24 km) to Crawfordsville, the county seat, and west 10 miles (16 km) to its terminus at U.S. Route 41. SR 59 leads south 28 miles (45 km) to Brazil.

According to the U.S. Census Bureau, Waveland has a total area of 0.31 square miles (0.80 km^{2}), all land. Little Raccoon Creek runs along the northern edge of the town and flows southwest toward Big Raccoon Creek, a tributary of the Wabash River.

=== Climate ===
The climate in this area is characterized by hot, humid summers and generally mild to cool winters. According to the Köppen Climate Classification system, Waveland has a humid subtropical climate, abbreviated "Cfa" on climate maps.

== Demographics ==
Historical population
Census	Pop.	Note	%±
1880	592		—
1890	663		12.0%
1900	648		−2.3%
1910	676		4.3%
1920	590		−12.7%
1930	542		−8.1%
1940	530		−2.2%
1950	553		4.3%
1960	549		−0.7%
1970	557		1.5%
1980	559		0.4%
1990	474		−15.2%
2000	416		−12.2%
2010	420		1.0%
2020	427		1.7%
U.S. Decennial Census

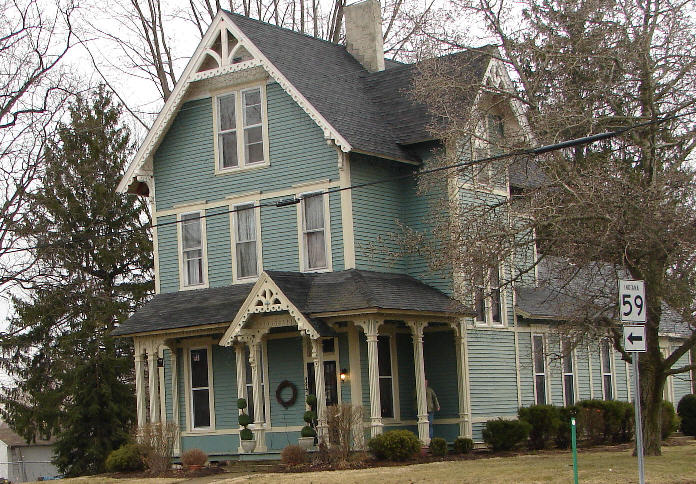
Victorian house in Waveland

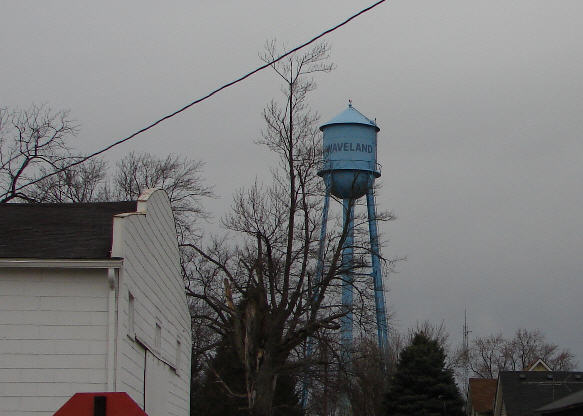
Water Tower

=== 2010 census ===
As of the census of 2010, there were 420 people, 169 households, and 118 families living in the town. The population density was 1,312.5 inhabitants per square mile (506.8/km^{2}). There were 202 housing units at an average density of 631.3 per square mile (243.7/km^{2}). The racial makeup of the town was 98.1% White, 0.2% Native American, and 1.7% from two or more races. Hispanic or Latino of any race were 2.6% of the population.

There were 169 households, of which 35.5% had children under the age of 18 living with them, 52.7% were married couples living together, 13.0% had a female householder with no husband present, 4.1% had a male householder with no wife present, and 30.2% were non-families. 24.9% of all households were made up of individuals, and 19.5% had someone living alone who was 65 years of age or older. The average household size was 2.49 and the average family size was 2.93.

The median age in the town was 36.8 years. 27.1% of residents were under the age of 18; 6.6% were between the ages of 18 and 24; 23.4% were from 25 to 44; 23.6% were from 45 to 64; and 19.3% were 65 years of age or older. The gender makeup of the town was 48.1% male and 51.9% female.

=== 2000 census ===
As of the census of 2000, there were 416 people, 168 households, and 115 families living in the town. The population density was 1,151.6 inhabitants per square mile (444.6/km^{2}). There were 194 housing units at an average density of 537.0 per square mile (207.3/km^{2}). The racial makeup of the town was 97.36% White, 2.16% from other races, and 0.48% from two or more races. Hispanic or Latino of any race were 1.44% of the population.

There were 168 households, out of which 34.5% had children under the age of 18 living with them, 56.5% were married couples living together, 5.4% had a female householder with no husband present, and 31.5% were non-families. 28.0% of all households were made up of individuals, and 16.1% had someone living alone who was 65 years of age or older. The average household size was 2.48 and the average family size was 3.01.

In the town, the population was spread out, with 26.4% under the age of 18, 7.7% from 18 to 24, 29.6% from 25 to 44, 18.0% from 45 to 64, and 18.3% who were 65 years of age or older. The median age was 36 years. For every 100 females, there were 98.1 males. For every 100 females age 18 and over, there were 91.3 males.

The median income for a household in the town was $43,036, and the median income for a family was $46,250. Males had a median income of $37,250 versus $23,125 for females. The per capita income for the town was $17,970. About 1.6% of families and 2.9% of the population were below the poverty line, including 6.0% of those under age 18 and none of those age 65 or over.

== Government ==
The town is governed by an elected five-chair town board which oversees the finances, ordinances, and other business of the town and park. The town clerk is also elected. The town employs a town marshal and his deputies who are responsible for law enforcement services in the town and at the lake and park outside of town known as "Lake Waveland" near the Parke/Montgomery County line.

== Education ==
South Montgomery Community School Corporation operates public schools serving Waveland. Southmont Junior High School and Southmont High School serve secondary students.

The town has a lending library, the Waveland-Brown Township Public Library.
