= Fiskville, Indiana =

- former incorporated town, now a neighbourhood of Crawfordsville
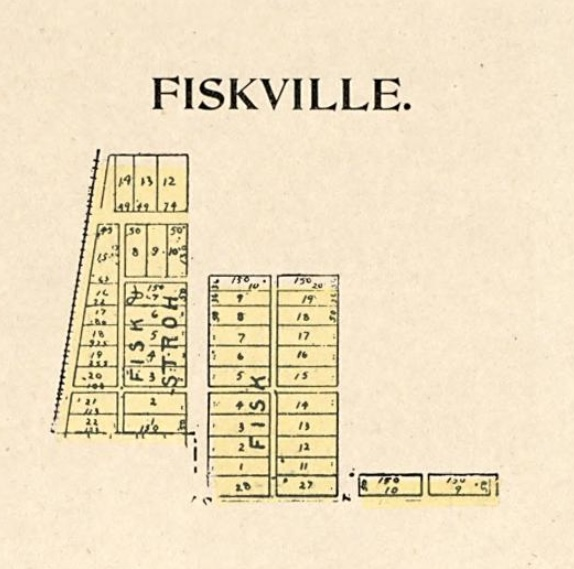
- Fiskville from 1898 county atlas

- Location in Montgomery County
- Coordinates: 40°02′55″N 86°53′41″W
- Country: United States
- State: Indiana
- County: Montgomery
- Township: Union
- Elevation: 748 ft (228 m)
- Time zone: UTC-5 (Eastern (EST))
  - Summer (DST): UTC-4 (EDT)
- ZIP code: 47933
- Area code: 765
- GNIS feature ID: 434535

Fiskville is a formerly incorporated town in Union Township, Montgomery County, in the U.S. state of Indiana.

It is located within the city limits of Crawfordsville. Fiskville was annexed by Crawfordsville in 1910.

The town was founded by a former court reporter named Charles H. Fiske. The push for Crawfordsville to annex adjoining communities including Fiskville, Longview, Highland, and others, dated back until at least 1890, with the argument being that census numbers were not truly reflecting Crawfordsville's true size.
