= Crawfordsville Regional Airport =

Airport in Crawfordsville, Indiana

- IATA: none; ICAO: KCFJ; FAA LID: CFJ

Summary
- Airport type: Public
- Owner: City of Crawfordsville
- Location: Crawfordsville, Indiana
- Elevation AMSL: 801 ft (244 m)
- Coordinates: 39°58′29″N 86°55′16″W
- Website: www.crawfordsville.net

Map
- Location of airport in Indiana CFJ (the United States)

Runways
Direction	Length		Surface
Direction	ft	m	Surface
5/23	5,506	1,678	Asphalt

Statistics
- Aircraft operations (2019): 22,922
- Based aircraft (2021): 19
- Source: Federal Aviation Administration

Crawfordsville Regional Airport (ICAO: KCFJ, FAA LID: CFJ) is a public use airport located 4 miles (6.4 km) south of the central business district of Crawfordsville, a city in Montgomery County, Indiana, United States. The airport was founded in June 1945 and is owned by the city. It is included in the Federal Aviation Administration (FAA) National Plan of Integrated Airport Systems for 2021–2025, in which it is categorized as a local general aviation facility.

== Facilities and aircraft ==
Crawfordsville Regional Airport covers an area of 279 acres (105 ha) at an elevation of 800.4 feet (244 m) above mean sea level. It has one runway: 5/23 is a 5,506 by 75 feet (1,678 X 23 m) asphalt runway with approved GPS and NDB approaches. The Crawfordsville NDB navaid, (CFJ) frequency 388 kHz, is located on the field.

For the 12-month period ending December 31, 2019, the airport had 22,922 aircraft operations, an average of 63 per day: 66% local general aviation and 34% transient general aviation. In November 2021, there were 19 aircraft based at this airport: 17 single-engine and 2 multi-engine.

== See also ==
- List of airports in Indiana
