= Caroline Virginia Krout =

United States author

Caroline Virginia Krout (c. 1852–1931) was an American writer.

She was born in Balhinch, near Crawfordsville, Indiana, in about 1852. She wrote several novels and a collection of short stories under the pen name Caroline Brown. In addition to being an author, she was a teacher at Crawfordsville High School and wrote articles for regional newspapers. She died in 1931.

== Family ==
Her older sister Mary Hannah Krout was also a noted author and journalist.

== Bibliography ==
- Bold Robin and His Forest Rangers. New York: E.P. Dutton, 1905.
- Dionis of the White Veil. Boston: L.C. Page, 1911.
- Knights in Fustian: A War-Time Story of Indiana. Boston: Houghton-Mifflin, 1900.
- On the We-a Trail: A Story of the Great Wilderness. New York: Grosset & Dunlap, 1903.
