= Montgomery County, Indiana =

County in Indiana, United States

- County
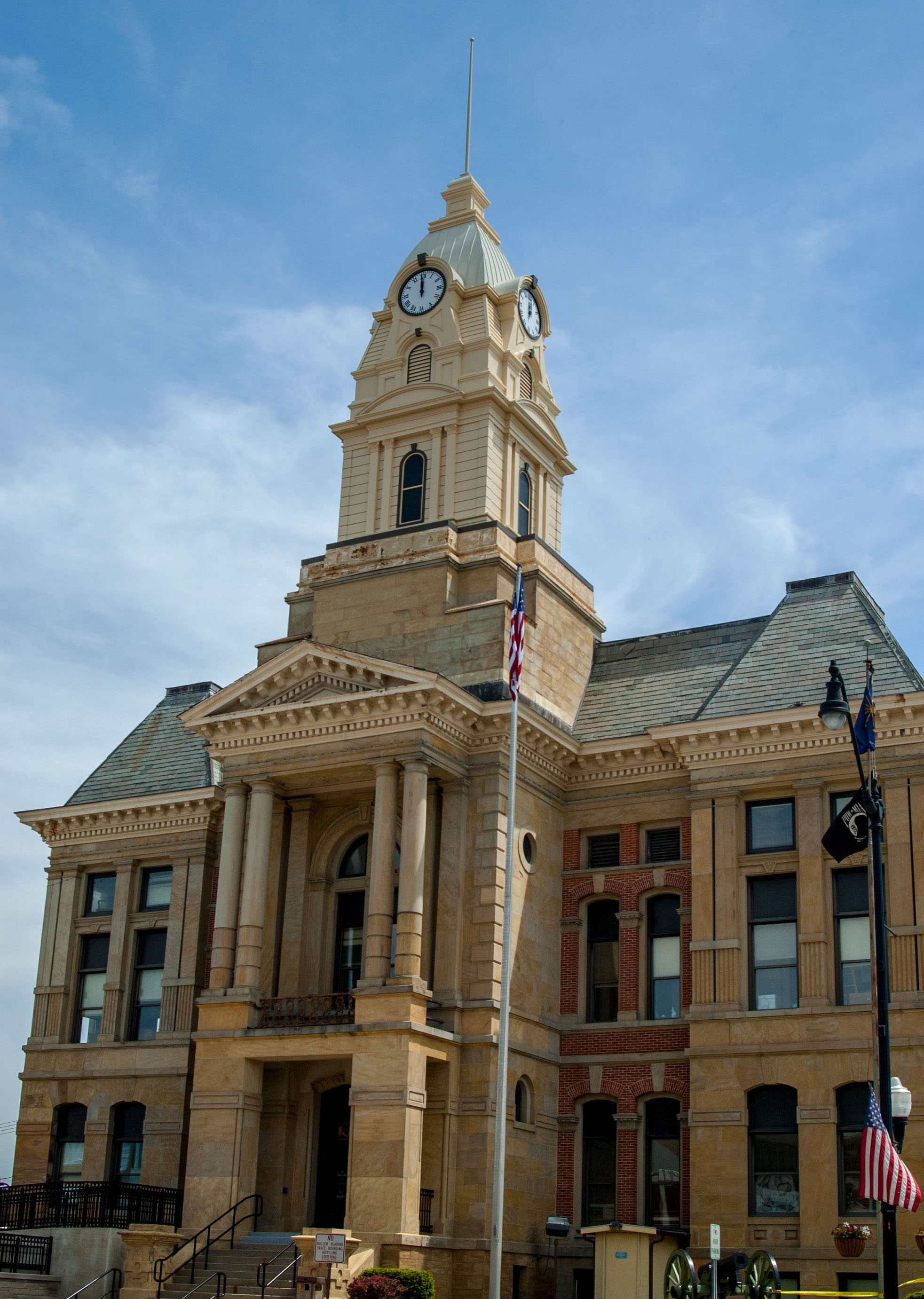
- County Courthouse in Crawfordsville

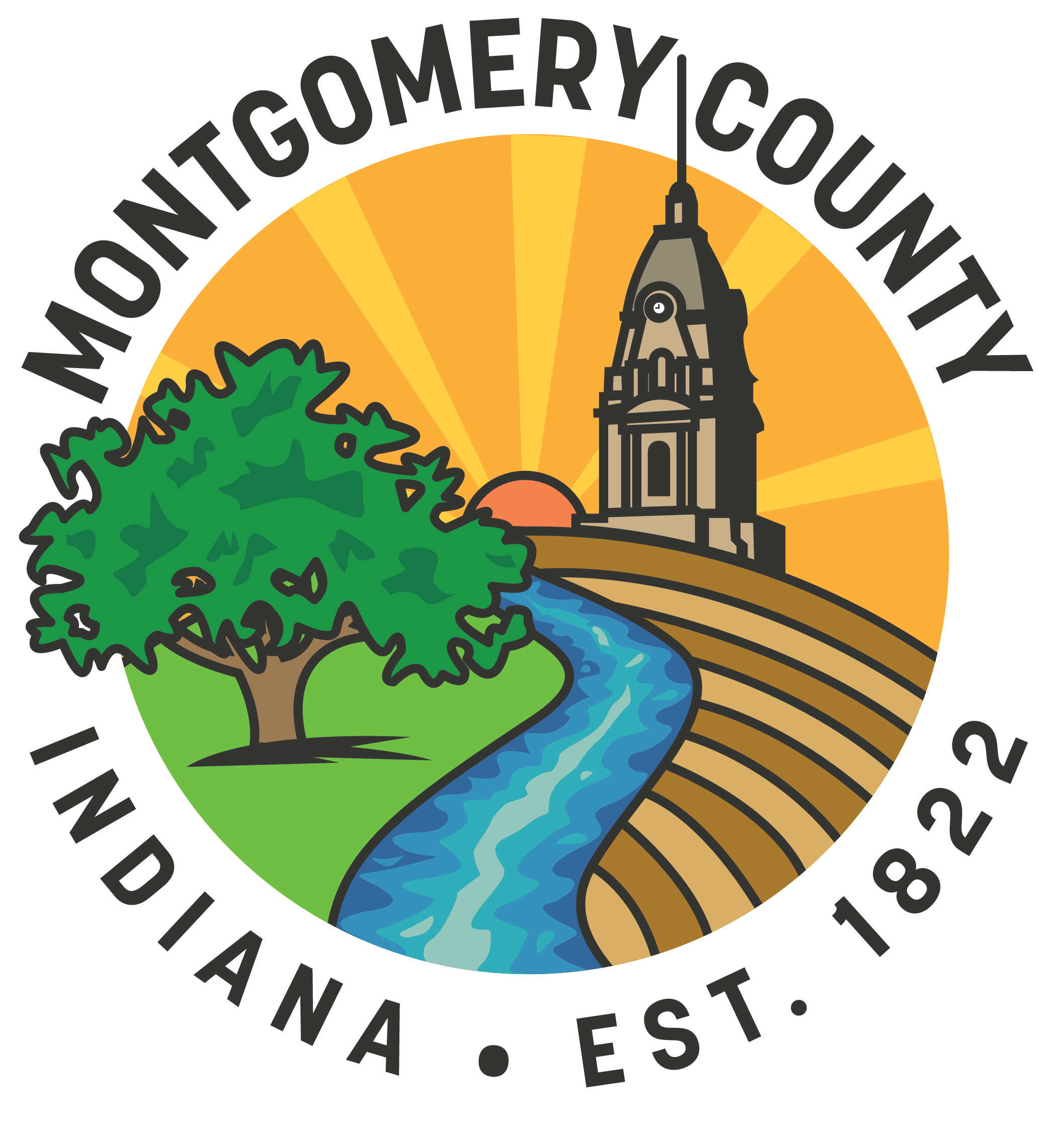
- Seal

- Location within the U.S. state of Indiana
- Coordinates: 40°02′N 86°53′W
- Country: United States
- State: Indiana
- Founded: December 21, 1822 (authorized); March 1, 1823 (organized)
- Named for: Richard Montgomery
- Seat: Crawfordsville
- Largest city: Crawfordsville

Area
  - Total: 505.44 sq mi (1,309.1 km^{2})
  - Land: 504.61 sq mi (1,306.9 km^{2})
  - Water: 0.83 sq mi (2.1 km^{2}) 0.16%

Population (2020)
  - Total: 37,936
  - Estimate (2025): 38,954 ▲
  - Density: 75.179/sq mi (29.027/km^{2})
- Time zone: UTC−5 (Eastern)
  - Summer (DST): UTC−4 (EDT)
- Congressional district: 4th
- Website: www.montgomerycounty.in.gov
- Indiana county number 54

Montgomery County is a county in the U.S. state of Indiana. As of the 2020 United States census, it had a population of 37,936. Its county seat is Crawfordsville. The county is divided into eleven townships which provide local services. Montgomery County comprises the Crawfordsville, IN Micropolitan Statistical Area.

== History ==
=== Early history and settlement ===
The earliest known inhabitants of the area that would become Montgomery County were the Mound Builders, Native Americans who built large earthen mounds, two of which were assumed to have been constructed in southeastern Franklin Township. However, research in the 1990s determined that those mounds were probably natural rather than human-made formations. Subsequent Native American tribes occupied the area until as late as 1832.

The first white settler in the area was William Offield, earlier of Tennessee, who arrived in 1821 with his wife Jennie (née Laughlin) and one child and settled near the confluence of Offield Creek and Sugar Creek, about five miles (8.0 km) southwest of present Crawfordsville. The first land in the county to be purchased from the government was a tract in Scott Township sold to John Loop on July 23, 1822; many more tracts were entered in subsequent months, most in Union Township. The area's settlers mostly came from Kentucky and Ohio, with others arriving from Tennessee, Virginia and the Carolinas.

Montgomery County was established by an act of the Indiana state legislature passed on December 21, 1822, which defined the county's boundaries and provided for the organization of its government. It was formed from parts of Wabash New Purchase attached to Parke and Putnam Counties. The county was named for Richard Montgomery, an American Revolutionary War general killed on December 31, 1775, while attempting to capture Quebec City in the Battle of Quebec. The first county election was held on March 1, 1823, with 61 voters participating to elect the first three county commissioners — William Offield, James Blevins and John McCollough — who then ordered that the first jail and courthouse be built.

Beginning on December 24, 1824, a large land sale was held for several days at the United States Land Office on Crawfordville's North Water Street, during which a large number of the area's tracts were sold at auction. The money raised from the sale, mostly in the form of gold and silver, was packed into kegs, hauled by wagon to Louisville, carried by boat up the Ohio River, and eventually to Washington, D.C. Settlement increased substantially during the subsequent year.

=== Courthouses ===
Montgomery County's first courthouse was ordered on June 28, 1823, to be made "of good hewed logs... to be twenty-six feet long; two stories high, lower story nine feet from floor to joist; upper to be seven feet to roof". Eliakam Ashton won the contract to construct the building on Crawfordville's Main Street; he finished it in August 1824 at a cost of $295. In 1825 a contract was issued to Henry Ristine to cut trees and pick up chips from under the courthouse so that "hogs would not find a comfortable place in which to make their beds".

A more substantial structure was ordered in 1831, the contract for its construction being awarded to John Hughes for $3,420. The result was completed in 1833, a two-story, 40x40 foot brick building surmounted by a cupola, later supplemented by separate one-story buildings erected to the north and east as wings of the main structure. The building stood on the current public square until 1875, when it was removed.

The third and current Montgomery County courthouse was the first courthouse designed by George W. Bunting of Indianapolis; it is one of six of his Indiana courthouses still standing. Bunting had served as a colonel in the Confederacy during the Civil War before establishing himself in Indianapolis; General Lew Wallace, who was on the Union side during the War and was a resident of Montgomery County, spoke at the dedication of the cornerstone in 1875. The building was constructed by McCormack and Sweeney of Columbus, Indiana at a cost of $150,000, and was completed in 1876.

The cornerstone contains an embedded copper box of memorable items, including the key to the old courthouse and a Henry VIII coin.

== Geography ==
The terrain of Montgomery County consists of low rolling hills, completely devoted to agriculture or municipal uses. It is drained by Sugar Creek, which runs toward the west-southwest through the center of the county. The county's highest point is the southeast county line below New Ross, at 930 ft (280 m) ASL. According to the 2010 census, the county has a total area of 505.44 square miles (1,309.1 km^{2}), of which 504.61 square miles (1,306.9 km^{2}) (or 99.84%) is land and 0.83 square miles (2.1 km^{2}) (or 0.16%) is water.

=== Adjacent counties ===
- Tippecanoe - north
- Clinton - northeast
- Boone - east
- Hendricks - southeast
- Putnam - south
- Parke - southwest
- Fountain - west

=== City ===
- Crawfordsville

=== Towns ===
- Alamo
- Darlington
- Ladoga
- Linden
- New Market
- New Richmond
- New Ross
- Waveland
- Waynetown
- Wingate

=== Census-designated place ===
- Lake Holiday

=== Other unincorporated places ===
- Balhinch
- Beckville
- Bowers
- Browns Valley
- Cherry Grove
- Deer's Mill
- Elmdale
- Fiskville
- Garfield
- Kirkpatrick
- Lapland
- Linnsburg
- Mace
- North Union
- Parkersburg
- Shannondale
- Smartsburg
- Taylor Corner
- Wesley
- Whitesville
- Yountsville

=== Extinct towns ===
- Binford
- Fredericksburg
- Troutman

=== Townships ===
- Brown
- Clark
- Coal Creek
- Franklin
- Madison
- Ripley
- Scott
- Sugar Creek
- Union
- Walnut
- Wayne

=== Protected areas ===
- Shades State Park (also in Parke and Fountain counties)

== Transportation ==
=== Major highways ===
- Interstate 74
- U.S. Route 136
- U.S. Route 231
- Indiana State Road 25
- Indiana State Road 32
- Indiana State Road 47
- Indiana State Road 55
- Indiana State Road 59
- Indiana State Road 234

=== Railroads ===
- CSX Transportation

=== Airport ===
- KCFJ - Crawfordsville Regional Airport

Montgomery County is served by the Crawfordsville Regional Airport (KCFJ). Located four miles south-southwest of Crawfordsville, the airport handles some 6400 annual operations, nearly all general aviation (some air taxi). The airport has a 4,504-foot asphalt runway with approved GPS and NDB approaches (Runway 4-22).

=== Bridges ===
Two historic covered bridges, the Darlington and the Deer's Mill, are in the county.

== Climate and weather ==
Crawfordsville, Indiana

Climate chart (precipitation, max. and min. temperature)
J	F	M	A	M	J	J	A	S	O	N	D
2.1 33 14	2 39 19	3.2 50 27	3.7 61 38	4.1 72 48	4.3 82 58	3.8 85 62	4 83 59	3.4 78 51	2.8 65 39	3.8 51 31	2.6 38 20
- █ Average max. and min. temperatures in °F
- █ Precipitation totals in inches
- Source: The Weather Channel
Metric conversion
J	F	M	A	M	J	J	A	S	O	N	D
53 1 −10	51 4 −7	80 10 −3	94 16 3	104 22 9	109 28 14	96 29 17	102 28 15	87 26 11	71 18 4	96 11 −1	67 3 −7
- █ Average max. and min. temperatures in °C
- █ Precipitation totals in mm

In recent years, average temperatures in Crawfordsville have ranged from a low of 14 °F (−10 °C) in January to a high of 85 °F (29 °C) in July, although a record low of −31 °F (−35 °C) was recorded in January 1994 and a record high of 102 °F (39 °C) was recorded in June 1988. Average monthly precipitation ranged from 2.02 inches (51 mm) in February to 4.28 inches (109 mm) in June.

== Government ==
Montgomery County Sheriff's Department

Jurisdictional structure
- Operations jurisdiction: Montgomery, Indiana, United States
- Legal jurisdiction: As per operations jurisdiction
- General nature: Local civilian police

Operational structure
- Agency executive: Mark Casteel, Sheriff

The county government is a constitutional body granted specific powers by the Constitution of Indiana and the Indiana Code. The county council, the legislative branch of the county government, controls spending and revenue collection. Representatives are elected from county districts. The council members serve four-year terms and are responsible for setting salaries, the annual budget and special spending. The council also has limited authority to impose local taxes, in the form of an income and property tax that is subject to state level approval, excise taxes and service taxes.

The executive body of the county is made of a board of commissioners. The commissioners are elected county-wide, in staggered four-year terms. One commissioner serves as president. The commissioners execute the county's legislative acts, collecting revenue and managing the county's government.

The county maintains a small claims court that can handle some civil cases. The judge on the court is elected to a term of four years and must be a member of the Indiana Bar Association. The judge is assisted by a constable who is elected to a four-year term. In some cases, court decisions can be appealed to the state level circuit court.

The county has other elected offices including sheriff, coroner, auditor, treasurer, recorder, surveyor and circuit court clerk. Each is elected to four-year terms. Members elected to county government positions are required to declare party affiliations and be residents of the county.

Each township has a trustee who administers rural fire protection and ambulance service, provides poor relief and manages cemetery care, among other duties. The trustee is assisted in these duties by a three-member township board. The trustees and board members are elected to four-year terms.

Montgomery County is part of Indiana's 4th congressional district; Indiana Senate district 23; and Indiana House of Representatives districts 28 and 41.

United States presidential election results for Montgomery County, Indiana
Year	Republican		Democratic		Third party(ies)	
Year	No.	%	No.	%	No.	%
1888	4,011	50.82%	3,763	47.68%	118	1.50%
1892	3,837	48.77%	3,841	48.82%	190	2.41%
1896	4,353	50.60%	4,183	48.62%	67	0.78%
1900	4,507	51.20%	4,102	46.60%	194	2.20%
1904	4,647	53.10%	3,747	42.82%	357	4.08%
1908	4,427	49.64%	4,227	47.39%	265	2.97%
1912	2,747	33.43%	3,821	46.51%	1,648	20.06%
1916	4,300	49.36%	4,107	47.15%	304	3.49%
1920	8,792	54.49%	7,159	44.37%	184	1.14%
1924	8,366	58.52%	5,708	39.93%	221	1.55%
1928	8,863	63.69%	4,960	35.64%	92	0.66%
1932	6,417	43.64%	8,077	54.93%	210	1.43%
1936	7,369	47.39%	8,053	51.79%	127	0.82%
1940	8,554	54.78%	6,994	44.79%	68	0.44%
1944	8,319	59.43%	5,620	40.15%	60	0.43%
1948	7,890	58.28%	5,492	40.57%	155	1.15%
1952	10,569	65.89%	5,386	33.58%	86	0.54%
1956	10,418	65.41%	5,443	34.17%	66	0.41%
1960	10,957	66.36%	5,477	33.17%	77	0.47%
1964	7,823	49.11%	8,042	50.48%	65	0.41%
1968	9,085	59.87%	4,752	31.31%	1,338	8.82%
1972	10,997	75.99%	3,431	23.71%	43	0.30%
1976	9,509	63.01%	5,320	35.25%	263	1.74%
1980	9,936	66.61%	4,158	27.87%	823	5.52%
1984	11,119	74.96%	3,626	24.44%	89	0.60%
1988	10,793	74.58%	3,623	25.03%	56	0.39%
1992	7,602	52.20%	3,371	23.15%	3,591	24.66%
1996	7,705	57.51%	3,825	28.55%	1,867	13.94%
2000	8,891	67.87%	3,899	29.76%	311	2.37%
2004	10,901	74.93%	3,536	24.31%	111	0.76%
2008	9,060	59.27%	6,013	39.34%	212	1.39%
2012	9,824	68.03%	4,271	29.58%	345	2.39%
2016	11,059	72.41%	3,362	22.01%	851	5.57%
2020	12,659	73.61%	4,213	24.50%	326	1.90%
2024	12,122	72.91%	4,134	24.86%	371	2.23%

== Education ==
=== K-12 schools ===
School districts include: Crawfordsville Community Schools, North Montgomery Community School Corporation, and South Montgomery Community School Corporation.

=== Libraries ===
Montgomery County is home to several Carnegie libraries. These libraries were built in the early 1900s by way of grants from Andrew Carnegie. All but one, the Crawfordsville District Public Library, is still in use today. The Crawfordsville Library was moved to a new location on South Washington Street in 2005 after the old building became too small for the growing collection. The old library building is now the home of the Carnegie Museum of Montgomery County, a museum dedicated to the history of Montgomery County. The other Carnegie libraries include the Waveland-Brown Township Public Library, the Darlington-Franklin Township Public Library, and the Linden-Madison Township Public Library. The Ladoga Clark Township Public Library is not housed in a Carnegie building.

== Demographics ==
Historical population
Census	Pop.	Note	%±
1830	7,317		—
1840	14,438		97.3%
1850	18,084		25.3%
1860	20,888		15.5%
1870	23,765		13.8%
1880	27,316		14.9%
1890	28,025		2.6%
1900	29,388		4.9%
1910	29,296		−0.3%
1920	28,490		−2.8%
1930	26,980		−5.3%
1940	27,231		0.9%
1950	29,122		6.9%
1960	32,089		10.2%
1970	33,930		5.7%
1980	35,501		4.6%
1990	34,436		−3.0%
2000	37,629		9.3%
2010	38,124		1.3%
2020	37,936		−0.5%
2025 (est.)	38,954	▲	2.7%
US Decennial Census; 1790-1960 1900-1990; 1990-2000 2010-2013

=== Racial and ethnic composition ===
Montgomery County, Indiana – Racial and ethnic composition Note: the US Census treats Hispanic/Latino as an ethnic category. This table excludes Latinos from the racial categories and assigns them to a separate category. Hispanics/Latinos may be of any race.
Race / Ethnicity (NH = Non-Hispanic)	Pop 1980	Pop 1990	Pop 2000	Pop 2010	Pop 2020	% 1980	% 1990	% 2000	% 2010	% 2020
White alone (NH)	35,128	33,873	36,223	35,374	33,748	98.95%	98.37%	96.26%	92.79%	88.96%
Black or African American alone (NH)	148	200	281	307	343	0.42%	0.58%	0.75%	0.81%	0.90%
Native American or Alaska Native alone (NH)	29	67	73	72	73	0.08%	0.19%	0.19%	0.19%	0.19%
Asian alone (NH)	46	129	158	209	236	0.13%	0.37%	0.42%	0.55%	0.62%
Native Hawaiian or Pacific Islander alone (NH)	x	x	9	6	13	x	x	0.02%	0.02%	0.03%
Other race alone (NH)	21	8	30	29	77	0.06%	0.02%	0.08%	0.08%	0.20%
Mixed race or Multiracial (NH)	x	x	244	388	1,165	x	x	0.65%	1.02%	3.07%
Hispanic or Latino (any race)	129	159	611	1,739	2,281	0.36%	0.46%	1.62%	4.56%	6.01%
Total	35,501	34,436	37,629	38,124	37,936	100.00%	100.00%	100.00%	100.00%	100.00%

=== 2020 census ===
As of the 2020 census, the county had a population of 37,936. The median age was 40.5 years. 23.0% of residents were under the age of 18 and 18.5% of residents were 65 years of age or older. For every 100 females there were 101.1 males, and for every 100 females age 18 and over there were 100.0 males age 18 and over.

The racial makeup of the county was 90.3% White, 0.9% Black or African American, 0.4% American Indian and Alaska Native, 0.6% Asian, <0.1% Native Hawaiian and Pacific Islander, 3.0% from some other race, and 4.7% from two or more races. Hispanic or Latino residents of any race comprised 6.0% of the population.

47.1% of residents lived in urban areas, while 52.9% lived in rural areas.

There were 15,210 households in the county, of which 29.8% had children under the age of 18 living in them. Of all households, 49.7% were married-couple households, 18.1% were households with a male householder and no spouse or partner present, and 23.6% were households with a female householder and no spouse or partner present. About 28.3% of all households were made up of individuals and 12.8% had someone living alone who was 65 years of age or older.

There were 16,464 housing units, of which 7.6% were vacant. Among occupied housing units, 73.8% were owner-occupied and 26.2% were renter-occupied. The homeowner vacancy rate was 1.5% and the rental vacancy rate was 7.9%.

=== 2010 census ===
As of the 2010 United States census, there were 38,124 people, 14,979 households, and 10,342 families in the county. The population density was 75.6 inhabitants per square mile (29.2/km^{2}). There were 16,535 housing units at an average density of 32.8 per square mile (12.7/km^{2}). The racial makeup of the county was 95.2% white, 0.9% black or African American, 0.6% Asian, 0.3% American Indian, 1.8% from other races, and 1.2% from two or more races. Those of Hispanic or Latino origin made up 4.6% of the population. In terms of ancestry, 22.6% were German, 16.5% were American, 14.4% were Irish, and 12.1% were English.

Of the 14,979 households, 33.0% had children under the age of 18 living with them, 53.2% were married couples living together, 10.4% had a female householder with no husband present, 31.0% were non-families, and 25.9% of all households were made up of individuals. The average household size was 2.47 and the average family size was 2.94. The median age was 39.4 years.

The median income for a household in the county was $47,697 and the median income for a family was $56,374. Males had a median income of $42,494 versus $30,280 for females. The per capita income for the county was $22,788. About 9.8% of families and 12.2% of the population were below the poverty line, including 19.7% of those under age 18 and 5.0% of those age 65 or over.

== See also ==
- National Register of Historic Places listings in Montgomery County, Indiana
