= Browns Valley, Indiana =

- Unincorporated community
- Location in Montgomery County
- Coordinates: 39°54′11″N 86°59′31″W
- Country: United States
- State: Indiana
- County: Montgomery
- Township: Brown
- Elevation: 807 ft (246 m)
- Time zone: UTC-5 (Eastern (EST))
  - Summer (DST): UTC-4 (EDT)
- ZIP code: 47989
- Area code: 765
- FIPS code: 18-08506
- GNIS feature ID: 431643

Browns Valley is an unincorporated community in Brown Township, Montgomery County, in the U.S. state of Indiana.

== History ==
Browns Valley was originally known as Brownsville, and under the latter name was platted in 1836 by Matthias VanCleave. The community was named after its location in Brown Township. A post office was established at Browns Valley in 1850, and remained in operation until it was discontinued in 1945.
