= Indiana State Road 47 =

State highway in west-central and central Indiana

State Road 47
- SR 47 highlighted in red

Route information
- Maintained by INDOT
- Length: 64.22 mi (103.35 km)

Major junctions
- South end: US 41 west of Turkey Run State Park
- US 231 at Crawfordsville; US 136 at Crawfordsville; I-74 at Crawfordsville; US 52 near Lebanon; I-65 near Lebanon; US 421 near Kirklin
- North end: SR 38 in Sheridan

Location
- Country: United States
- State: Indiana
- Counties: Hamilton; Boone; Montgomery; Parke

Highway system
- Indiana State Highway System; Interstate; US; State; Scenic
← SR 46	→ SR 48

State Road 47 in the U.S. state of Indiana is a state highway in west-central and central Indiana. Although State Road 47 is signed as a north–south highway, it runs more east–west.

== Route description ==
The southern terminus of State Road 47 is at U.S. Route 41 just west of Turkey Run State Park. Its northern terminus is in Sheridan at State Road 38. State Road 47 rolls gently through the farmland in Boone and eastern Montgomery Counties. In western Montgomery and Parke Counties, segments of the road contain moderate hills and curves, especially near Turkey Run State Park.

== History ==
State Road 47's initial segment ran northeast from U.S. Route 41 to Crawfordsville. The next segment ran east from Crawfordsville through Sheridan to U.S. Route 31. The portion of State Road 47 between Sheridan and U.S. Route 31 was later decommissioned.

== Major intersections ==
County	Location	mi	km	Destinations	Notes
Parke	Penn Township	0.00	0.00	US 41 – Terre Haute, Hammond	Southern terminus of SR 47
Montgomery	Waveland	10.38	16.70	SR 59 south – Brazil	Northern terminus of SR 59
Montgomery	Brown Township	15.43	24.83	SR 234	
Montgomery	Crawfordsville	23.36	37.59	SR 32 west – Perrysville	Southern end of SR 32 concurrency
Montgomery	Crawfordsville	23.59	37.96	US 231 south – Greencastle	Southern end of US 231 concurrency
Montgomery	Crawfordsville	24.78	39.88	US 136 west / US 231 north – Waynetown, Lafayette	Northern end of US 231 concurrency; Western end of US 136 concurrency
Montgomery	Crawfordsville	25.44	40.94	US 136 east – Speedway	Eastern end of US 136 concurrency
Montgomery	Crawfordsville	26.20	42.16	SR 32 east – Lebanon	Northern end of SR 32 concurrency
Boone	Thorntown	43.13	69.41	SR 75 south – Jamestown	Northern terminus of SR 75
Boone	Washington Township	45.70	73.55	US 52 – Lebanon, Lafayette	
Boone	Washington Township	48.03	77.30	I-65 – Indianapolis, Gary	Exit number 146 on I-65
Boone	Washington Township	49.87	80.26	SR 39 – Lebanon, Frankfort	
Boone	Marion Township	58.00	93.34	US 421 – Indianapolis, Frankfort	
Hamilton	Sheridan	64.22	103.35	SR 38 – Frankfort, Noblesville	Northern terminus of SR 47
1.000 mi = 1.609 km; 1.000 km = 0.621 mi: Concurrency terminus
