= South Montgomery Community School Corporation =

School administrative unit in Indiana, United States

Coordinates: 39°57′20.2″N 86°55′15.0″W

The South Montgomery Community School Corporation, often abbreviated SMCSC, administers a total of 5 schools, including 1 high school 1 middle school and 3 elementary schools south of Crawfordsville, Montgomery County, Indiana. Its administrative offices are at 300 North 3rd Street in New Market, Indiana.

The superintendent is Dr. Chad Cripe

Communities served include portions of Crawfordsville, Alamo, Ladoga, Lake Holiday, New Market, New Ross, and Waveland.

== Schools ==
=== High schools ===
- Southmont High School

=== Middle schools ===
- Southmont Jr. High School

=== Elementary schools ===
- Ladoga Elementary School
- New Market Elementary School
- Walnut Elementary School
