= Buffer stop =

Device to stop trains at end of track

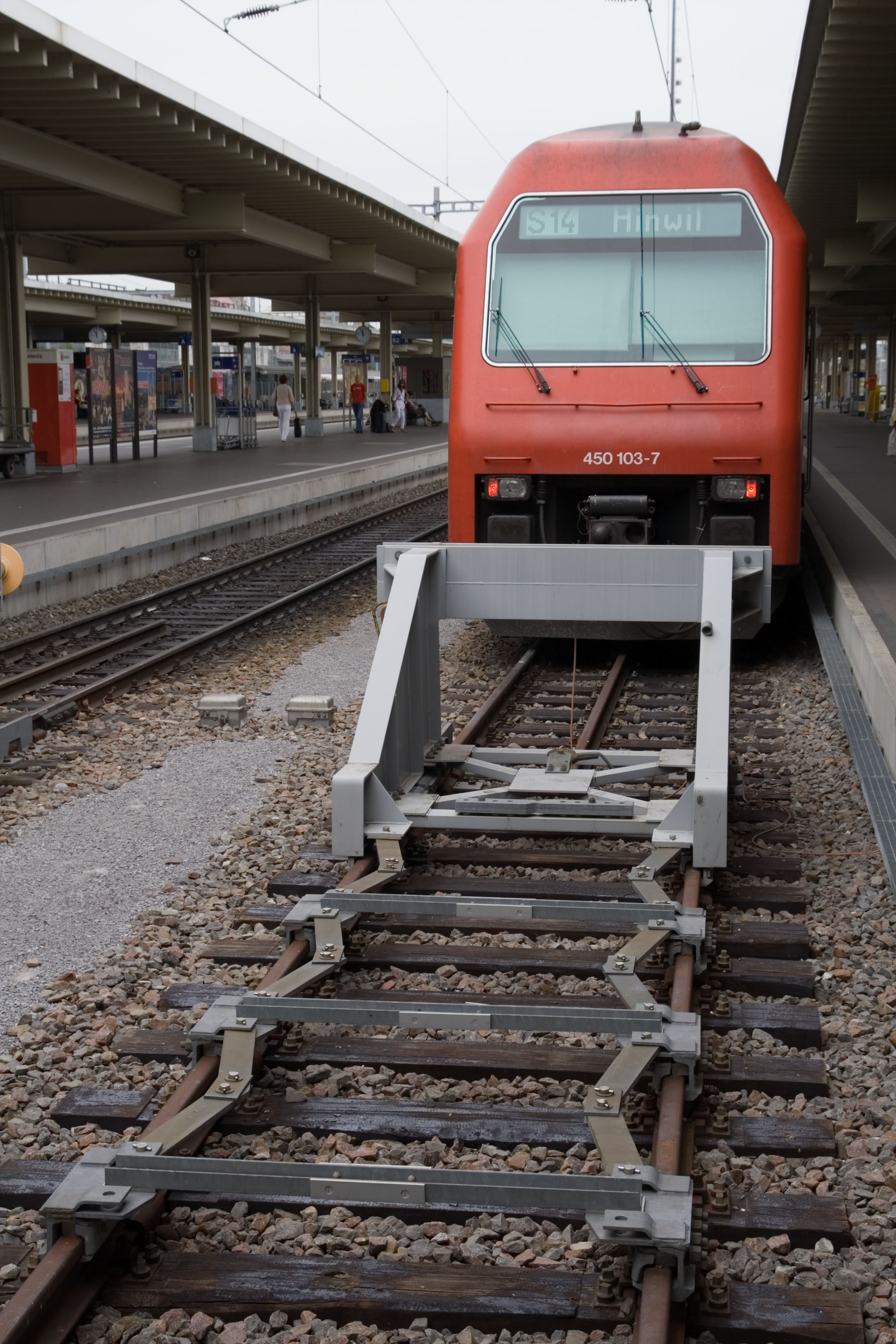
This buffer stop at Zürich Hauptbahnhof in Switzerland is designed to move up to 7 metres (23 ft) to slow down an 850-tonne (840-long-ton; 940-short-ton) passenger train from 15 km/h (9.3 mph) without damaging the train or injuring passengers.

A buffer stop, bumper, bumping post, bumper block or stopblock (US), is a device to prevent railway vehicles from going past the end of a physical section of track.

The design of the buffer stop is dependent, in part, on the kind of couplings that the railway uses, since the coupling gear is the first part of the vehicle that the buffer stop touches. The term "buffer stop" is of British origin, since railways in Britain principally use buffer-and-screw couplings between vehicles.

== Types ==
Several different types of buffer stop have been developed. They differ depending on the type of coupler used and on the intended application.

- Buffer stops with anticlimbers. These are particularly important for passenger railway applications, because the anticlimbers reduce the likelihood of telescoping of the railroad cars during a head-on impact.
- Buffer stops for a knuckle coupler or an SA3 coupler (centrally positioned between the two rails)
- Buffer stops with traditional "buffers" on either side
- Hydraulic buffer stops
- Friction buffer stops (bolted down to the rail)

If there is extra room behind the bumper block, there is usually a sand or ballast drag that is designed to further retard a runaway train. One such accident occurred in 1975 on the London Underground system, when a Northern City Line train powered past the bumper block at Moorgate station.

=== Energy-absorbing ===
Largely because of its mass, a train transfers an enormous amount of kinetic energy in a collision with a buffer stop. Rigid buffers can safely cope only with very low-speed impacts. (i.e., nearly stationary). To improve stopping performance, a way of dissipating this energy is needed, through compression or friction. Following a buffer stop accident at Frankfurt am Main in 1902, the Rawie company developed a large range of energy-absorbing buffer stops. Similar hydraulic buffer stops were developed by Ransomes & Rapier in the UK.

==== Examples ====
- Raja Trains Depot in Tehran
  - Stopping speed: 20 km/h (12 mph)
  - Stopping distance: 20 m (66 ft).

=== Wheel stop ===
Wheel stops or car stops are used to stop small numbers of light vehicles at the end of level storage tracks or to chock individual railroad cars on shallow grades.

== Gallery ==
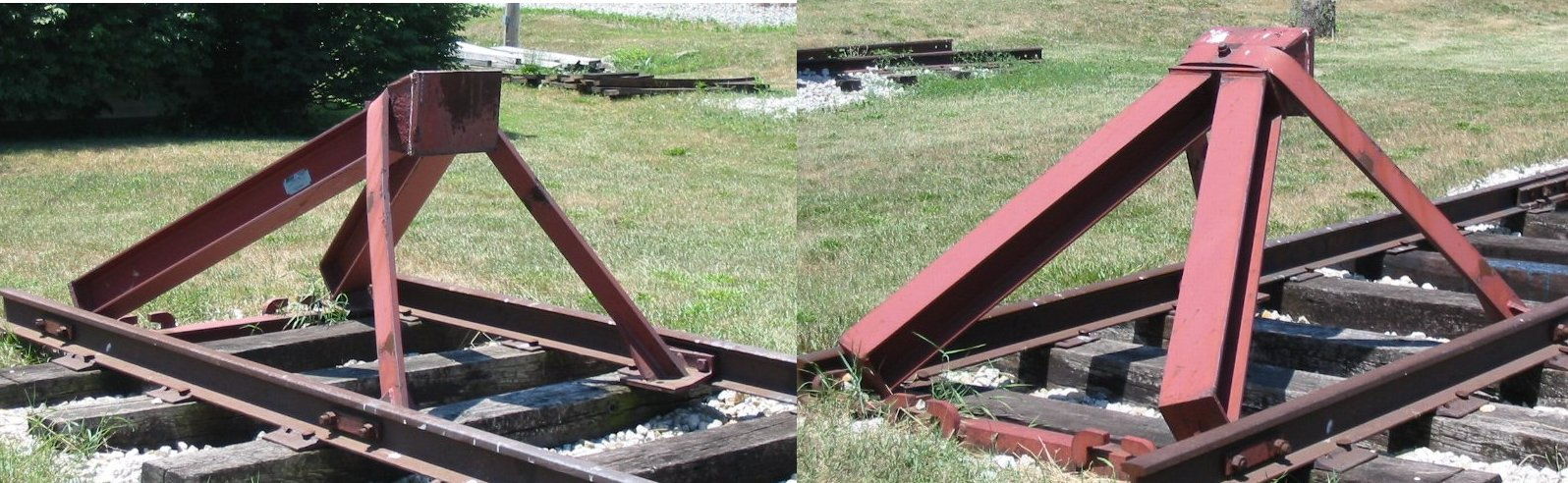
Two views of a Hayes-built bumper at the Linden Railroad Museum, Linden, Indiana. This design accommodates the AAR coupler.

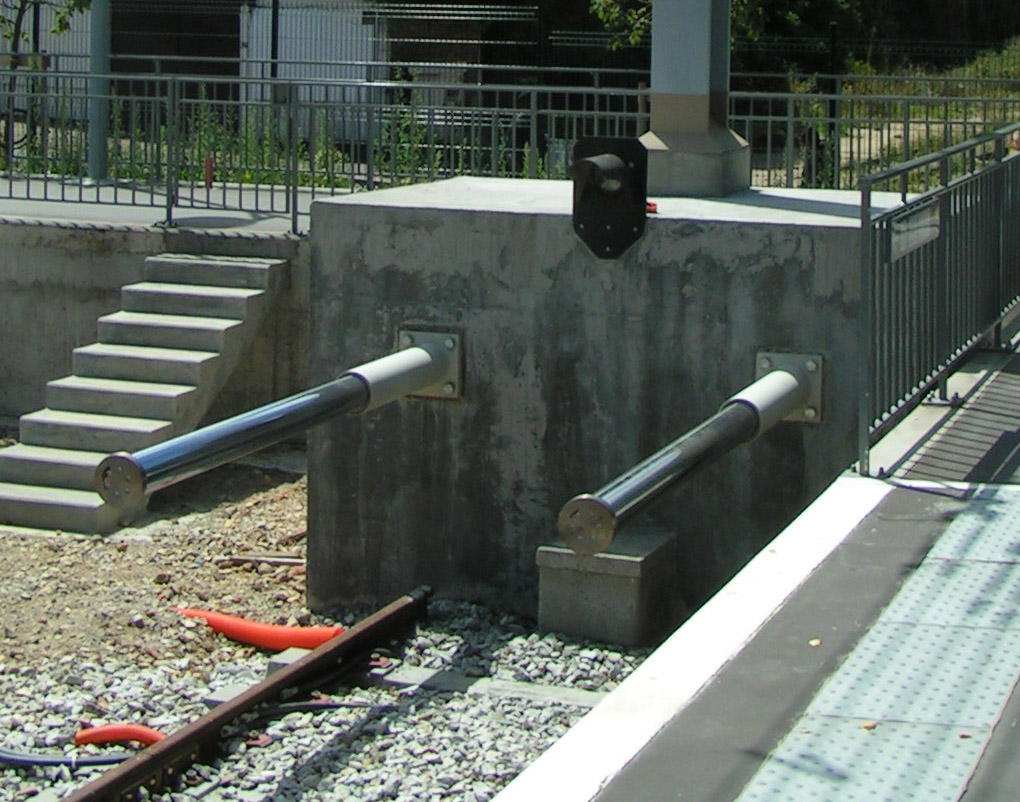
Energy-absorbing buffer stop in France

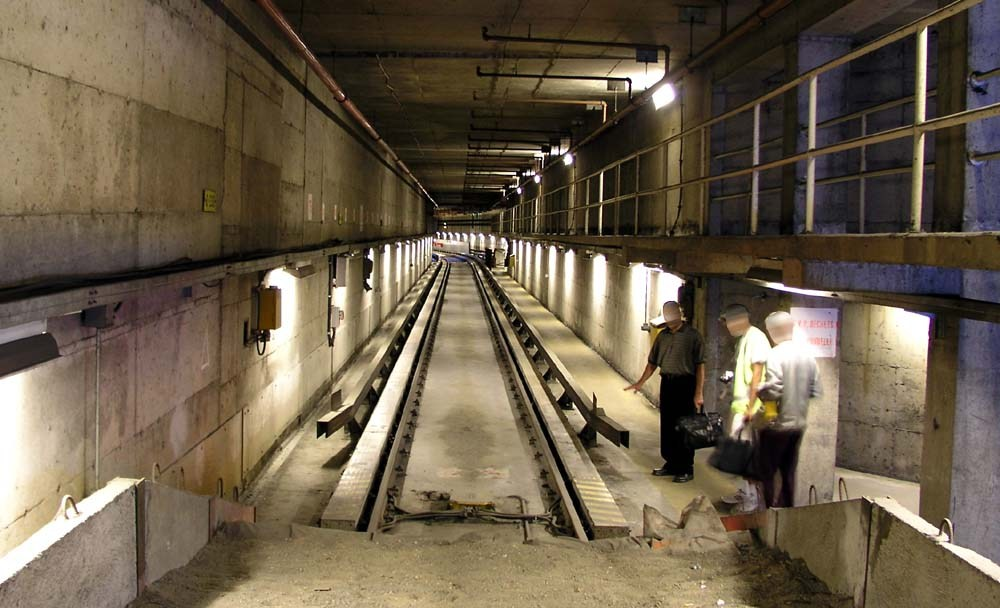
A buffer stop or sand drag on the Montreal Metro Honoré-Beaugrand station

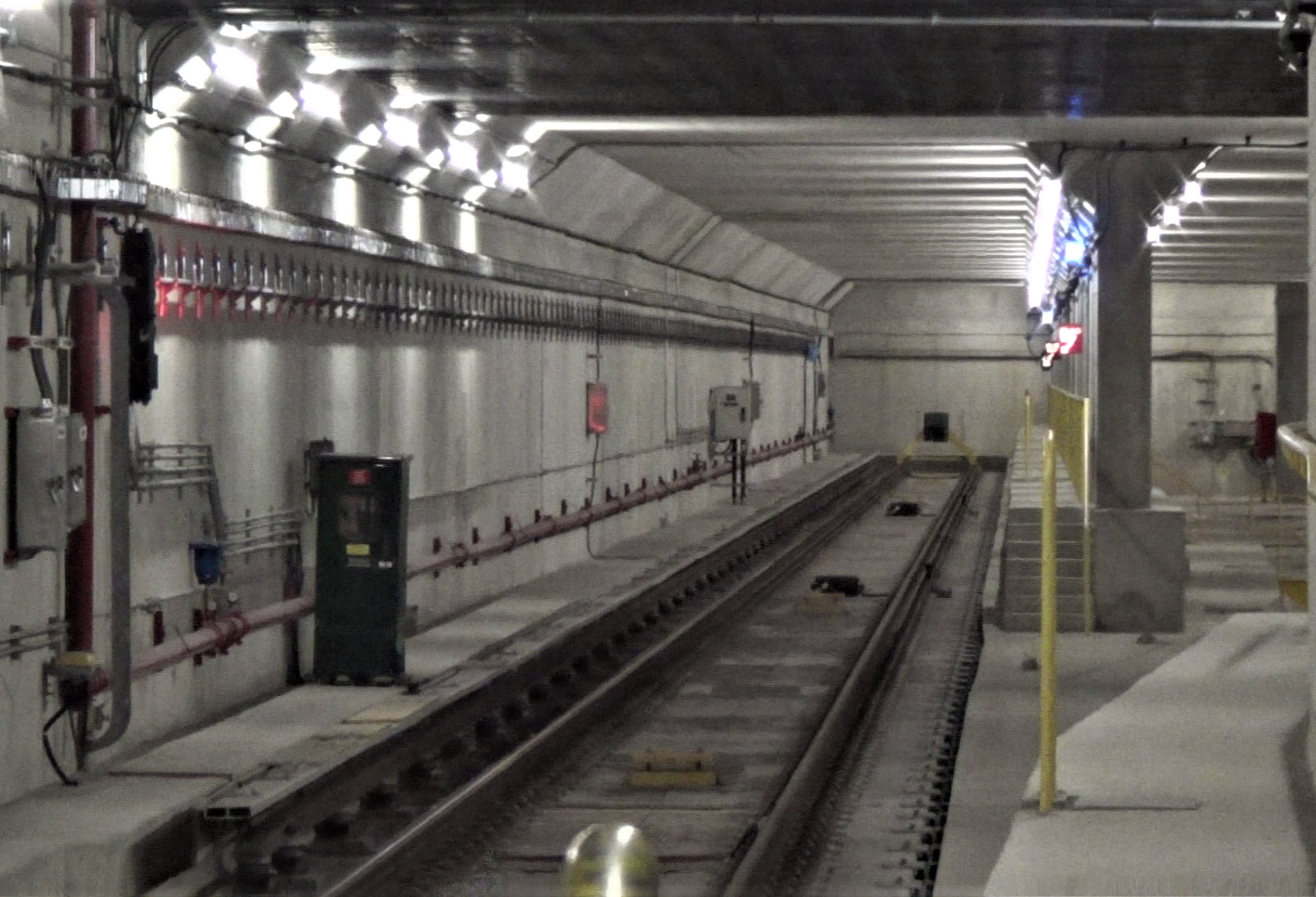
Bumper at the end of a newer tunnel in the Toronto subway system beyond a terminal station

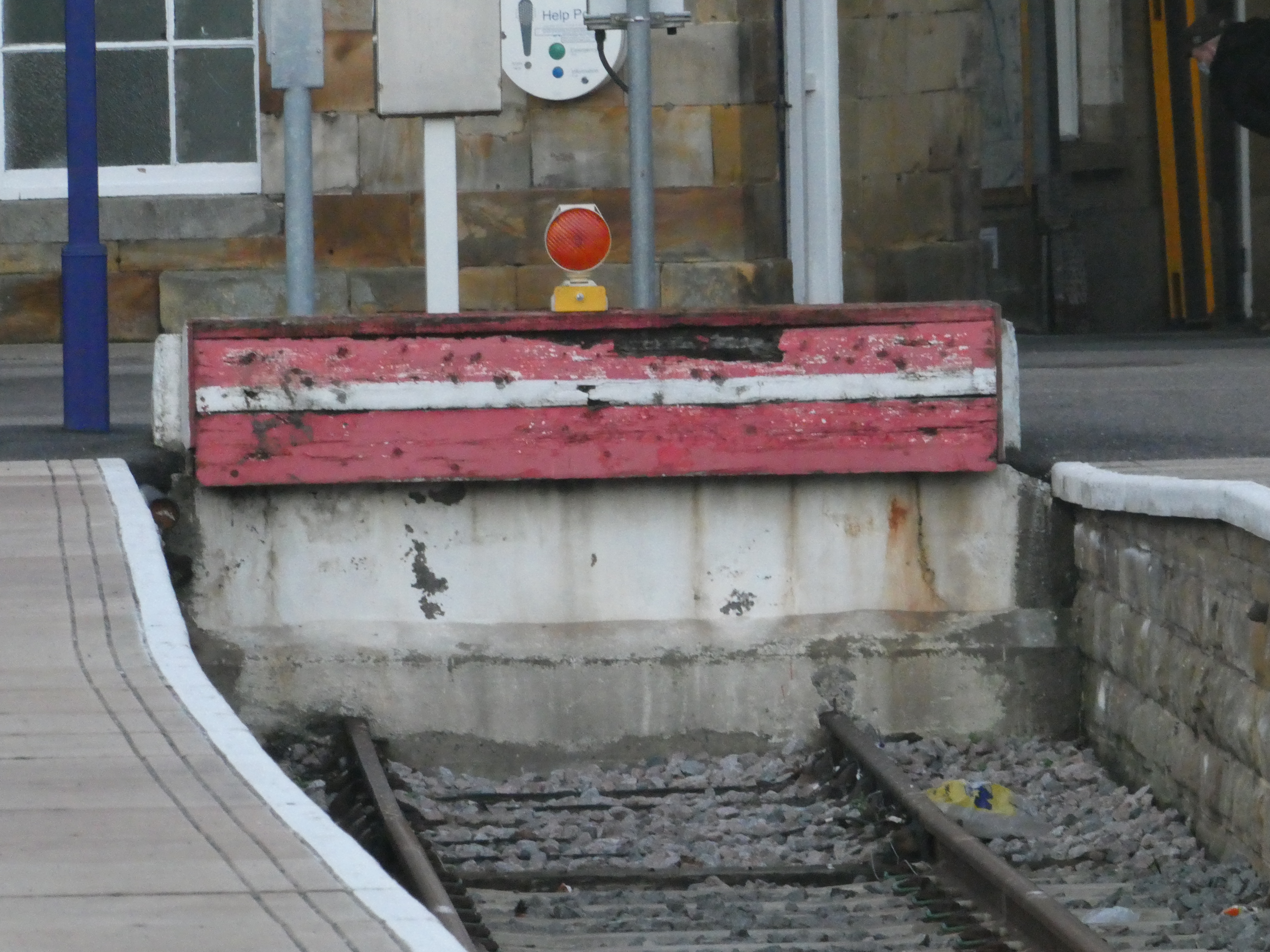
Simple timber stop at Scarborough

== Examples of accidents ==
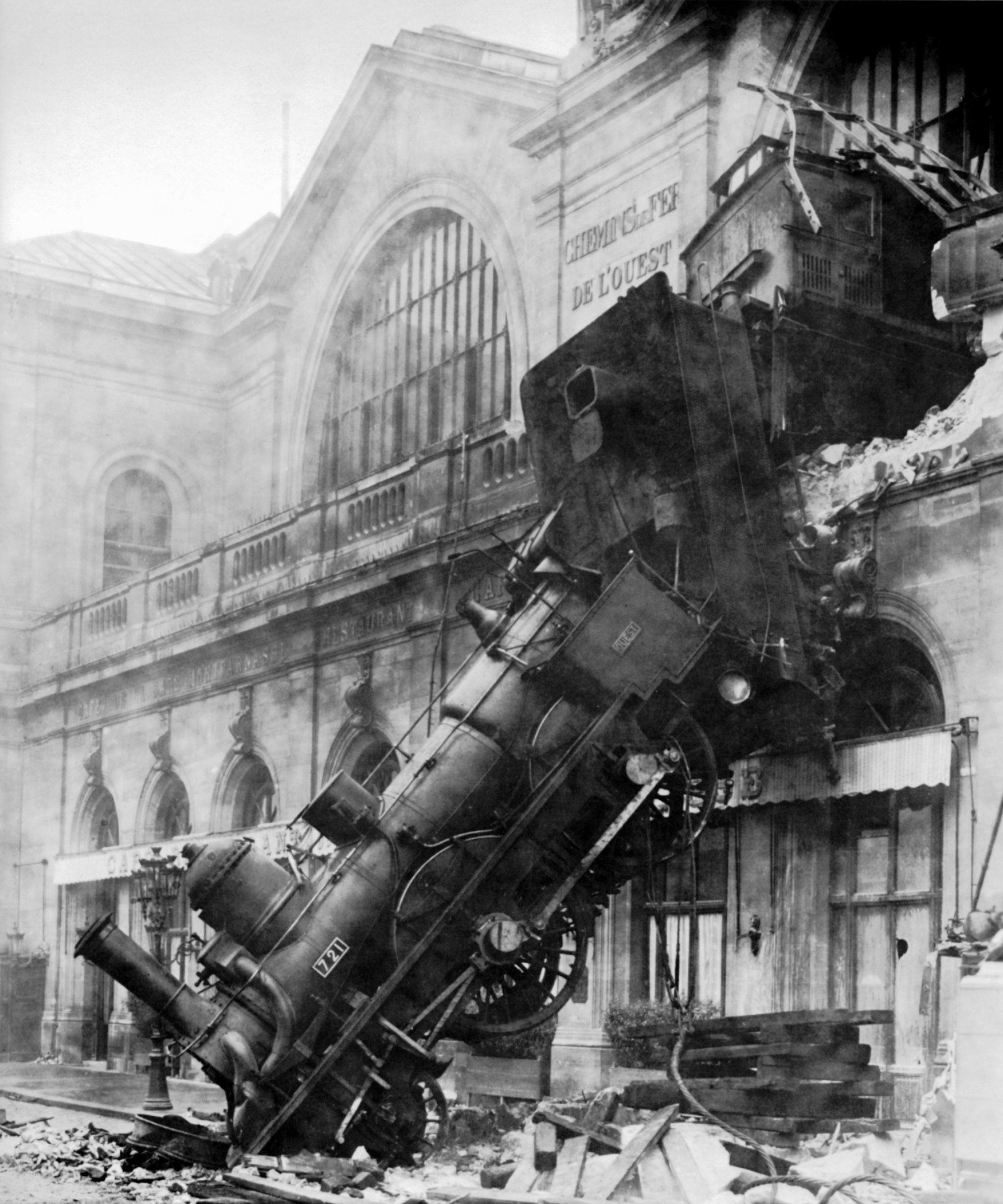
The aftermath of the Gare Montparnasse accident

- 22 October 1895 – Gare Montparnasse, Paris, France – An express train overran the buffer stop and fell into the street below.
- 1902 – Frankfurt am Main, Germany – Serious buffer stop collision inspires development of Rawie range of energy-absorbing buffer stops.
- 27 July 1903 – Glasgow, Scotland – A train arriving at the St Enoch terminal station failed to stop in time and collided heavily with the buffer stop, sustaining severe damage. 16 people were killed, 13 instantaneously and 3 at a later time due to injuries received. 64 people were injured, of which 17 required hospital treatment.
- 15 January 1953 – Washington, D.C. – A train jumped the platform and plunged through the concourse due to a faulty air brake.
- 28 February 1975 – Moorgate tube crash – 43 killed, 74 injured – buffer stop collision made far worse by small size "tube" train running into larger dead-end tunnel beyond. The tunnel could accommodate full-size surface stock thus permitting the smaller train to concertina inside the tunnel.
- 13 April 1978 – Budapest, Hungary – commuter train overruns a buffer stop owing to brake failure and crashes into the station building. 16 killed, 25 injured.
- 8 January 1991 – Cannon Street rail crash, London – 2 killed, 200+ injured – commuter train hits buffer stops.
- 22 February 2012 – Buenos Aires, Argentina – a commuter train collided with buffer stops at a train station in Buenos Aires during the morning rush hour. The accident killed 51 people and injured more than 700 in Argentina's worst rail accident in 30 years. The buffer stops' hydraulic components were found to be disabled and did not absorb the energy of the collision.
- 15 January 2013 – Saltsjöbaden, Sweden – A train parked with the control lever at "Full throttle" was set in motion when a cleaner closed the door on a four-car EMU commuter train in Neglinge depot. It reached 80 km/h (50 mph) and overran a buffer stop at Saltsjöbaden station before crashing into a small apartment block beyond the end of the track, badly injuring the cleaner.
- 13 August 2014 – Manila, Philippines – A southbound MRTC 3000 class train of the MRT Line 3 lost power while departing Magallanes station, prompting a second train to be sent to push the train to Taft Avenue station. However, the unpowered train suddenly decoupled while in motion and overshot the retarding buffer at Taft Avenue station. As a result, the train derailed onto Taft Avenue, causing multiple injuries. An investigation by the Department of Transportation and Communications showed that standard coupling procedures were not followed and that the runaway train did not use its automatic brakes as it was unpowered, adding that the retarding buffer at the station was only designed to handle a maximum speed of 15 kilometers per hour (9.3 mph).
- 20 March 2015 – Uttar Pradesh, India – The Dehradun-Varanasi Janata Express derailed near Bachhrawan, resulting in at least fifty-eight deaths and 150 people being injured. The driver reported by radio that the brakes on the train had failed, and that he could not stop the train. It was diverted into a siding and crashed through the buffers at Bachhrawan.
- 29 September 2016 – Hoboken, New Jersey – The cab car of a NJ Transit Pascack Valley Line commuter train entering Hoboken Terminal overran the buffer block on track five at 8:45 am. The train continued across the low-level passenger concourse connecting the platforms and slammed into a wall of the terminal building, causing serious structural damage. One person was killed and more than 100 were injured.
- 2 November 2020 - De Akkers metro station - a train empty of passengers on the Rotterdam Metro crashed through the buffer stop at the end of the sidings beyond the station. The sidings are built on a viaduct projecting out over the canal. The lead car of the train came to a partial rest on a 10-metre (33 ft) high whale sculpture erected in front of the sidings, preventing the train from falling over the edge and into the canal below.
- 13 March 2021 – Kirkby, United Kingdom – A Class 507 electric multiple units operated by Merseyrail collided with the buffer stop. The only injury was the driver of the train. The cause was found to be that the driver was using a mobile phone while he was driving. The distraction led him to enter the station at excessive speed. He was fired and prosecuted, pleading guilty to a charge of endangering the safety of people on the railway.

== See also ==
- Buffer (rail transport)
- Catch points
- Cushioning
- Derail
- List of rail accidents
- Retarder (railroad)
- Shock absorber
- Wheel chock
