= Cherry Grove, Indiana =

- Unincorporated community
- Location in Montgomery County
- Coordinates: 40°08′08″N 86°54′16″W
- Country: United States
- State: Indiana
- County: Montgomery
- Township: Madison
- Elevation: 801 ft (244 m)
- Time zone: UTC-5 (Eastern (EST))
  - Summer (DST): UTC-4 (EDT)
- ZIP code: 47933
- Area code: 765
- FIPS code: 18-12304
- GNIS feature ID: 432442

Cherry Grove, formerly Cherry Grove Station, is an unincorporated community in Madison Township, Montgomery County, in the U.S. state of Indiana.

== Geography ==
Cherry Grove is 7 miles (11 km) from Crawfordsville, the county seat. It is on US Route 231, between Linden and Crawfordsville, and east of Elmdale, in the central part of the county. Lye Creek Lake and Swamp was once 2 miles (3.2 km) east of Cherry Grove.

== History ==
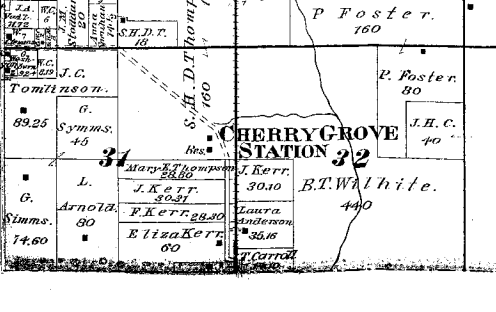
1878 map - Cherry Grove Station, in the southwestern part of Madison Township

=== Early years ===
Cherry Grove was established in 1851 as a railroad switch. The community was likely named after the wild cherry trees in the area.

Cherry Grove, or Cherry Grove Station, was originally regarded as a switching station. It was located in sections 31 and 32 of Madison Township, in the southwestern part of the township, along the rail line of the Louisville, New Albany and Chicago Railroad (LNA&C). According to one source, the railroad station first appears in railroad timetables around 1866.

A project to drain Lye Creek Swamp, located 2 miles (3.2 km) east of Cherry Grove, was begun in 1880. This was done to reclaim the rich agricultural land in the surrounding area. According to one county history, "Lye Creek enters near the extreme northeastern corner of the county, and after flowing in a westerly direction for six miles, suddenly turns to the south. The ancient valley is plainly continued through Lye Creek and Black Creek swamps and Black Creek Valley. The obstructing agent, a vast bed of modified clay and water-washed sands, is at once detected at the head of Black Creek, between Linden and Crawfordsville." A 15 feet (4.6 m)-deep ditch was dug through the obstructing dam.

In 1899, a grain elevator was built in what the Crawfordsville Journal called the village of Cherry Grove. The new elevator was constructed entirely from reclaimed rail materials. The owner, Johnny Lane, stated that the new elevator had already engaged 8,000 bushels of corn. Around this time, Cherry Grove was also the site of the Walter Hotel, which served wild game in the restaurant and received kudos in the Crawfordsville Journal.

=== Later years ===
By the early 20th century, Cherry Grove was considered a "busy community", with several businesses and establishments. Among these establishments were the Cherry Grove School, which operated during the late 1800s and early 1900s.

During World War I, a correspondence began between Cherry Grove resident Cordelia (Brenneman) Thompson and a number of World War I soldiers, including two of her brothers, Roy and Amos Brenneman; as well as family friend James Harley Barton. The letters include a War Department notice that Aaron Brenneman was severely injured on July 26, 1918. The collection of letters was later acquired and archived by the Crawfordsville District Public Library and they were partially published in 2011. After the war, Roy Brenneman lived for a time in Cherry Grove. The letters provide "a glimpse into how young men thought and acted in the early years of the 20th century".

The population of Cherry Grove was 20 in 1940.

The current grain elevator is located south of where the original grain elevator and train station were. Cherry Grove is the site of a historic Ferdinand Railroad 101 locomotive.

== See also ==
- Elmdale, Indiana
