= William Fisher Polygonal Barn =

- U.S. National Register of Historic Places
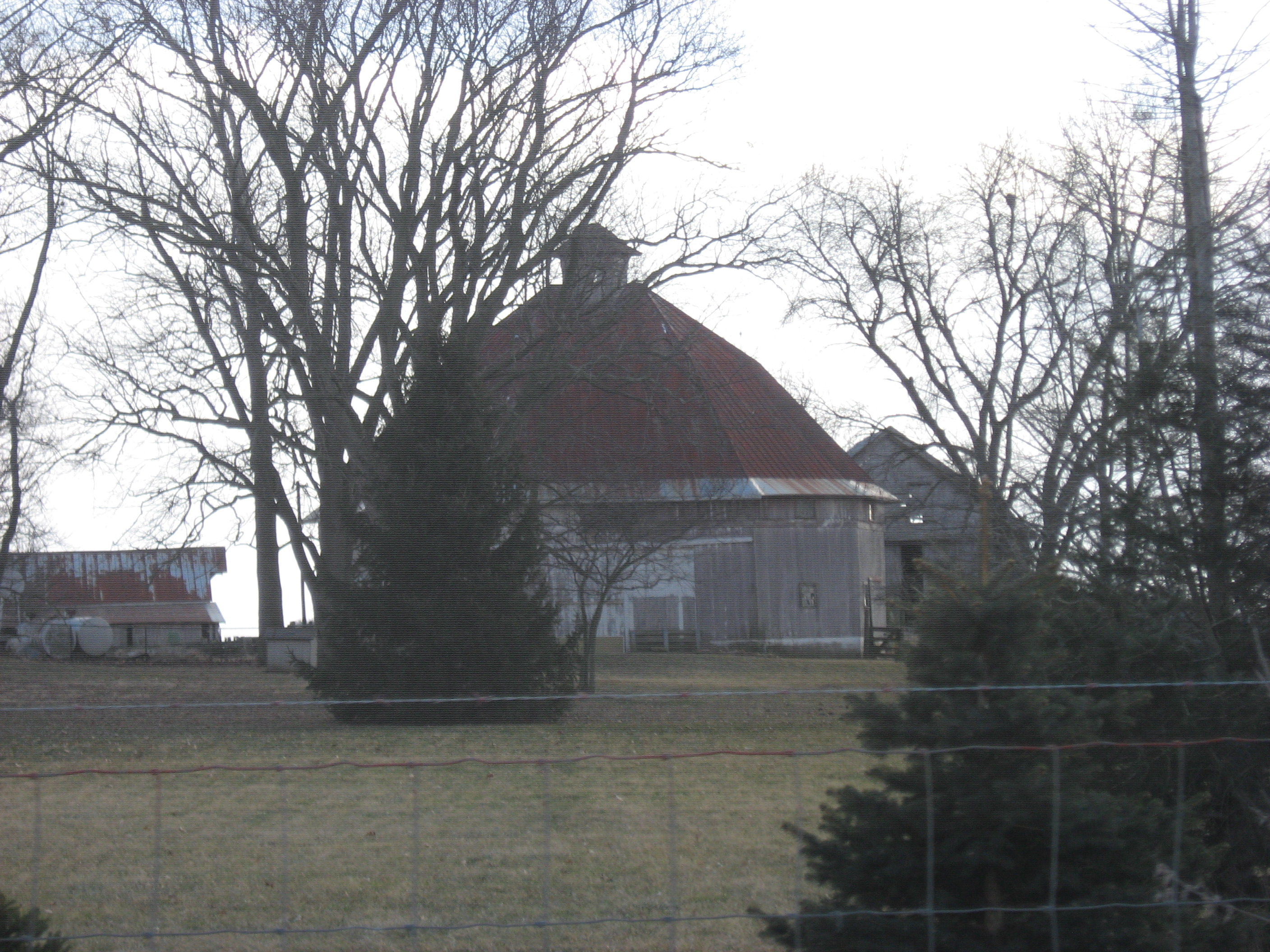
- William Fisher Polygonal Barn, January 2013

- Location within Indiana Location within the United States
- Location: County Road 850N just east of its junction with County Road 800E, west of Bowers in Sugar Creek Township, Montgomery County, Indiana
- Coordinates: 40°9′38″N 86°44′51″W
- Area: less than one acre
- Built: 1914
- Architect: Dain, Ellsworth
- Architectural style: Ten-sided barn
- MPS: Round and Polygonal Barns of Indiana MPS
- NRHP reference No.: 93000188
- Added to NRHP: April 2, 1993

William Fisher Polygonal Barn, also known as the Fisher-Dykes Barn, is a historic 10-sided barn located in Sugar Creek Township, Montgomery County, Indiana. It was built in 1914, and is a two-story, balloon frame structure on a concrete foundation. Two of the 10 sides are 28 feet wide, while the 8 remaining sides are 16 feet wide. The barn is topped by a sectional two-pitched gambrel roof with flared eaves. Atop the roof is a six-sided cupola.

It was listed on the National Register of Historic Places in 1993.
