= Darlington, Indiana =

- Town
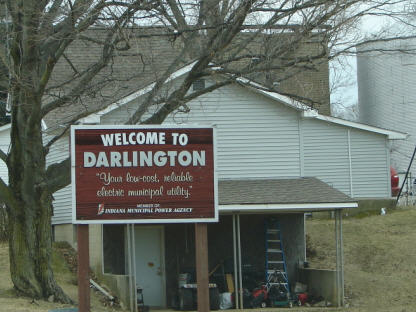

- Location in Montgomery County
- Coordinates: 40°06′26″N 86°46′36″W
- Country: United States
- State: Indiana
- County: Montgomery
- Township: Franklin

Area
  - Total: 0.34 sq mi (0.87 km^{2})
  - Land: 0.34 sq mi (0.87 km^{2})
  - Water: 0 sq mi (0.00 km^{2})
- Elevation: 787 ft (240 m)

Population (2020)
  - Total: 711
  - Density: 2,124.0/sq mi (820.09/km^{2})
- Time zone: UTC-5 (Eastern (EST))
  - Summer (DST): UTC-5 (EDT)
- ZIP code: 47940
- Area code: 765
- FIPS code: 18-16840
- GNIS feature ID: 2396679
- Website: townofdarlington.com

Darlington is a town in Franklin Township, Montgomery County, in the U.S. state of Indiana. The population was 711 at the 2020 census, down from 843 in 2010.

== History ==
Darlington was platted by Enoch Cox in 1836. The city takes its name from Darlington, in England. The post office at Darlington has been in operation since 1837.

The Pennsylvania Railroad (Vandalia district) made stops in Darlington for many years from the late 19th century up until the 1960s. The right-of-way with its numerous wood-pile trestles can still be seen along State Road 47. Many people in Darlington would ride the PRR to Lake Maxinkuckee on weekends during the late 19th and early 20th centuries.

The Vandalia District started southwest of Terre Haute and bisected Montgomery County from Waveland, through Crawfordsville, to Darlington, continuing on to Colfax, where it crossed the NYC Big Four branch.

A man named Arthur Baird II killed his parents, Arthur and Katherine, and his pregnant wife Nadine on September 6–7, 1985; this was the first triple murder to occur in Montgomery County, as well as the first murder in the county since 1978.

On June 2, 1990, an F2 tornado touched down southwest of Darlington and destroyed multiple homes, barns, and property around the area. The town suffered significant damage from the storm.

== Geography ==
Darlington is located in northeastern Montgomery County. Indiana State Road 47 runs along the southern edge of the town, leading southwest 9 miles (14 km) to Crawfordsville and east the same distance to Thorntown. Lafayette is 24 miles (39 km) to the north, and Indianapolis is 45 miles (72 km) to the southeast.

According to the U.S. Census Bureau, Darlington has a total area of 0.33 square miles (0.85 km^{2}), all land. The town is set on higher ground overlooking Sugar Creek to the northwest. Sugar Creek is a southwest-flowing tributary of the Wabash River, which it joins north of Montezuma.

== Demographics ==
Historical population
Census	Pop.	Note	%±
1880	468		—
1890	461		−1.5%
1900	727		57.7%
1910	780		7.3%
1920	823		5.5%
1930	690		−16.2%
1940	683		−1.0%
1950	711		4.1%
1960	668		−6.0%
1970	802		20.1%
1980	811		1.1%
1990	740		−8.8%
2000	854		15.4%
2010	843		−1.3%
2020	711		−15.7%
U.S. Decennial Census

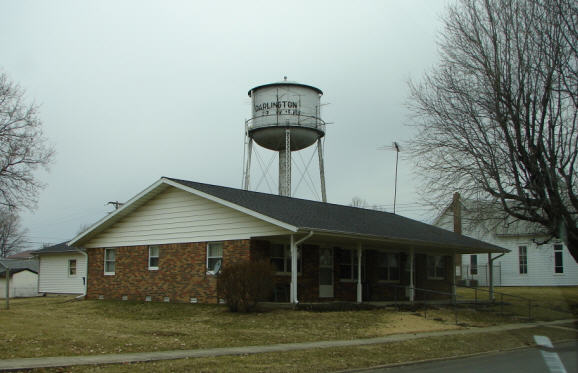
Water tower

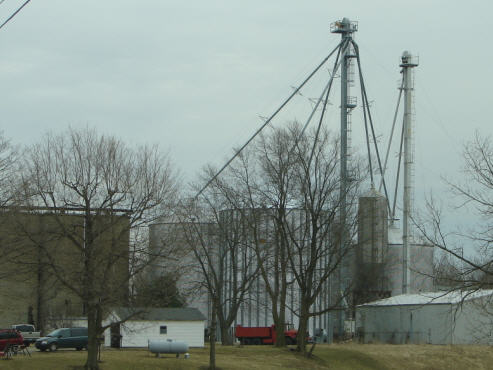
Grain storage

=== 2010 census ===
As of the census of 2010, there were 843 people, 327 households, and 226 families residing in the town. The population density was 2,554.5 inhabitants per square mile (986.3/km^{2}). There were 364 housing units at an average density of 1,103.0 per square mile (425.9/km^{2}). The racial makeup of the town was 98.9% White, 0.1% African American, 0.1% Native American, 0.1% Asian, and 0.7% from two or more races. Hispanic or Latino of any race were 0.2% of the population.

There were 327 households, of which 40.7% had children under the age of 18 living with them, 49.8% were married couples living together, 11.0% had a female householder with no husband present, 8.3% had a male householder with no wife present, and 30.9% were non-families. 26.0% of all households were made up of individuals, and 7% had someone living alone who was 65 years of age or older. The average household size was 2.58 and the average family size was 3.10.

The median age in the town was 35.8 years. 28.9% of residents were under the age of 18; 8.9% were between the ages of 18 and 24; 26.7% were from 25 to 44; 24.4% were from 45 to 64; and 11% were 65 years of age or older. The gender makeup of the town was 50.5% male and 49.5% female.

=== 2000 census ===
As of the census of 2000, there were 854 people, 331 households, and 232 families residing in the town. The population density was 2,706.9 inhabitants per square mile (1,045.1/km^{2}). There were 359 housing units at an average density of 1,137.9 per square mile (439.3/km^{2}). The racial makeup of the town was 99.18% White, 0.12% Asian, 0.23% from other races, and 0.47% from two or more races. Hispanic or Latino of any race were 0.47% of the population.

There were 331 households, out of which 36.9% had children under the age of 18 living with them, 54.1% were married couples living together, 11.5% had a female householder with no husband present, and 29.9% were non-families. 27.2% of all households were made up of individuals, and 13.6% had someone living alone who was 65 years of age or older. The average household size was 2.58 and the average family size was 3.13.

In the town, the population was spread out, with 31.6% under the age of 18, 5.2% from 18 to 24, 30.3% from 25 to 44, 18.3% from 45 to 64, and 14.6% who were 65 years of age or older. The median age was 34 years. For every 100 females, there were 91.1 males. For every 100 females age 18 and over, there were 87.8 males.

The median income for a household in the town was $36,250, and the median income for a family was $43,462. Males had a median income of $35,463 versus $21,310 for females. The per capita income for the town was $15,154. About 5.3% of families and 7.1% of the population were below the poverty line, including 7.1% of those under age 18 and 8.5% of those age 65 or over.

== Government ==
Currently the town utilizes a three-member town board who oversees operations of the town's municipal utilities including electric, wastewater, stormwater, parks, and street maintenance. The town's drinking water is provided by Aqua corporation.

The Darlington Police Department consists of two contracted Crawfordsville City Police officers and one Montgomery County Deputy who patrol forty hours per week to respond to emergencies only. The sheriff's department is responsible for criminal investigations and traffic enforcement.

Fire service is provided by Darlington Community Volunteer Fire Department, Inc. The Fire department exists as its own entity.

== Festivals ==
Early each fall, the town hosts Darlington Fish Fry & Festival in the downtown areas.

== Covered bridge ==
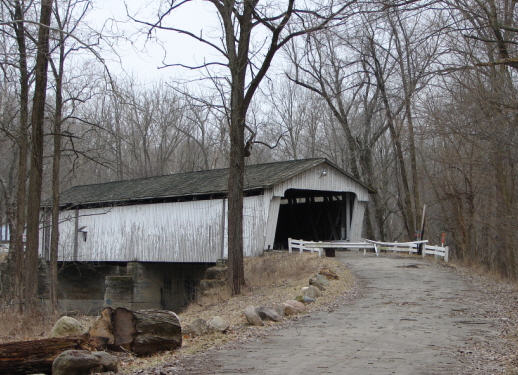
Darlington Covered Bridge

The Darlington Covered Bridge is 1 mile (1.6 km) west of the center of town. It was built in 1868 and is 166 feet (51 m) long.

It was built as a result of donations from Darlington citizens who saw a need for a bridge over Sugar Creek and raised $1,585 in 1866. There was both the bridge and a mill on the site. Only the bridge remains.

As of January 2012, the Montgomery County Commissioners had transferred over $30,000 in funds to the town of Darlington for the restoration and preservation of the historic bridge.

== Education ==
North Montgomery School Corporation serves Darlington. Elementary students are zoned to Sugar Creek Elementary School. Secondary school students attend Northridge Middle School and North Montgomery High School.

Darlington formerly had its own school, with grades 1–12. High school students from Bowers went to the Darlington School, as did, after 1959, Bowers children at the elementary level. An annex to the high school was dedicated in 1956. In 1963, the enrollment count was 470.

The town has a lending library, the Darlington Public Library.
