= Wayne Township, Montgomery County, Indiana =

Wayne Township
- Township
- Location in Montgomery County
- Coordinates: 40°05′16″N 87°02′10″W
- Country: United States
- State: Indiana
- County: Montgomery

Government
  - Type: Indiana township

Area
  - Total: 36.39 sq mi (94.2 km^{2})
  - Land: 36.38 sq mi (94.2 km^{2})
  - Water: 0.01 sq mi (0.026 km^{2}) 0.03%
- Elevation: 771 ft (235 m)

Population (2020)
  - Total: 1,588
  - Density: 43.65/sq mi (16.85/km^{2})
- Time zone: UTC-5 (Eastern (EST))
  - Summer (DST): UTC-4 (EDT)
- ZIP codes: 47933, 47990
- Area code: 765
- GNIS feature ID: 454036

Wayne Township is one of eleven townships in Montgomery County, Indiana, United States. As of the 2020 census, its population was 1,588 (slightly down of 1,590 from 2010) and it contained 678 housing units.

== Geography ==
According to the 2010 census, the township has a total area of 36.39 square miles (94.2 km^{2}), of which 36.38 square miles (94.2 km^{2}) (or 99.97%) is land and 0.01 square miles (0.026 km^{2}) (or 0.03%) is water.

=== Cities, towns, villages ===
- Waynetown

=== Unincorporated towns ===
- Wesley at 40.067820°N 87.006675°W

=== Cemeteries ===
The township contains these two cemeteries: Potts and Thompson.

=== Major highways ===
- Interstate 74
- U.S. Route 136

== School districts ==
- North Montgomery School Corporation

== Political districts ==
- Indiana's 4th congressional district
- State House District 41
- State Senate District 23
