= Madison Township, Montgomery County, Indiana =

Madison Township
- Township
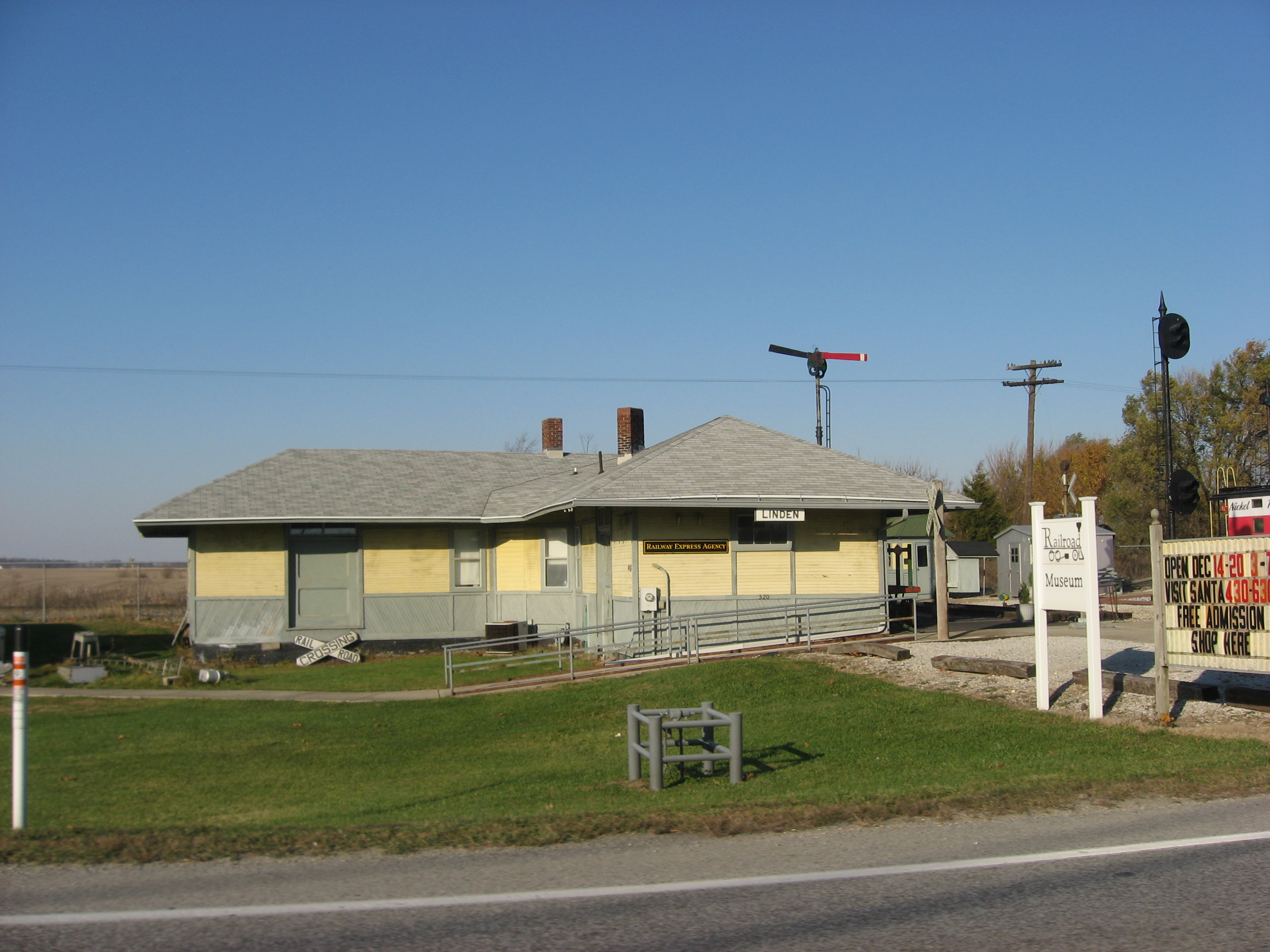
- The Linden Depot, a historic place in the township

- Location in Montgomery County
- Coordinates: 40°10′25″N 86°51′56″W
- Country: United States
- State: Indiana
- County: Montgomery

Government
  - Type: Indiana township

Area
  - Total: 36.23 sq mi (93.8 km^{2})
  - Land: 36.23 sq mi (93.8 km^{2})
  - Water: 0 sq mi (0 km^{2}) 0%
- Elevation: 790 ft (240 m)

Population (2020)
  - Total: 1,192
  - Density: 32.90/sq mi (12.70/km^{2})
- Time zone: UTC-5 (Eastern (EST))
  - Summer (DST): UTC-4 (EDT)
- ZIP codes: 47933, 47955
- Area code: 765
- GNIS feature ID: 453594

Madison Township is one of eleven townships in Montgomery County, Indiana, United States. As of the 2010 census, its population was 1,192 (down from 1,272 at 2010) and it had 512 housing units.

== Geography ==
According to the 2010 census, the township has a total area of 36.23 square miles (93.8 km^{2}), all land.

=== Cities, towns, villages ===
- Linden

=== Unincorporated towns ===
- Cherry Grove at 40.135596°N 86.904452°W
- Kirkpatrick at 40.206427°N 86.819173°W

=== Major highways ===
- U.S. Route 231

=== Airports and landing strips ===
- Wilkins Strip Airport

== Education ==
- North Montgomery School Corporation

Madison Township residents may obtain a free library card from the Linden Carnegie Public Library in Linden.

== Political districts ==
- Indiana's 4th congressional district
- State House District 41
- State Senate District 23
