= North Montgomery High School =

- North Montgomery Chargers

Location
- 5945 US 231 North; Crawfordsville, Montgomery County, Indiana 47933; United States; 40.124711°N 86.906912°W

Information
- Type: Public high school
- Established: c. 1971
- School district: North Montgomery School Corporation
- Principal: Jonathan Guthrie
- Teaching staff: 38.50 (FTE)
- Grades: 9–12
- Enrollment: 513 (2023-2024)
- Student to teacher ratio: 13.32
- Colors: Blue and Orange
- Athletics conference: Monon Athletic Conference (MAC)
- Team name: Chargers
- Yearbook: Charger Flashback
- Website: nmhs.nm.k12.in.us

North Montgomery High School is a public high school located in unincorporated Montgomery County, Indiana, near Crawfordsville. It is a part of the North Montgomery School Corporation.

It is the only high school in the district, and it serves some sections of northern Crawfordsville, Darlington, Linden, New Richmond, Waynetown, and Wingate. It also serves the unincorporated area of Garfield.

As of 2022, the school had 549 students and boasted a student/teacher ratio of 12.9. Per pupil expenditures averaged $10,736 in 2022 and 29.3% of students were signed up for free/reduced lunch.

== See also ==
- List of high schools in Indiana

Other high schools in Montgomery County:

- Crawfordsville High School
- Southmont High School
