= Kirkpatrick, Indiana =

- Unincorporated community
- Location in Montgomery County
- Coordinates: 40°12′23″N 86°49′09″W
- Country: United States
- State: Indiana
- County: Montgomery
- Township: Madison
- Elevation: 797 ft (243 m)
- Time zone: UTC-5 (Eastern (EST))
  - Summer (DST): UTC-4 (EDT)
- ZIP code: 47955
- Area code: 765
- FIPS code: 18-39978
- GNIS feature ID: 437358

Kirkpatrick is an unincorporated community in Madison Township, Montgomery County, in the U.S. state of Indiana.

== History ==
Kirkpatrick was laid out in 1882. A post office was established at Kirkpatrick in 1881 which remained in operation until it was discontinued in 1931.
