= North Montgomery School Corporation =

School district in Indiana, United States

Coordinates: 40°07′24.9″N 86°54′47.0″W

North Montgomery Community School Corporation (NMCSC) or North Montgomery Schools is a school district headquartered in unincorporated Montgomery County, Indiana, north of Crawfordsville.

The district includes the following townships: Coal Creek, Franklin, Madison, Sugar Creek, Wayne, and a portion of Union. The district includes some sections of northern Crawfordsville, as well as Darlington, Linden, New Richmond, Waynetown, and Wingate. It also serves the unincorporated area of Garfield.

== Schools ==
Secondary schools:

- North Montgomery High School
- North Montgomery Middle School

Primary schools:

- Pleasant Hill Elementary School
  - Serves portions of northern Crawfordsville, Linden, New Richmond, and Wingate
- Lester B. Sommer Elementary School
  - Serves portions of western Crawfordsville and Waynetown
- Sugar Creek Elementary School
  - Serves portions of eastern Crawfordsville and Darlington
  - By 1992, a program for "latchkey" children to stay after school was developed. That year, The Indianapolis News editorial page wrote that it "appears to be a fine program."

== See also ==
School districts in Montgomery County, Indiana:

- Crawfordsville Community School Corporation
- South Montgomery Community School Corporation
