= Coal Creek Township, Montgomery County, Indiana =

Coal Creek Township
- Township
- Location in Montgomery County
- Coordinates: 40°10′04″N 87°00′30″W
- Country: United States
- State: Indiana
- County: Montgomery

Government
  - Type: Indiana township

Area
  - Total: 53.76 sq mi (139.2 km^{2})
  - Land: 53.76 sq mi (139.2 km^{2})
  - Water: 0 sq mi (0 km^{2}) 0%
- Elevation: 790 ft (240 m)

Population (2020)
  - Total: 1,455
  - Density: 27.06/sq mi (10.45/km^{2})
- Time zone: UTC-5 (Eastern (EST))
  - Summer (DST): UTC-4 (EDT)
- ZIP codes: 47933, 47955, 47967, 47981, 47990, 47994
- Area code: 765
- GNIS feature ID: 453236

Coal Creek Township is one of eleven townships in Montgomery County, Indiana, United States. As of the 2020 census, its population was 1,455 (down from 1,544 at 2010) and it contained 655 housing units.

Coal Creek Township took its name from Coal Creek, which was so named from the deposits of coal in its hillsides.

== Geography ==
According to the 2010 census, the township has a total area of 53.76 square miles (139.2 km^{2}), all land.

=== Cities, towns, villages ===
- New Richmond
- Wingate

=== Unincorporated towns ===
- Elmdale at 40.136707°N 87.017508°W

(This list is based on USGS data and may include former settlements.)

=== Cemeteries ===
The township contains these seven cemeteries: Meharry, Mount Pleasant, Oakland, Old Turkey Run, Pleasant Hill, Willhite and Wilson Killen.

=== Public safety ===
Fire and basic medical service is provided by Coal Creek Fire & Rescue Inc. CCF&R is the only volunteer fire department within Montgomery County to boast more than one fire station. A new building, completed in 2006, resides in New Richmond, and recently in 2010, CCFD opened a newer facility in Wingate, although both towns each had a fire hall prior to recently relocating.

Ambulance service is provided by S.T.A.R. http://starambulance.net/

CCF&R is funded by contracts from both the towns of Wingate and New Richmond, as well as by taxes paid to the Township Trustee.

Law enforcement service is provided by the Montgomery County Sheriff's Department as well as the Indiana State Police, Wingate Town Marshal.

== School districts ==
- North Montgomery School Corporation

== Political districts ==
- Indiana's 4th congressional district
- State House District 41
- State Senate District 23
