= Wingate, Indiana =

- Town
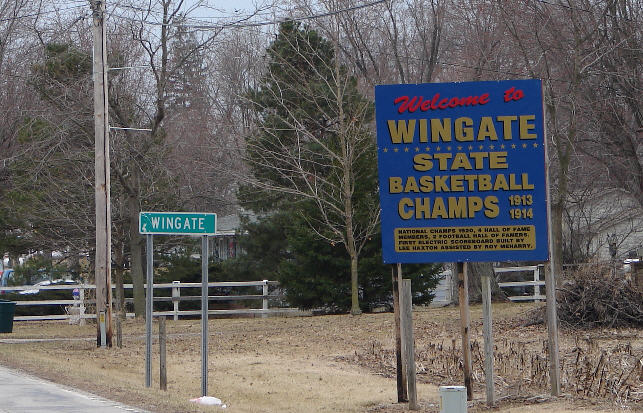

- Location in Montgomery County, Indiana
- Coordinates: 40°10′20″N 87°04′21″W
- Country: United States
- State: Indiana
- County: Montgomery
- Township: Coal Creek

Area
  - Total: 0.19 sq mi (0.50 km^{2})
  - Land: 0.19 sq mi (0.50 km^{2})
  - Water: 0 sq mi (0.00 km^{2})
- Elevation: 774 ft (236 m)

Population (2020)
  - Total: 237
  - Density: 1,224.6/sq mi (472.83/km^{2})
- Time zone: UTC-5 (Eastern (EST))
  - Summer (DST): UTC-4 (EDT)
- ZIP code: 47994
- Area code: 765
- FIPS code: 18-84914
- GNIS feature ID: 2397750
- Website: townofwingate.in.gov

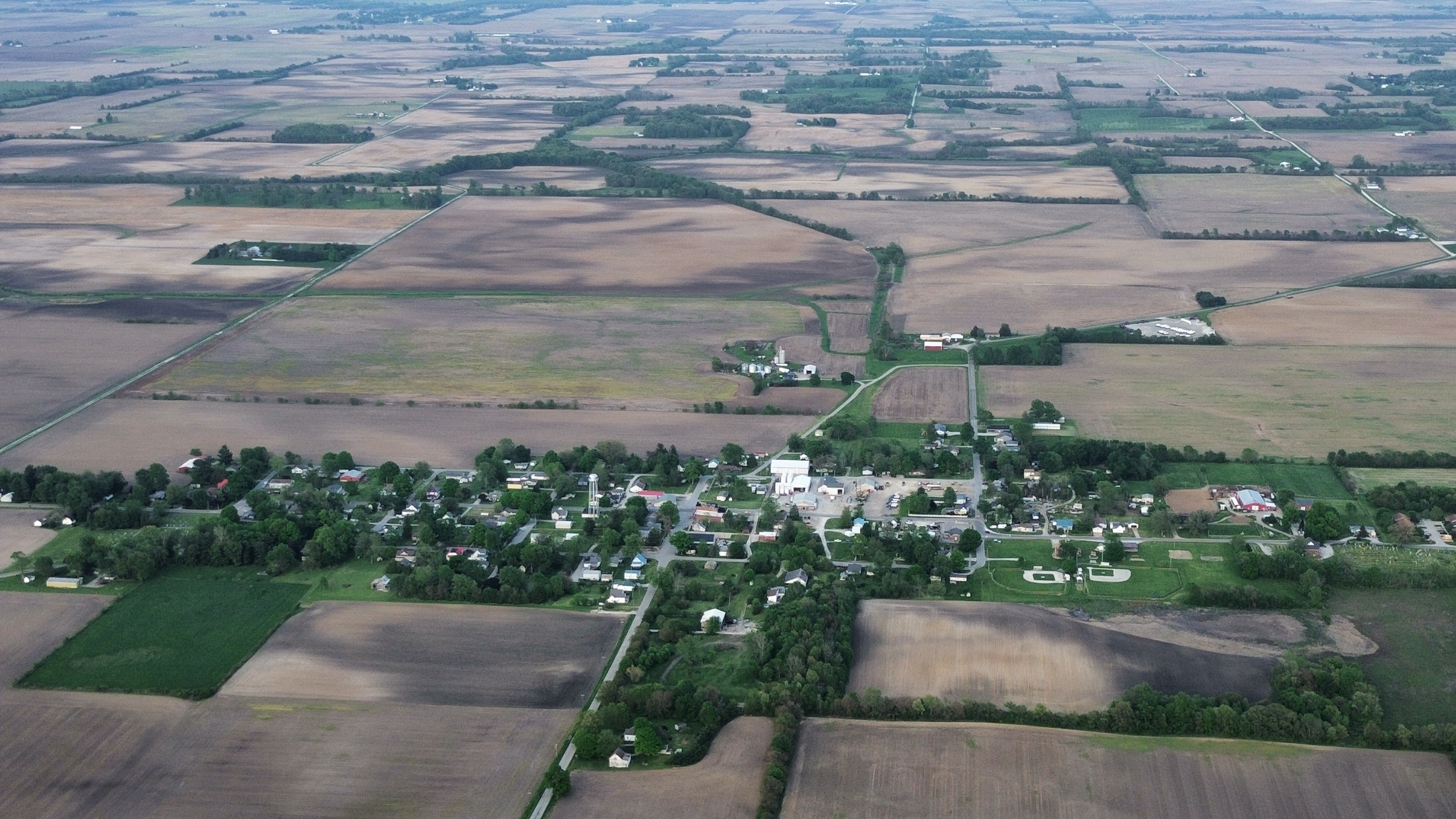

Wingate, formerly known as Pleasant Hill, is a town in Coal Creek Township, Montgomery County, in the U.S. state of Indiana. The population was 237 at the 2020 census.

== History ==
Wingate was originally platted as Pleasant Hill by Christian Bever in 1832. In the late 1890s and early 1900s, the town's name was briefly changed to "Whitlock" on maps. The original name was changed from Pleasant Hill to avoid confusion with another town of the same name located along the rail line. Later, the name Wingate was temporarily changed to Whitlock to appease the political adversaries of John C. Wingate. The town was eventually renamed in honor of prominent local figure, John C. Wingate.

=== Sports heritage ===
Signage at the north and south entrances of the town (shown right) along Indiana State Road 25 proudly states that after the first Indiana State Basketball Championships were held in 1911, the Wingate team became the first to win back-to-back championships in 1913 and 1914. The sign also mentions that Wingate produced four Indiana Basketball Hall of Fame inductees—Homer Stonebraker, Jesse Wood, Lee Thorn and Alonzo Goldsberry—and two football hall of famers. The Basketball Hall of Fame inducted a fifth player, Forest Crane, in 2013. Wingate was also the site of the first electric basketball scoreboard, invented in 1935 by two local men, Lee Haxton and Roy Meharry.

== Geography ==
Map of Wingate

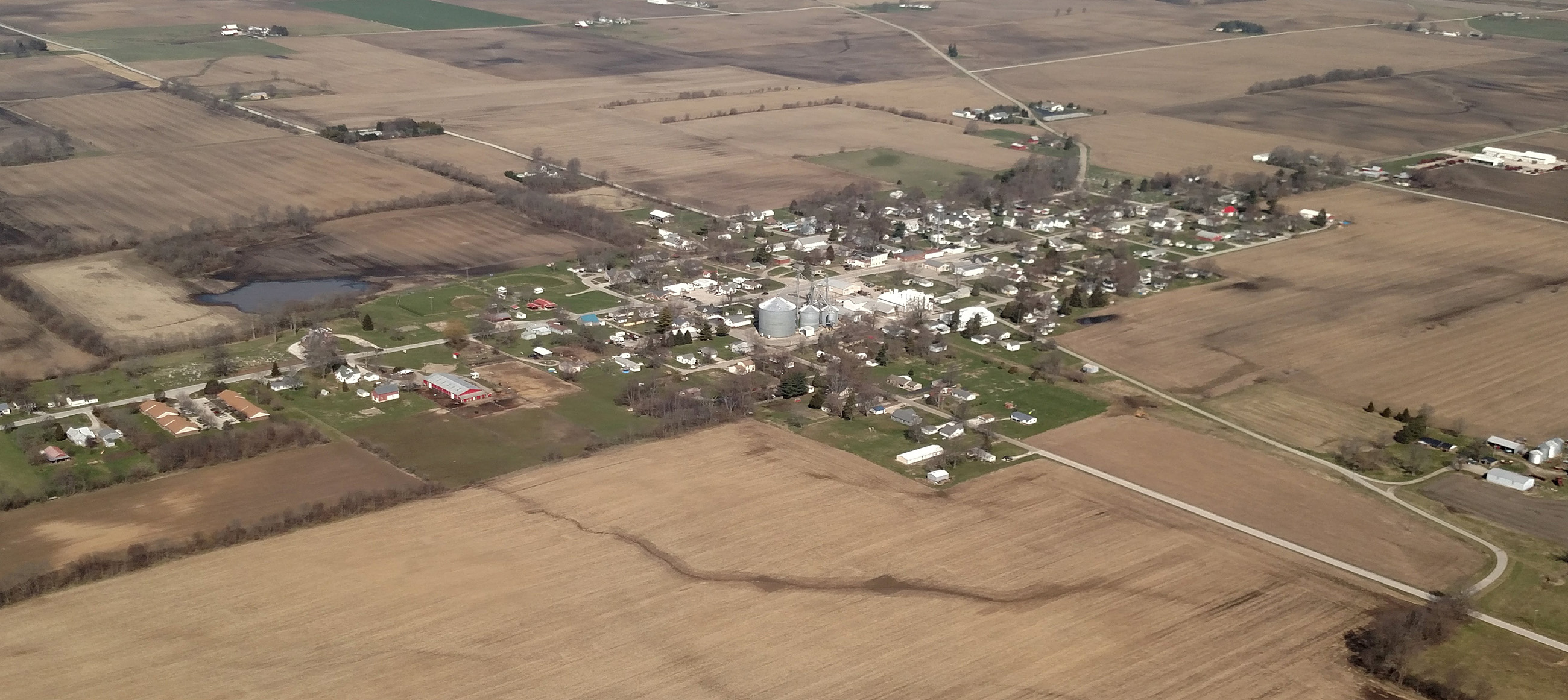
Aerial view looking to the northwest

Wingate is located at the intersection of Indiana State Road 25 and Indiana State Road 55 in the northwest corner of Montgomery County, approximately 13 miles (21 km) northwest of Crawfordsville, the county seat. Wingate is the southern terminus of State Road 55, which runs northwest out of town, leading 5 miles (8 km) to Newtown. SR 25 leads south 6 miles (10 km) to Waynetown and northeast 22 miles (35 km) to Lafayette.

According to the U.S. Census Bureau, Wingate has a total area of 0.19 square miles (0.49 km^{2}), all land.

== Government ==
Currently the town utilizes a three-member town board and a town clerk. These are elected positions. The town appoints a maintenance superintendent and a town marshal. The maintenance person is responsible for signage, road condition, sewers, and water. The town marshal is charged with enforcing town ordinance, state and local law.

== Demographics ==
Historical population
Census	Pop.	Note	%±
1900	457		—
1910	446		−2.4%
1920	464		4.0%
1930	408		−12.1%
1940	380		−6.9%
1950	400		5.3%
1960	431		7.8%
1970	437		1.4%
1980	373		−14.6%
1990	275		−26.3%
2000	299		8.7%
2010	263		−12.0%
2020	237		−9.9%
U.S. Decennial Census

=== 2010 census ===
As of the census of 2010, there were 263 people, 114 households, and 76 families living in the town. The population density was 1,195.5 inhabitants per square mile (461.6/km^{2}). There were 128 housing units at an average density of 581.8 per square mile (224.6/km^{2}). The racial makeup of the town was 100.0% White.

There were 114 households, of which 31.6% had children under the age of 18 living with them, 50.9% were married couples living together, 8.8% had a female householder with no husband present, 7.0% had a male householder with no wife present, and 33.3% were non-families. 32.5% of all households were made up of individuals, and 16.7% had someone living alone who was 65 years of age or older. The average household size was 2.31 and the average family size was 2.84.

The median age in the town was 44.4 years. 21.7% of residents were under the age of 18; 5.6% were between the ages of 18 and 24; 24% were from 25 to 44; 29.6% were from 45 to 64; and 19% were 65 years of age or older. The gender makeup of the town was 49.8% male and 50.2% female.

=== 2000 census ===
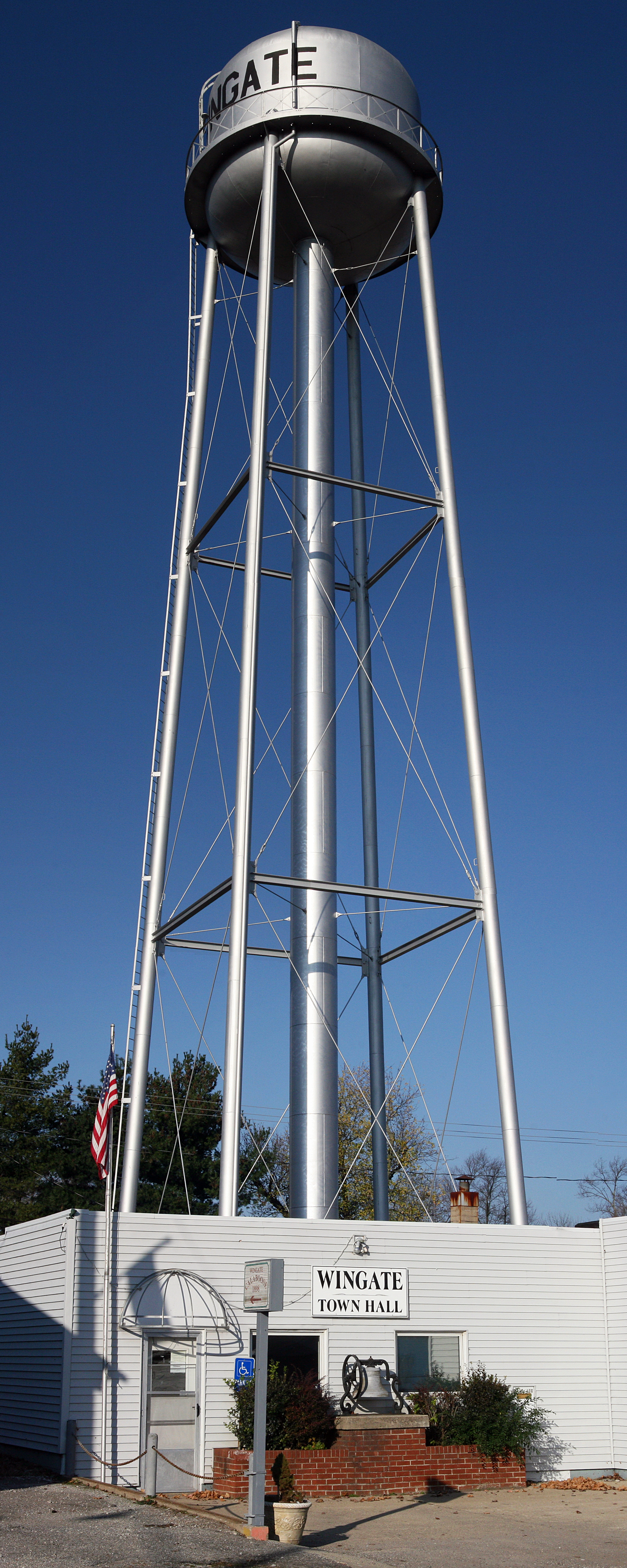
The Wingate town hall and water tower

As of the census of 2000, there were 299 people, 126 households, and 82 families living in the town. The population density was 1,086.0 inhabitants per square mile (419.3/km^{2}). There were 146 housing units at an average density of 530.3 per square mile (204.7/km^{2}). The racial makeup of the town was 99.67% White and 0.33% Asian. Hispanic or Latino of any race were 0.33% of the population.

There were 126 households, out of which 27.8% had children under the age of 18 living with them, 53.2% were married couples living together, 5.6% had a female householder with no husband present, and 34.9% were non-families. 31.0% of all households were made up of individuals, and 17.5% had someone living alone who was 65 years of age or older. The average household size was 2.37 and the average family size was 2.95.

In the town, the population was spread out, with 26.1% under the age of 18, 4.3% from 18 to 24, 29.4% from 25 to 44, 19.4% from 45 to 64, and 20.7% who were 65 years of age or older. The median age was 40 years. For every 100 females, there were 92.9 males. For every 100 females age 18 and over, there were 90.5 males.

The median income for a household in the town was $28,750, and the median income for a family was $42,500. Males had a median income of $41,250 versus $21,250 for females. The per capita income for the town was $14,123. About 15.9% of families and 22.2% of the population were below the poverty line, including 30.7% of those under the age of eighteen and 23.7% of those 65 or over.

== Education ==
North Montgomery School Corporation serves Wingate. Elementary students are zoned to Pleasant Hill Elementary School. Secondary school students attend Northridge Middle School and North Montgomery High School.

== Gallery ==
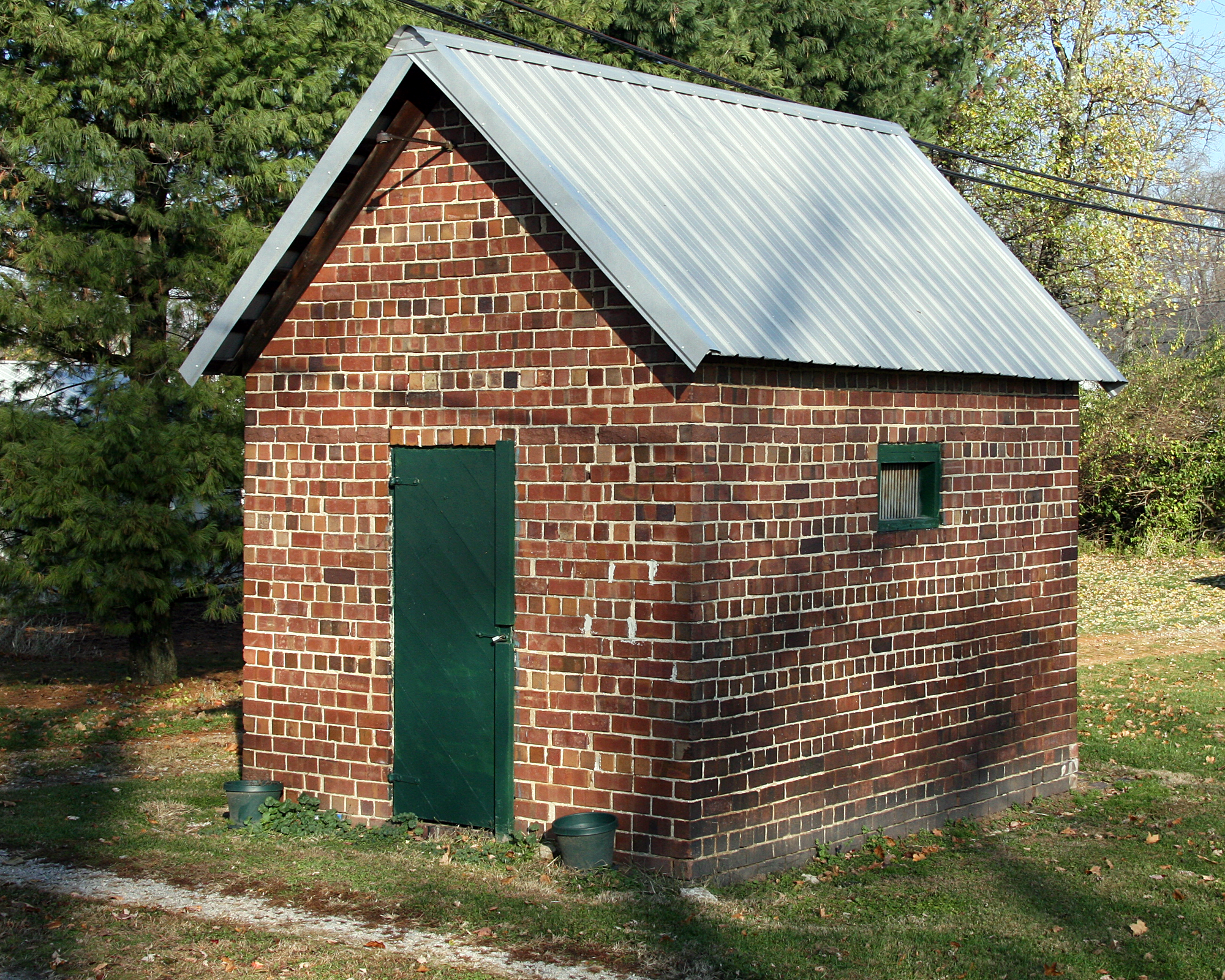
The historic 1898 calaboose

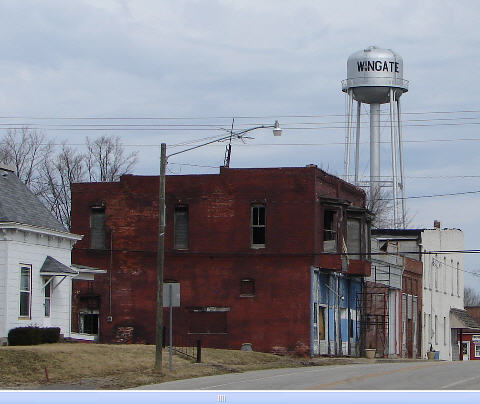
Buildings along Vine Street

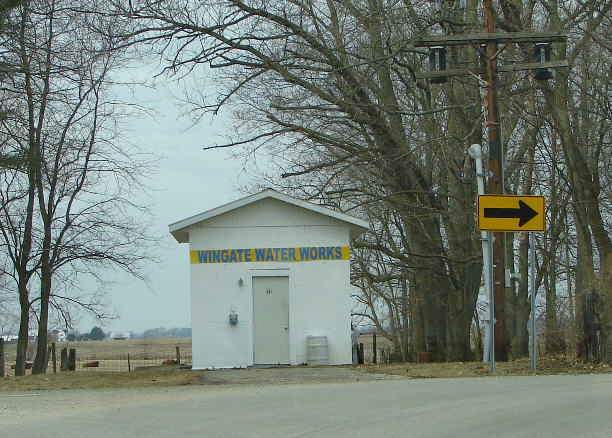
The water works
