= Wesley, Indiana =

- Unincorporated community
- Location in Montgomery County
- Coordinates: 40°04′04″N 87°00′24″W
- Country: United States
- State: Indiana
- County: Montgomery
- Township: Wayne
- Elevation: 797 ft (243 m)
- Time zone: UTC-5 (Eastern (EST))
  - Summer (DST): UTC-4 (EDT)
- ZIP code: 47933
- Area code: 765
- FIPS code: 18-82286
- GNIS feature ID: 445688

Wesley is an unincorporated community in Wayne Township, Montgomery County, in the U.S. state of Indiana.

== History ==
This unincorporated town was home to a train station (now gone) and a church school called Wesley Academy (building still there, no school being held any longer). The Wesley Chapel Church building that was built in 1901 is still standing today and will conduct worship services from time to time, and the Wesley Cemetery is also still being used today. The Wesley Chapel building still has most of the original stained glass windows installed along with many of the original fixtures still being used in the building for church services being held there today.

The main section of Wesley is located on the northern part of Section 20, Wayne Township, Montgomery County, Indiana on the south side of highway U.S. 136. Today, the village is dominated by the old Wesley Academy School building and the Wesley Church building. Wesley Storage sits to the east of the church and a butcher shop and meat locker (Miller's Quality Meats and Catering) to the east and several homes.

The Big Four Railroad was built to the west and south of Wesley in 1869 and 1.2 miles west of the village along the highway a flag stop was installed called Wesley Flag Station. It was at the station where a post office was set up, in addition to a grocery and cabinet shop. A wind mill pumped water to supply the locomotives and a toll booth was installed here when the road was graveled in the 1870.

A post office was established at Wesley in 1860, and remained in operation until it was discontinued in 1902.
