= New Richmond, Indiana =

- Town
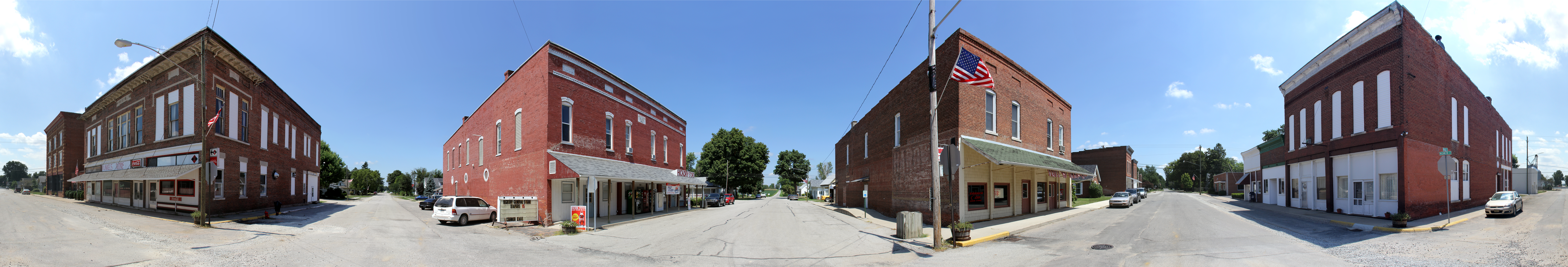
- The corner of Wabash and Washington streets

- Location in Montgomery County
- Coordinates: 40°11′39″N 86°58′40″W
- Country: United States
- State: Indiana
- County: Montgomery
- Township: Coal Creek

Area
  - Total: 0.19 sq mi (0.50 km^{2})
  - Land: 0.19 sq mi (0.50 km^{2})
  - Water: 0 sq mi (0.00 km^{2})
- Elevation: 784 ft (239 m)

Population (2020)
  - Total: 309
  - Density: 1,608.1/sq mi (620.88/km^{2})
- Time zone: UTC-5 (Eastern (EST))
  - Summer (DST): UTC-4 (EDT)
- ZIP code: 47967
- Area code: 765
- FIPS code: 18-53532
- GNIS feature ID: 2396808
- Website: www.nrtown.com

New Richmond is a town in Coal Creek Township, Montgomery County, in the U.S. state of Indiana. The population was 309 at the 2020 census.

== History ==
New Richmond was platted by Samuel Kincaid in 1836. The post office at New Richmond has been in operation since 1850.

In 1985, New Richmond was turned into Hickory, Indiana, for the filming of the motion picture Hoosiers, starring Gene Hackman, Barbara Hershey, and Dennis Hopper. Signs on the roads leading into town recall the community's role in the film.

== Geography ==
New Richmond is located in northwestern Montgomery County. It is 12 miles (19 km) northwest of Crawfordsville, the county seat, and 17 miles (27 km) southwest of Lafayette.

According to the U.S. Census Bureau, New Richmond has a total area of 0.19 square miles (0.49 km^{2}), all land.

== Demographics ==
Historical population
Census	Pop.	Note	%±
1880	72		—
1900	357		—
1910	464		30.0%
1920	436		−6.0%
1930	391		−10.3%
1940	368		−5.9%
1950	391		6.3%
1960	394		0.8%
1970	381		−3.3%
1980	403		5.8%
1990	312		−22.6%
2000	349		11.9%
2010	333		−4.6%
2020	309		−7.2%
U.S. Decennial Census

=== 2010 census ===
As of the census of 2010, there were 333 people, 134 households, and 93 families living in the town. The population density was 1,665.0 inhabitants per square mile (642.9/km^{2}). There were 148 housing units at an average density of 740.0 per square mile (285.7/km^{2}). The racial makeup of the town was 97.0% White, 0.3% Asian, and 2.7% from two or more races. Hispanic or Latino of any race were 0.6% of the population.

There were 134 households, of which 35.8% had children under the age of 18 living with them, 50.7% were married couples living together, 9.7% had a female householder with no husband present, 9.0% had a male householder with no wife present, and 30.6% were non-families. 25.4% of all households were made up of individuals, and 8.2% had someone living alone who was 65 years of age or older. The average household size was 2.49 and the average family size was 2.89.

The median age in the town was 37.8 years. 26.7% of residents were under the age of 18; 8.7% were between the ages of 18 and 24; 26.1% were from 25 to 44; 26.1% were from 45 to 64; and 12.3% were 65 years of age or older. The gender makeup of the town was 49.8% male and 50.2% female.

=== 2000 census ===
As of the census of 2000, there were 349 people, 132 households, and 100 families living in the town. The population density was 1,950.0 inhabitants per square mile (752.9/km^{2}). There were 145 housing units at an average density of 810.2 per square mile (312.8/km^{2}). The racial makeup of the town was 98.85% White, 0.57% African American, and 0.57% from two or more races. Hispanic or Latino of any race were 0.29% of the population.

There were 132 households, out of which 39.4% had children under the age of 18 living with them, 66.7% were married couples living together, 7.6% had a female householder with no husband present, and 23.5% were non-families. 22.0% of all households were made up of individuals, and 6.8% had someone living alone who was 65 years of age or older. The average household size was 2.64 and the average family size was 3.08.

In the town, the population was spread out, with 29.2% under the age of 18, 7.7% from 18 to 24, 32.1% from 25 to 44, 19.8% from 45 to 64, and 11.2% who were 65 years of age or older. The median age was 33 years. For every 100 females, there were 99.4 males. For every 100 females age 18 and over, there were 83.0 males.

The median income for a household in the town was $43,438, and the median income for a family was $50,268. Males had a median income of $32,917 versus $24,375 for females. The per capita income for the town was $17,001. None of the families and 3.8% of the population were living below the poverty line, including no under eighteens and 16.7% of those over 64.

== Education ==
North Montgomery School Corporation serves New Richmond. Elementary students are zoned to Pleasant Hill Elementary School. Secondary school students attend Northridge Middle School and North Montgomery High School.

== Gallery ==
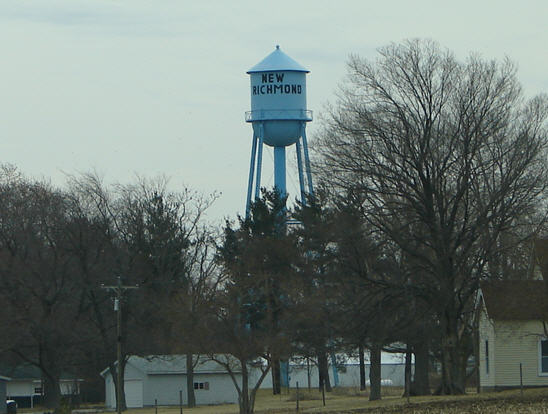
The town's water tower

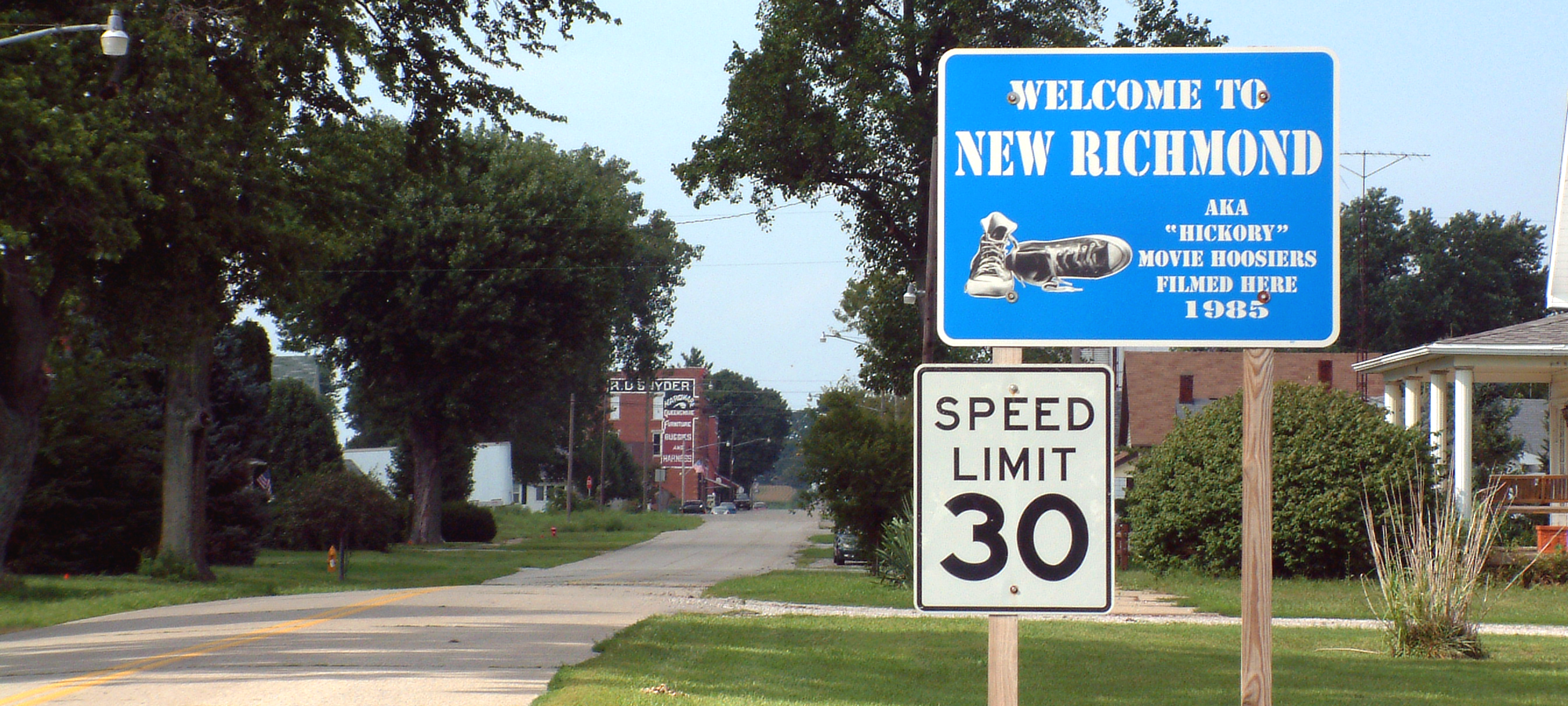
Looking north along Wabash Street

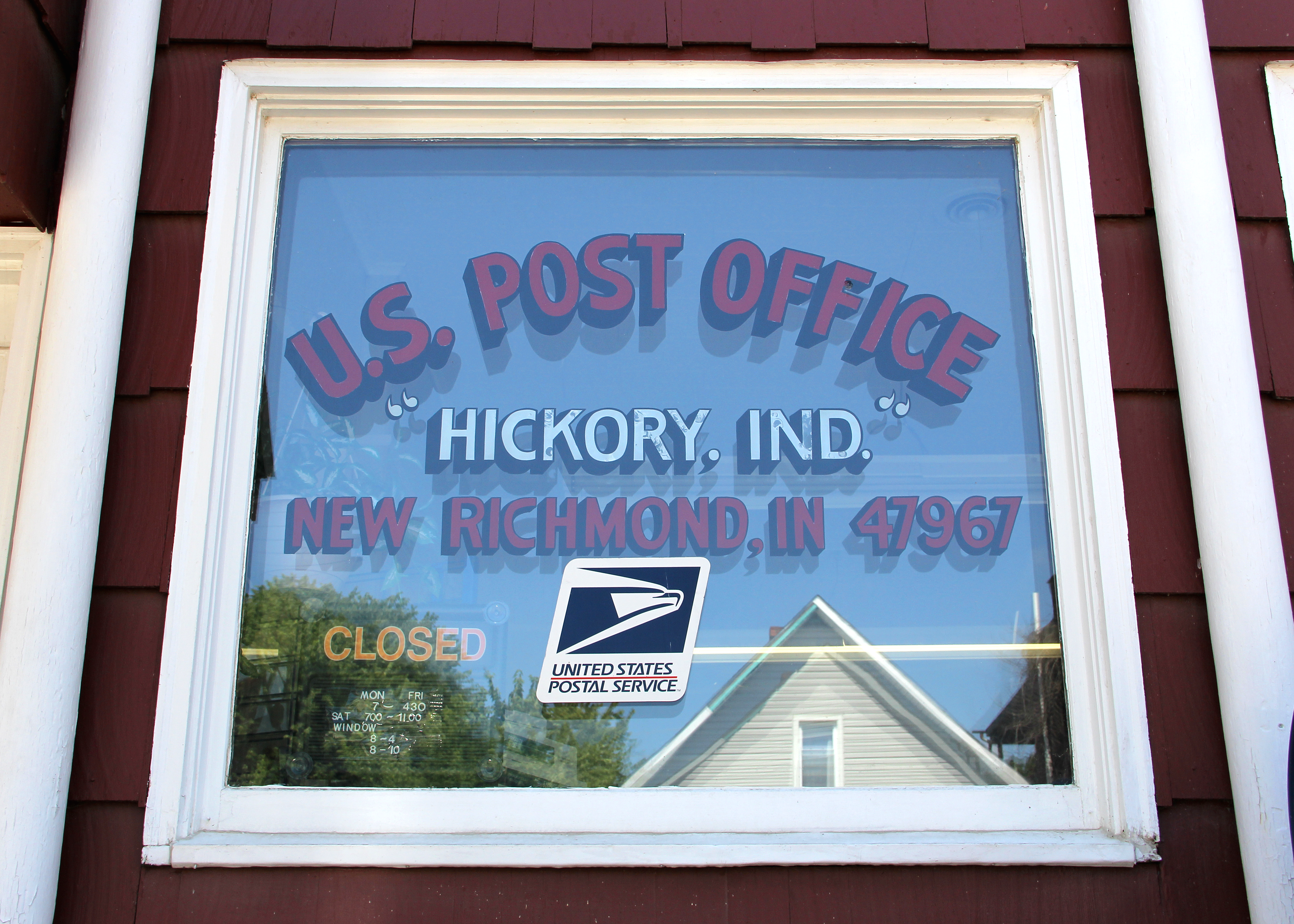
The post office for New Richmond and "Hickory"

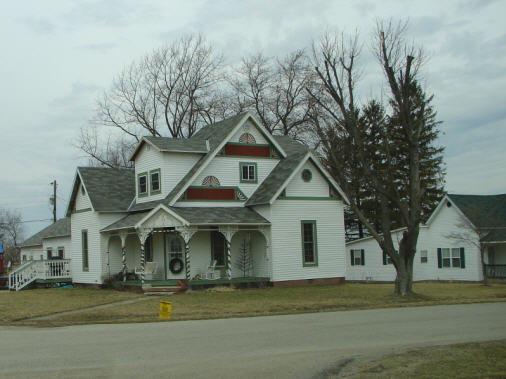
A house in New Richmond

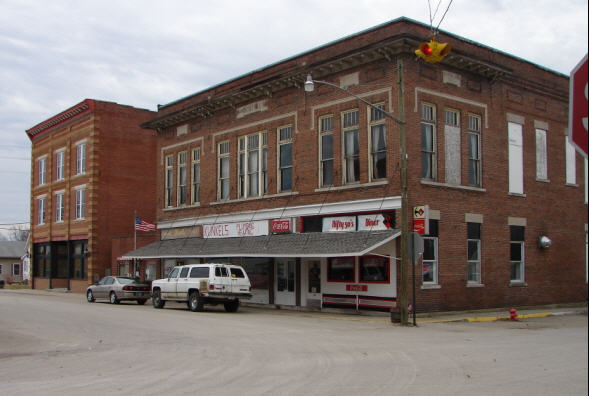
The downtown area
