= Sugar Creek Township, Montgomery County, Indiana =

Sugar Creek Township
- Township
- Location in Montgomery County
- Coordinates: 40°10′44″N 86°45′42″W
- Country: United States
- State: Indiana
- County: Montgomery

Government
  - Type: Indiana township

Area
  - Total: 33.83 sq mi (87.6 km^{2})
  - Land: 33.83 sq mi (87.6 km^{2})
  - Water: 0 sq mi (0 km^{2}) 0%
- Elevation: 804 ft (245 m)

Population (2020)
  - Total: 376
  - Density: 11.1/sq mi (4.29/km^{2})
- Time zone: UTC-5 (Eastern (EST))
  - Summer (DST): UTC-4 (EDT)
- ZIP codes: 46035, 47930, 47933, 47940, 47955
- Area code: 765
- GNIS feature ID: 453883

Sugar Creek Township is one of eleven townships in Montgomery County, Indiana, United States. As of the 2020 census, its population was 376 (down from 448 at 2010) and it contained 160 housing units.

== History ==
William Fisher Polygonal Barn was listed on the National Register of Historic Places in 1993.

== Geography ==
According to the 2010 census, the township has a total area of 33.83 square miles (87.6 km^{2}), all land.

=== Unincorporated towns ===
- Bowers at 40.156983°N 86.724728°W

=== Cemeteries ===
The township contains these four cemeteries: Bowers, Clouser, Peterson and Rice.

== School districts ==
- North Montgomery School Corporation

== Political districts ==
- Indiana's 4th congressional district
- State House District 41
- State Senate District 23
