= Waynetown, Indiana =

- Town
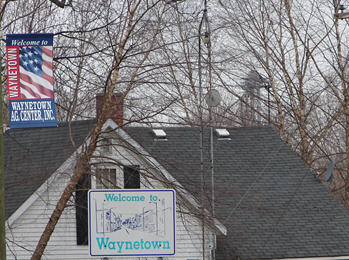
- Motto: "You'll never find another one!"
- Location in Montgomery County
- Coordinates: 40°05′17″N 87°03′56″W
- Country: United States
- State: Indiana
- County: Montgomery
- Township: Wayne

Area
  - Total: 0.44 sq mi (1.15 km^{2})
  - Land: 0.44 sq mi (1.15 km^{2})
  - Water: 0 sq mi (0.00 km^{2})
- Elevation: 755 ft (230 m)

Population (2020)
  - Total: 960
  - Density: 2,160/sq mi (833/km^{2})
- Time zone: UTC-5 (Eastern (EST))
  - Summer (DST): UTC-4 (EDT)
- ZIP code: 47990
- Area code: 765
- FIPS code: 18-82052
- GNIS feature ID: 2397727
- Website: www.waynetown.net

Waynetown is a town in Wayne Township, Montgomery County, in the U.S. state of Indiana. The population was 960 at the 2020 census.

== History ==
Waynetown was platted as "Middletown" by Samuel Mann in 1830.

== Geography ==
Waynetown is located in western Montgomery County. U.S. Route 136 passes through the center of town as Washington Street, leading east-southeast 9 miles (14 km) to Crawfordsville, the county seat, and west-northwest 11 miles (18 km) to Veedersburg. Indiana State Road 25 joins US 136 through the center of Waynetown but leads north 6 miles (10 km) to Wingate and south 4 miles (6 km) to its terminus at State Road 32.

According to the U.S. Census Bureau, Waynetown has a total area of 0.45 square miles (1.17 km^{2}), all land. The East Fork of Coal Creek runs through the town, flowing west to Coal Creek and then southwest to the Wabash River at Cayuga.

== Demographics ==
Historical population
Census	Pop.	Note	%±
1880	569		—
1890	576		1.2%
1900	757		31.4%
1910	734		−3.0%
1920	691		−5.9%
1930	664		−3.9%
1940	644		−3.0%
1950	658		2.2%
1960	933		41.8%
1970	993		6.4%
1980	915		−7.9%
1990	911		−0.4%
2000	909		−0.2%
2010	958		5.4%
2020	960		0.2%
U.S. Decennial Census

=== 2010 census ===
As of the census of 2010, there were 1007 people, 391 households, and 282 families living in the town. The population density was 1,995.8 inhabitants per square mile (770.6/km^{2}). There were 436 housing units at an average density of 908.3 per square mile (350.7/km^{2}). The racial makeup of the town was 98.3% White, 0.2% African American, 0.4% from other races, and 1.0% from two or more races. Hispanic or Latino of any race were 2.0% of the population.

There were 391 households, of which 36.8% had children under the age of 18 living with them, 54.0% were married couples living together, 12.0% had a female householder with no husband present, 6.1% had a male householder with no wife present, and 27.9% were non-families. 24.8% of all households were made up of individuals, and 9.5% had someone living alone who was 65 years of age or older. The average household size was 2.45 and the average family size was 2.88.

The median age in the town was 37.1 years. 26.6% of residents were under the age of 18; 8.4% were between the ages of 18 and 24; 24.4% were from 25 to 44; 25.2% were from 45 to 64; and 15.4% were 65 years of age or older. The gender makeup of the town was 48.4% male and 51.6% female.

=== 2000 census ===
As of the census of 2000, there were 909 people, 372 households, and 265 families living in the town. The population density was 2,085.8 inhabitants per square mile (805.3/km^{2}). There were 411 housing units at an average density of 943.1 per square mile (364.1/km^{2}). The racial makeup of the town was 99.34% White, 0.11% African American, and 0.55% from two or more races. Hispanic or Latino of any race were 0.44% of the population.

There were 372 households, out of which 32.3% had children under the age of 18 living with them, 56.2% were married couples living together, 9.9% had a female householder with no husband present, and 28.5% were non-families. 25.8% of all households were made up of individuals, and 16.7% had someone living alone who was 65 years of age or older. The average household size was 2.44 and the average family size was 2.91.

In the town, the population was spread out, with 27.3% under the age of 18, 6.6% from 18 to 24, 29.2% from 25 to 44, 21.3% from 45 to 64, and 15.6% who were 65 years of age or older. The median age was 35 years. For every 100 females, there were 94.6 males. For every 100 females age 18 and over, there were 91.6 males.

The median income for a household in the town was $37,188, and the median income for a family was $44,191. Males had a median income of $35,313 versus $21,287 for females. The per capita income for the town was $16,328. About 5.9% of families and 8.6% of the population were below the poverty line, including 6.9% of those under age 18 and 13.1% of those age 65 or over.

== Government ==
Waynetown has an elected five-member council which oversees many of the town functions, from grants through utilities, to park and recreation. The town also employs a police department which is made up of numerous deputies and a town marshal. Waynetown has its own utility department, which runs the town utilities and takes care of cleanup throughout the town. The town has two local associations who help oversee the town activities.

== Local festivities ==
Each year the town of Waynetown holds five festivals. In May the town has a Street Festival in downtown Waynetown. The rest of the festivals take play at Rev. Guy Tremaine Park. The last Saturday in June is the Freedom Festival. The Fish Fry is early September and includes a carnival. The Fish Fry brings in many across the county, as well as from surrounding counties such as Fountain, Tippecanoe, and Parke.It is the longest continual festival in Montgomery County. In October the town hosts the Oktoberfest and Fall Festival. In December the town has Christmas in the Park which is a month-long celebration at the well decorated Rev. Guy Tramaine Park.

== Connection to Lewis and Clark Expedition ==
William Bratton (1778–1841), a member of the Lewis and Clark Expedition, settled in the Waynetown area in 1822 and "held various local county and township offices, including Justice of the Peace." He is buried in the Old Pioneer Cemetery within Waynetown.

== Education ==
North Montgomery School Corporation serves Waynetown. Elementary students are zoned to Sommer Elementary School. Secondary school students attend North Montgomery Middle School and North Montgomery High School.

== Gallery ==
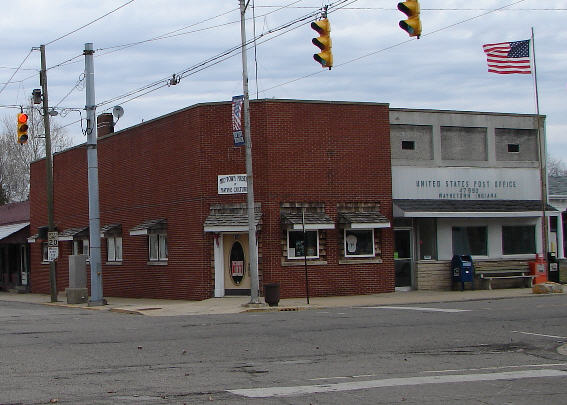
Red brick building is now an art gallery named The Nest. The lighter brick building is the post office

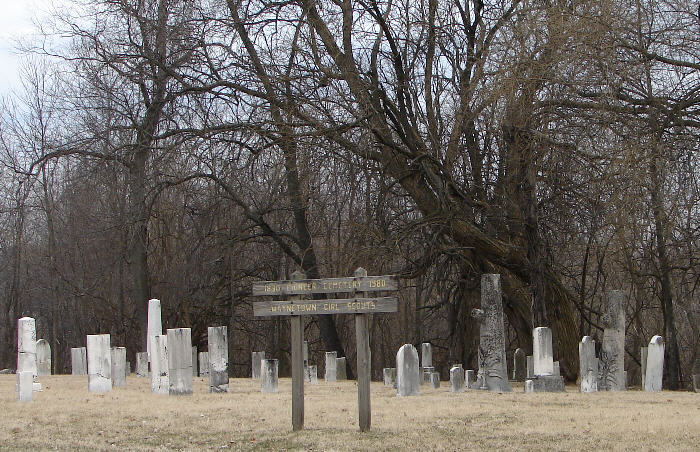
1830 Pioneer Cemetery

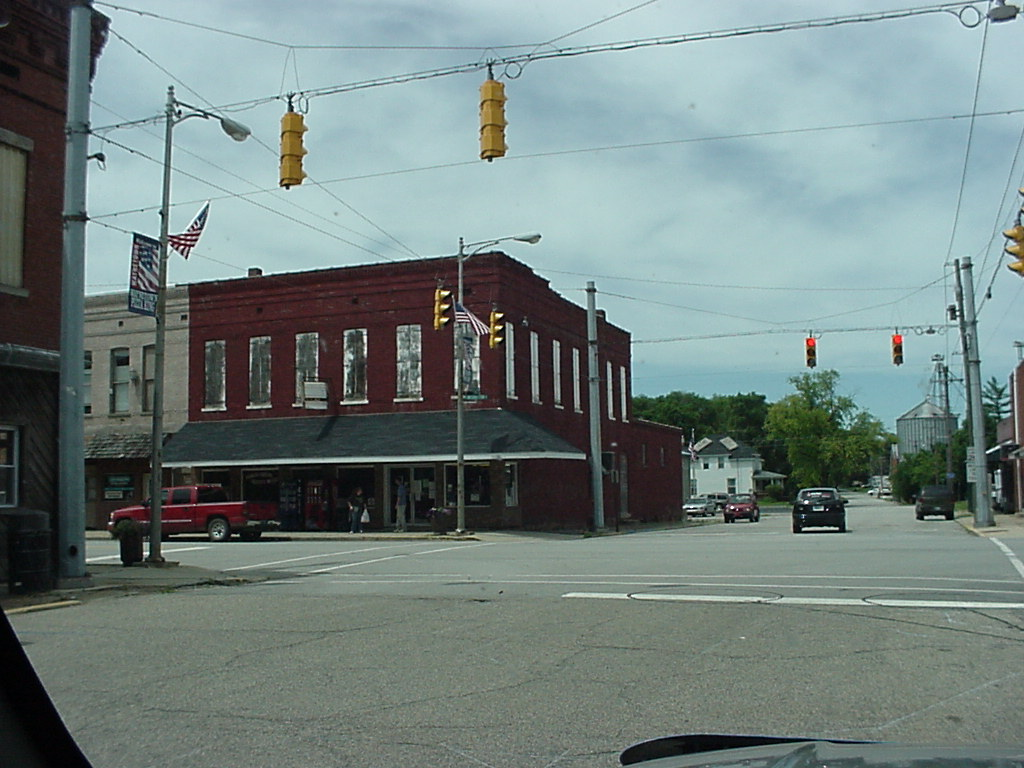
Gregg's Corner Market
