= Elmdale, Indiana =

- Unincorporated community
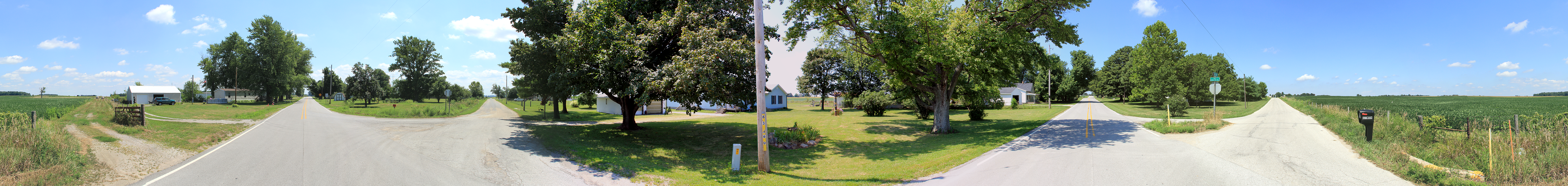
- The corner of Old 55 and County Road 600 West.

- Location in Montgomery County
- Coordinates: 40°08′12″N 87°01′03″W
- Country: United States
- State: Indiana
- County: Montgomery
- Township: Coal Creek
- Elevation: 827 ft (252 m)
- Time zone: UTC-5 (Eastern (EST))
  - Summer (DST): UTC-4 (EDT)
- ZIP code: 47933
- Area code: 765
- FIPS code: 18-20890
- GNIS feature ID: 434127

Elmdale is an unincorporated community in Coal Creek Township, Montgomery County, in the U.S. state of Indiana.

== History ==
Elmdale was originally known under the name Boston Store. The name was later changed to Elmdale, likely due to the abundance of elm trees in the area.

A post office was established under the name Boston Store in 1866, was renamed Elmdale in 1882, and remained in operation until it was discontinued in 1905.
