= Bowers, Indiana =

- Unincorporated community
- Location in Montgomery County
- Coordinates: 40°09′25″N 86°43′29″W
- Country: United States
- State: Indiana
- County: Montgomery
- Township: Sugar Creek
- Elevation: 814 ft (248 m)
- Time zone: UTC-5 (Eastern (EST))
  - Summer (DST): UTC-4 (EDT)
- ZIP code: 47940
- Area code: 765
- FIPS code: 18-06796
- GNIS feature ID: 431396

Bowers is an unincorporated community in Sugar Creek Township, Montgomery County, in the U.S. state of Indiana.

== History ==
Bowers was platted by Christina and L. M. Dunbar in 1901. L. M. Dunbar was Lewis Morton Dunbar. Bowers was originally named "Bowers Station" and was a railroad stop.

== Education ==
Previously Bowers had its own elementary school, while high school students went to school in Darlington. In 1959, the Bowers elementary school merged into the Darlington Elementary School.
