= Linden station (Indiana) =

- Linden Depot
- U.S. National Register of Historic Places
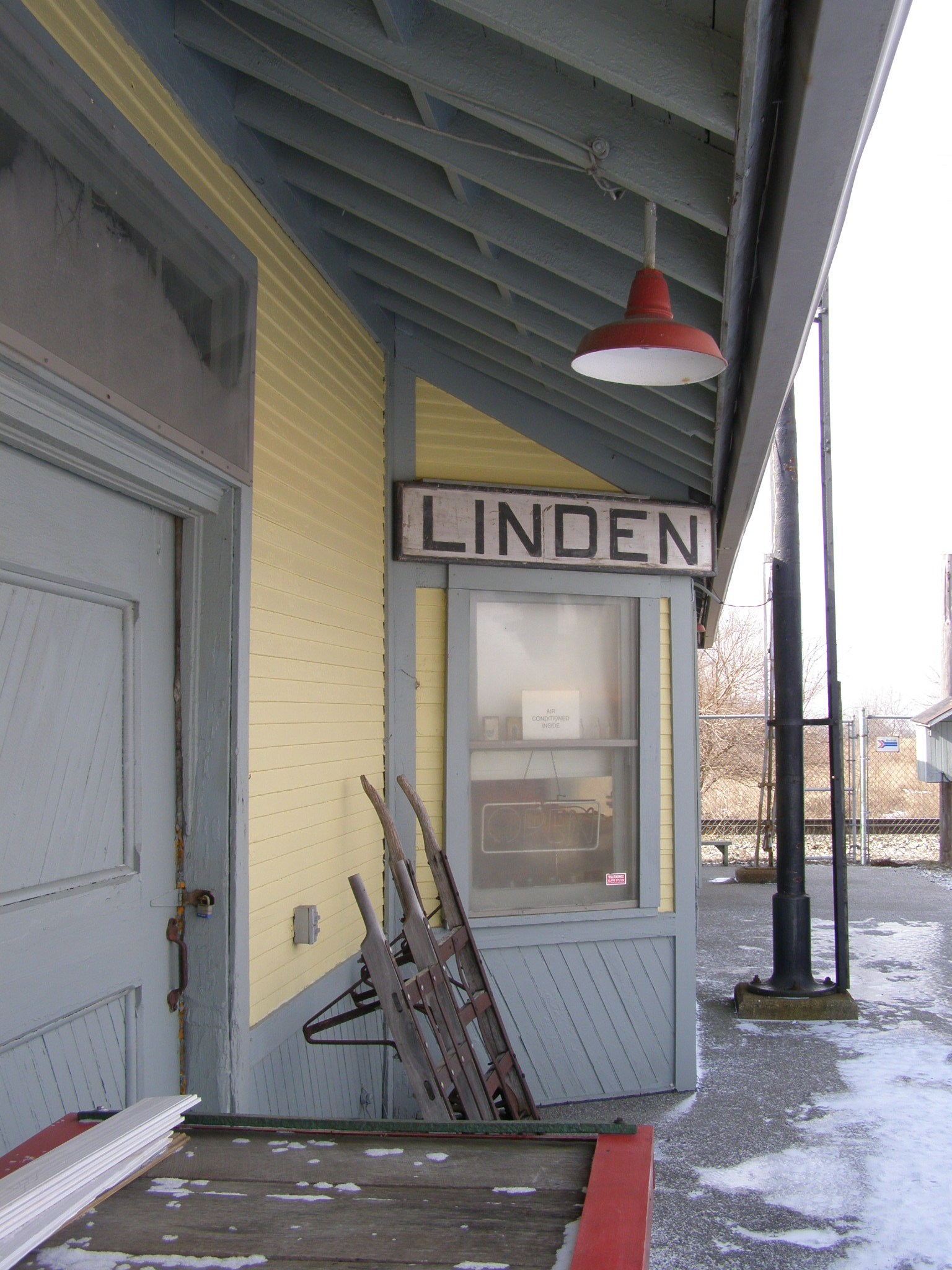
- Linden Depot

- Location within Indiana Location within the United States
- Location: 202 N. James St., Linden, Indiana, United States
- Coordinates: 40°11′35″N 86°54′17″W
- Area: less than one acre
- Built: 1905
- Architectural style: Bungalow/craftsman
- NRHP reference No.: 90001781
- Added to NRHP: November 28, 1990

Linden Depot is a historic train station located at Linden, Indiana. In 1852 the New Albany and Salem Railroad (later Monon) Railroad cut through Montgomery County, Indiana. The old stage road between Crawfordsville and Linden was given to the railroad as an inducement to get them to build through Linden. 1852 also saw the building of the first Linden depot, on a site behind the present day Post Office. The building was moved to the current location in 1881 when the Toledo, St. Louis and Western Railroad was built through Linden, crossing the Monon at this location.

It was listed on the National Register of Historic Places in 1990.

== Museum ==
Located in the disused Monon Railroad Station, the Linden Museum is run by the Linden-Madison Township Historical Society. The museum is a joint venture between the Linden-Madison Township Historical Society and the Monon Railroad Historical/Technical Society.

Preceding station	Monon Railroad	Following station
Romney toward Chicago	Main Line	Manchester toward Louisville
Preceding station	Nickel Plate Road	Following station
New Richmond toward St. Louis	St. Louis – Toledo	Clarks Hill toward Toledo
