= Linden, Indiana =

- Town
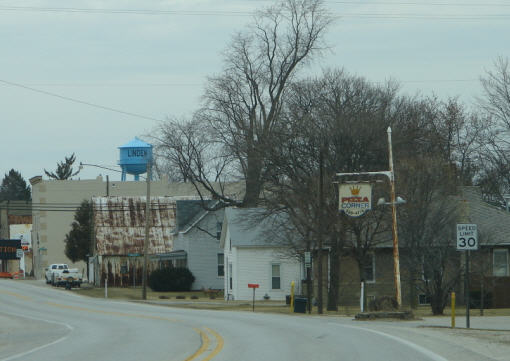

- Logo

- Location in Montgomery County
- Coordinates: 40°11′20″N 86°54′08″W
- Country: United States
- State: Indiana
- County: Montgomery
- Township: Madison

Area
  - Total: 0.39 sq mi (1.01 km^{2})
  - Land: 0.39 sq mi (1.01 km^{2})
  - Water: 0 sq mi (0.00 km^{2})
- Elevation: 791 ft (241 m)

Population (2020)
  - Total: 711
  - Density: 1,819.9/sq mi (702.68/km^{2})
- Time zone: UTC-5 (Eastern (EST))
  - Summer (DST): UTC-4 (EDT)
- ZIP code: 47955
- Area code: 765
- FIPS code: 18-44082
- GNIS feature ID: 2396718
- Website: www.linden.in.gov

Linden is a town in Madison Township, Montgomery County, in the U.S. state of Indiana. The population was 711 at the 2020 census.

== History ==
Linden was platted in 1852 when the railroad was extended to that point. A post office has been in operation at Linden since 1851.

Linden Depot was listed on the National Register of Historic Places in 1990.

== Geography ==
Linden is located in northern Montgomery County. U.S. Route 231 passes through the town as Main Street, leading south 10 miles (16 km) to Crawfordsville, the county seat, and north 16 miles (26 km) to Lafayette.

According to the U.S. Census Bureau, Linden has a total area of 0.39 square miles (1.01 km^{2}), all land.

== Demographics ==
Historical population
Census	Pop.	Note	%±
1880	130		—
1900	572		—
1910	556		−2.8%
1920	555		−0.2%
1930	541		−2.5%
1940	580		7.2%
1950	590		1.7%
1960	619		4.9%
1970	713		15.2%
1980	700		−1.8%
1990	718		2.6%
2000	700		−2.5%
2010	759		8.4%
2020	711		−6.3%
U.S. Decennial Census

=== 2010 census ===
As of the census of 2010, there were 759 people, 301 households, and 202 families living in the town. The population density was 1,807.1 inhabitants per square mile (697.7/km^{2}). There were 329 housing units at an average density of 783.3 per square mile (302.4/km^{2}). The racial makeup of the town was 97.1% White, 0.5% African American, 0.9% Native American, 0.1% from other races, and 1.3% from two or more races. Hispanic or Latino of any race were 1.7% of the population.

There were 301 households, of which 34.6% had children under the age of 18 living with them, 48.2% were married couples living together, 12.3% had a female householder with no husband present, 6.6% had a male householder with no wife present, and 32.9% were non-families. 28.6% of all households were made up of individuals, and 9% had someone living alone who was 65 years of age or older. The average household size was 2.52 and the average family size was 3.03.

The median age in the town was 34 years. 29.2% of residents were under the age of 18; 8.4% were between the ages of 18 and 24; 23.9% were from 25 to 44; 25.9% were from 45 to 64; and 12.6% were 65 years of age or older. The gender makeup of the town was 51.0% male and 49.0% female.

=== 2000 census ===
As of the census of 2000, there were 700 people, 302 households, and 202 families living in the town. The population density was 2,703.8 inhabitants per square mile (1,043.9/km^{2}). There were 321 housing units at an average density of 1,239.9 per square mile (478.7/km^{2}). The racial makeup of the town was 98.14% White, 0.29% African American, 0.57% Native American, and 1.00% from two or more races. Hispanic or Latino of any race were 0.43% of the population.

There were 302 households, out of which 34.1% had children under the age of 18 living with them, 54.0% were married couples living together, 7.9% had a female householder with no husband present, and 33.1% were non-families. 27.8% of all households were made up of individuals, and 11.9% had someone living alone who was 65 years of age or older. The average household size was 2.32 and the average family size was 2.80.

In the town, the population was spread out, with 25.6% under the age of 18, 6.6% from 18 to 24, 31.0% from 25 to 44, 23.0% from 45 to 64, and 13.9% who were 65 years of age or older. The median age was 38 years. For every 100 females, there were 97.7 males. For every 100 females age 18 and over, there were 91.5 males.

The median income for a household in the town was $36,750, and the median income for a family was $41,696. Males had a median income of $32,955 versus $22,679 for females. The per capita income for the town was $16,733. About 3.9% of families and 5.0% of the population were below the poverty line, including 6.0% of those under age 18 and 8.4% of those age 65 or over.

== Education ==
North Montgomery School Corporation serves Linden. Elementary students are zoned to Pleasant Hill Elementary School. Secondary school students attend Northridge Middle School and North Montgomery High School. North Montgomery High School lies south of Linden and is attended by students from several surrounding communities.

The town has a lending library, the Linden Carnegie Public Library.

== Notable people ==
- Larry Rice, Indy car driver

== Gallery ==
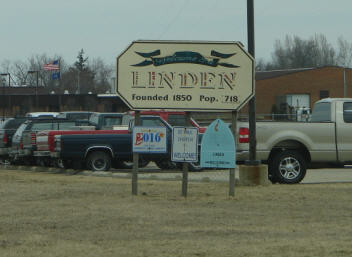
Welcome sign

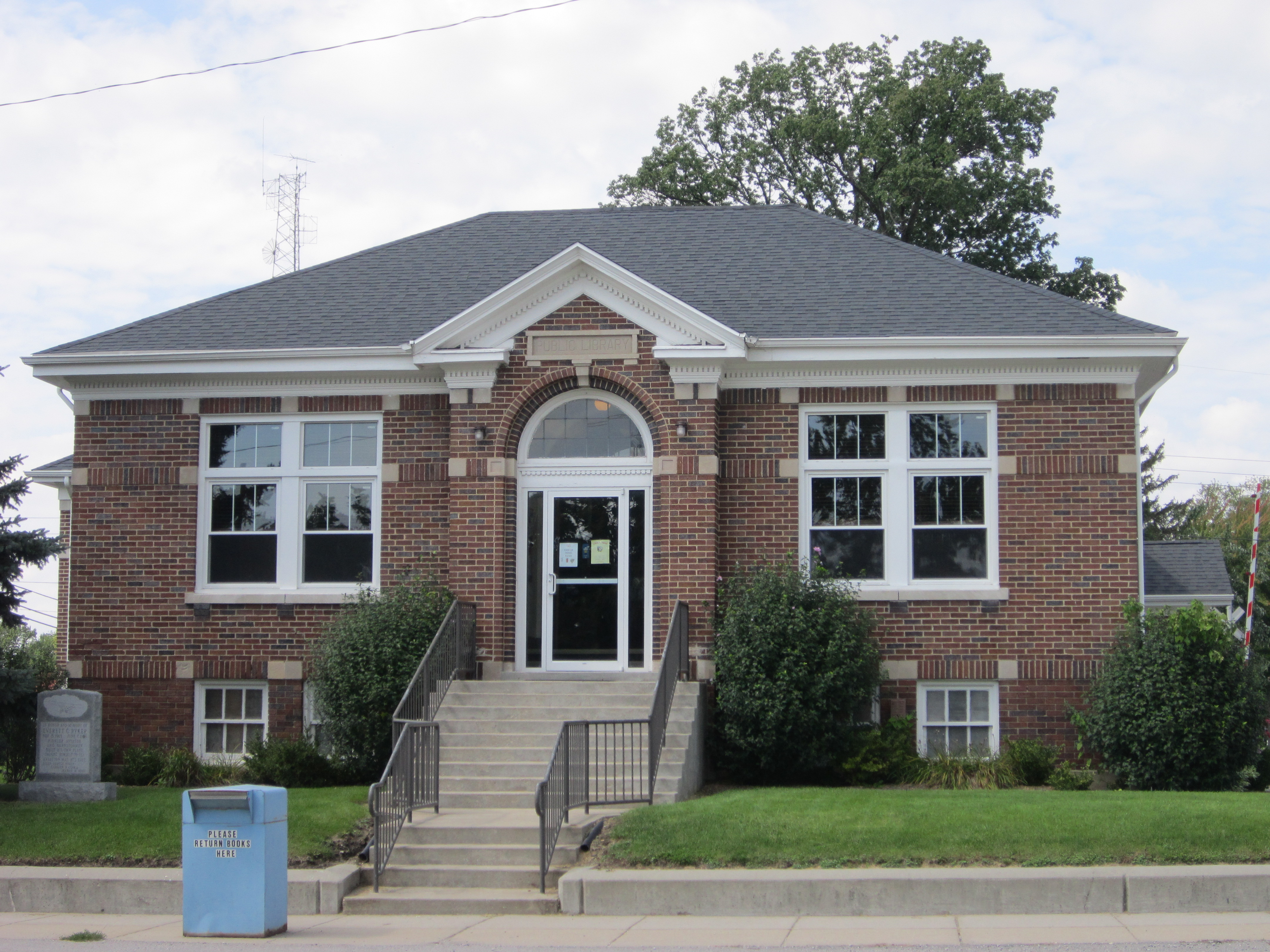
Linden Public Library

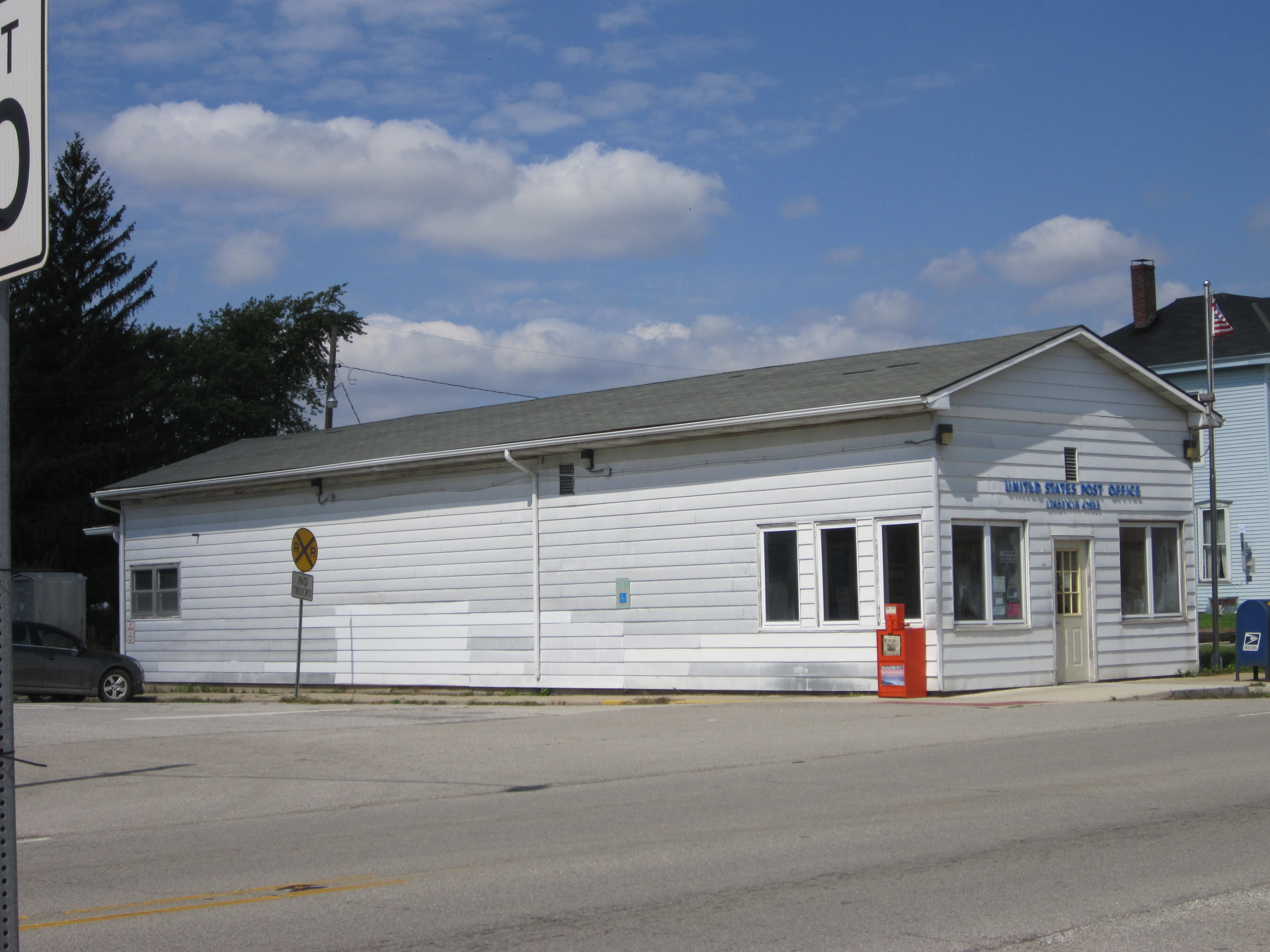
Linden US Post Office

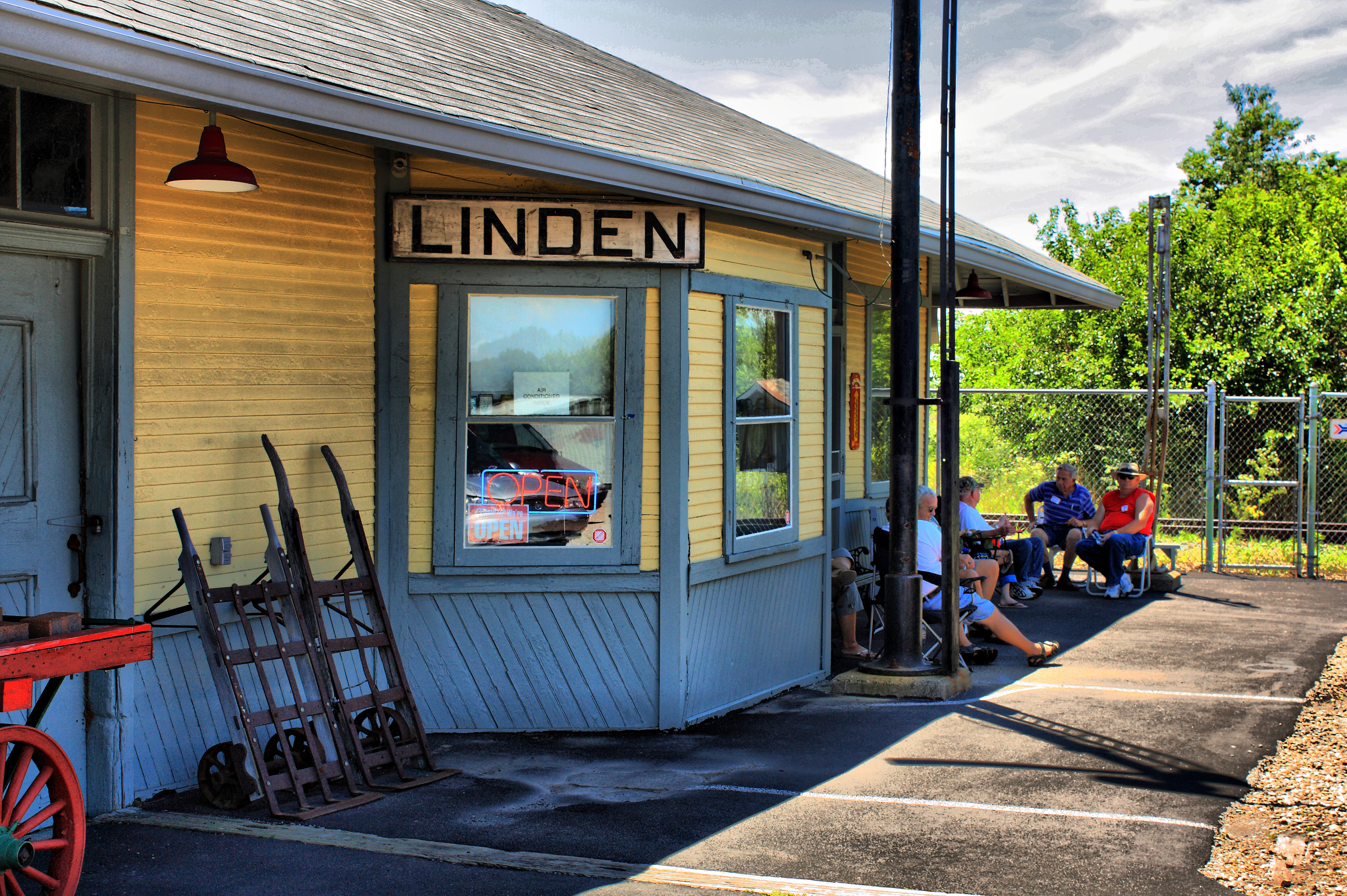
The Linden Depot

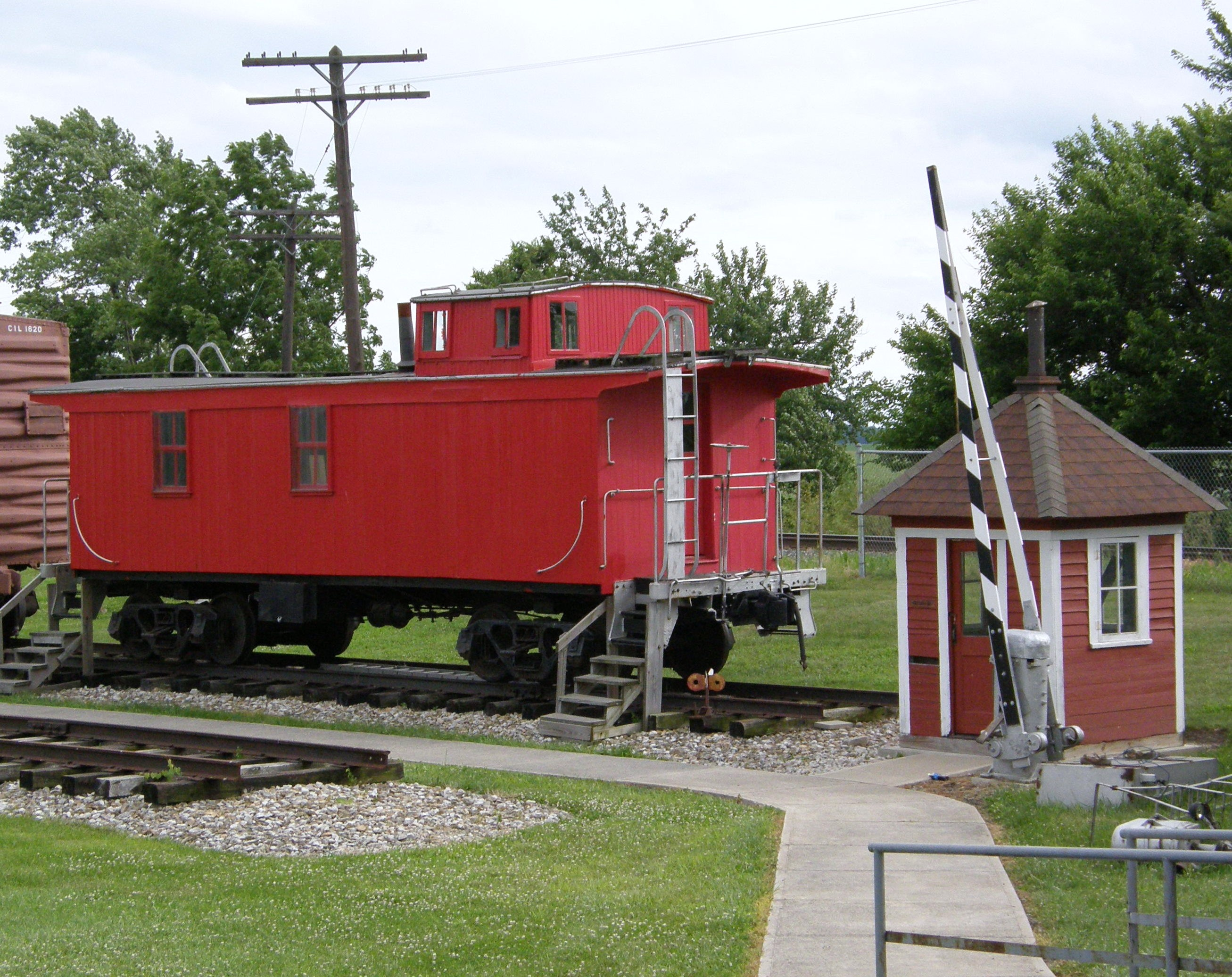
Monon Caboose
