= Ripley =

Ripley may refer to:

== People and characters ==
- Ripley (name)
- Ripley, the test mannequin aboard the first International Space Station Dragon 2 space test flight Crew Dragon Demo-1
- Ellen Ripley, a fictional character from the Alien sci-fi–horror franchise
- Jack Ripley, pen name of John Wainwright (author)
- Tom Ripley, a fictional character in a series of crime novels by Patricia Highsmith and their adaptations
  - Ripley (TV series), a 2024 miniseries adaptation

== Places ==
=== England ===
- Ripley, Derbyshire
- Ripley, Hampshire, a hamlet in Sopley parish
- Ripley, North Yorkshire
- Ripley, Surrey

=== United States ===
- Ripley, California
- Ripley, Georgia
- Ripley, Illinois
- Ripley, Indiana
- Ripley, Maine
- Ripley, Maryland
- Ripley, Michigan
- Ripley, Mississippi
- Ripley, Independence, Missouri
- Ripley, New York, a town
  - Ripley (CDP), New York, a census-designated place in the town
- Ripley, Ohio
- Ripley, Oklahoma
- Ripley, Tennessee
- Ripley, West Virginia
- Old Ripley, Illinois
- Ripley County, Indiana
- Ripley County, Missouri
- Ripley Township, Dodge County, Minnesota
- Ripley Township, Morrison County, Minnesota

=== Other countries ===
- Ripley, Queensland, Australia
- Ripley, Ontario, Canada

=== Other places ===
- Camp Ripley, a military and civilian training facility near Little Falls, Minnesota, U.S.
- Ripley Castle, Yorkshire, England, UK
- Ripley (crater), a crater on Pluto's moon Charon
- Ripley Formation, a geological formation in the U.S. states of Alabama, Georgia, Mississippi, Missouri, and Tennessee

== Other uses ==
- Ripley machine gun
- Ripley S.A., Chilean retailer
- Ripley St Thomas Church of England Academy
- The Ripley, a fictional virus appearing in the Stephen King novel Dreamcatcher

== See also ==
- Ripley's Believe It or Not! ("Ripley's"), an American franchise founded by Robert Ripley
- Fort Ripley (disambiguation)
- Ripley County (disambiguation)
- Ripley High School (disambiguation)
- Ripley Historic District (disambiguation)
- Ripley House (disambiguation)
- Ripley Township (disambiguation)
