= Ripley Township, Indiana =

Ripley Township, Indiana may refer to one of the following places:

- Ripley Township, Montgomery County, Indiana
- Ripley Township, Rush County, Indiana

Not to be confused with: Riley Township, Vigo County, Indiana

== See also ==
- Ripley Township (disambiguation)
