= Liberty County Jail =

- U.S. National Register of Historic Places
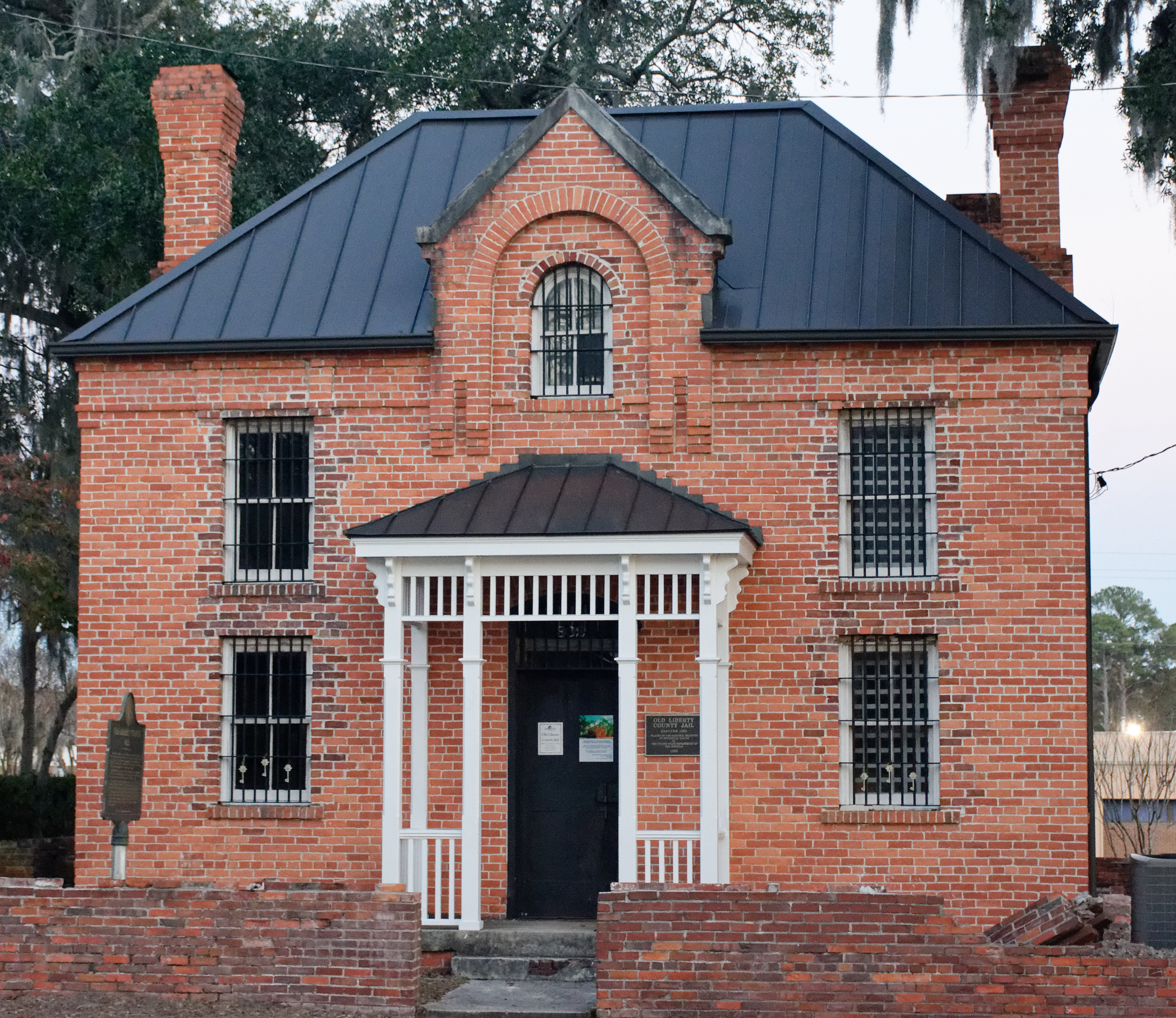
- Liberty County Jail in 2014

- Location within Georgia Location within the United States
- Location: 302 South Main Street; Hinesville, Georgia 31313
- Coordinates: 31.84558°N 81.59650°W
- Area: less than one acre
- Built: October 1892
- Architectural style: Vernacular; Late Victorian
- NRHP reference No.: 92001036
- Added to NRHP: August 18, 1992

The Liberty County Jail is a historical building in Hinesville, Georgia, built in 1892. It was added to the National Register of Historic Places in 1992.

== History ==
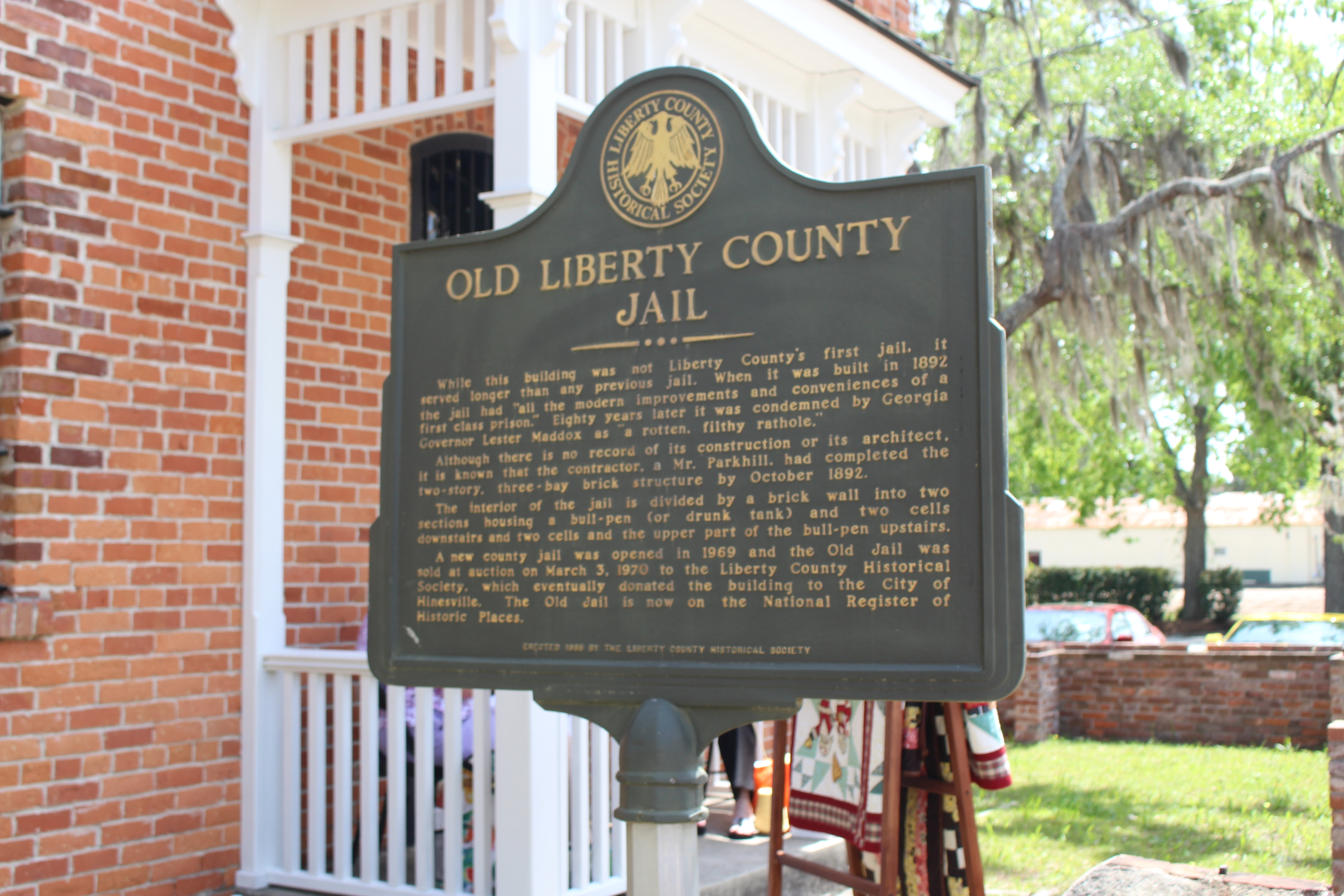
Historical marker for the Liberty County Jail

Construction of the building was completed in October 1892 by a general contractor named Parkhill. Much of the information regarding the construction of the building is currently unknown. The two-story brick building was built to replace a one-story wooden jail. The building is located at what would have been at the time, of its construction, the southern edge of Hinesville, which was the county seat of Liberty County, Georgia. The building is one of the oldest brick buildings in both Hinesville and Liberty County. It underwent a slight renovation in 1916, with several repairs made to its structure. In 1941, heaters were installed replacing two fireplaces in the jail.

By the 1960s, the building was starting to deteriorate. In 1964, county commissioners recommended building a new county jail, which was approved in 1968. In 1970, construction of the new county jail was completed, with the Georgia governor at the time Lester Maddox calling the old structure "a rotten, filthy rathole." On March 3 the building was sold at an auction. The Liberty County Historical Society purchased the old structure for $4,500. The historical society later donated the building to the city of Hinesville. Prior to this, the society had performed some preservation activities on the structure that included removing the building's white paint exterior, and restoring its natural brick exterior. In 1992, the building was added to the National Register of Historic Places. Currently, the building is being operated as a free museum by the city.

== Architecture ==
According to the building's NRHP listing, the building is an example of vernacular architecture with elements of late Victorian architecture. Historically, the jail would have been painted white, but preservationists returned the building to its red brick exterior via sandblasting after the jail closed. There is a considerable amount of prisoner graffiti on the cell walls. According to restoration documentation, the jail is a "significant example of a late 19th century jail for an agricultural county and a small, but growing, community in Georgia."

The building is a two-story building designed in a "stubby T" shape, with a width of 64 feet (20 m) and a length of 75 feet (23 m). The building originally sported a tin roof that was replaced by roof shingles. A 3 ft (0.91 m) tall brick fence surrounds the building.

== See also ==
- National Register of Historic Places listings in Liberty County, Georgia
