= Ripley House =

Ripley House may refer to:

== United Kingdom ==
- Ripley Castle, North Yorkshire
- Ripley House, in Streatham Common, Lambeth, London

== United States ==
- Ripley Intaglios, listed on the NRHP in La Paz County, Arizona
- Sam Ripley Farm, listed on the NRHP in Liberty County, Georgia
- Lafayette G. Ripley House, a Michigan State Historic Sites in Muskegon County, Michigan
- Smith-Ripley House and museum, listed on the NRHP in Jefferson County, New York
- Ripley House (Worthington, Ohio), listed on the NRHP in Franklin County, Ohio
- Ripley Stone House, Afton, Tennessee, listed on the NRHP in Greene County, Tennessee
- Ripley House, a community center in East End, Houston, Texas
- Ripley House, part of the Grace and Pearl Historic District, listed on the NRHP in Walworth County, Wisconsin
