= General Ripley =

General Ripley may refer to:

- Brig. Gen. Eleazer Wheelock Ripley, United States Army, active during the War of 1812
- Brig. Gen. James Wolfe Ripley, United States Army, active during the American Civil War
- Brig. Gen. Roswell S. Ripley, Confederate States Army
- Brevet Brig. Gen. Edward H. Ripley, United States Army, active during the American Civil War

== See also ==
- Ripley (disambiguation)
- Ripley (name)
