= Bacon-Fraser House =

Historic house in Georgia, United States

- U.S. National Register of Historic Places
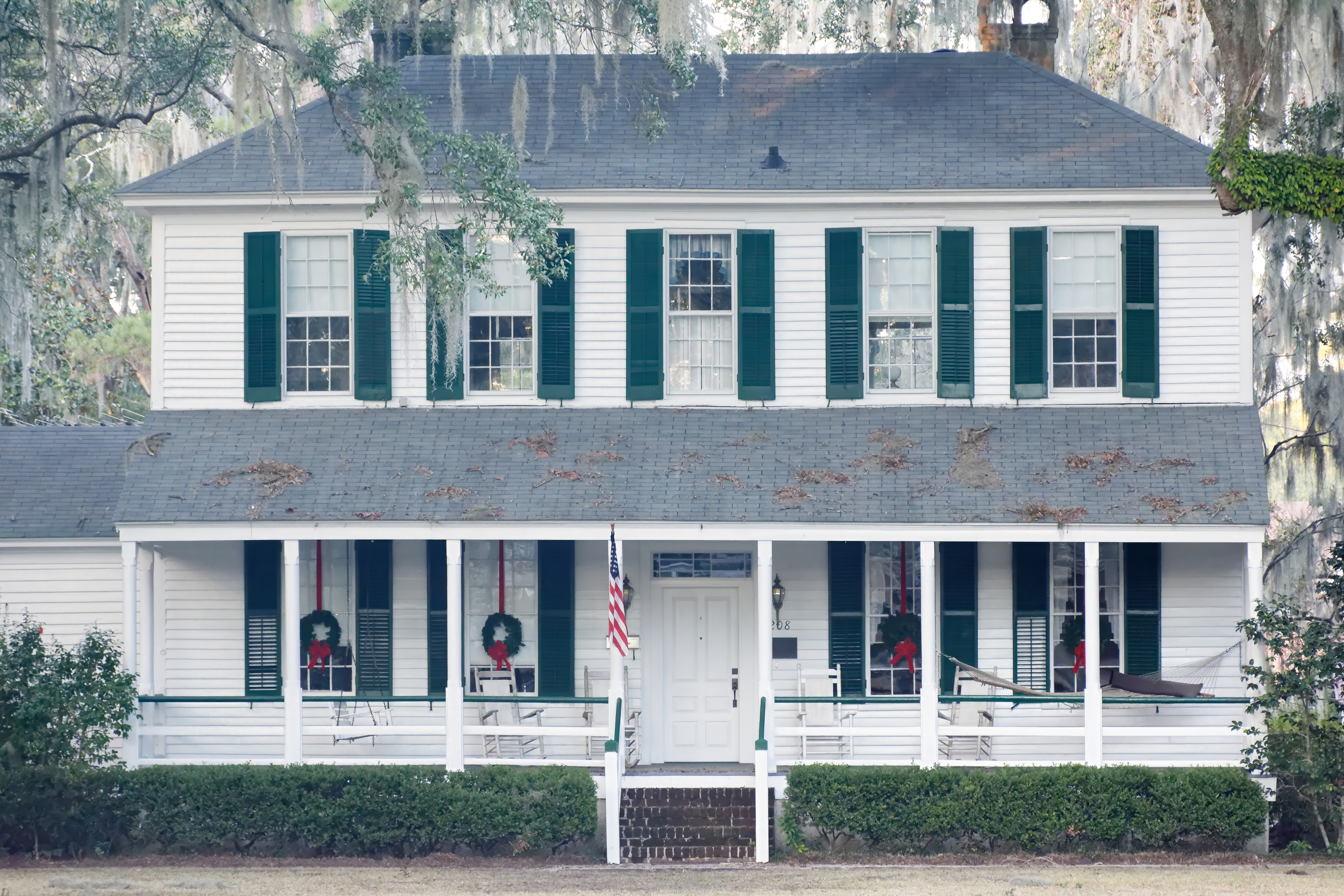
- Bacon-Fraser House in 2014

- Location within Georgia
- Location: 208 E. Court St., Hinesville, Georgia
- Coordinates: 31°50′53″N 81°35′37″W
- Area: 3.5 acres (1.4 ha)
- Built: 1839
- Architectural style: Plantation Plain
- NRHP reference No.: 85000848
- Added to NRHP: April 18, 1985

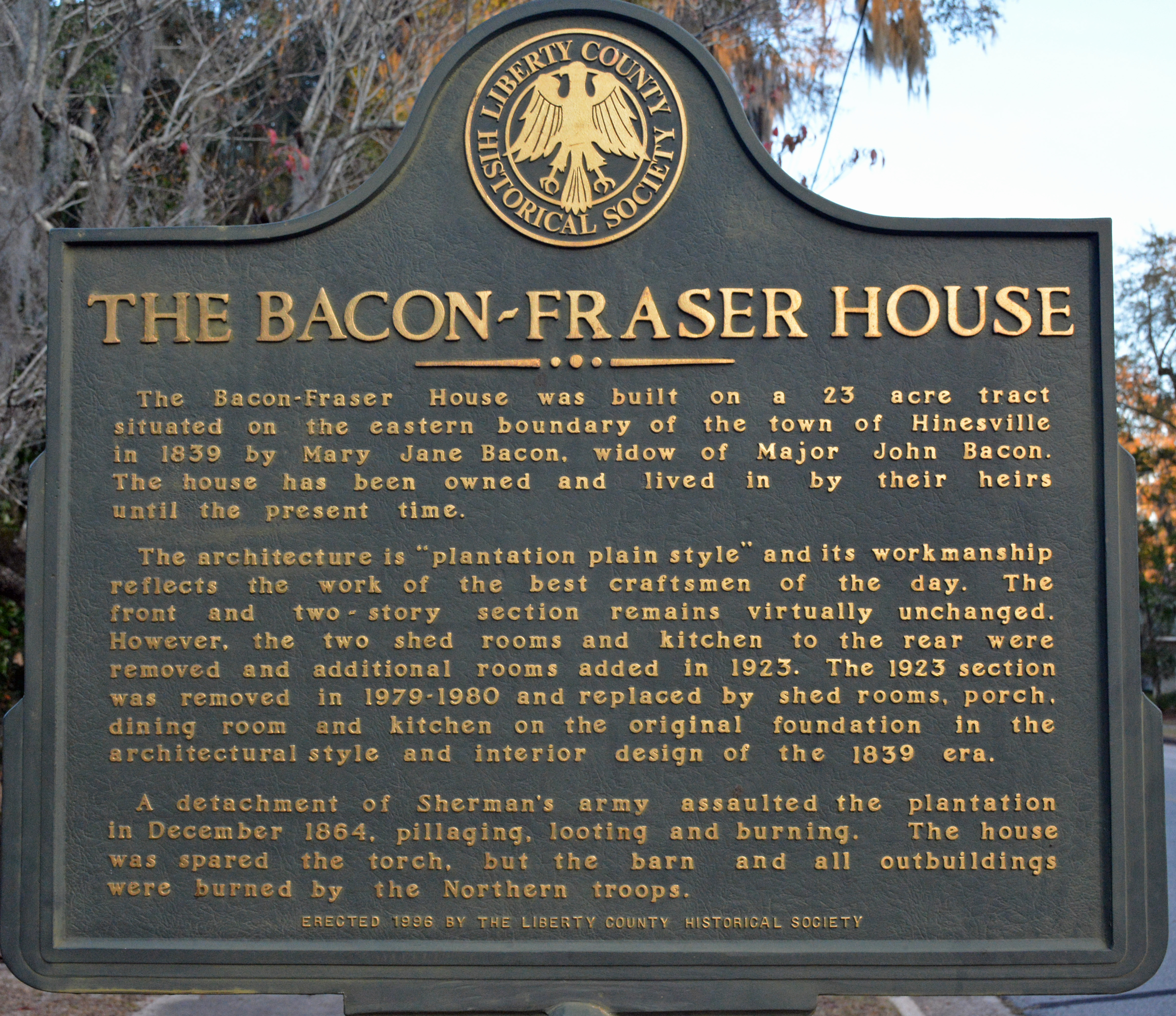
Historical marker

The Bacon-Fraser House is a historic home in Hinesville, Georgia in Liberty County, Georgia, built in 1839, two years after Hinesville was founded. It is a two-story Plantation Plain style house with weatherboard sides. The house is raised and rests on Savannah brick piers. A rear shed room and ell addition was added in 1979, built on foundations that are believed to have been original to rear rooms that were removed in 1923.

During the American Civil War, General Sherman's army occupied the plantation in 1864, pillaged it, and burned the outbuildings.

In 1980, Savannah Landscape Architect Clermont Huger Lee designed a period appropriate planting plan for residence area. Coincidentally, Lee's niece married a descendant of the Bacon-Fraser's.

The site was added to the National Register of Historic Places in 1985. It is the only building surviving from Hinesville's early settlement period. The house is far back from Court Street but there is a historical marker near the street.

== See also ==
- National Register of Historic Places listings in Liberty County, Georgia
