= National Register of Historic Places listings in Liberty County, Georgia =

Location of Liberty County in Georgia

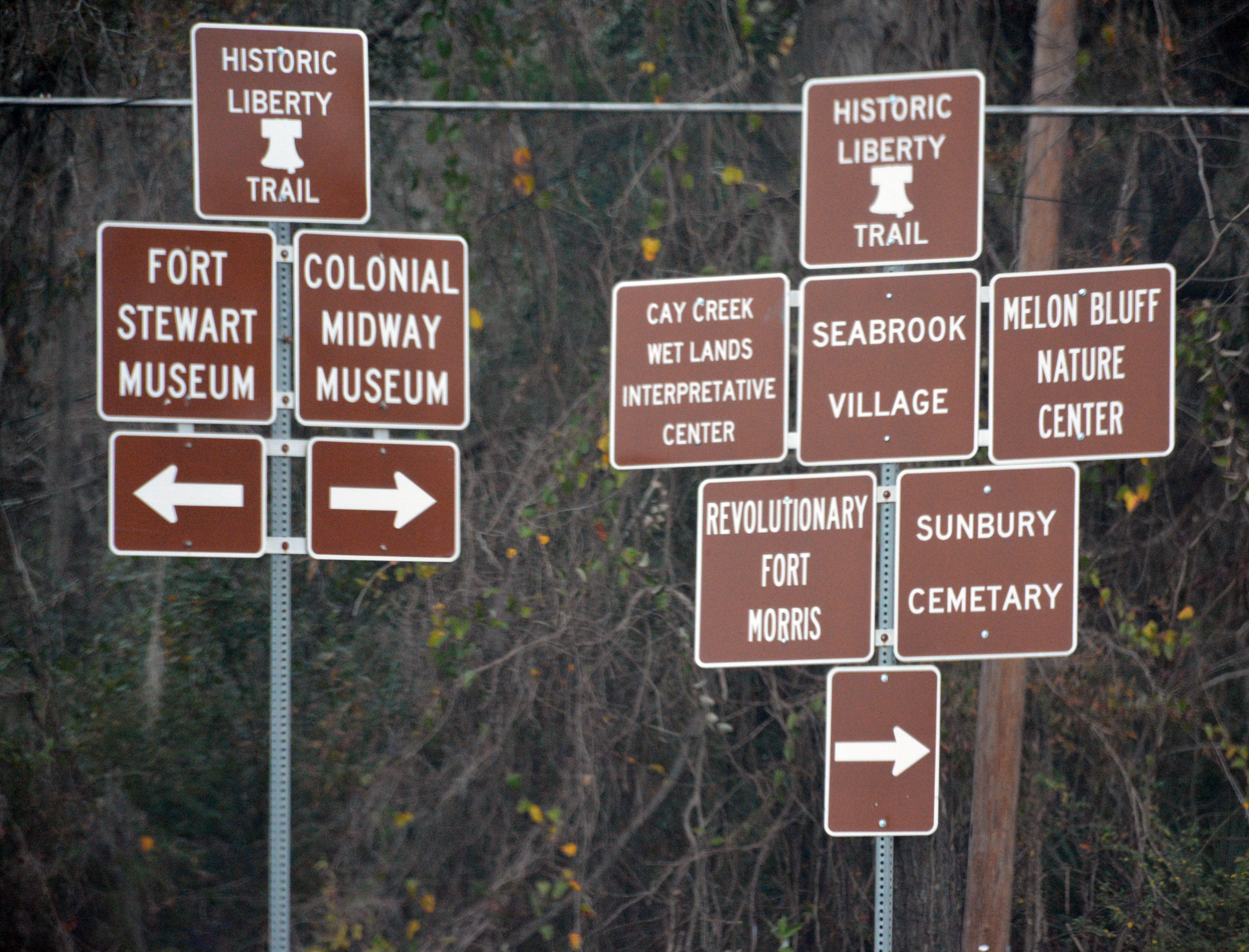
Liberty County has a "Liberty Trail" of its historic sites.

This is a list of the National Register of Historic Places listings in Liberty County, Georgia.

It is intended to be a complete list of the properties on the National Register of Historic Places in Liberty County, Georgia, United States. The locations of National Register properties for which the latitude and longitude coordinates are included below, may be seen in a Google map.

There are 12 properties listed on the National Register in the county.

This National Park Service list is complete through NPS recent listings posted May 23, 2025.

== Current listings ==
	Name on the Register	Image	Date listed	Location	City or town	Description
1	Bacon-Fraser House	Bacon-Fraser House	April 18, 1985 (#85000848)	208 E. Court St. 31°50′53″N 81°35′37″W	Hinesville	
2	Eddie Bowens Farm	Eddie Bowens Farm	October 25, 2004 (#04001209)	660 Trade Hill Rd. 31°44′38″N 81°19′10″W	Seabrook	
3	Cassels' Store	Cassels' Store	August 5, 1983 (#83000232)	Off U.S. Route 84; 31°49′36″N 81°31′44″W	McIntosh	Parts of the opposite wall are still standing
4	Dorchester Academy Boys' Dormitory	Dorchester Academy Boys' Dormitory	June 23, 1986 (#86001371)	8787 East Oglethorpe Highway (U.S. Route 84); 31°48′02″N 81°27′56″W	Midway	National Historic Landmark
5	Flemington Presbyterian Church	Flemington Presbyterian Church	June 17, 1982 (#82002449)	Off Old Sunbury Rd. 31°52′11″N 81°34′15″W	Flemington	
6	Fort Morris	Fort Morris	May 13, 1970 (#70000208)	2559 Fort Morris Road; 31°45′42″N 81°16′52″W	Midway	Fort Morris State Historic Site is a state park open to the public
7	Liberty County Courthouse	Liberty County Courthouse	September 18, 1980 (#80001105)	Courthouse Sq. 31°50′52″N 81°35′45″W	Hinesville	
8	Liberty County Jail	Liberty County Jail	August 18, 1992 (#92001036)	302 S. Main St. 31°50′44″N 81°35′47″W	Hinesville	Historic brick jail built in 1892.
9	Midway Historic District	Midway Historic District	March 1, 1973 (#73000625)	Junction of U.S. Route 17 and Martin Road; 31°48′22″N 81°25′51″W	Midway	
10	Sam Ripley Farm	Sam Ripley Farm	October 27, 2004 (#04001187)	1337 Dorchester Village Rd. 31°45′39″N 81°22′12″W	Midway	Farm established in 1926
11	St. Catherines Island	St. Catherines Island	December 16, 1969 (#69000332)	One of the barrier islands of Georgia, south of Savannah. 31°37′56″N 81°09′48″W	South Newport	National Historic Landmark
12	Woodmanston Site	Woodmanston Site	June 18, 1973 (#73000626)	Southwest of Riceboro off Barrington Rd. 31°41′52″N 81°28′23″W	Riceboro	The site is gated, but you can visit the site by appointment.
