= Yount's Woolen Mill and Boarding House =

- U.S. National Register of Historic Places
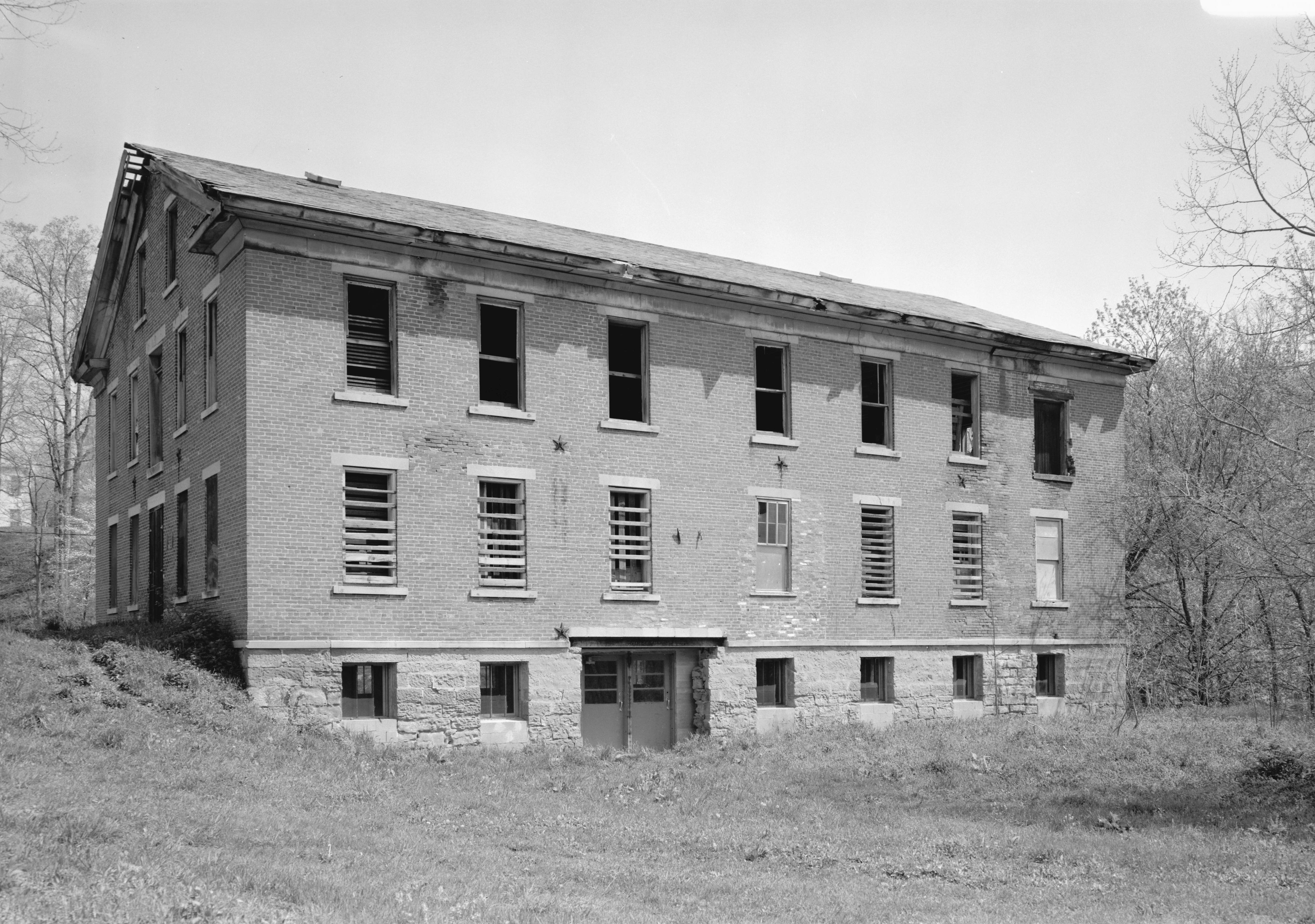
- Yount's Woolen Mill, HABS Photo, April 1974

- Location within Indiana Location within the United States
- Location: 3729 Old SR 32 West, west of Crawfordsville in Ripley Township, Montgomery County, Indiana
- Coordinates: 40°1′21″N 86°59′3″W
- Area: 10 acres (4.0 ha)
- Built: 1851, 1864
- Architectural style: Greek Revival, Federal
- NRHP reference No.: 88003041
- Added to NRHP: January 4, 1989

Yount's Woolen Mill and Boarding House is a historic woolen mill and boarding house located in Ripley Township, Montgomery County, Indiana. The boarding house was built in 1851, and is a two-story, L-shaped, Late Federal style brick building. It has a gable-on-hip roof and two-story porch on the rear side. The mill was built in 1864, and is a 2 1/2-story brick building on a raised basement with Greek Revival style design elements. Also on the property are the remains of an 1849 frame mill, an 1867 brick building, dam and mill race. The Yount Mill was contracted by the U.S. Government to manufacture Army uniforms during both the American Civil War and Spanish–American War.

It was listed on the National Register of Historic Places in 1989.
