= Fort Ripley =

Fort Ripley may refer to:

- Fort Ripley (South Carolina), Charleston, South Carolina, now the site of the Fort Ripley Shoal Light
- Fort Ripley (Minnesota fort), located within Camp Ripley, Minnesota
- Fort Ripley, Minnesota, a township

== See also ==
- Ripley (disambiguation)
