= Abijah O'Neall II House =

Historic house in Indiana, United States

- Abijah II O'Neall House
- U.S. National Register of Historic Places
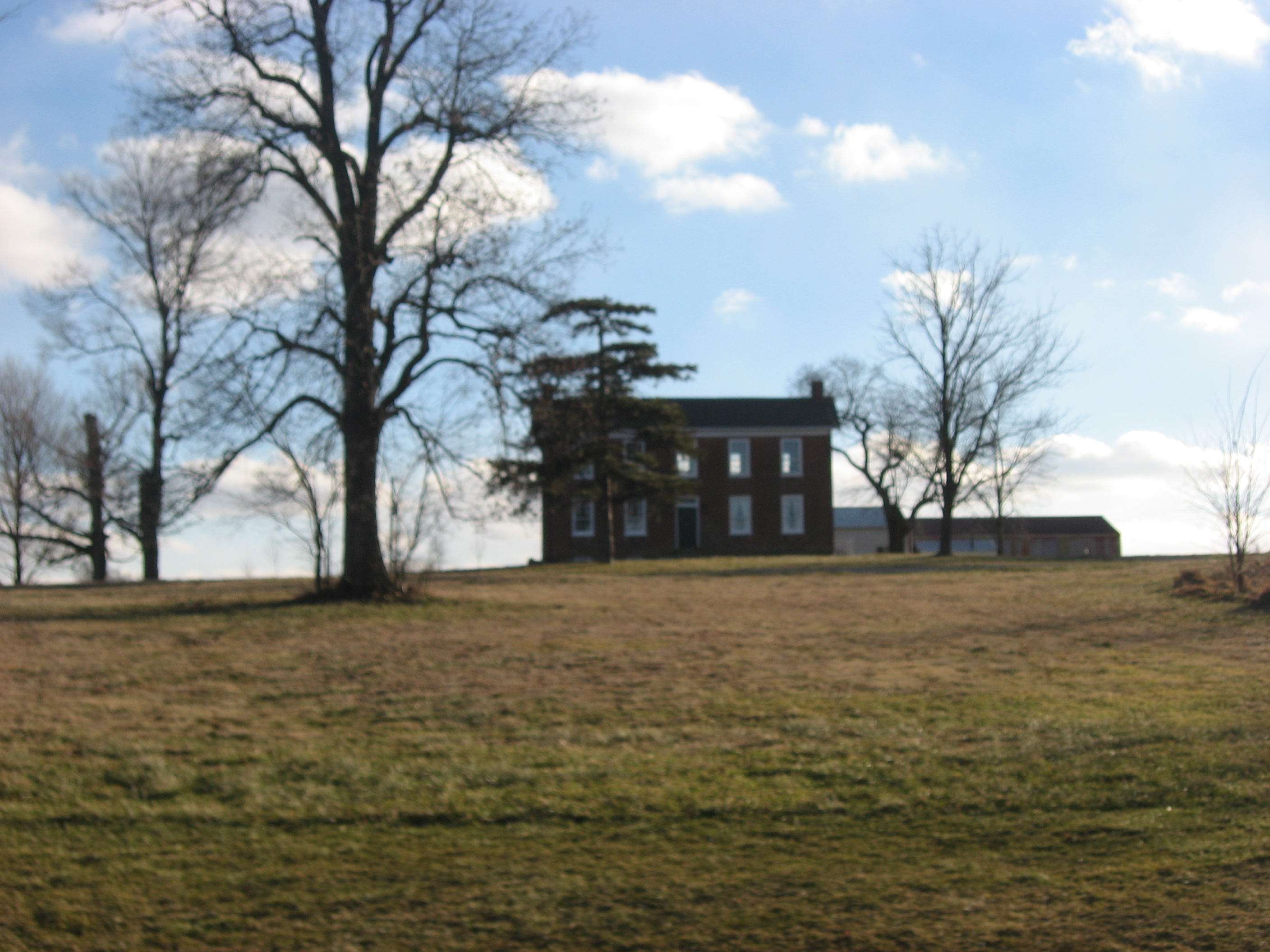
- Abijah O'Neall II House, January 2013

- Location within Indiana Location within the United States
- Location: 4040 W. 300S, west of Crawfordsville in Ripley Township, Montgomery County, Indiana
- Coordinates: 40°1′28″N 86°59′3″W
- Area: 3.4 acres (1.4 ha)
- Built: 1848, 1910
- Architectural style: Federal, I-House
- NRHP reference No.: 05001016
- Added to NRHP: September 15, 2005

Abijah II O'Neall House is a historic home located in Ripley Township, Montgomery County, Indiana. It was built in 1848, and is a two-story, five-bay, Federal style brick I-house with a brick ell. A wood-frame addition was built in 1910.

It was listed on the National Register of Historic Places in 2005.
