= Deer's Mill, Indiana =

- Unincorporated community
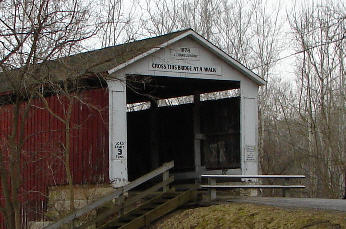
- Deer's Mill Covered Bridge

- Location in Montgomery County
- Coordinates: 39°56′51″N 87°03′20″W
- Country: United States
- State: Indiana
- County: Montgomery
- Township: Ripley
- Elevation: 594 ft (181 m)
- Time zone: UTC-5 (Eastern (EST))
  - Summer (DST): UTC-4 (EDT)
- ZIP code: 47933
- Area code: 765
- FIPS code: 18-17336
- GNIS feature ID: 433435

Deer's Mill or Deer Mill is an unincorporated community in Ripley Township, Montgomery County, in the U.S. state of Indiana.

== History ==
Deer's Mill was built by Joel Deer in 1829.

A year after arriving in Montgomery County, in 1829, Joel built the township's first grist and saw mill along the banks of Sugar Creek. It was called Deer's Mill, and that small corner of Montgomery County retains that name to this day. The original millhouse was of log construction with common stones, and primarily ground wheat and corn.

In 1833, Joel platted a small village adjacent to the mill. It was at various times known as Deer's Mill, Deerfield, Deerford, and Bluff Mill. The community, however, never quite developed, and any remnants have long since vanished. Deer's Mill, however, did a thriving business, and in 1839, Joel replaced the original log structure with one made of frame construction. Over time, a woolen mill and general store were added to the Deer's Mill enterprise.

== Bridge ==
The Deer's Mill bridge was built in 1878 by J. J. Daniels and spans 275 feet (84 m) across Sugar Creek. It was documented by the Historic American Engineering Record in 1974.

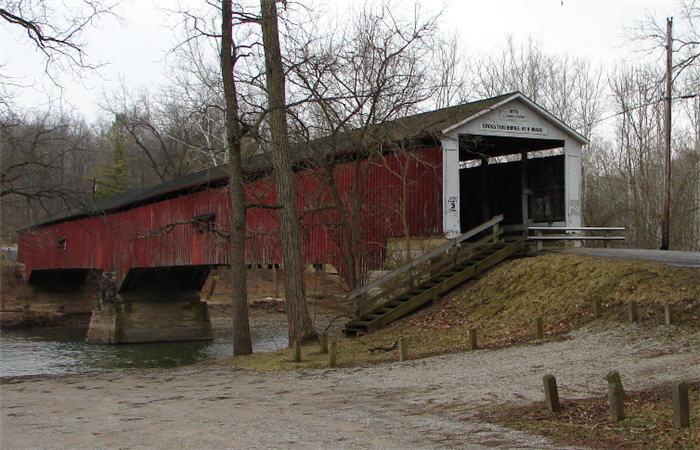
Deer's Mill Covered Bridge
