= Cassels' Store =

- U.S. National Register of Historic Places
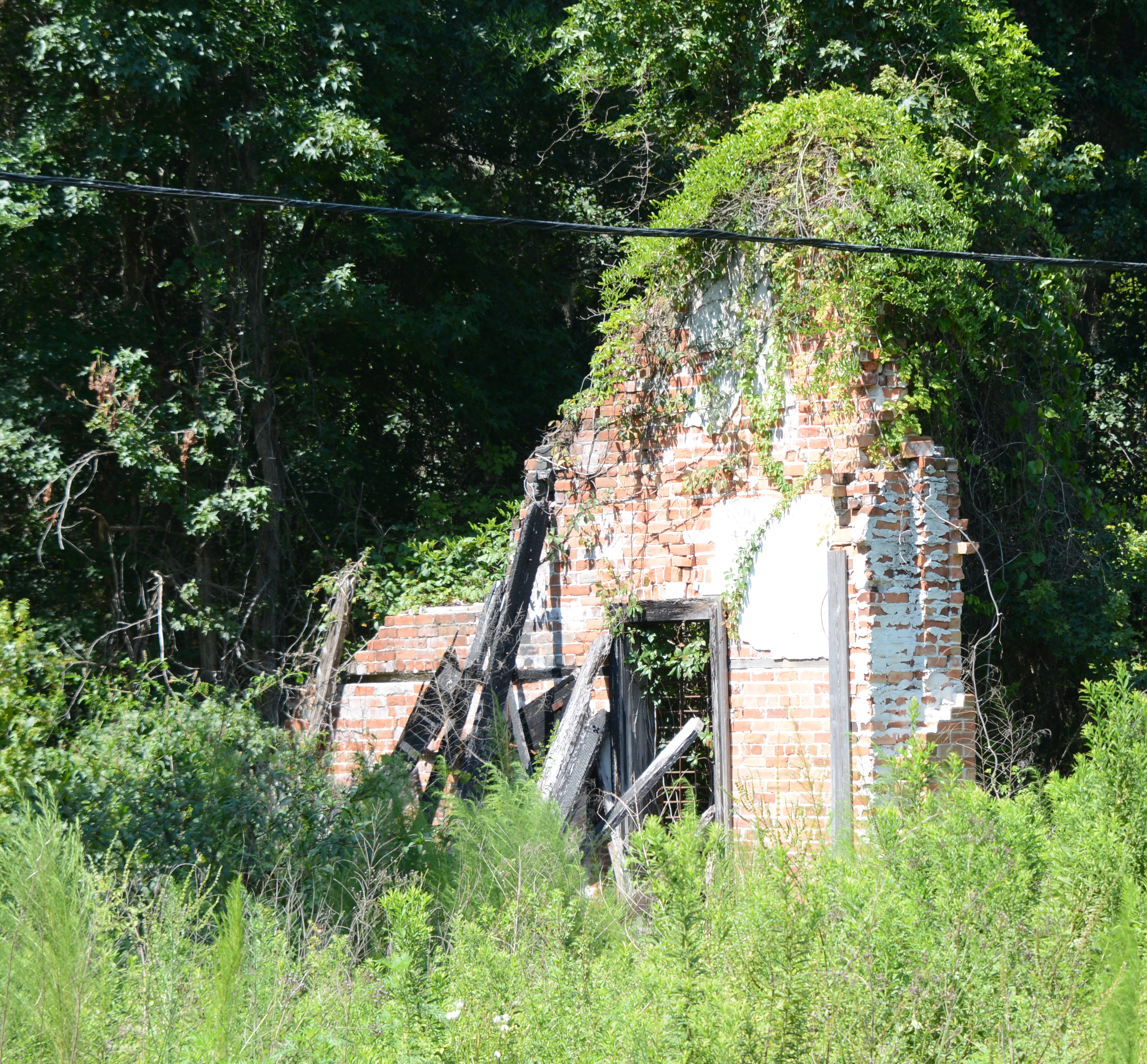
- Remains of Cassels' Store (2015)

- Location within Georgia Location within the United States
- Location: Off U.S. Route 84; McIntosh, Georgia
- Coordinates: 31°49′36″N 81°31′44″W
- Built: 1887
- NRHP reference No.: 83000232
- Added to NRHP: August 5, 1983

Cassels' Store is a historic structure in McIntosh, Georgia. The structure consists of the remains of a store built in 1887. In 1983, the site was added to the National Register of Historic Places.

== History ==
The store was built by Robert Quarterman Cassels (Note: Given as "Cassel" in some sources.) in 1887 on the site of a previous store in McIntosh, Georgia. The general store, located across from McIntosh's railroad depot, stood three stories tall and had an elevator. The store was officially known as R. Q. Cassels and Sons Store and was operated by Robert and his two sons. Following Robert's death in 1900, his two sons continued to operate the store until 1928. Upon its closing, the building fell into ruin, and today only some of the original structure remains. On August 5, 1983, the structure was added to the National Register of Historic Places.

== See also ==
- National Register of Historic Places listings in Liberty County, Georgia

== Bibliography ==
- Caldwell, Wilber W. (2001). The Courthouse and the Depot: The Architecture of Hope in an Age of Despair : a Narrative Guide to Railroad Expansion and Its Impact on Public Architecture in Georgia, 1833-1910. Mercer University Press. pp. 199–200. ISBN 978-0-86554-748-3 – via Google Books.
- "Cassels Store (1887-1928)". Liberty County Historical Society. Archived from the original on January 7, 2022.
- National Register of Historic Places, 1966 to 1994: Cumulative List Through January 1, 1994. National Park Service. 1994. p. 156. ISBN 978-0-89133-254-1 – via Google Books.
