= Sam Ripley Farm =

- U.S. National Register of Historic Places
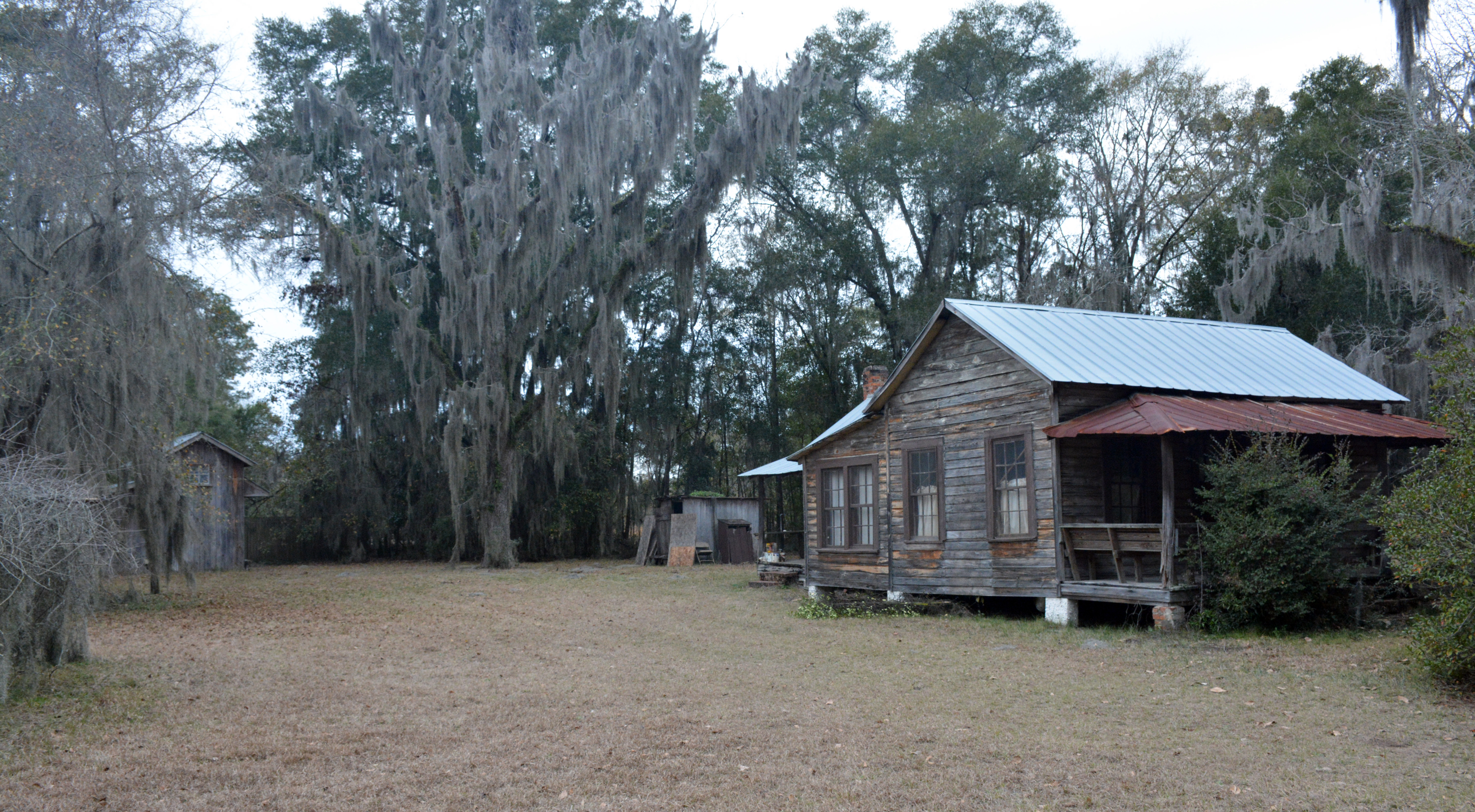
- Sam Ripley Farm in 2015

- Location within Georgia
- Location: 1337 Dorchester Village Road; Midway, Georgia
- Coordinates: 31°45′39″N 81°22′12″W
- Area: 2.5 acres (1.0 ha)
- Built: 1926
- Architectural style: Vernacular Hall-parlor plan
- NRHP reference No.: 04001187
- Added to NRHP: October 27, 2004

Sam Ripley Farm is a historic farm near Midway, Georgia in rural Liberty County, Georgia. The structure was built in 1926 and added to the National Register of Historic Places in 2004.

== History ==
The farm was built in 1926 by Sam Ripley on a portion of his father Harry Ripley's land. The building is typical of subsistence farms of the era. Ripley died in 1988 and the property was sold in 1994. Following some rehabilitation, the property was operated as a bed and breakfast. It was added to the National Register of Historic Places on October 27, 2004.

According to documentation by the NRHP, the building is "representative of the type of African-American subsistence farmsteads developed after the Civil War." The structure is an example of vernacular architecture.

== See also ==
- National Register of Historic Places listings in Liberty County, Georgia
