= Alamo, Indiana =

- Town
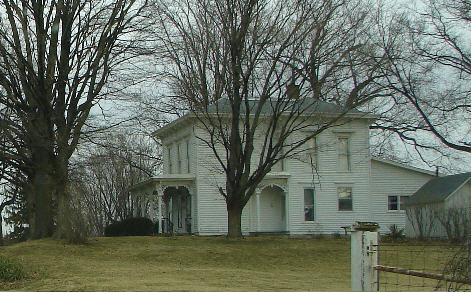

- Location in Montgomery County
- Coordinates: 39°59′00″N 87°03′19″W
- Country: United States
- State: Indiana
- County: Montgomery
- Township: Ripley
- Established: 1837

Area
  - Total: 0.062 sq mi (0.16 km^{2})
  - Land: 0.062 sq mi (0.16 km^{2})
  - Water: 0 sq mi (0.00 km^{2})
- Elevation: 814 ft (248 m)

Population (2020)
  - Total: 66
  - Density: 1,060.0/sq mi (409.27/km^{2})
- Time zone: UTC−5 (Eastern (EST))
  - Summer (DST): UTC−5 (EST)
- ZIP code: 47916
- Area code: 765
- FIPS code: 18-00784
- GNIS ID: 2397421

Alamo is a town in Ripley Township, Montgomery County, in the U.S. state of Indiana. The population was 66 at the 2020 census, unchanged from 2010.

== History ==
Alamo was laid out and platted in 1837. It became a small trading center for nearby farms. In 1859 a road connected Alamo to Crawfordsville, and the Yountsville Covered Bridge was built. The town was named for the Alamo Mission in San Antonio, Texas.

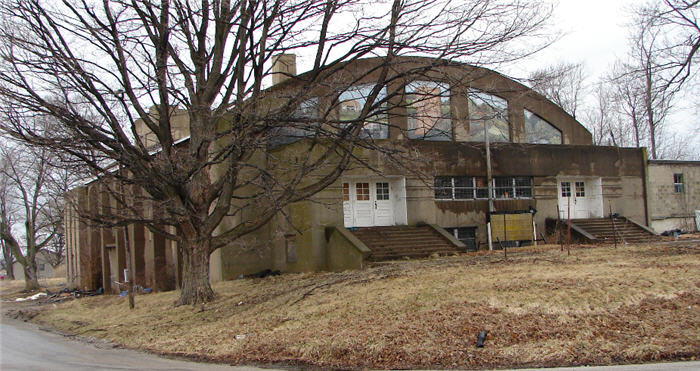
Gym in Alamo

The post office at Alamo has been in operation since 1844.

== Geography ==
Alamo is located in western Montgomery County 13 miles (21 km) southwest of Crawfordsville, the county seat.

According to the U.S. Census Bureau, Alamo has a total area of 0.06 square miles (0.16 km^{2}), all land. It sits on high ground which drains east to tributaries of Sugar Creek and west to tributaries of Stillwater Creek, which joins Sugar Mill Creek at Wallace and is part of the Sugar Creek watershed, flowing west to the Wabash River north of Montezuma.

== Demographics ==
Historical population
Census	Pop.	Note	%±
1880	220		—
1890	272		23.6%
1900	241		−11.4%
1910	209		−13.3%
1920	167		−20.1%
1930	163		−2.4%
1940	155		−4.9%
1950	163		5.2%
1960	144		−11.7%
1970	145		0.7%
1980	178		22.8%
1990	112		−37.1%
2000	137		22.3%
2010	66		−51.8%
2020	66		0.0%
U.S. Decennial Census

=== 2010 census ===
As of the 2010 census, there were 66 people, 26 households, and 17 families living in the town. The population density was 942.9 inhabitants per square mile (364.1/km^{2}). There were 39 housing units at an average density of 557.1 per square mile (215.1/km^{2}). The racial makeup of the town was 89.4% White, 3.0% Native American, 6.1% from other races, and 1.5% from two or more races. Hispanic or Latino of any race were 6.1% of the population.

There were 26 households, of which 30.8% had children under the age of 18 living with them, 42.3% were married couples living together, 15.4% had a female householder with no husband present, 7.7% had a male householder with no wife present, and 34.6% were non-families. 26.9% of all households were made up of individuals, and 19.2% had someone living alone who was 65 years of age or older. The average household size was 2.54 and the average family size was 3.00.

The median age in the town was 36.7 years. 24.2% of residents were under the age of 18; 13.6% were between the ages of 18 and 24; 30.3% were from 25 to 44; 21.1% were from 45 to 64; and 10.6% were 65 years of age or older. The gender makeup of the town was 45.5% male and 54.5% female.

=== 2000 census ===
As of the 2000 census, there were 137 people, 46 households, and 32 families living in the town. The population density was 2,388.6 inhabitants per square mile (922.2/km^{2}). There were 53 housing units at an average density of 924.0 per square mile (356.8/km^{2}). The racial makeup of the town was 89.05% White, 1.46% African American, 0.73% Native American, 1.46% from other races, and 7.30% from two or more races. Hispanic or Latino of any race were 1.46% of the population.

There were 46 households, out of which 45.7% had children under the age of 18 living with them, 47.8% were married couples living together, 17.4% had a female householder with no husband present, and 28.3% were non-families. 28.3% of all households were made up of individuals, and 13.0% had someone living alone who was 65 years of age or older. The average household size was 2.98 and the average family size was 3.64.

In the town, the population was spread out, with 38.0% under the age of 18, 5.8% from 18 to 24, 28.5% from 25 to 44, 16.8% from 45 to 64, and 10.9% who were 65 years of age or older. The median age was 28 years. For every 100 females, there were 95.7 males. For every 100 females age 18 and over, there were 97.7 males.

The median income for a household in the town was $17,500, and the median income for a family was $19,583. Males had a median income of $32,813 versus $23,750 for females. The per capita income for the town was $8,800. There were 30.3% of families and 29.6% of the population living below the poverty line, including 42.6% of under eighteens and none of those over 64.

== Education ==
South Montgomery Community School Corporation operates public schools serving Alamo. Southmont Junior High School and Southmont High School serve secondary students.

== Organizations ==
There are three main not-for-profit organizations in Alamo:

- The Alamo Christian Church, Kevin Howey, Minister
- Ripley Township Fire Department
- Masonic Lodge No. 144
