= Shades State Park =

State park in Indiana, United States

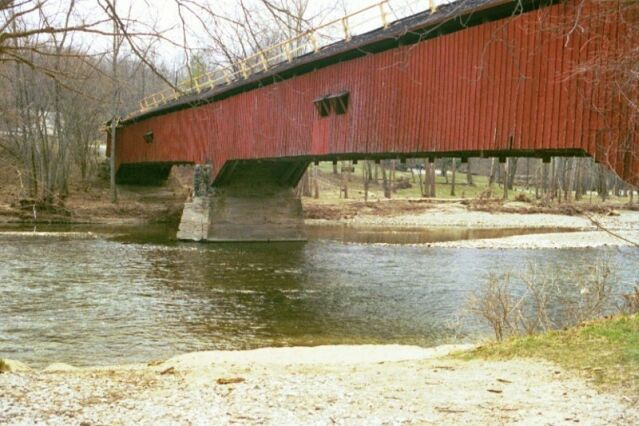
- Deer Mill Covered Bridge

- Location within Indiana
- Type: State park
- Location: Parke County, Montgomery County, and Fountain County, Indiana, United States
- Nearest city: Alamo, Indiana
- Coordinates: 39°56′30″N 87°05′30″W
- Area: 3,082 acres (1,247 ha)
- Created: 1947
- Operator: Indiana Department of Natural Resources
- Visitors: 125,313 (in 2024–2025)
- Website: Official website

Shades State Park is a state park in Montgomery, Parke, and Fountain counties in Indiana, United States. It is located 47 miles (76 km) west-northwest of Indianapolis. In 2024–2025, Shades received an estimated 125,000 visitors.

== History ==
In the last decades of the 19th century, the area was a resort with a forty-room inn. In the 1930s, Joseph Frisz acquired the land in order to protect it. His heirs sold the land in 1947 to the holding company Save the Shades, which in turn gave it to the state to create Indiana's 15th state park.

Originally, the area was known as the "Shades of Death". The original of the name is uncertain. Some say it was due to the way the trees cast their shadow on the ground below, making it look like a black forest. Others say it was because of a settler's death, although details are unclear and contradictory.

== Features ==
Steep sandstone cliffs within the park were formed when Indiana was covered by ocean hundreds of millions of years ago. Fossils can be found on the nearby sandbars.

Sugar Creek, which runs through the park, is too unsafe for swimming, but canoeing is available. Sugar Creek also runs through Turkey Run State Park, which is about 5 miles (8.0 km) to the southwest. The two parks share similar features including steep ravines, slate and sandstone valleys, and small waterfalls.

The Silver Cascade waterfall is small, but unique, in that it is a convex waterfall. An excellent view of it and nearby Sugar Creek can be had from Lover's Leap, a small observation deck built out over the cliff.

Indiana State Road 234 crosses the property, designating the boundary between the state park and Pine Hills Nature Preserve.

Shades is also notable for previously having a small airfield called Roscoe Turner Flight Strip (FAA: 8I2), where visitors once could land their plane and then visit the park. It was 3,000 feet (910 m) long and 120 feet (37 m) wide. The airfield was shut down sometime between 1998 and 2003. In 2010, Shades Airport Road was built over the old runway.

Map of the local area

== Pine Hills Nature Preserve ==
Pine Hills Natural Area
- Interactive map of Pine Hills Natural Area

U.S. National Natural Landmark
- Designated: 1968

Located in the eastern end of the state park, the 470-acre (190 ha) Pine Hills Nature Preserve protects the deep canyons formed by Indian Creek before it enters Sugar Creek. The primary feature in the preserve is the "Devil's Backbone," a 100-foot-high stone ridge barely wide enough for the trail to cross. The preserve was the first dedicated nature preserve in Indiana, and was designated a National Natural Landmark in 1968 under the name "Pine Hills Natural Area."

== Gallery ==
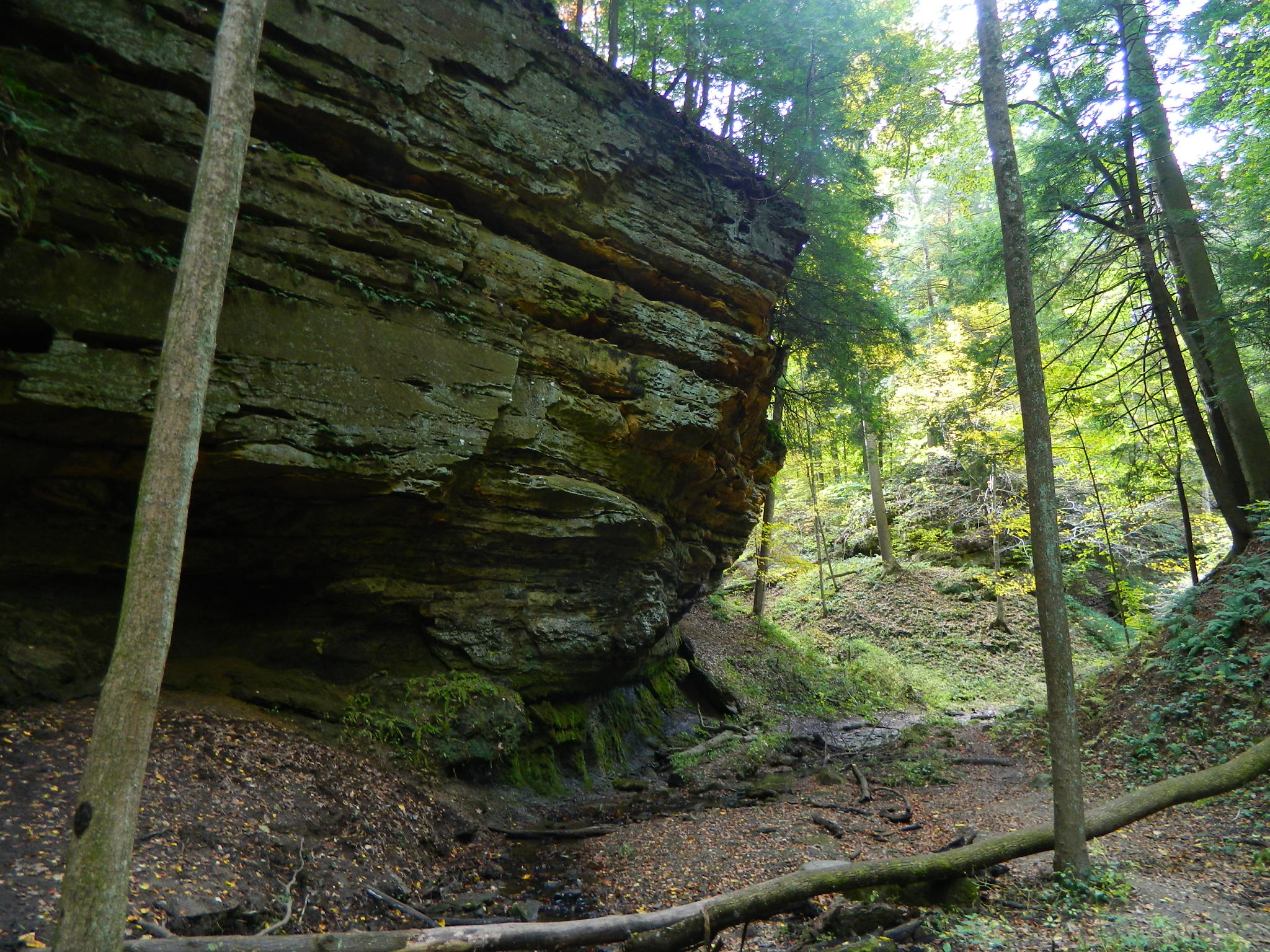
Siltstone rock formations in Shades State Park

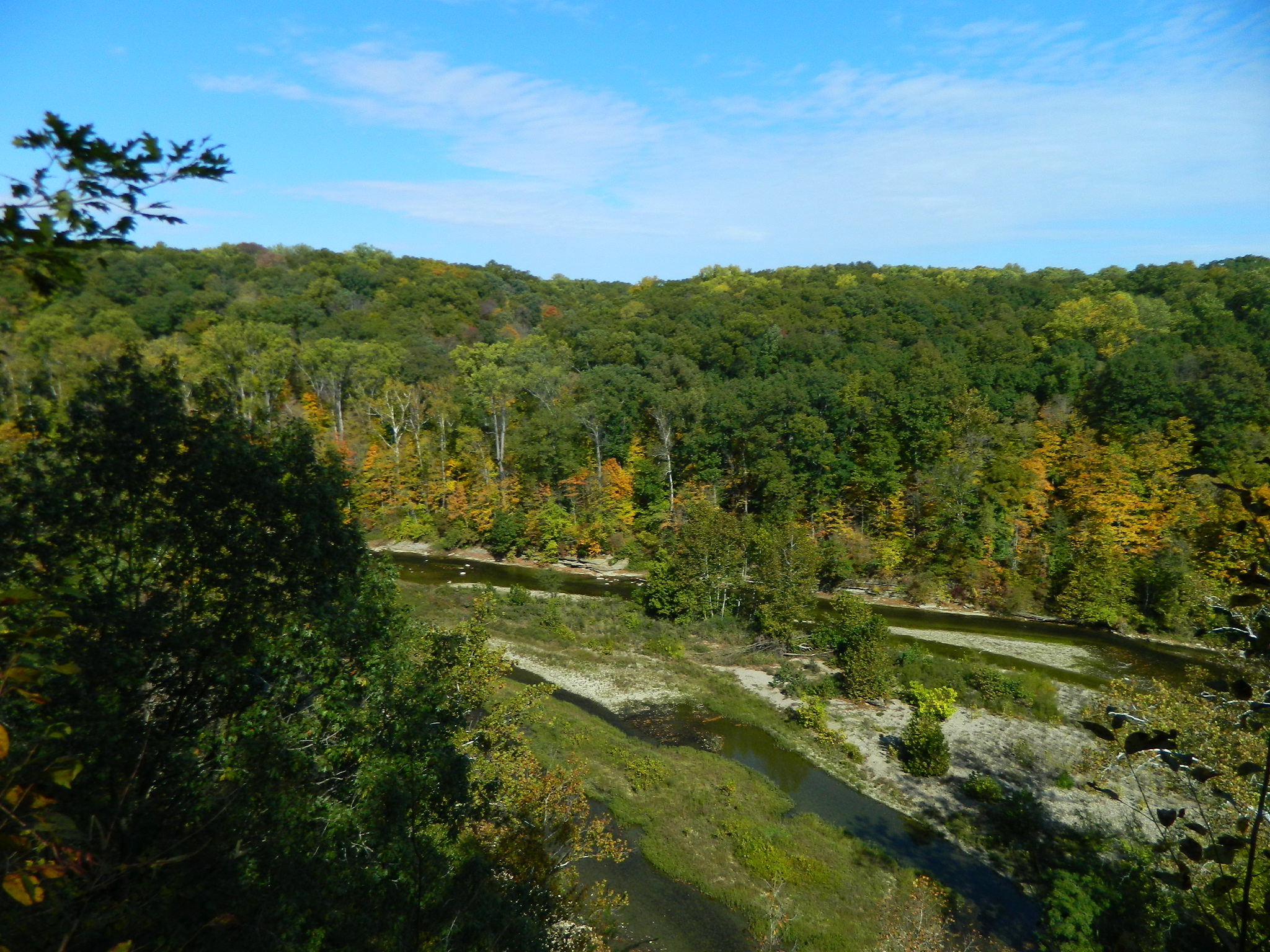
Canoe Island in Sugar Creek, as seen from Inspiration Point in Shades State Park

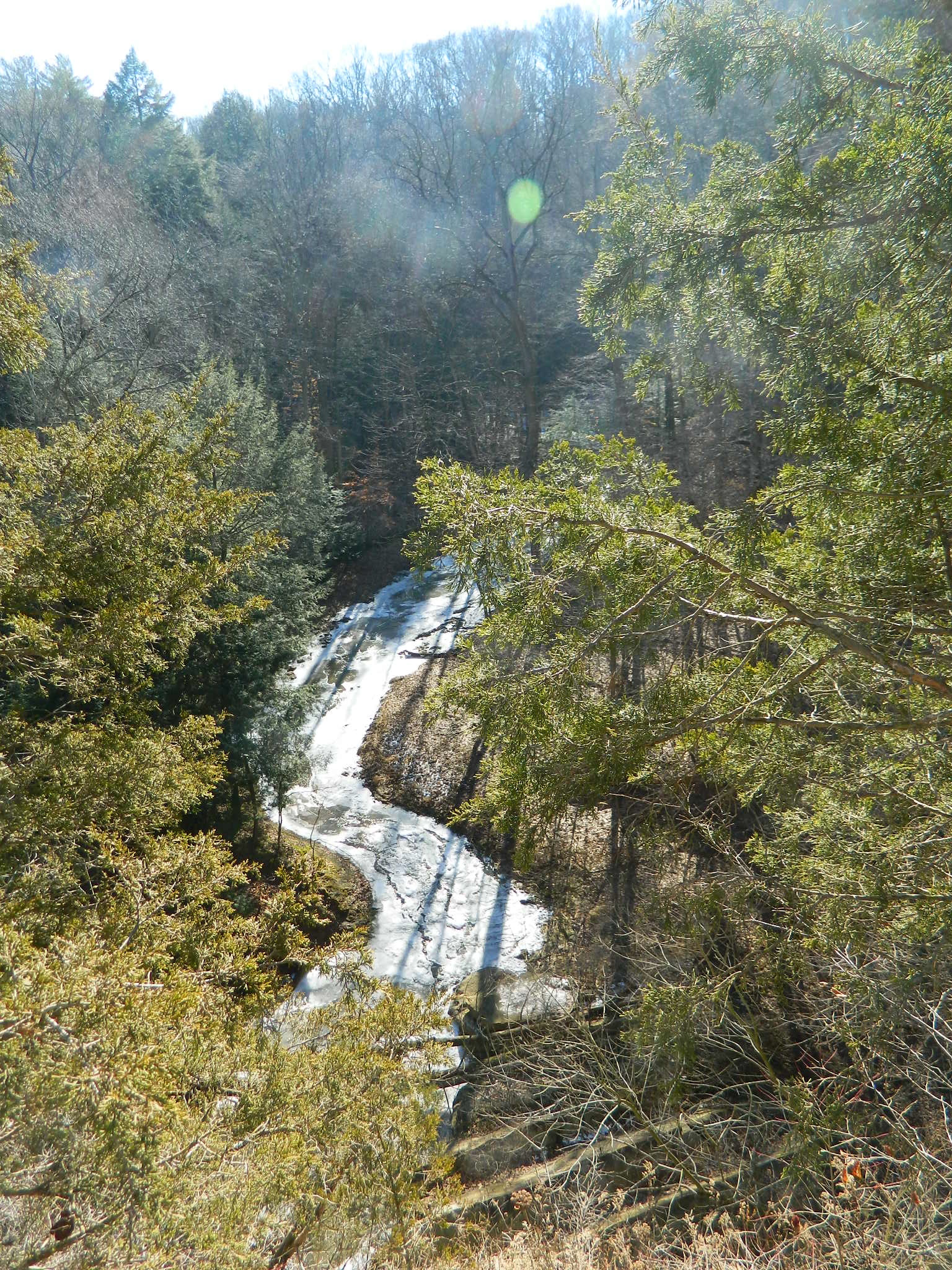
Indian Creek during winter, as seen from Devil's Backbone in Pine Hills Nature Preserve

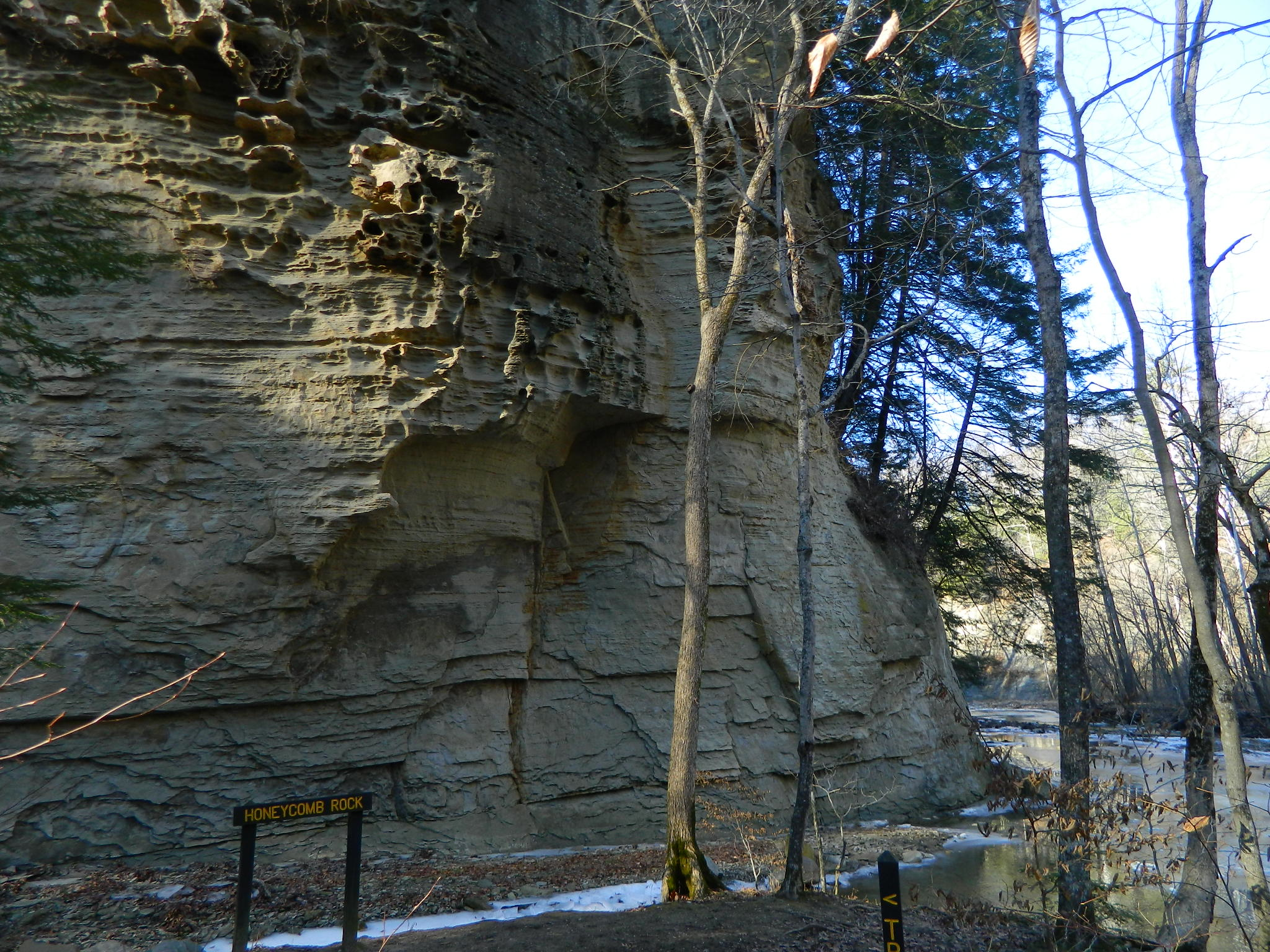
Honeycomb Rock, a rock formation in Pine Hills Nature Preserve

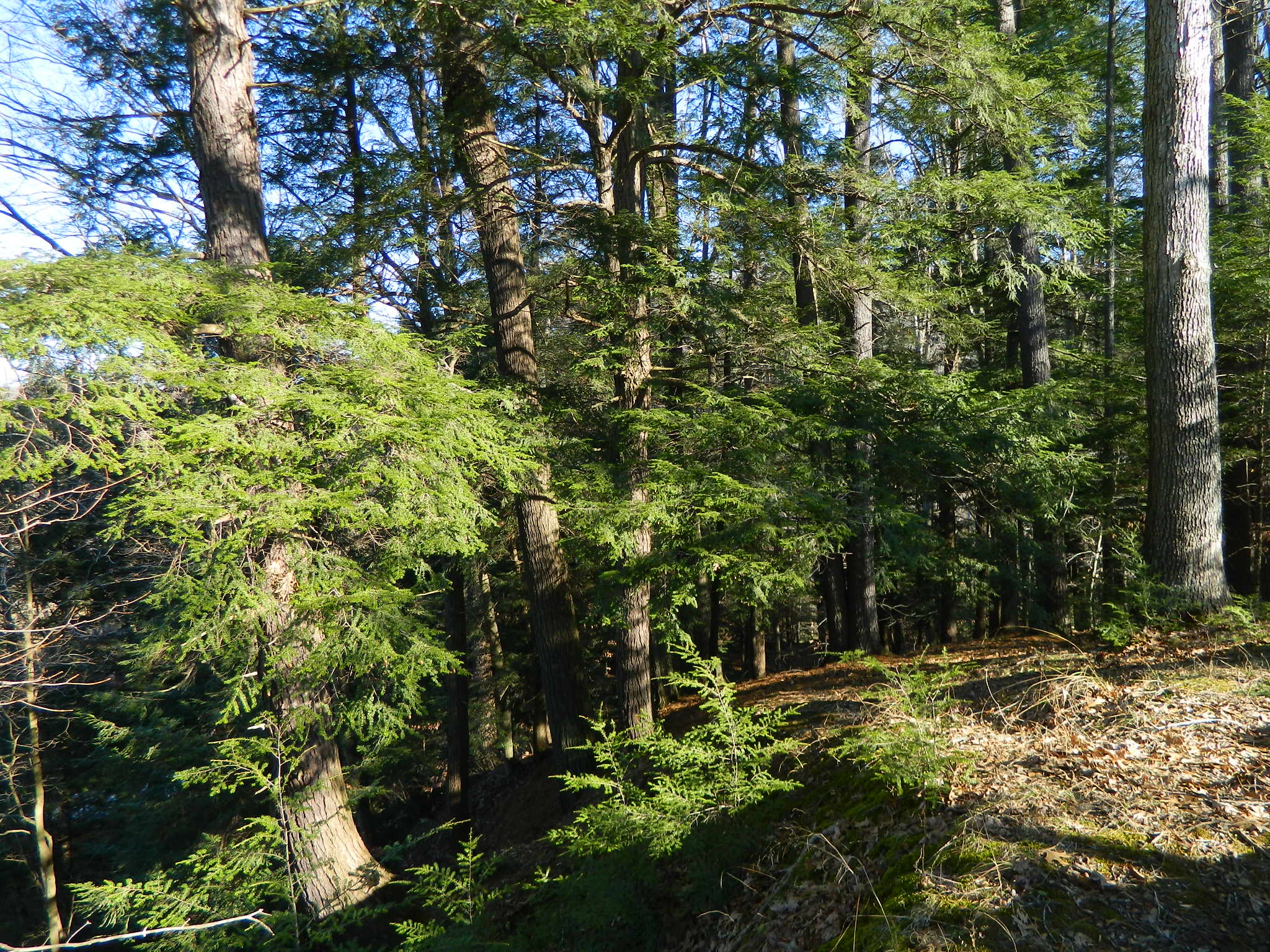
Pine Hills Nature Preserve
