= Fleming, Georgia =

- Unincorporated community
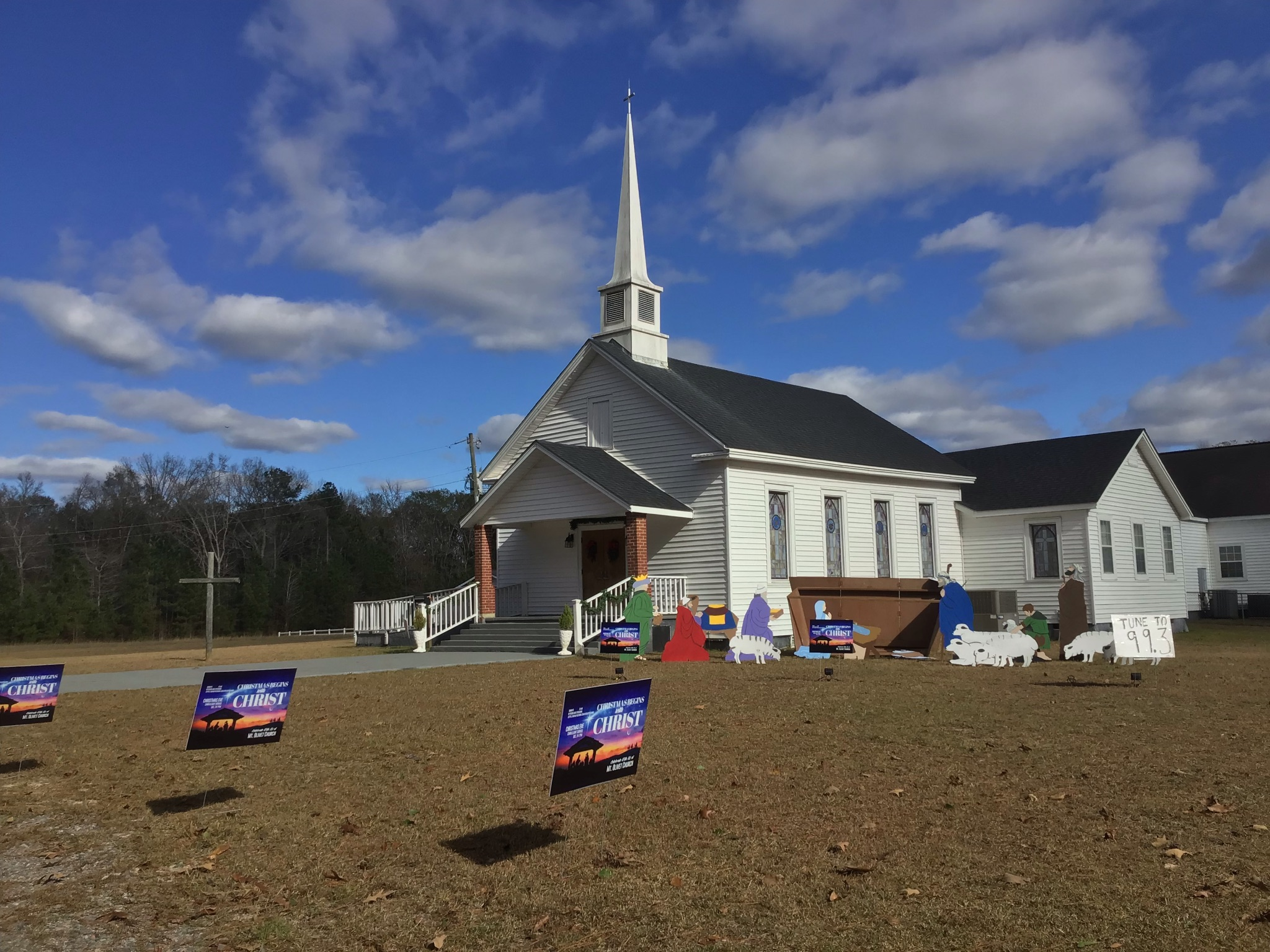
- Mount Olivet United Methodist Church in Fleming

- Location within Georgia Location within the United States
- Coordinates: 31°52′51″N 81°25′35″W
- Country: United States
- State: Georgia
- County: Liberty
- Elevation: 20 ft (6.1 m)
- Time zone: UTC-5 (Eastern (EST))
  - Summer (DST): UTC-4 (EDT)
- ZIP code: 31309
- Area code: 912
- GNIS feature ID: 326291

Fleming is an unincorporated community in Liberty County, Georgia, United States. The community is 10.2 miles (16.4 km) east-northeast of Hinesville. A post office at Fleming was established in 1869 and remained in operation until March 9, 2013; it still has its ZIP code, 31309. As of the United States Census 2020, the population of the 31309 ZIP Code Tabulation Area was 951.

== History ==
Fleming was established after the Civil War as a railroad depot. It was convenient for officials of the nearby freedmen's bureau, which was a few miles away. The community is named after William Fleming, a resident who owned a plantation adjacent to the original townsite.

By 1886, it was a center for farming and naval stores. Along with a railroad depot and a post office, it also had a general store and a wheelwright.

Mount Olivet Methodist Church was established in Fleming in 1843 by John Stacy and Hannah McCall Adams. Another church, the Macedonia Missionary Baptist Church, was established in 1913. Within 5 years, the name of the church was changed to the Fleming Baptist Church.

Fleming's population was 130 residents in 1887. The population had grown to 212 by 1925. In 1953, Fleming had a population of 400, with only one telephone.

There was a soil and water field station, the Tidewater Experiment Station, (or the Southern Tidewater Experiment Station) in Fleming in the 1950s and 1960s.

A passenger train and a freight train collided in Fleming on January 17, 1953. Two people died and 85 others were injured. The Interstate Commerce Commission stated that the crash's cause was "excessive speed".

In 2002, local postal worker Sallie Gaglia was murdered in the Fleming Post Office during a robbery of $1,175 in money orders. Local man Meier Jason Brown was arrested and later sentenced to death for the crime. His death sentence was commuted by President Joe Biden in 2024. He is currently imprisoned at ADX Florence.

The Fleming Post Office was robbed in 2010. Services were suspended shortly afterwards due to constant vandalism, low traffic, less than two hours of work being needed per day, and average daily sales being below $50. Postal services were relocated to nearby Richmond Hill, in Bryan County. The Post Office officially ended operations on March 9, 2013; the community it still has its ZIP code, 31309.

== Climate ==
Fleming had the highest recorded monthly rainfall in the state of Georgia at one time, with 28.6 inches of rain falling on the month of August in 1898. During the Hurricane Frances tornado outbreak on September 6, 2004, an F1 tornado was reported northwest of Fleming. The damage was limited to trees. During Hurricane Debby in 2024, Fleming experienced severe flooding that trapped around 100 people in their homes.

== Education ==
The Liberty County School District operates public schools that serve Fleming.
