= Yountsville, Indiana =

- Unincorporated community
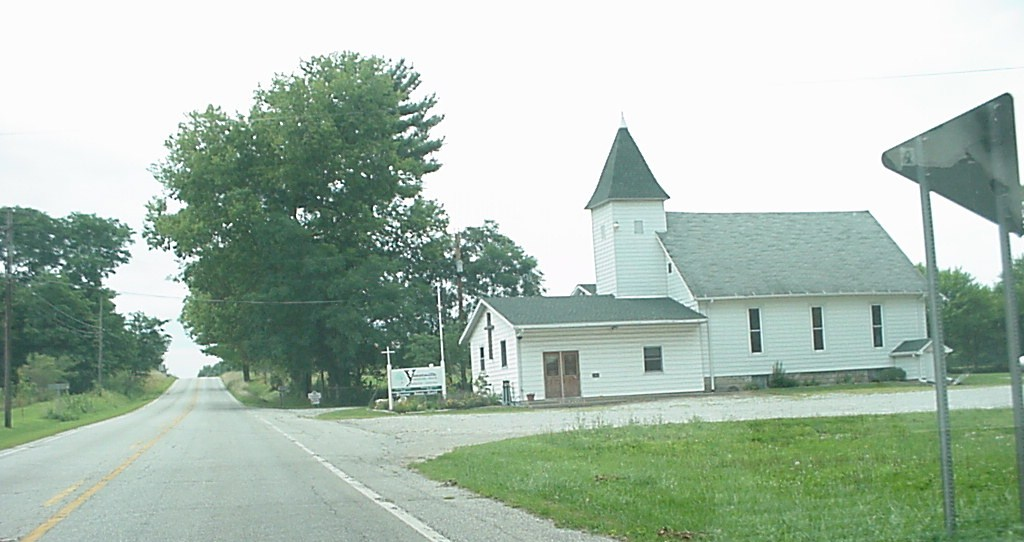
- Yountsville Community Church

- Location in Montgomery County
- Coordinates: 40°01′29″N 86°58′48″W
- Country: United States
- State: Indiana
- County: Montgomery
- Township: Ripley
- Elevation: 728 ft (222 m)
- Time zone: UTC-5 (Eastern (EST))
  - Summer (DST): UTC-4 (EDT)
- ZIP code: 47933
- Area code: 765
- FIPS code: 18-86282
- GNIS feature ID: 446420

Yountsville is an unincorporated community in Ripley Township, Montgomery County, in the U.S. state of Indiana.

== History ==
Yountsville was named after the local Yount family of settlers, including Daniel Yount, who built a series of mills along a small spring-fed tributary of Sugar Creek. The mills and accompanying buildings provided work and supplies for the area in the 19th century. Fleece from sheep was brought to the mill to be cleaned, carded, spun, dyed, woven, and sewn into clothing and blankets. Though there are some stories of Civil War uniforms being made at Yount's Woolen Mill, there is no official documentation supporting this claim. The mill ceased operations in 1905. Yountsville was a small thriving village through the mid-1880s, and with the introduction of the railroad, the importance of the area mills diminished. Today, Yountsville comprises just a few houses and a local church. One of the mill buildings, an 1864 Greek Revival brick mill structure, stands on the bank of Sugar Creek. An 1851 Federal-style boarding house and inn sits 60 feet (18 m) above the mill overlooking Sugar Creek.

The Yountsville Covered Bridge was built in 1848, and traversed Sugar Creek. The covered bridge existed until 1948.

There was also once a post office in Yountsville, and it ran from 1844 to 1919.

The church, shown in the picture at the top of the page, was destroyed by fire on November 13, 2011. The fire, which started during Sunday services, was deemed electrical and quickly raged out of control due to high winds. No member of the congregation was injured.

== Geography ==
Yountsville is located approximately four miles west of Crawfordsville on State Road 32, west of Yountsville bridge.
