= Ripley Township =

Ripley Township may refer to:

== Illinois ==
- Ripley Township, Brown County, Illinois

== Indiana ==
- Ripley Township, Montgomery County, Indiana
- Ripley Township, Rush County, Indiana

== Iowa ==
- Ripley Township, Butler County, Iowa

== Minnesota ==
- Ripley Township, Dodge County, Minnesota
- Ripley Township, Morrison County, Minnesota

== Ohio ==
- Ripley Township, Holmes County, Ohio
- Ripley Township, Huron County, Ohio
