= Ripley Historic District =

Ripley Historic District may refer to:

- Ripley Historic District (Ripley, Mississippi), listed on the National Register of Historic Places (NRHP)
- Ripley Historic District (Ripley, Ohio), listed on the NRHP in Brown County, Ohio
- Ripley Historic District (Ripley, West Virginia), NRHP-listed
