= McIntosh, Georgia =

Unincorporated community in Georgia, U.S.

Coordinates: 31°49′33″N 81°31′25″W

McIntosh is an unincorporated community in Liberty County, in the U.S. state of Georgia.

== History ==
McIntosh had its start when the Atlantic Coast Line Railroad was extended to that point. The community was originally named Golding's Grove. It was named this after William A. Golding, who donated the buildings and land that were used by the local school and church. It was later named McIntosh after a local train station, which in turn was named after the surname of the station's depot agent.

A post office called McIntosh was established in 1857, and remained in operation until 1975. Cassels' Store, the ruins of a former general store now listed on the National Register of Historic Places, is in the community.
