= Ripley, Independence, Missouri =

Neighborhood of Independence, Missouri, US

Coordinates: 39.250°N 94.573°W

Ripley is a neighborhood of Independence, Missouri, United States.

The community was named after a railroad official; an early variant name was Adams Station.
