= Ripley Township, Montgomery County, Indiana =

Ripley Township
- Township
- Location in Montgomery County
- Coordinates: 39°59′44″N 87°02′41″W
- Country: United States
- State: Indiana
- County: Montgomery

Government
  - Type: Indiana township

Area
  - Total: 31.61 sq mi (81.9 km^{2})
  - Land: 31.58 sq mi (81.8 km^{2})
  - Water: 0.03 sq mi (0.078 km^{2}) 0.09%
- Elevation: 781 ft (238 m)

Population (2020)
  - Total: 936
  - Density: 29.6/sq mi (11.4/km^{2})
- Time zone: UTC-5 (Eastern (EST))
  - Summer (DST): UTC-4 (EDT)
- ZIP codes: 47916, 47933, 47990
- Area code: 765
- GNIS feature ID: 453803

Ripley Township is one of eleven townships in Montgomery County, Indiana, United States. As of the 2020 census, its population was 936 (down from 977 at 2010) and it contained 417 housing units.

== History ==
Abijah O'Neall II House and Yount's Woolen Mill and Boarding House are listed on the National Register of Historic Places.

== Geography ==
According to the 2010 census, the township has a total area of 31.61 square miles (81.9 km^{2}), of which 31.58 square miles (81.8 km^{2}) (or 99.91%) is land and 0.03 square miles (0.078 km^{2}) (or 0.09%) is water.

=== Cities, towns, villages ===
- Alamo

=== Unincorporated towns ===
- Deer Mill at 39.947543°N 87.055565°W
- Taylor Corner at 40.025043°N 87.01612°W
- Yountsville at 40.024766°N 86.980008°W

(This list is based on USGS data and may include former settlements.)

=== Cemeteries ===
The township contains these five cemeteries: Fruits, O'Neal, Sparks, Stonebraker and Yountsville.

=== Landmarks ===
- Shades State Park (north quarter)

== School districts ==
- South Montgomery Community School Corporation

== Political districts ==
- Indiana's 4th congressional district
- State House District 41
- State Senate District 23
