= Seabrook, Georgia =

Unincorporated community in Georgia, U.S.

Coordinates: 31°44′37″N 81°19′43″W

Seabrook is an unincorporated community in Liberty County, in the U.S. state of Georgia.

== History ==
Seabrook was originally built up chiefly by former slaves, and named for a nearby brook which empties into the sea. A post office called Seabrook was established in 1895, and remained in operation until 1917.
