= Ripley High School =

Ripley High School may refer to:

- Ripley High School (Mississippi), Ripley, Mississippi
- Ripley High School (Oklahoma), Ripley, Oklahoma
- Ripley High School (Tennessee), Ripley, Tennessee
- Ripley High School (West Virginia), Ripley, West Virginia
- Ripley-Union-Lewis-Huntington High School, Ripley, Ohio
- South Ripley High School, Versailles, Indiana
