= Liberty County, Georgia =

County in Georgia, United States

- County
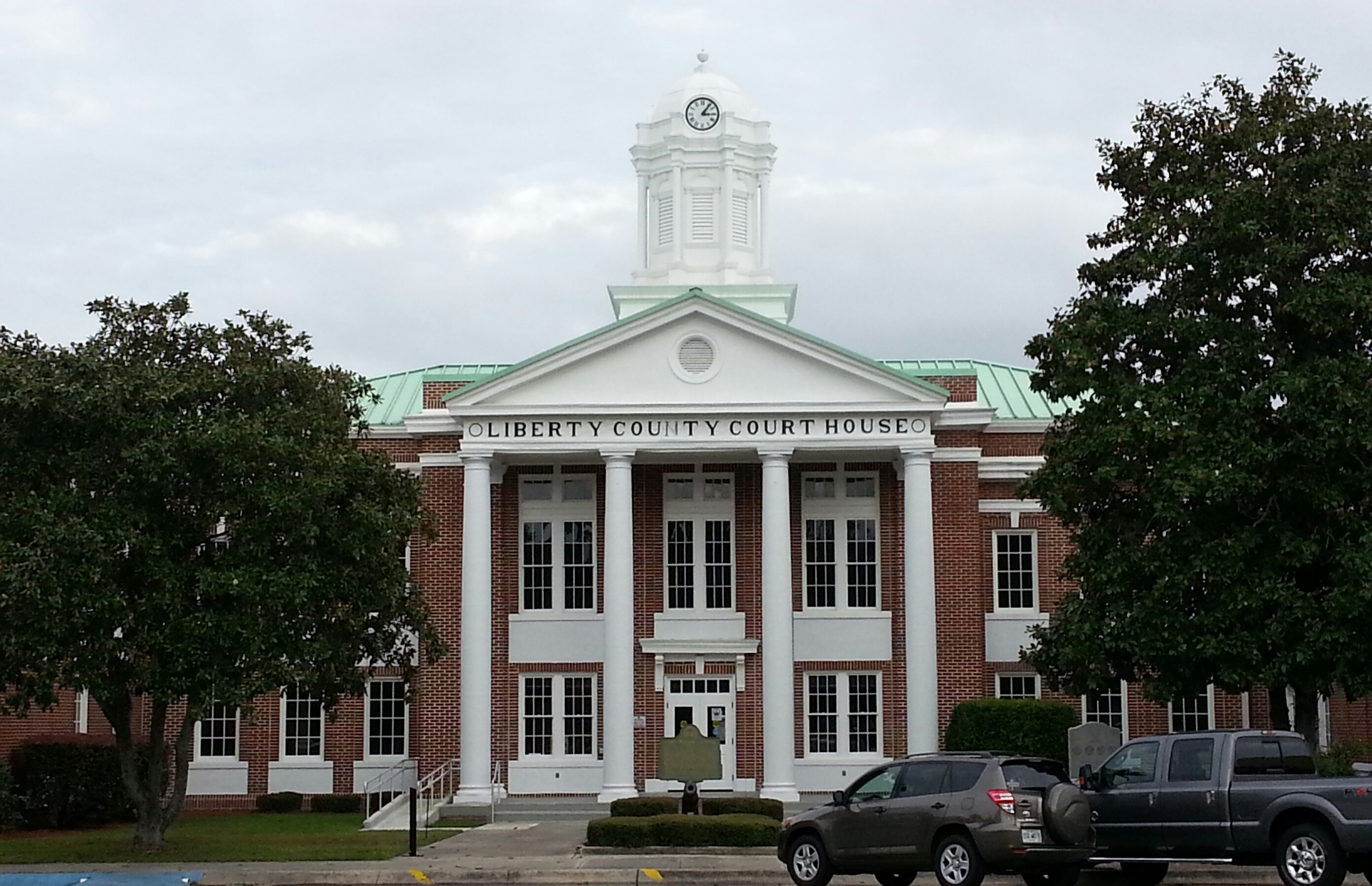
- Liberty County Courthouse in Hinesville

- Seal Logo

- Location within the U.S. state of Georgia
- Coordinates: 31°48′N 81°28′W
- Country: United States
- State: Georgia
- Founded: February 5, 1777; 249 years ago
- Named for: Liberty
- Seat: Hinesville
- Largest city: Hinesville

Area
  - Total: 603 sq mi (1,560 km^{2})
  - Land: 490 sq mi (1,300 km^{2})
  - Water: 113 sq mi (290 km^{2}) 18.7%

Population (2020)
  - Total: 65,256
  - Estimate (2025): 70,313 ▲
  - Density: 133/sq mi (51/km^{2})
- Time zone: UTC−5 (Eastern)
  - Summer (DST): UTC−4 (EDT)
- Congressional district: 1st
- Website: www.libertycountyga.gov

Liberty County is a county in the U.S. state of Georgia. As of the 2020 census, the population is 65,256. The county seat is Hinesville.

Liberty County is part of the Hinesville, Georgia Metropolitan Statistical Area, which is also included in the Savannah metropolitan area.

== History ==
The area that was to become Liberty County was originally occupied by the Guale Indians. In the early 16th century, the Spanish placed a Catholic mission called Santa Catalina de Guale on today's St. Catherine's Island to minister to the Guale. During the 18th century, the Guale became part of the Muscogee confederation. In 1733, Gen. James Oglethorpe negotiated with the local Muskogean Indian tribes for this land that became part of the new colony of Georgia. Settlement of the area by European settlers was sparse until 1752. In that year, a group of Congregationalists from Dorchester, South Carolina petitioned the royal government of Georgia for grants of land in an area known as the Midway District, located between the Ogeechee and South Newport Rivers. The land was granted to them, and they moved as a community with their families and Negro slaves into the area. They immediately began clearing the swamps and marshes and establishing rice fields.

On March 15, 1758, the royal government of Georgia created Saint John's Parish, which included this area between the Ogeechee River and South Newport River. The town of Sunbury was established on June 19, 1758, on the Medway River and quickly became the 2nd busiest port in Georgia, behind Savannah.

The Congregationalists who settled the Midway District were able to establish a flourishing rice culture with the use of Negro slaves to tend to the rice fields. These Congregationalists were 2nd and 3rd generations of people born in British America and had become more independent-minded and distinct in their political views from the other citizens of the colony. In 1774, they were among the first in the colony of Georgia to join the movement for the repeal of the Intolerable Acts. In 1775, unable to persuade the rest of the colony of Georgia to join with the other 12 colonies to send a representative to the 2nd Continental Congress, they sent their own representative from Saint John's Parish, Dr. Lyman Hall.

The royal government of Georgia came to an end in January 1776 when the patriotic Georgia Council of Safety arrested the governor, James Wright and took over the government of the colony. The new government, composed of many of the leading citizens of Saint John's parish, organized a convention and established the first Constitution for the State of Georgia.

On February 5, 1777, under the new constitution, the parishes of Saint John's, Saint Andrew's and Saint James' were consolidated and named Liberty County to honor the efforts of the citizens of Saint John's parish in pursuing the American ideal of liberty.

Sunbury was first designated the county seat in 1784. In 1797, the seat was transferred to Riceboro, and in 1837 it was transferred again to Hinesville.

=== 1922 lynching ===
On July 1, 1922, James Harvey and Joe Jordan, two African American men, were lynched by a mob of about 50 people in Liberty County during an escort by police from Jesup, Georgia to a jail in Savannah, Georgia. The event drew condemnation from both the local black community and from several prominent white citizens, with the preacher at Midway Methodist Church denouncing the acts and publishing a widely circulated letter condemning the Wayne County officials of being complicit in the murders. The incident prompted an investigation by the NAACP, and in total, 22 men were indicted, with four being convicted.

== Geography ==
According to the U.S. Census Bureau, the county has a total area of 603 square miles (1,560 km^{2}), of which 490 square miles (1,300 km^{2}) is land and 113 square miles (290 km^{2}) (18.7%) is water.

The eastern and southern portion of Liberty County is located in the Ogeechee Coastal sub-basin of the Ogeechee River basin. The northern and western portion of the county is located in the Canoochee River sub-basin of the Ogeechee River basin.

=== Major highways ===
- I-95 / SR 405 (unsigned)
- US 17 / SR 25
- US 84 / SR 38
  - SR 38 Conn.
- SR 119
- SR 144
- SR 196

=== Adjacent counties ===
- Chatham County – northeast
- Bryan County – north
- McIntosh County – south
- Long County – west
- Evans County – northwest
- Tattnall County – northwest

== Communities ==
=== Cities ===
- Allenhurst
- Flemington
- Gumbranch
- Hinesville (county seat)
- Midway
- Riceboro
- Walthourville

=== Census-designated place ===
- Fort Stewart

=== Unincorporated communities ===
- Sunbury
- Fleming
- Limerick
- McIntosh
- Seabrook

== Demographics ==
Historical population
Census	Pop.	Note	%±
1790	5,355		—
1800	5,313		−0.8%
1810	6,228		17.2%
1820	6,695		7.5%
1830	7,233		8.0%
1840	7,241		0.1%
1850	7,926		9.5%
1860	8,367		5.6%
1870	7,688		−8.1%
1880	10,649		38.5%
1890	12,887		21.0%
1900	13,093		1.6%
1910	12,924		−1.3%
1920	12,707		−1.7%
1930	8,153		−35.8%
1940	8,595		5.4%
1950	8,444		−1.8%
1960	14,487		71.6%
1970	17,569		21.3%
1980	37,583		113.9%
1990	52,745		40.3%
2000	61,610		16.8%
2010	63,453		3.0%
2020	65,256		2.8%
2025 (est.)	70,313	▲	7.7%
U.S. Decennial Census; 1790–1880 1890–1910; 1920–1930 1930–1940; 1940–1950 1960–1980; 1980–2000 2010

=== Racial and ethnic composition ===
Liberty County, Georgia – Racial and ethnic composition Note: the US Census treats Hispanic/Latino as an ethnic category. This table excludes Latinos from the racial categories and assigns them to a separate category. Hispanics/Latinos may be of any race.
Race / Ethnicity (NH = Non-Hispanic)	Pop 1980	Pop 1990	Pop 2000	Pop 2010	Pop 2020	% 1980	% 1990	% 2000	% 2010	% 2020
White alone (NH)	21,538	27,778	27,244	27,085	24,004	57.31%	52.66%	44.22%	42.69%	36.78%
Black or African American alone (NH)	13,605	20,285	26,025	26,018	27,309	36.20%	38.46%	42.24%	41.00%	41.85%
Native American or Alaska Native alone (NH)	122	242	279	287	225	0.32%	0.46%	0.45%	0.45%	0.34%
Asian alone (NH)	671	1,100	1,053	1,182	1,325	1.79%	2.09%	1.71%	1.86%	2.03%
Native Hawaiian or Pacific Islander alone (NH)	x	x	254	364	437	x	x	0.41%	0.57%	0.67%
Other race alone (NH)	190	104	199	142	322	0.51%	0.20%	0.32%	0.22%	0.49%
Mixed race or Multiracial (NH)	x	x	1,534	2,216	3,848	x	x	2.49%	3.49%	5.90%
Hispanic or Latino (any race)	1,457	3,236	5,022	6,159	7,786	3.88%	6.14%	8.15%	9.71%	11.93%
Total	37,583	52,745	61,610	63,453	65,256	100.00%	100.00%	100.00%	100.00%	100.00%

=== 2020 census ===
As of the 2020 census, there were 65,256 people and 16,657 families residing in the county. The median age was 29.0 years; 26.4% of residents were under the age of 18 and 9.4% of residents were 65 years of age or older. For every 100 females there were 99.9 males, and for every 100 females age 18 and over there were 98.2 males age 18 and over.

76.5% of residents lived in urban areas, while 23.5% lived in rural areas.

As of the 2020 census, the racial makeup of the county was 39.8% White, 43.1% Black or African American, 0.5% American Indian and Alaska Native, 2.1% Asian, 0.7% Native Hawaiian and Pacific Islander, 4.1% from some other race, and 9.7% from two or more races. Hispanic or Latino residents of any race comprised 11.9% of the population.

There were 23,413 households in the county, of which 39.0% had children under the age of 18 living with them and 28.0% had a female householder with no spouse or partner present. About 23.9% of all households were made up of individuals and 6.5% had someone living alone who was 65 years of age or older.

There were 26,564 housing units, of which 11.9% were vacant. Among occupied housing units, 50.0% were owner-occupied and 50.0% were renter-occupied. The homeowner vacancy rate was 2.3% and the rental vacancy rate was 12.3%.

== Education ==
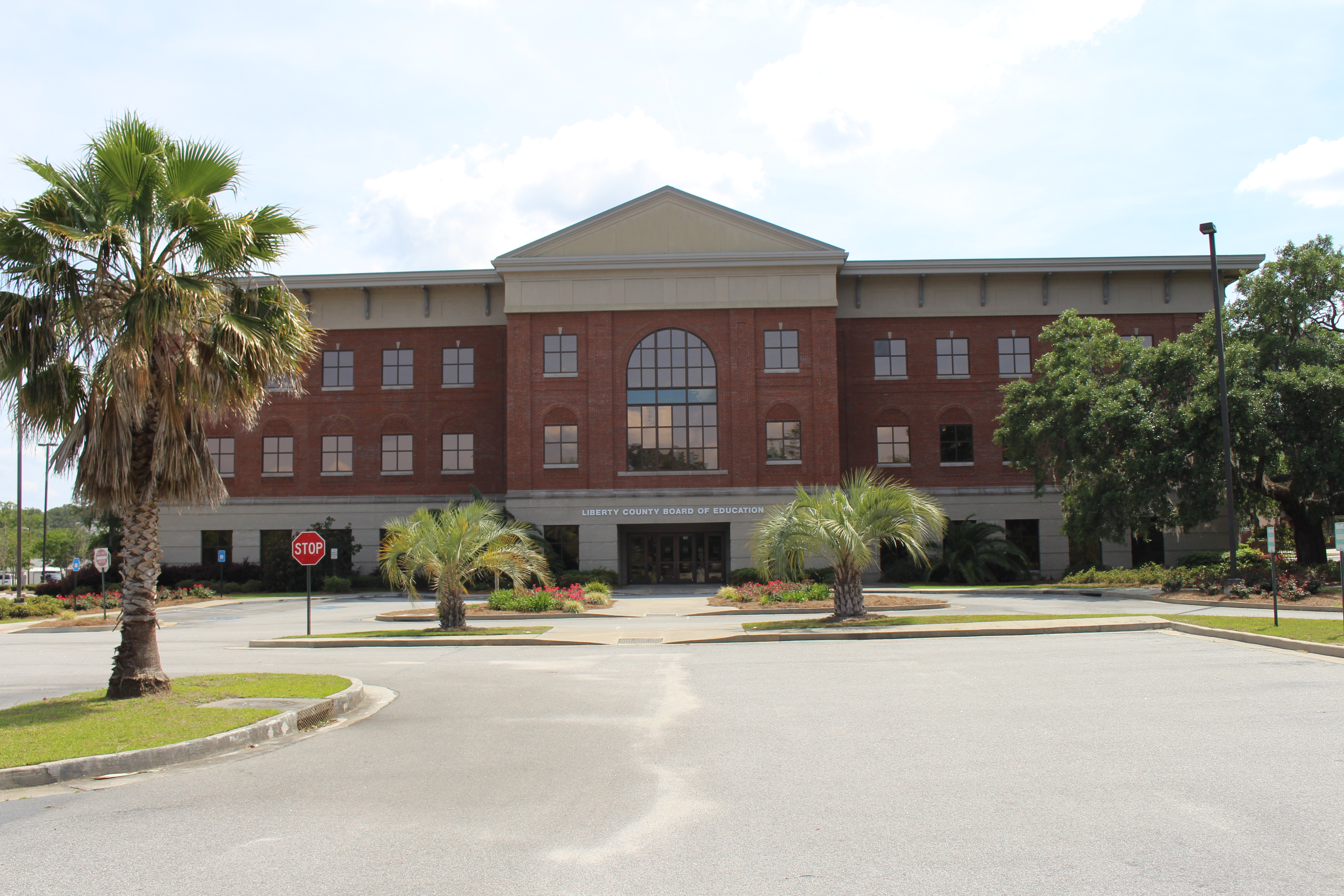
Liberty County School District headquarters

Liberty County School District is the designated school district for grades K-12 for the county, except parts in Fort Stewart. Fort Stewart has the Department of Defense Education Activity (DoDEA) as its local school district, for the elementary level. Students at the secondary level on Fort Stewart attend public schools operated by county school districts.

The Liberty district operates public schools, including the comprehensive high school Liberty County High School and the Bradwell Institute, as well as its educative middle schools Midway Middle School, Lewis Frasier Middle School, and Snelson-Golden Middle School.

They also provide a career academy, Liberty College & Career Academy (LCCA), for extra academics where students study for a profession they could seek out in the future.

== In the media ==
The 2014 independent film, A Promise, was filmed in Liberty County.

== Politics ==
As of the 2020s, Liberty County leans Democratic, having voted 58% for Kamala Harris in 2024. As a predominantly African-American county home to a prominent military base (Fort Stewart), Liberty County is a Democratic stronghold. It has consistently supported Democrats for president since 1992 (the longest active streak in Southeast Georgia) and was last contested at this level in the 2000s, when Southern Republican George W. Bush came within single digits of carrying the county in both of his elections (coming within less than 4% in 2004).

For elections to the United States House of Representatives, Liberty County is part of Georgia's 1st congressional district, currently represented by Buddy Carter. For elections to the Georgia State Senate, Liberty County is part of District 1. For elections to the Georgia House of Representatives, Liberty County is part of Districts 167 and 168.

United States presidential election results for Liberty County, Georgia
Year	Republican		Democratic		Third party(ies)	
Year	No.	%	No.	%	No.	%
1912	29	8.12%	251	70.31%	77	21.57%
1916	26	6.95%	245	65.51%	103	27.54%
1920	175	36.61%	303	63.39%	0	0.00%
1924	39	9.38%	334	80.29%	43	10.34%
1928	203	50.25%	201	49.75%	0	0.00%
1932	18	5.84%	289	93.83%	1	0.32%
1936	49	11.64%	369	87.65%	3	0.71%
1940	102	20.00%	407	79.80%	1	0.20%
1944	122	20.23%	481	79.77%	0	0.00%
1948	121	9.98%	820	67.66%	271	22.36%
1952	517	26.31%	1,448	73.69%	0	0.00%
1956	967	52.02%	892	47.98%	0	0.00%
1960	929	36.88%	1,590	63.12%	0	0.00%
1964	1,458	39.73%	2,212	60.27%	0	0.00%
1968	592	16.78%	1,572	44.55%	1,365	38.68%
1972	2,337	65.76%	1,217	34.24%	0	0.00%
1976	979	22.73%	3,328	77.27%	0	0.00%
1980	1,507	32.18%	3,099	66.18%	77	1.64%
1984	3,229	53.53%	2,803	46.47%	0	0.00%
1988	3,100	51.24%	2,906	48.03%	44	0.73%
1992	2,832	35.87%	3,853	48.80%	1,210	15.33%
1996	3,042	37.42%	4,462	54.89%	625	7.69%
2000	4,455	44.68%	5,347	53.62%	170	1.70%
2004	6,131	47.86%	6,619	51.67%	59	0.46%
2008	5,828	35.54%	10,474	63.87%	98	0.60%
2012	5,565	34.36%	10,457	64.57%	173	1.07%
2016	6,134	37.68%	9,556	58.70%	589	3.62%
2020	7,959	37.20%	13,104	61.25%	331	1.55%
2024	9,441	41.00%	13,459	58.45%	128	0.56%

United States Senate election results for Liberty County, Georgia2
Year	Republican		Democratic		Third party(ies)	
Year	No.	%	No.	%	No.	%
2020	7,743	36.71%	12,738	60.40%	610	2.89%
2020	6,485	35.41%	11,830	64.59%	0	0.00%

United States Senate election results for Liberty County, Georgia3
Year	Republican		Democratic		Third party(ies)	
Year	No.	%	No.	%	No.	%
2020	3,759	17.94%	7,723	36.86%	9,471	45.20%
2020	6,457	35.22%	11,875	64.78%	0	0.00%
2022	5,490	35.72%	9,615	62.56%	264	1.72%
2022	5,021	35.28%	9,210	64.72%	0	0.00%

Georgia Gubernatorial election results for Liberty County
Year	Republican		Democratic		Third party(ies)	
Year	No.	%	No.	%	No.	%
2022	6,069	39.37%	9,235	59.91%	111	0.72%

== Notable people ==
- Joseph LeConte (1823–1901), physician and geologist, born in Liberty County

== Gallery ==
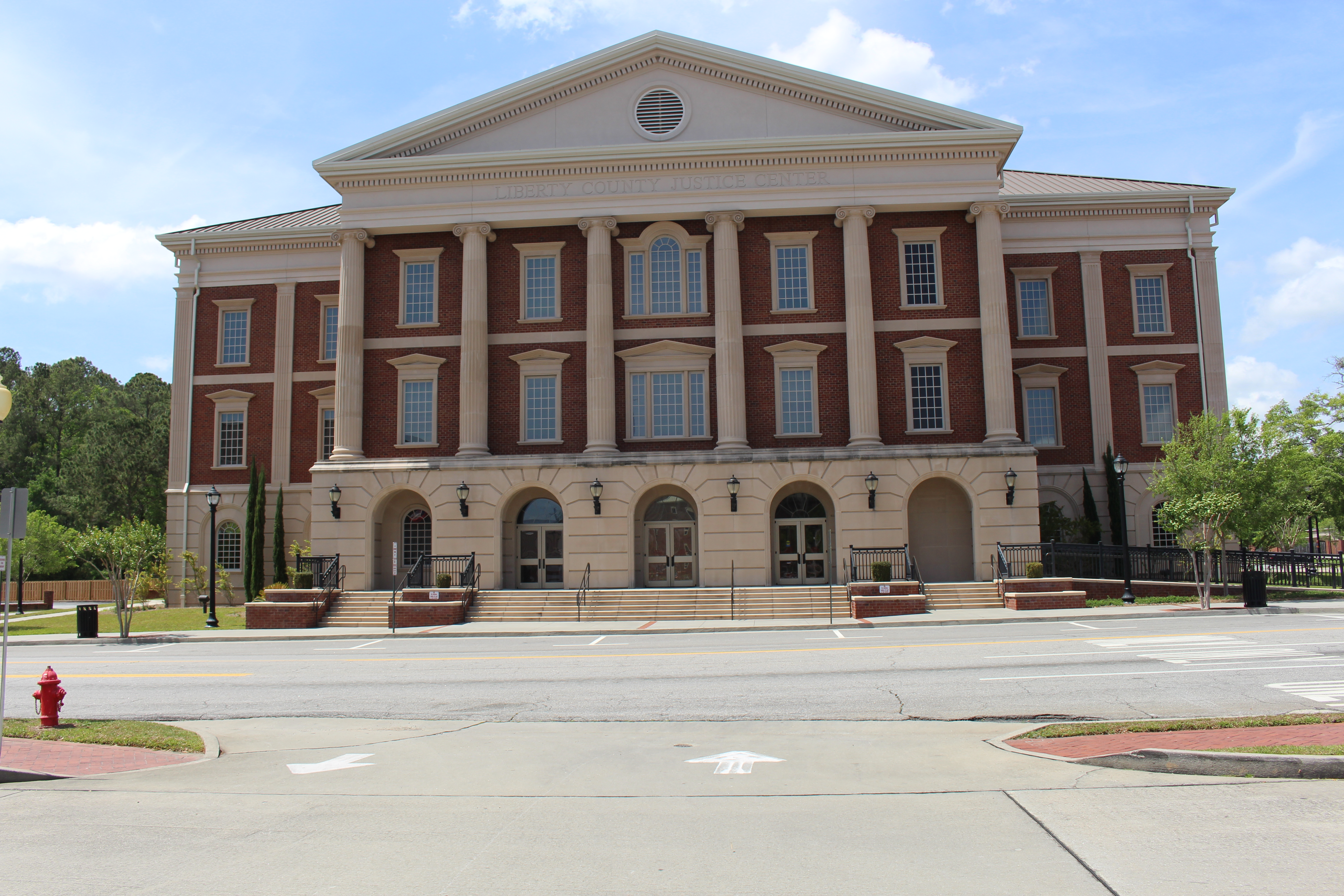
Liberty County Justice Center

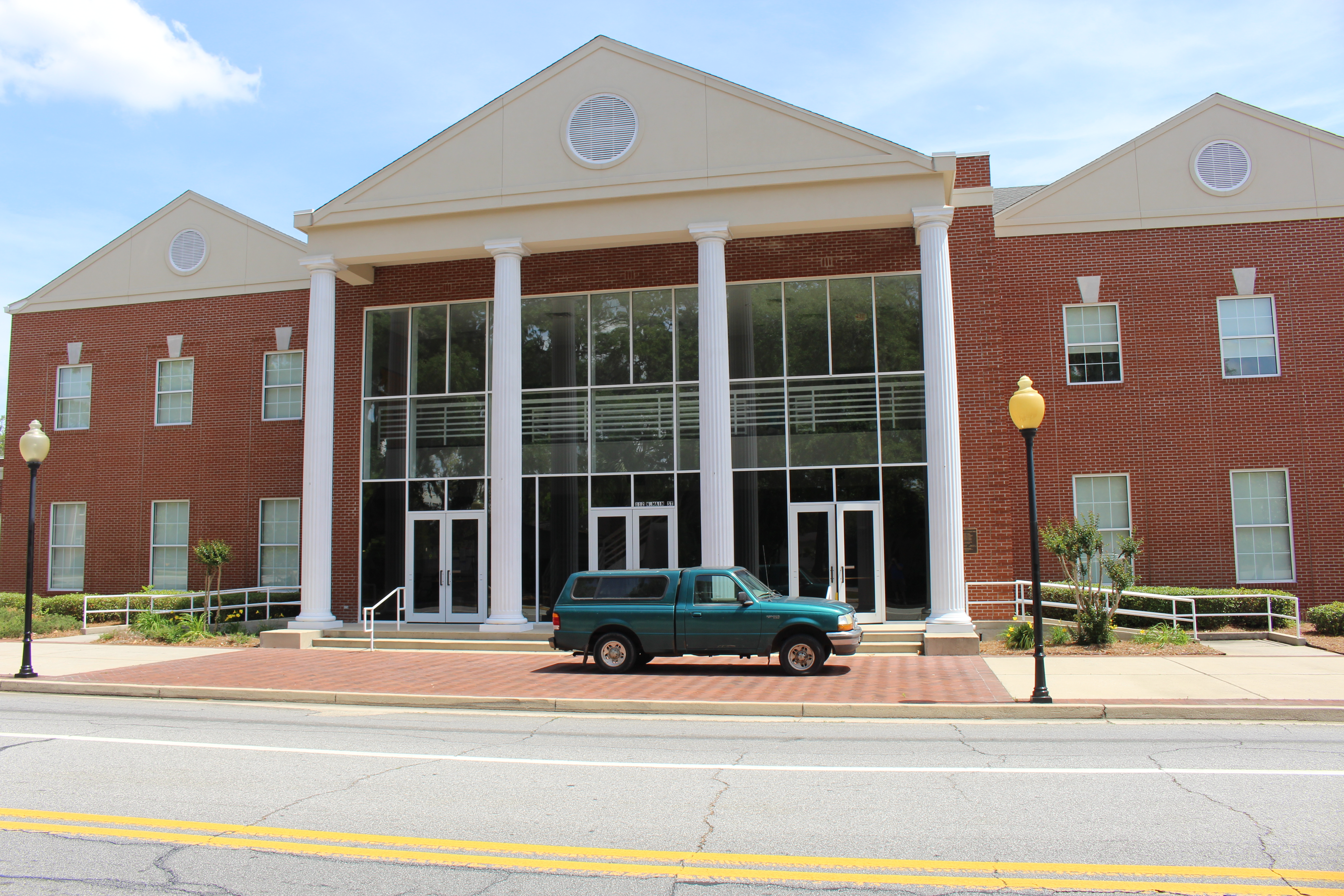
Liberty County Courthouse Annex

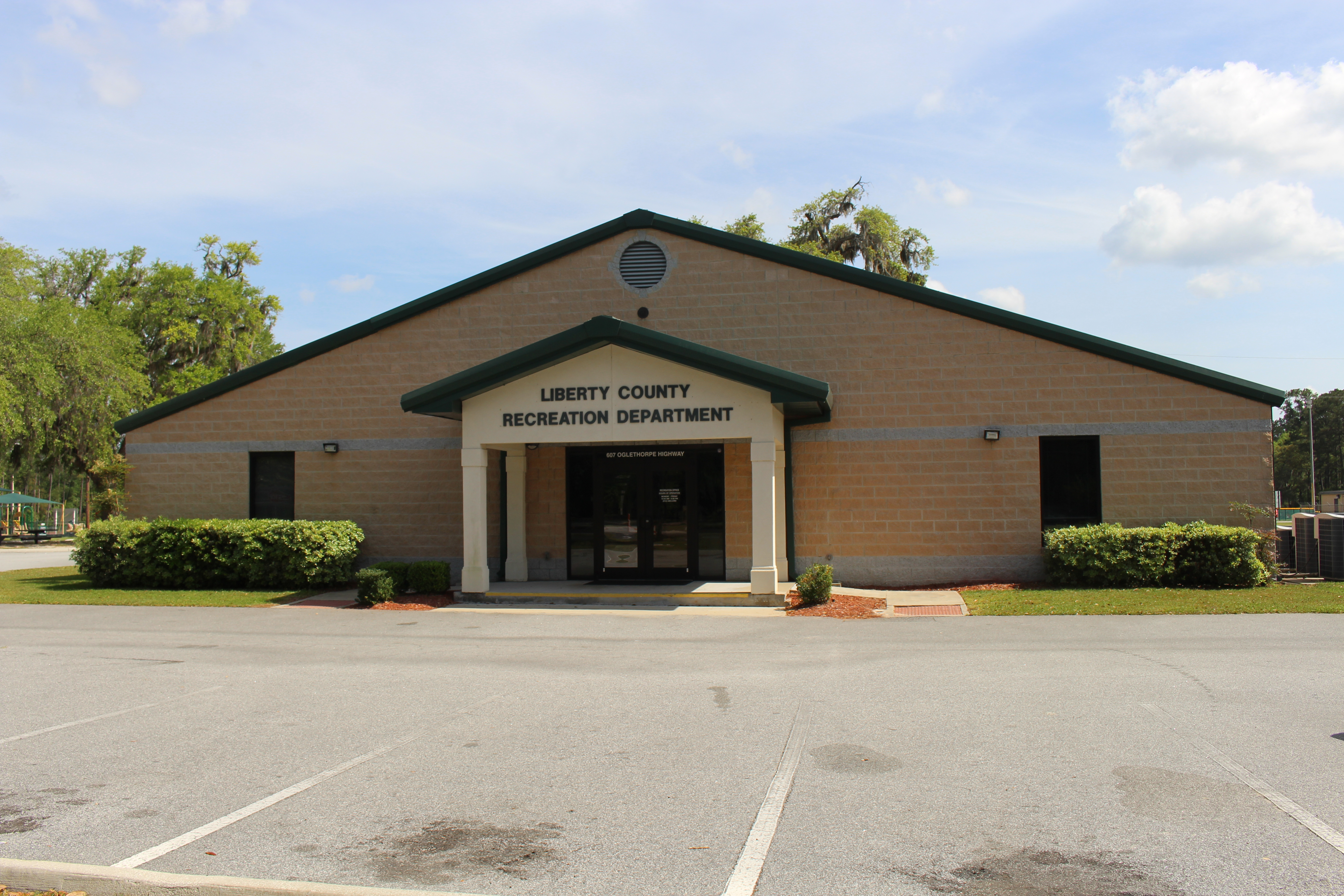
Liberty County Recreation Department

== See also ==
- National Register of Historic Places listings in Liberty County, Georgia
- List of counties in Georgia
