= National Register of Historic Places listings in Boone County, Indiana =

Location of Boone County in Indiana

This is a list of the National Register of Historic Places listings in Boone County, Indiana.

This is intended to be a complete list of the properties and districts on the National Register of Historic Places in Boone County, Indiana, United States. Latitude and longitude coordinates are provided for many National Register properties and districts; these locations may be seen together in a map.

There are 14 properties and districts listed on the National Register in the county.

Properties and districts located in incorporated areas display the name of the municipality, while properties and districts in unincorporated areas display the name of their civil township. Properties and districts split between multiple jurisdictions display the names of all jurisdictions.

This National Park Service list is complete through NPS recent listings posted August 22, 2025.

== Current listings ==
	Name on the Register	Image	Date listed	Location	City or town	Description
1	Boone County Courthouse	Boone County Courthouse	September 22, 1986 (#86002703)	Courthouse Sq. 40°02′52″N 86°28′07″W	Lebanon	
2	Pryor Brock Farmstead	Pryor Brock Farmstead	June 27, 2008 (#08000569)	8602 County Road 500S, west of Zionsville; 39°58′05″N 86°18′21″W	Eagle Township	Carpenter's rendering of Italianate architecture, symbolic of the "golden age" of Hoosier agriculture
3	Strange Nathanial Cragun House	Strange Nathanial Cragun House	December 15, 2011 (#11000908)	404 W. Main St. 40°02′52″N 86°28′18″W	Lebanon	
4	Howard School	Howard School	September 24, 2009 (#09000754)	4555 E. County Road 750S, north of Brownsburg; 39°55′51″N 86°22′56″W	Perry Township	
5	Lebanon Courthouse Square Historic District	Lebanon Courthouse Square Historic District	September 12, 2016 (#16000610)	Roughly bounded by North, East, South, Superior, and West Sts. 40°02′54″N 86°28′07″W	Lebanon	
6	Maplelawn Farmstead	Maplelawn Farmstead	September 15, 2011 (#11000656)	9575 Whitestown Rd., near Zionsville; 39°57′53″N 86°17′15″W	Eagle Township	
7	Oak Hill Cemetery	Oak Hill Cemetery	March 26, 2014 (#14000068)	935 E. Washington St. 40°02′50″N 86°27′16″W	Lebanon	
8	Simpson-Breedlove House	Simpson-Breedlove House	March 15, 2016 (#16000075)	3650 U.S. Route 421; 39°59′24″N 86°15′40″W	Union Township	
9	Thorntown Public Library	Thorntown Public Library	September 22, 1986 (#86002708)	124 N. Market St. 40°07′50″N 86°36′22″W	Thorntown	
10	Traders Point Eagle Creek Rural Historic District	Traders Point Eagle Creek Rural Historic District	June 17, 2009 (#09000433)	Roughly between Interstate 865, Interstate 465, and Lafayette Rd. 39°55′32″N 86°17′47″W	Eagle Township	Extends into Pike Township in Marion County
11	Traders Point Hunt Rural Historic District	Traders Point Hunt Rural Historic District	June 17, 2009 (#09000421)	Roughly bounded by State Road 334, Interstate 865, Old Hunt Club Rd., and County Road 850E, southwest of Zionsville; 39°56′25″N 86°19′17″W	Eagle Township	Eagle Township and Pike Township, Indiana MPS.
12	Town Hall (Castle Hall)	Town Hall (Castle Hall)	June 9, 1983 (#83000115)	65 E. Cedar St. 39°57′05″N 86°15′40″W	Zionsville	
13	Ulen Historic District	Ulen Historic District	September 16, 2015 (#15000591)	Roughly Ulen Country Club and Golf Course, and houses along Ulen Boulevard and East Dr. 40°03′48″N 86°27′49″W	Ulen	
14	Andrew B. VanHuys Round Barn	Andrew B. VanHuys Round Barn	April 2, 1993 (#93000181)	755 W. County Road 125 S., south of Lebanon; 40°01′17″N 86°29′00″W	Center Township	

== Former listings ==
	Name on the Register	Image	Date listed	Date removed	Location	City or town	Description
1	Scotland Bridge	Scotland Bridge	March 17, 1994 (#94000228)	March 5, 2024	Lost Rd. (County Road 200E) over Sugar Creek, east of Mechanicsburg; 40°10′36″N 86°25′54″W	Clinton Township	Extends into Clinton County

== See also ==
- List of National Historic Landmarks in Indiana
- National Register of Historic Places listings in Indiana
- Listings in neighboring counties: Clinton, Hamilton, Hendricks, Marion, Montgomery
- List of Indiana state historical markers in Boone County
