= List of Indiana state historical markers in Boone County =

Location of Boone County in Indiana

This is a list of the Indiana state historical markers in Boone County.

This is intended to be a complete list of the official state historical markers placed in Boone County, Indiana, United States by the Indiana Historical Bureau. The locations of the historical markers and their latitude and longitude coordinates are included below when available, along with their names, years of placement, and topics as recorded by the Historical Bureau. There are 10 historical markers located in Boone County.

== Historical markers ==
Marker title	Image	Year placed	Location	Topics
Indian Cemetery/Eel River Tribe of Miamis		1961	Northern side of State Road 47, 0.5 miles east of Thorntown; 40°7′42.6″N 86°35′39.6″W	Cemetery, American Indian/Native American
Patrick H. Sullivan 1794-1879		1962	225 W. Hawthorne at the P.H. Sullivan Museum in Zionsville; 39°56′55″N 86°15′45″W	Early Settlement and Exploration, Military
Geographical Center of Indiana (Marker no longer standing)		1966	US 421, 1.5 miles north of SR 334, Zionsville	Geography
Michigan Road		1966	Western side of U.S. Route 421 north of 121st Street, north and east of Zionsville; 39°57′50″N 86°14′53.5″W	Transportation, American Indian/Native American
The Boone County REMC		1985	Interstate 65 northbound rest stop, 1 mile north of the State Road 47 interchange at Exit 146, and 7.5 miles north of Lebanon; 40°9′27″N 86°32′15″W	Science, Medicine, and Inventions, Business, Industry, and Labor
The Boone County REMC		1985	Interstate 65 northbound rest stop, 1.5 miles north of the State Road 47 interchange at Exit 146, and 7.5 miles north of Lebanon; 40°10′18″N 86°33′9″W	Science, Medicine, and Inventions, Business, Industry, and Labor
Samuel M. Ralston		2018	104 E. Washington St., Lebanon; 40°2′54.17″N 86°28′4.26″W	Government
Sugar Creek Community		2019	Colored Cemetery location, 6770 North 825 West, Thorntown; 40°8′30″N 86°37′43″W	Early Settlement, African American
Herman B Wells		2020	2 W. Main St., Jamestown; 39°55′33.81″N 86°37′40″W	Education
Henry C. Ulen, 1871-1963		2021	Ulen Country Club, 100 Country Club Dr., Lebanon; 40°4′0.27″N 86°27′57.51″W	Buildings and Architecture; Business, Industry, and Labor; Transportation

== See also ==
- List of Indiana state historical markers
- National Register of Historic Places listings in Boone County, Indiana
