= Eagle Township, Boone County, Indiana =

Eagle Township
- Township
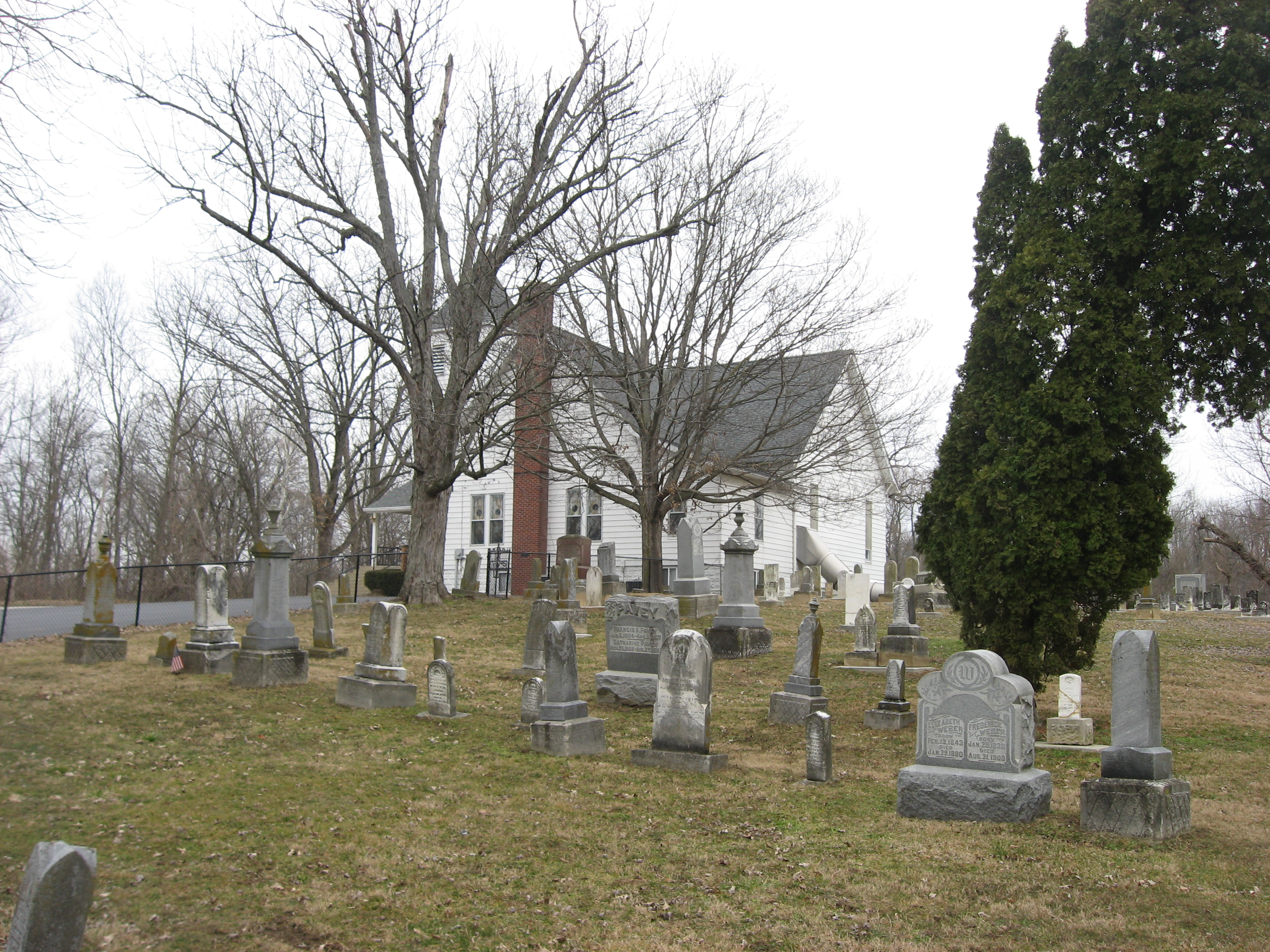
- Salem United Methodist Church, located in a rural part of the township

- Location of Eagle Township in Boone County
- Coordinates: 39°57′27″N 86°17′44″W
- Country: United States
- State: Indiana
- County: Boone

Government
  - Type: Indiana township

Area
  - Total: 26.73 sq mi (69.2 km^{2})
  - Land: 26.65 sq mi (69.0 km^{2})
  - Water: 0.09 sq mi (0.23 km^{2})
- Elevation: 928 ft (283 m)

Population (2010)
  - Total: 21,977
  - Density: 824.8/sq mi (318.5/km^{2})
- Time zone: UTC-5 (Eastern (EST))
  - Summer (DST): UTC-4 (EDT)
- FIPS code: 18-19288
- GNIS feature ID: 453269

Eagle Township is one of twelve townships in Boone County, Indiana. As of the 2010 census, its population was 21,977 and it contained 8,231 housing units.

== History ==
Pryor Brock Farmstead, Maplelawn Farmstead, Traders Point Eagle Creek Rural Historic District, and Traders Point Hunt Rural Historic District are listed on the National Register of Historic Places.

== Geography ==
According to the 2010 census, the township has a total area of 26.73 square miles (69.2 km^{2}), of which 26.65 square miles (69.0 km^{2}) (or 99.70%) is land and 0.09 square miles (0.23 km^{2}) (or 0.34%) is water.

=== Cities and towns ===
- Zionsville
- Whitestown

=== Unincorporated towns or communities ===
- Eagle Village
- Royalton

=== Adjacent townships ===
- Perry (west)
- Union (north)
- Worth (northwest)
- Brown Township, Hendricks County (southwest)
- Clay Township, Hamilton County (east)
- Pike Township, Marion County (south)
- Washington Township, Hamilton County (northeast)

=== Major highways ===
- Interstate 65
- Interstate 465
- Interstate 865
- U.S. Route 421
- Indiana State Road 334

=== Cemeteries ===
The township contains six cemeteries: Clarkstown, Cox, Jones, Lincoln Memory Gardens, Pitzer, Salem and Sheets.
