= Boone County Airport =

Boone County Airport may refer to:

- Boone County Airport (Arkansas) in Harrison, Arkansas, United States (FAA: HRO)
- Boone County Airport (Indiana) in Lebanon, Indiana, United States (FAA: 6I4)
- Boone County Airport (Kentucky), now Cincinnati/Northern Kentucky International Airport
