= Florence Smithburn =

American painter (1904–1989)

- Born: October 16, 1904; New Augusta, Indiana, U.S.
- Died: January 31, 1989 (aged 84); Indianapolis, Indiana, U.S.
- Notable work: Untitled (Gust of Air From Subway Grate)
- Movement: Regionalism
- Spouse: Kenneth C. Smithburn

Florence Bartley Smithburn (October 16, 1904 – January 31, 1989) was an American painter and printmaker.

Born in New Augusta, Indiana, a community which has since been incorporated into Indianapolis, Florence Bartley graduated from the local high school in 1922. From then until 1926 she attended the John Herron Art Institute; she also had lessons at the Grand Central School of Art and the Art Students League of New York. Her instructors included William Forsyth, Paul Hadley, George Pearse Ennis, Richard Lahey, and Harry Sternberg. She showed work at the Hoosier Salon in 1929 and 1930 and at the Indiana State Fair from 1929 until 1934, winning prizes from both entities; she continued exhibiting for the rest of her career, showing mainly watercolors and drawings. On June 17, 1927, she married physician Kenneth C. Smithburn, moving with him to New York City in 1930. In May 1937, she had a one-person show of her paintings at the Argent Galleries. She eventually accompanied him to Africa, after a stint visiting the galleries of England, France, and Italy. In 1938 the couple settled in Entebbe, where for ten years she painted scenes of local native life while her husband researched yellow fever for the Rockefeller Research Institute. She contributed her artistic skills to the work of the Yellow Fever Research Institute (currently the Uganda Virus Research Institute) by creating maps to illustrate their scientific publications. Smithburn rarely sold her paintings due to financial security; her husband died in 1974, and she died in Indianapolis in 1989.

Stylistically, Smithburn has been characterized as a Regionalist painter. One of her lithographs, Untitled (Gust of Air From Subway Grate) of c. 1935, is owned by the National Gallery of Art, and the Herbert F. Johnson Museum of Art at Cornell University. She is also represented in the collections of the Indianapolis Museum of Art and the Georgia Museum of Art. She was a member of the Hoosier Salon, the National Association of Women Painters and Sculptors (NAWPS), and the Indiana Artists Association.
