= Traders Point Eagle Creek Rural Historic District =

Historic district in Indiana, United States

- U.S. National Register of Historic Places
- U.S. Historic district
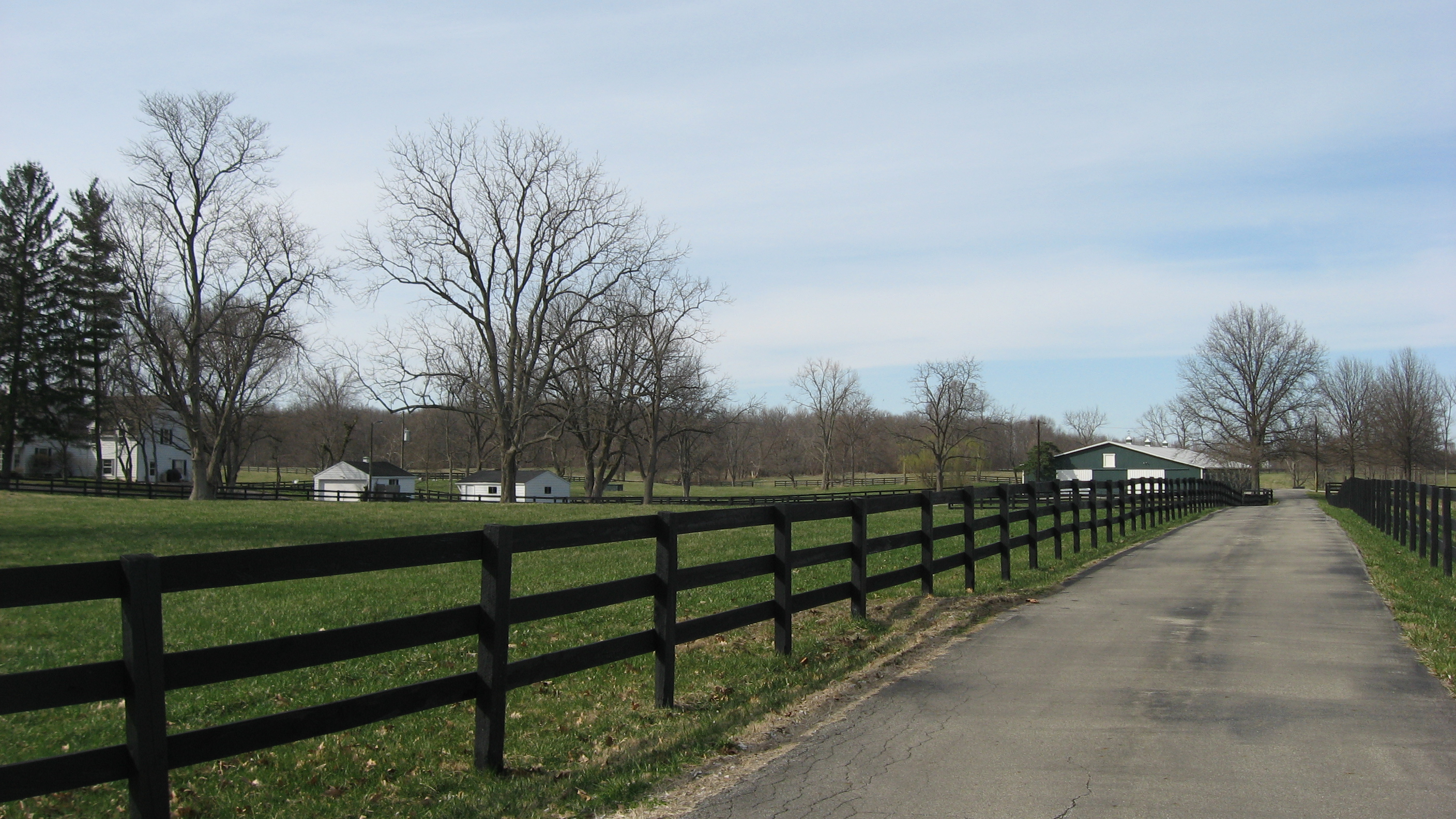
- Farm in the Traders Point Rural Historic District, March 2011

- Location within Boone County, Indiana Location within Indiana Location within the United States
- Location: Roughly between Interstate 865, Interstate 465, and Lafayette Rd., Pike Township, Marion County, Indiana and Eagle Township, Boone County, Indiana
- Coordinates: 39°55′32″N 86°17′47″W
- Area: 1,489 acres (603 ha)
- Built by: Osler, Richard
- Architectural style: Federal, Greek Revival
- MPS: Eagle Township and Pike Township, Indiana MPS
- NRHP reference No.: 09000433
- Added to NRHP: June 17, 2009

Traders Point Eagle Creek Rural Historic District is a national historic district located at Pike Township and Eagle Township, Boone County, Indiana. The district encompasses 109 contributing buildings, 40 contributing sites, and 12 contributing structures in a rural area near Indianapolis. The district is characterized by the agricultural landscape, farmsteads and estates, recreational landscapes, transportation features including roads and bridges, and historic cemeteries.

It was listed on the National Register of Historic Places in 2009.

== See also ==
- National Register of Historic Places listings in Boone County, Indiana
- National Register of Historic Places listings in Marion County, Indiana
