= Eagle Village =

Eagle Village may refer to:

- Eagle Village, Alaska
- Eagle Village, Indiana
