= Royalton, Indiana =

- Unincorporated community
- Boone County's location in Indiana

- Location in Boone County
- Coordinates: 39°55′37″N 86°20′18″W
- Country: United States
- State: Indiana
- County: Boone
- Township: Eagle
- Elevation: 919 ft (280 m)
- Time zone: UTC-5 (Eastern (EST))
  - Summer (DST): UTC-4 (EDT)
- ZIP code: 46077
- FIPS code: 18-66258
- GNIS feature ID: 442375

Royalton is an unincorporated community in Eagle Township, Boone County, in the U.S. state of Indiana.

== History ==
A post office was established at Royalton (but was called Rodmans until 1838) in 1832, and remained in operation until it was discontinued in 1903.

== Geography and Location ==
Royalton is located at 39°55′37″N 86°20′18″W. Royalton is located along Indianapolis Rd approximately 0.7 miles northwest of Marion County. The town is made up of three main streets - Royal Avenue, Circle Drive, and Harmon Avenue.
