= Lebanon, Indiana =

- City
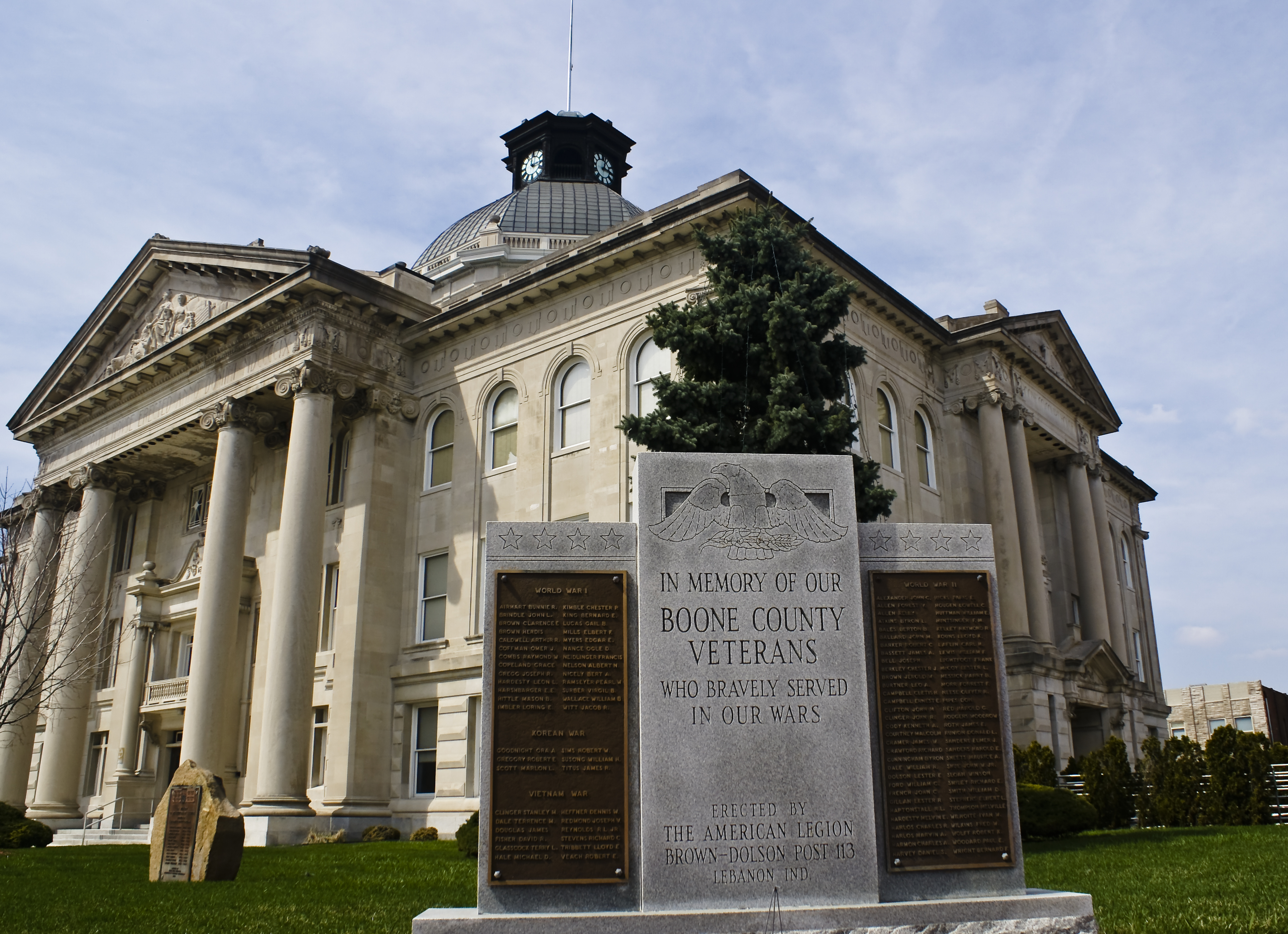
- Boone County Courthouse in Lebanon

- Flag Logo
- Motto: The Friendly City
- Location of Lebanon in Boone County, Indiana.
- Coordinates: 40°02′50″N 86°27′00″W
- Country: United States
- State: Indiana
- County: Boone
- Townships: Center, Perry, Jefferson, Washington, Worth
- Established: 1830
- Incorporated (town): 1853
- Incorporated (city): 1875

Government
  - Mayor: Matthew “Matt” Gentry (R)

Area
  - Total: 17.32 sq mi (44.87 km^{2})
  - Land: 17.31 sq mi (44.83 km^{2})
  - Water: 0.015 sq mi (0.04 km^{2}) 0.13%
- Elevation: 951 ft (290 m)

Population (2020)
  - Total: 16,662
  - Density: 962.7/sq mi (371.71/km^{2})
- Time zone: UTC-5 (EST)
  - Summer (DST): UTC-4 (EDT)
- ZIP code: 46052
- Area code: 765
- FIPS code: 18-42624
- GNIS feature ID: 2395662
- Website: www.lebanon.in.gov

Lebanon is a city in and the county seat of Boone County, Indiana, United States. The population was 16,662 at the 2020 census. Lebanon is located in central Indiana, approximately 29 miles (47 km) northwest of downtown Indianapolis and 36 miles (58 km) southeast of Lafayette.

== History ==
Lebanon was officially established on April 30, 1830. It was named by a pioneer settler who saw a stand of hickory trees on the site and was reminded of the Biblical cedars of Lebanon. The first post office at Lebanon was established in 1832. In 1853, Lebanon was incorporated as a town and later became a city in 1875.

=== Historical sites ===
Lebanon is the home of the Historic Cragun House. Built in 1893, it was once the home of Strange Nathaniel Cragun and his family. The family travelled the world, and their house is now a living history museum full of the pieces they collected from their travels as well as original furniture from the dwelling. This Victorian home is owned and maintained by the Boone County Historical Society and serves as headquarters for the organization. The Cragun House has been added to the National Register of Historic Places.

Also listed on the National Register of Historic Places are the Boone County Courthouse and Oak Hill Cemetery.

== Geography ==
According to the 2010 census, Lebanon has a total area of 15.566 sq mi (40.32 km^{2}), of which 15.55 sq mi (40.27 km^{2}) (or 99.9%) is land and 0.016 sq mi (0.04 km^{2}) (or 0.1%) is water.

== Notable architecture ==
The Boone County Courthouse of Lebanon is notable for its single-piece vertical Ionic order limestone columns. They were at one time believed to be the largest single-piece limestone columns in the world.

Historical population
Census	Pop.	Note	%±
1860	892		—
1870	1,572		76.2%
1880	2,625		67.0%
1890	3,682		40.3%
1900	4,465		21.3%
1910	5,474		22.6%
1920	6,257		14.3%
1930	6,445		3.0%
1940	6,529		1.3%
1950	7,631		16.9%
1960	9,523		24.8%
1970	9,766		2.6%
1980	11,456		17.3%
1990	12,059		5.3%
2000	14,222		17.9%
2010	15,792		11.0%
2020	16,662		5.5%
U.S. Decennial Census

== Demographics ==
=== 2020 census ===
As of the 2020 census, Lebanon had a population of 16,662. The median age was 39.1 years. 22.4% of residents were under the age of 18 and 18.0% of residents were 65 years of age or older. For every 100 females there were 95.6 males, and for every 100 females age 18 and over there were 91.8 males age 18 and over.

97.2% of residents lived in urban areas, while 2.8% lived in rural areas.

There were 7,045 households in Lebanon, of which 28.2% had children under the age of 18 living in them. Of all households, 41.2% were married-couple households, 19.8% were households with a male householder and no spouse or partner present, and 29.6% were households with a female householder and no spouse or partner present. About 33.1% of all households were made up of individuals and 13.4% had someone living alone who was 65 years of age or older.

There were 7,563 housing units, of which 6.8% were vacant. The homeowner vacancy rate was 1.5% and the rental vacancy rate was 6.5%.

Racial composition as of the 2020 census
Race	Number	Percent
White	15,061	90.4%
Black or African American	208	1.2%
American Indian and Alaska Native	57	0.3%
Asian	85	0.5%
Native Hawaiian and Other Pacific Islander	4	0.0%
Some other race	261	1.6%
Two or more races	986	5.9%
Hispanic or Latino (of any race)	870	5.2%

=== 2010 census ===
As of the census of 2010, there were 15,792 people, 6,433 households, and 4,049 families living in the city. The population density was 1,014.9 inhabitants per square mile (391.9/km^{2}). There were 7,057 housing units at an average density of 453.5 per square mile (175.1/km^{2}). The racial makeup of the city was 96.1% White, 0.5% African American, 0.2% Native American, 0.6% Asian, 1.1% from other races, and 1.5% from two or more races. Hispanic or Latino of any race were 3.1% of the population.

There were 6,433 households, of which 32.6% had children under the age of 18 living with them, 46.0% were married couples living together, 11.8% had a female householder with no husband present, 5.2% had a male householder with no wife present, and 37.1% were non-families. 30.9% of all households were made up of individuals, and 11.8% had someone living alone who was 65 years of age or older. The average household size was 2.38 and the average family size was 2.97.

The median age in the city was 37.5 years. 24.5% of residents were under the age of 18; 8.5% were between the ages of 18 and 24; 26.8% were from 25 to 44; 25.6% were from 45 to 64; and 14.7% were 65 years of age or older. The gender makeup of the city was 48.0% male and 52.0% female.

=== 2000 census ===
As of the census of 2000, there were 14,222 people, 5,834 households, and 3,780 families living in the city. The population density was 1,952.9 inhabitants per square mile (754.0/km^{2}). There were 6,202 housing units at an average density of 851.6 per square mile (328.8/km^{2}). The racial makeup of the city was 97.67% White, 0.33% African American, 0.39% Native American, 0.37% Asian, 0.58% from other races, and 0.65% from two or more races. Hispanic or Latino of any race were 1.61% of the population.

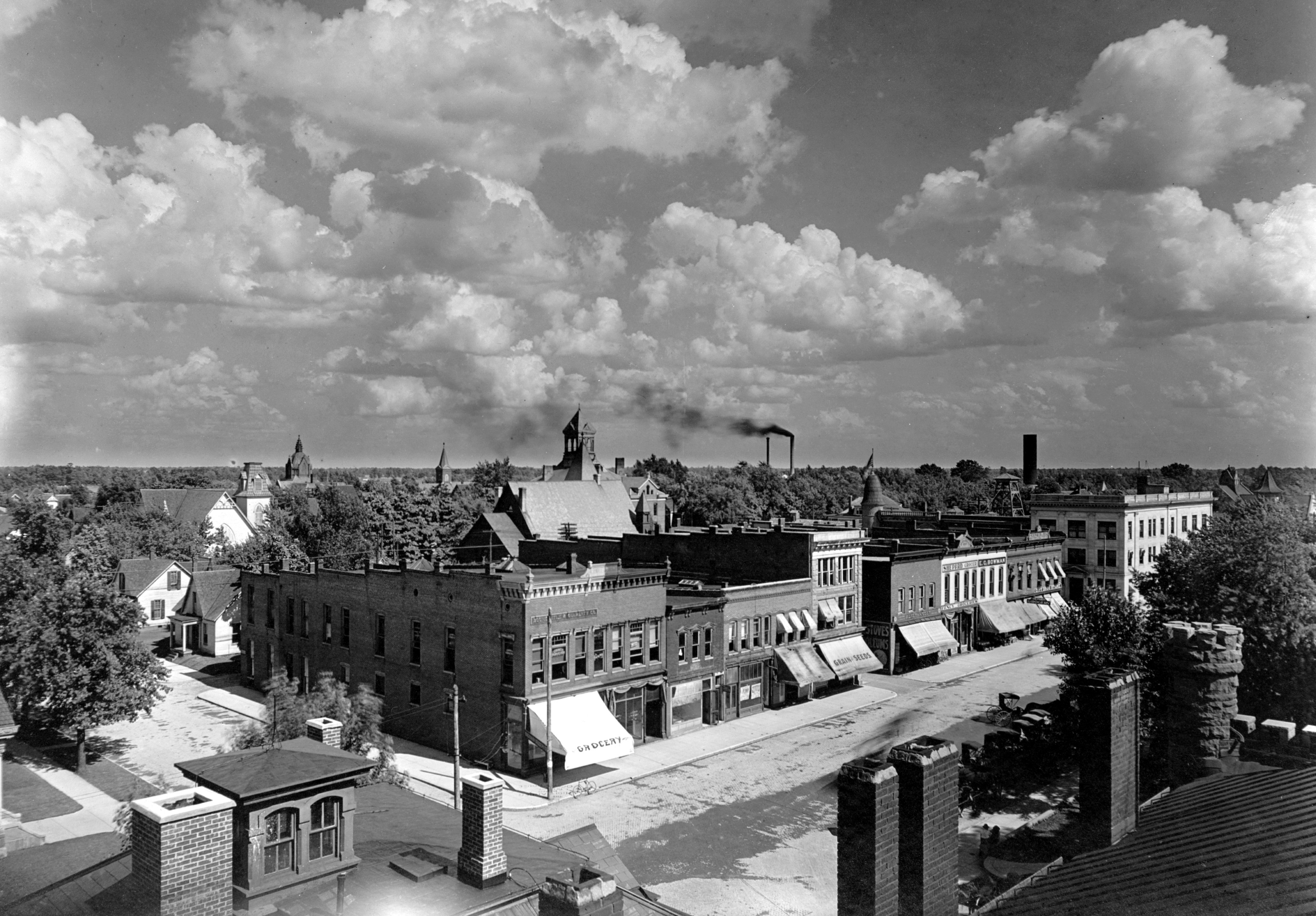
Lebanon circa 1909.

There were 5,834 households, out of which 32.7% had children under the age of 18 living with them, 50.5% were married couples living together, 10.9% had a female householder with no husband present, and 35.2% were non-families. 29.9% of all households were made up of individuals, and 11.8% had someone living alone who was 65 years of age or older. The average household size was 2.40 and the average family size was 2.99.

In the city, the population was spread out, with 26.7% under the age of 18, 9.0% from 18 to 24, 30.8% from 25 to 44, 19.9% from 45 to 64, and 13.7% who were 65 years of age or older. The median age was 34 years. For every 100 females, there were 91.2 males. For every 100 females age 18 and over, there were 85.8 males.

The median income for a household in the city was $37,791, and the median income for a family was $47,769. Males had a median income of $35,614 versus $22,791 for females. The per capita income for the city was $18,245. About 4.4% of families and 7.1% of the population were below the poverty line, including 6.4% of those under age 18 and 10.6% of those age 65 or over.

== Government ==
The government consists of a mayor and a city council. The mayor and clerk-treasurer are elected in a citywide vote. The city council consists of seven members, five of whom are elected from individual districts, while two are elected at-large.

=== Elected officials ===
- Mayor: Matthew Gentry
- Clerk-Treasurer: Tonya Thayer
- City Council, District 1: Mike Kincaid
- City Council, District 2: Keith Campbell
- City Council, District 3: Sandra Jasionowski
- City Council, District 4: Dick Robertson
- City Council, District 5: John Copeland
- City Council, At Large: Sierra Messenger
- City Council, At Large: Robert Hawkins

== Politics ==
In the mayoral election of November 2007, Republican City Council President John Lasley won the election with 48% of the vote, to Democrat Roger Neal's 27% and Independent George Piper's 25%.

30% of registered voters cast votes in the 2007 election.

Lasley died on May 2, 2009. In the 2008 election, Boone County (the county in which Lebanon is located) voted 62% for Republican presidential candidate John McCain and more than 80% for Republican gubernatorial candidate, Mitch Daniels.

== Education ==
Lebanon Community School Corporation has six schools under its jurisdiction: four elementary schools, a middle school and a high school. The body enrolled 3,381 students for the 2019–2020 school year, and it is recognized as a "B" district by the Indiana Department of Education. The six schools are:

- Lebanon Senior High School
- Lebanon Middle School
- Central Elementary School
- Hattie B. Stokes Elementary School
- Harney Elementary School
- Perry-Worth Elementary School

The Lebanon Public Library was established as a Carnegie library with an initial grant of $15,000 in 1903.

== Economy ==
Major employers in Lebanon include Lebanon Community School Corporation; the U.S. headquarters of German power tools company Festool and of Canadian specialty foods manufacturer Skjodt-Barrett; manufacturing plants for Hendrickson International, DS Smith, Kuraray, Kauffman Engineering, Maplehurst Bakeries, and D-A Lubricant Company; distribution centers for CNH Parts & Services, Subaru of America, Continental Tire the Americas, and Hachette Book Group USA; and health care and medical facilities operated by Witham Health Services.

Lebanon is also the site of LEAP Research and Innovation District, an economic development initiative involving over 9,000 acres of land that will be allocated for technological and manufacturing projects. The area will be able to employ around 50,000 workers upon completion. Among the investments at LEAP is a $9 billion facility for Eli Lilly and Company that will produce active pharmaceutical ingredients for the antidiabetic medication Tirzepatide starting in late 2026.

== Transportation ==
Highways

- Interstate 65 to Gary (near Chicago) and Indianapolis
- US 52. A junction of U.S. Route 52 and Interstate 65 is located in the northwest part of Lebanon, and the two routes are concurrent through most of the city.
- State Road 32 to Crawfordsville and Muncie
- State Road 39 to LaPorte and Martinsville

Airports
The Boone County Airport is located 2 nautical miles (2.3 mi; 3.7 km) southeast of Lebanon's central business district. The nearest commercial airport which currently has scheduled airline service is Indianapolis International Airport (IND), located approximately 32 miles (51 km) south of Lebanon.

Railroads and Trails
CSX provides freight rail service in Lebanon. The Lebanon Business Park located in the southwest part of the city is designated a CSX Select Site; CSX constructed a rail spur directly into the business park.

The Lafayette and Indianapolis Railroad line traversing Lebanon was owned and operated by a number of companies from its inception in 1852 until it was abandoned in 1985. Portions of the former railroad line have been re-purposed as a shared use path currently known as Big 4 or Farm Heritage Trail. A trailhead is located at Sam Ralston Road east of Interstate 65 in Lebanon, and the trail extends 9.5 miles (15.3 km) from this point northwest to Thorntown.

== Sports ==
The Lebanon Leprechauns of The Basketball League (TBL) have played at The Farmers Bank Fieldhouse since 2022.

== Notable people ==
- Jacob M. Gile (1849–1937), architect in Colorado, born in Lebanon
- Doug Jones, MLB All-Star relief pitcher
- Mel Kenyon, Hall of Fame midget car driver; had four top-five finishes in Indianapolis 500
- Sylvia Likens, murder victim, born in Lebanon, murdered in Indianapolis in 1965 when she was 16
- Ray Long, editor of Cosmopolitan from 1919 to 1931, born in Lebanon
- Ami McKay, novelist, playwright and journalist
- Rick Mount, 1966 Indiana "Mr. Basketball" award recipient, 3x All-American Purdue player
- William Perigo, basketball head coach at Western Michigan University and University of Michigan
- Drew Powell, actor, is best known for his role as Hoss Cartwright on the TV series Ponderosa
- Allen Saunders, cartoonist and writer, Mary Worth
- G. Thomas Tanselle, textual critic, bibliographer, and book collector, especially known for his work on Herman Melville
- Craig Terrill, former Purdue and Seattle Seahawks football player
- Herman B Wells, former President of Indiana University, attended Lebanon High School
