= Paul Hutchens =

American author

Paul Hutchens (April 7, 1902, Thorntown, Indiana – January 23, 1977, Colorado Springs, Colorado) was an American author. In addition to writing The Sugar Creek Gang, a series of 36 Christian-themed juvenile fiction books about the adventures of a group of young boys, he also wrote numerous adult fiction books, many with a romance theme. The author was a graduate of Moody Bible Institute. The Sugar Creek Gang books have been popular in evangelical Christian homes and have remained in print through multiple format and cover art changes. The books have also been dramatized on the radio, and in 2004, the stories were made into a series of movies, directed by Joy Chapman and Owen Smith. His books were originally published by Wm. B. Eerdmans, and later reprinted by other publishers such as Van Kampen Press and Moody Press.

== Bibliography ==
- Romance of Fire (1934)
- This Way Out
- A Song Forever (1936)
- The Last First (1936)
- The Voice (1937)
- This Is Life
- Mastering Marcus (1938)
- Yesterday's Rain (1938)
- Shafted Sunlight
- Windblown (1942)
- Blaze Start
- The Vision (1942)
- Cup of Cold Water
- Eclipse
- When God Says No
- Morning Flight (1944)
- A Song Forever (1945)
- How to Meet Your Troubles
- Uninterrupted Sky (1949)
- Morning Light (1952)
- Cup of Cold Water (1952)
- The Mystery of the Marsh (1956)
- Yours for Four Years (1954)
- East of the Shadow
- My Life and I (autobiography) (1962)

== The Sugar Creek Gang series ==
- Adventures in an Indian Cemetery
- Battle of the Bees
- Blue Cow
- Brown Box Mystery
- Bull Fighter
- Cemetery Vandals
- Chicago Adventure
- Colorado Kidnapping
- Ghost Dog
- Green Tent Mystery
- Haunted House
- Indian Cemetery
- Killer Bear
- Killer Cat
- Locked in the Attic
- Lost Camper
- Lost in the Blizzard
- Mystery Cave
- Mystery Thief
- On the Mexican Border
- One Stormy Day
- Palm Tree Manhunt
- Runaway Rescue
- Screams in the Night
- Secret Hideout
- Swamp Robber
- Teacher Trouble
- The Indian Cemetery
- Thousand Dollar Fish
- Timber Wolf
- Trapline Thief
- Treasure Hunt
- Tree House Mystery
- Watermelon Mystery
- Western Adventure
- White Boat Rescue
- Winter Rescue

== Jeanie series ==
- It All Began With Jeanie
- The Trouble With Jeanie
- Terror On The Mountain
