= Sugar Creek Gang =

Series of Christian children's literature books

- Sugar Creek Gang: The Swamp Robber
- Author: Paul Hutchens
- Cover artist: Don Stewart
- Country: United States
- Language: English
- Genre: Children's literature
- Publisher: Moody Press
- Published: 1940
- Media type: Print

Sugar Creek Gang is a series of 36 Christian-themed children's literature books written by Paul Hutchens. The original series is set near Thorntown, Indiana, and named for the nearby Sugar Creek, based upon the formative years of Paul and his six brothers, and chronicles adventure situations told from a faith-based didactic perspective. The first book, The Sugar Creek Gang, was published in 1940; the final installment, The Brown Box Mystery, appeared in 1970. During the 1950s, Hutchens received oral and written feedback from his readers "that they practically grew up on Sugar Creek books as their main reading diet during juvenile days." In 2001, Pauline Hutchens Wilson took over her father's books with the release of The Case of the Red Hot Possum as the first book in "The New Sugar Creek Gang" series.

== Series description ==
According to Moody Publishing, the original series sold over three million print copies. The books are available in DVD, CD and audio versions. Radio dramatizations were produced by Northwestern College (now University of Northwestern) in St. Paul, Minnesota; these are broadcast daily as a segment of the afternoon Captain’s Club children's program on the Bible Broadcasting Network.

In 2004, the stories were made into a series of movies, directed by Joy Chapman and Owen Smith.

== The Gang ==
"The Sugar Creek Gang" consists of six boys, and later an additional member was introduced. All the characters are Christians. The group listing is:

Bill
Bill Collins is the narrator of the series. He has red hair and freckles, and is 10 years of age in the first book. Bill is one of two members of the gang to have no nickname. His best friend is Poetry, and he is a single child at first, but later has a little sister named Charlotte Ann. His father, Theodore Collins, is a farmer, but Bill wants to be a doctor when he grows up. He is a very good Christian.

Poetry (Leslie Thompson)
Poetry is sometimes called "the barrel-shaped member of the gang" because he is very chubby. He always boasts about his detective abilities, and usually has a tent pitched in his backyard. His nickname is "Poetry", because he has memorized so many poems that he can quote one for almost any situation.

Dragonfly (Roy Gilbert)
Dragonfly is the skinniest and most allergic member of the gang. He usually sees things that are not there at all, or are there before the rest of the gang does. He is nicknamed "Dragonfly" because dragonflies have big eyes. He is also superstitious, probably because his mother is.

Little Jim (Jim Reynolds)
Little Jim is the youngest member of the gang, and he carries around a walking stick that he carved to look like a candy cane. He is a very good Christian, and also an excellent piano player.

Circus (Daniel Brown)
Circus has a beautiful singing voice, and has five sisters! He is nicknamed "Circus" because he has amazing athletic abilities, and can't resist climbing a tree or doing a cartwheel. His dad used to drink and was not a Christian, but eventually became one and changed his ways early in the series.

Big Jim
Big Jim is the leader of the gang, and is several years older than the rest of the gang. He grew up in another town, where he was in the Boy Scouts. He uses the skills he learned as a Scout to lead the gang well.

Tom
Tom Till is the newest member of the gang and the second member (after Bill) to have no nickname. He also looks a lot like Bill (for example, he also has red hair). He has a mean brother named Bob, and also a very mean father (John Till), and a very sweet mother. He used to be in a mean gang of boys with his brother Bob, but later switched sides.

Bob
Bob Till is Tom's mean older brother. He is not a Christian but Tom and the gang put out quite an effort to reach him. He often causes trouble for the gang.

== New Sugar Creek Gang ==
"New Sugar Creek Gang" is a six-book series written by Pauline Hutchens Wilson, daughter of the original author, and Sandy Dengler. The "new gang" consists of five members: Bits, Tiny, Les, Lynn, and Mike.

== Original series bibliography ==
#	Title	Original title	First Published	Notes
1	The Swamp Robber	The Sugar Creek Gang	1940	
2	The Killer Bear	We Killed A Bear	1940	
3	The Winter Rescue	Further Adventures of the Sugar Creek Gang	1940	
4	The Lost Campers	The Sugar Creek Gang Goes Camping	1941	
5	The Chicago Adventure	The Sugar Creek Gang in Chicago	1941	
6	The Secret Hideout	The Sugar Creek Gang in School	1942	
7	The Mystery Cave	Mystery at Sugar Creek	1943	
8	Palm Tree Manhunt	The Sugar Creek Gang Flies to Cuba, On Palm Tree Island	1944	
9	One Stormy Day	One Stormy Day at Sugar Creek	1946	
10	The Mystery Thief	The New Sugar Creek Mystery	1946	
11	Teacher Trouble	Shenanigans at Sugar Creek	1947	
12	Screams in the Night	The Sugar Creek Gang Goes North	1947	
13	The Indian Cemetery	Adventure in an Indian Cemetery	1947	
14	The Treasure Hunt	The Sugar Creek Gang Digs for Treasure	1948	
15	Thousand Dollar Fish	North Woods Manhunt	1948	
16	The Haunted House	The Haunted House at Sugar Creek	1949	
17	Lost in the Blizzard	Lost in a Sugar Creek Blizzard	1950	
18	On the Mexican Border	The Sugar Creek Gang on the Mexican Border	1950	
19	The Green Tent Mystery	The Green Tent Mystery at Sugar Creek	1950	
20	The Bull Fighter	10,000 Minutes at Sugar Creek	1952	
21	The Trapline Thief	Trap Line Thief at Sugar Creek	1953	
22	The Blue Cow	Blue Cow at Sugar Creek	1953	
23	The Watermelon Mystery	Watermelon Mystery at Sugar Creek	1955	
24	The Tree House Mystery	Old Stranger's Secret at Sugar Creek	1957	
25	The Timber Wolf	The Sugar Creek Gang at Snow Goose Lodge	1957	
26	Western Adventure	Sugar Creek Gang Goes Western	1957	
27	The Killer Cat	We Killed a Wildcat at Sugar Creek	1958	
28	Locked in the Attic	Down a Sugar Creek Chimney	1959	
29	The Colorado Kidnapping	Wild Horse Canyon Mystery	1959	
30	The Runaway Rescue	Runaway Rescue at Sugar Creek	1960	
31	The Cemetery Vandals	The Worm Turns at Sugar Creek	1961	
32	The Battle of the Bees	Sleeping Beauty at Sugar Creek	1962	
33	The Case of the Missing Calf		1964	
34	The Ghost Dog	Howling Dog in the Sugar Creek Swamp	1968	
35	The White Boat Rescue	White Boat Rescue at Sugar Creek	1969	
36	The Brown Box Mystery		1970	
