= Traders Point Christian Church =

Church in Indiana, United States

Coordinates: 39.942219°N 86.358177°W

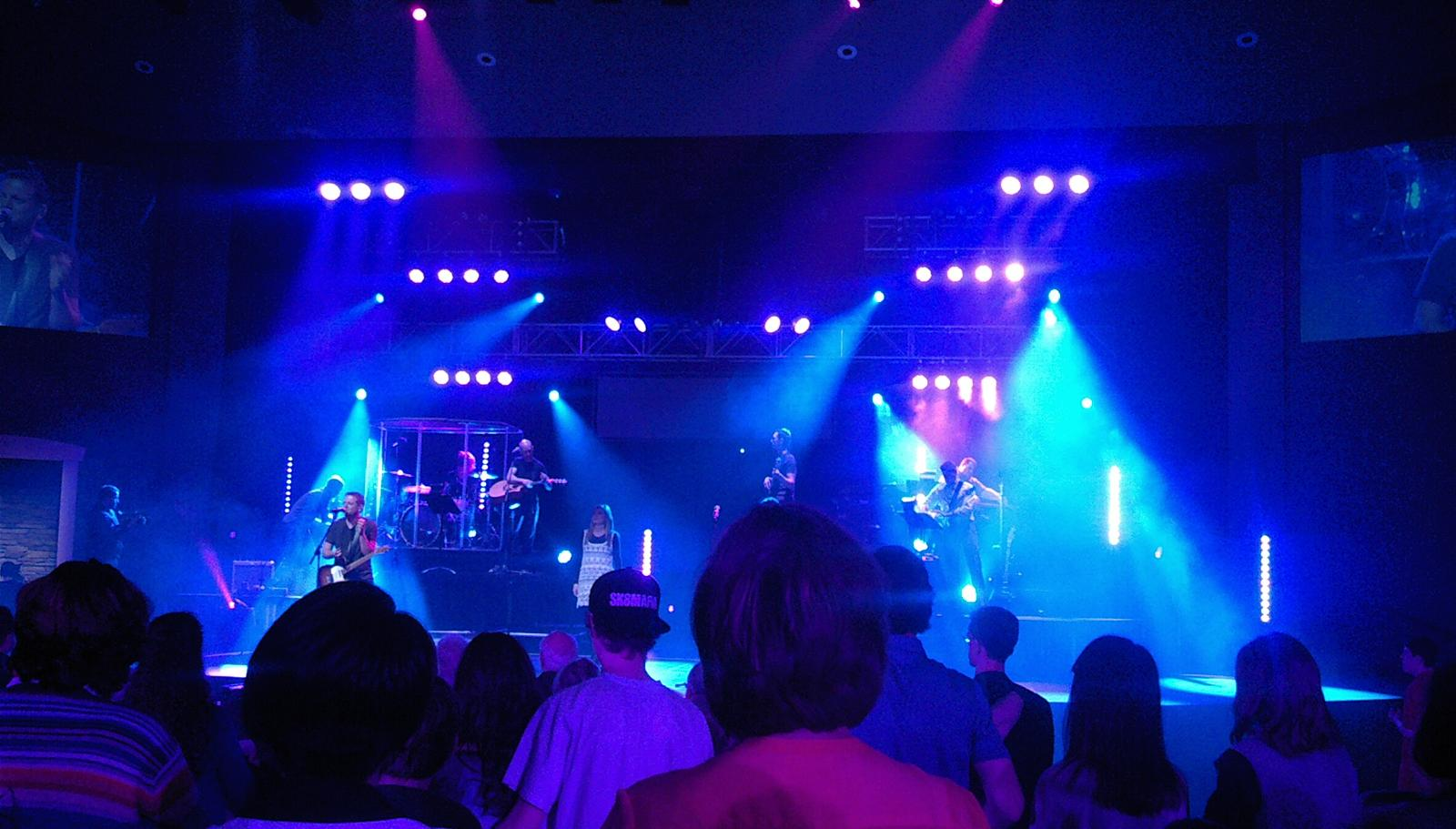
- An Easter service in 2013 at Traders Point.
- Classification: Nondenominational Christianity
- Scripture: The Bible
- Lead Pastor: Aaron Brockett
- Region: Indianapolis, Indiana
- Official website: www.tpcc.org

Traders Point Christian Church (TPCC) is a multi-site, nondenominational church with campuses in the Indianapolis, Indiana, greater metropolitan area. Traders Point has been cited as one of Outreach Magazine's "100 Fastest Growing Churches in America" for 2016 and has been led by Aaron Brockett since 2007.

== History ==
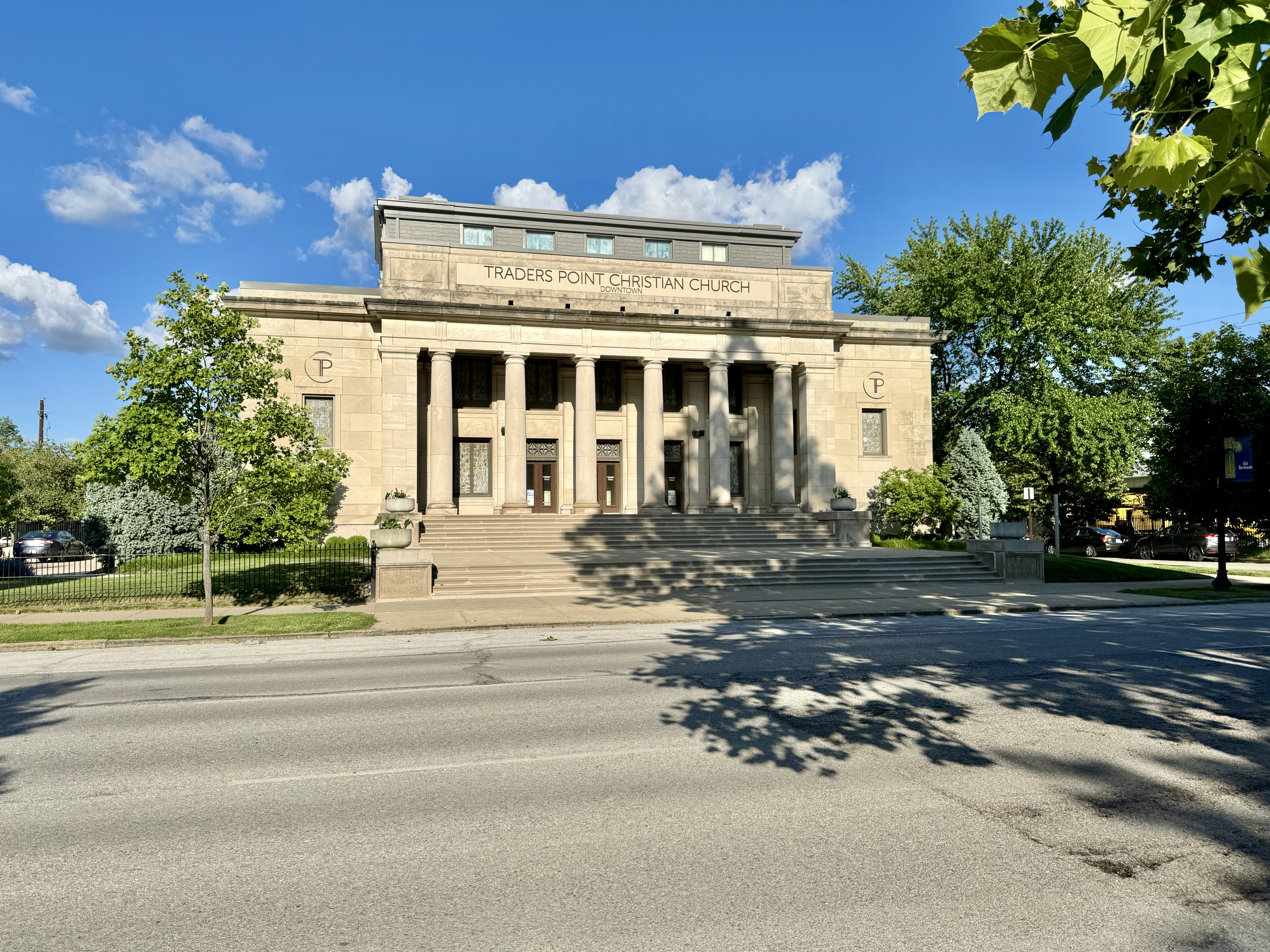
The Downtown Indianapolis campus of Traders Point Christian Church.

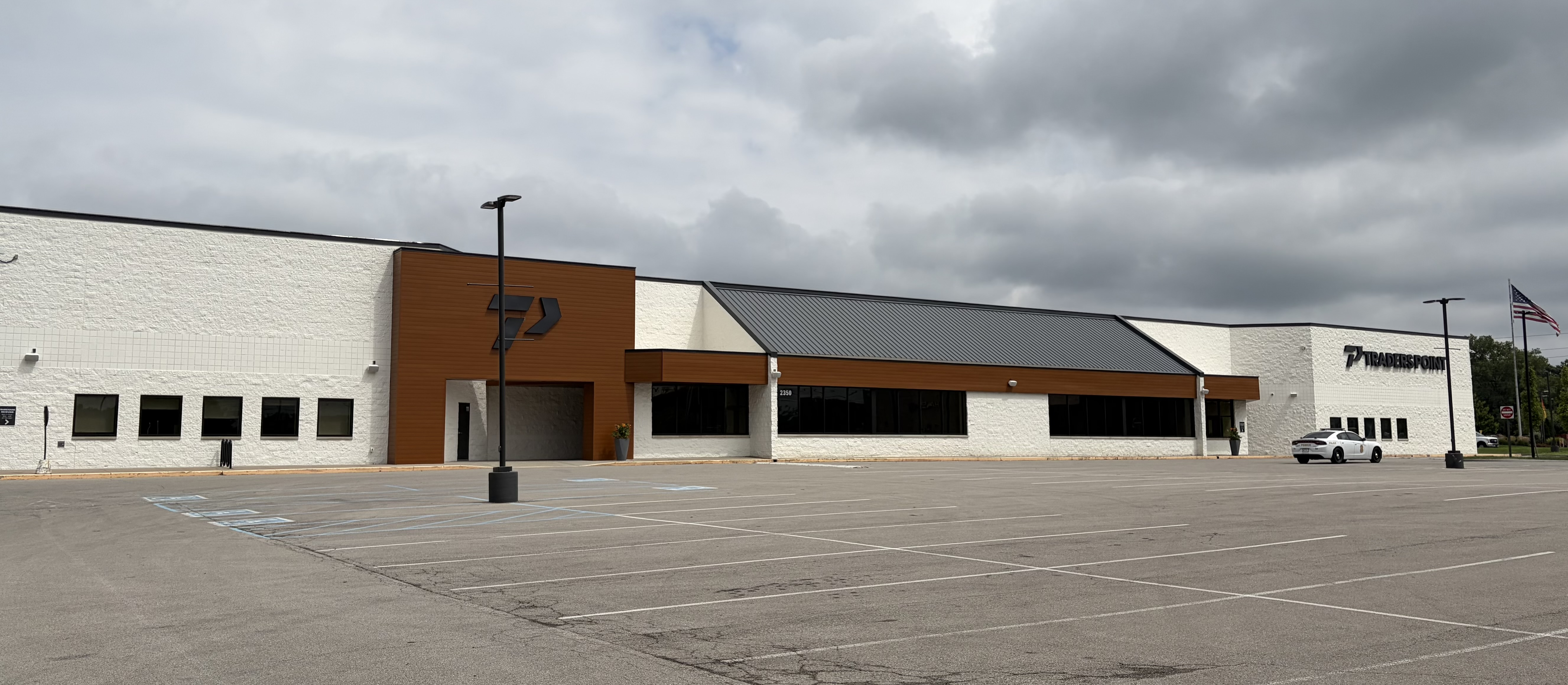
Traders Point Christian Church's Broad Ripple campus

Traders Point Christian Church began in 1834. In 2016, Traders Point became a multisite church after opening a second location in Carmel, Indiana. There are now six total locations, one each in Plainfield, Broad Ripple, Downtown Indianapolis, Fishers, Carmel and Whitestown.

Traders Point Christian Church streams services live every Sunday from the Whitestown campus. Each location has its own worship experience, video teaching, and campus pastor.
