= Whitestown, Indiana =

- Town
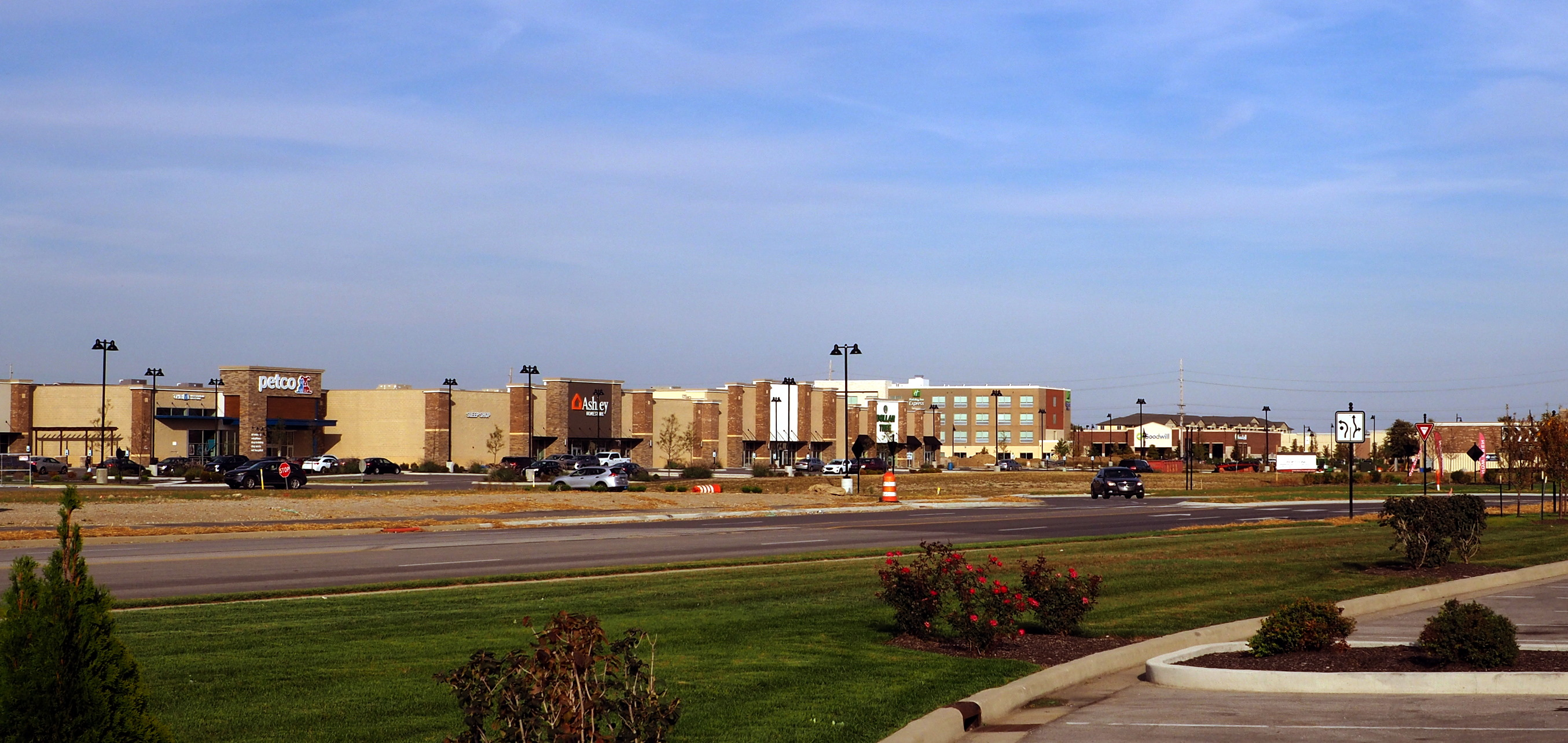
- Whitestown's Anson development in 2019

- Logo

- Location of Whitestown in Boone County, Indiana.
- Coordinates: 39°59′10″N 86°21′40″W
- Country: United States
- State: Indiana
- County: Boone
- Townships: Worth, Perry, Eagle
- Established: 1851
- Incorporated: 1947

Government
  - Town Council: Cheryl Hancock, Dan Patterson, Courtenay Smock, Tobe Thomas, Eric Nichols
  - Clerk-Treasurer: Matt Sumner
  - Town Manager: Katie Barr

Area
  - Total: 14.02 sq mi (36.32 km^{2})
  - Land: 14.02 sq mi (36.32 km^{2})
  - Water: 0 sq mi (0.00 km^{2})
- Elevation: 932 ft (284 m)

Population (2020)
  - Total: 10,178
  - Estimate (2025): 15,767
  - Density: 725.8/sq mi (280.23/km^{2})
- Time zone: UTC-5 (Eastern (EST))
  - Summer (DST): UTC-4 (EDT)
- ZIP code: 46075
- Area code: 317
- FIPS code: 18-84014
- GNIS feature ID: 2397741
- Website: whitestown.in.gov

Whitestown is a town in Boone County, Indiana, United States. The population was 10,187 at the 2020 census. The town is located near Interstate 65, approximately 22 miles (35 km) northwest of Downtown Indianapolis, and about 7 miles (11 km) from the northern city limits of Indianapolis, between exits 130 and 133. Since 2010, Whitestown has been the fastest-growing municipality in Indiana; its population increased more than threefold between the 2010 and 2020 Census tabulations.

== History ==
Whitestown was laid out in 1851 when the railroad was extended to that point. There is some difference of opinion on how the town derived its name. It was either named for Albert Smith White, a U.S. Senator from Indiana, or Lemuel White, the first white man that came to the community. The name of the town has at points been noted for being easily perceived as having historical ties to racism in Indiana, despite Albert S. White being known as a leading abolitionist. The first post office in Whitestown was established in 1853.

In 1947, Whitestown was officially incorporated as a town.

In the late 2000s, Whitestown annexed 6,500 acres (26 km^{2}) south of the historic downtown district. A master planned, mixed-use development named for U.S. Army officer and Boone County native Anson Mills was established in this area in 2005. The Great Recession adversely impacted the Anson project's original construction schedule, but residential, retail, and commercial growth gained momentum starting in 2011 and continues to this day. The Anson development now features a large selection of retail, including superstores and several fashion and lifestyle stores.

From 2010 until current day, Whitestown has been the fastest-growing municipality in Indiana, more than doubling in population between 2010 and 2017.

Whitestown is the home of the Little League Central Region headquarters. In 2021, a new complex opened, including the Central Region Headquarters administration building, a gift shop, and a Little League field with stadium seating, bleachers, a press box, and lights. The complex hosts both the Little League Softball Central Region and the Great Lakes and Midwest Region tournaments.

== Geography ==
According to the 2010 census, the town has a total area of 10.46 square miles (27.1 km^{2}), all land.

=== Climate ===
Climate data for Whitestown, Indiana (1991–2020)
Month	Jan	Feb	Mar	Apr	May	Jun	Jul	Aug	Sep	Oct	Nov	Dec	Year
Mean daily maximum °F (°C)	33.4 (0.8)	38.7 (3.7)	49.8 (9.9)	63.0 (17.2)	72.7 (22.6)	80.7 (27.1)	83.0 (28.3)	81.7 (27.6)	76.6 (24.8)	64.5 (18.1)	49.8 (9.9)	37.8 (3.2)	61.0 (16.1)
Daily mean °F (°C)	26.5 (−3.1)	30.8 (−0.7)	40.8 (4.9)	52.5 (11.4)	62.7 (17.1)	71.0 (21.7)	73.5 (23.1)	71.9 (22.2)	65.8 (18.8)	54.4 (12.4)	41.9 (5.5)	31.4 (−0.3)	51.9 (11.1)
Mean daily minimum °F (°C)	19.7 (−6.8)	22.9 (−5.1)	31.9 (−0.1)	42.1 (5.6)	52.8 (11.6)	61.3 (16.3)	64.0 (17.8)	62.1 (16.7)	55.0 (12.8)	44.4 (6.9)	34.0 (1.1)	25.0 (−3.9)	42.9 (6.1)
Average precipitation inches (mm)	2.86 (73)	2.47 (63)	3.16 (80)	4.30 (109)	4.56 (116)	4.67 (119)	3.83 (97)	2.85 (72)	3.29 (84)	2.97 (75)	3.43 (87)	2.88 (73)	41.27 (1,048)
Average snowfall inches (cm)	7.2 (18)	6.8 (17)	2.4 (6.1)	0.2 (0.51)	0.0 (0.0)	0.0 (0.0)	0.0 (0.0)	0.0 (0.0)	0.0 (0.0)	0.1 (0.25)	0.6 (1.5)	4.7 (12)	22 (55.36)
Source: NOAA

== Demographics ==
Historical population
Census	Pop.	Note	%±
1950	550		—
1960	613		11.5%
1970	569		−7.2%
1980	497		−12.7%
1990	476		−4.2%
2000	471		−1.1%
2010	2,867		508.7%
2020	10,178		255.0%
2025 (est.)	15,767		54.9%
U.S. Decennial Census

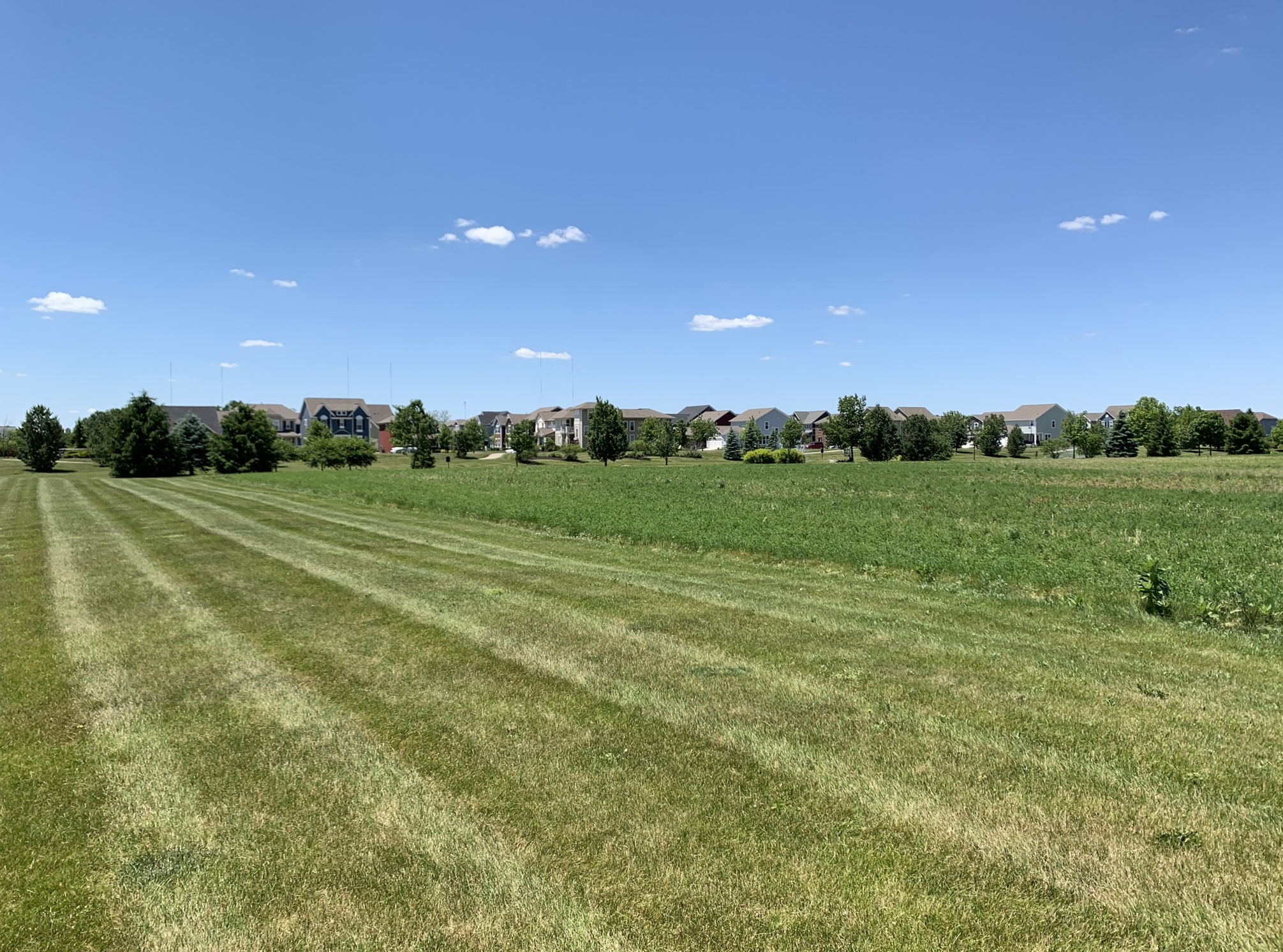
A field in Whitestown next to the Neighborhoods at Anson

=== 2020 census ===
As of the 2020 census, Whitestown had a population of 10,178. The median age was 32.2 years. 29.5% of residents were under the age of 18 and 6.6% of residents were 65 years of age or older. For every 100 females there were 97.1 males, and for every 100 females age 18 and over there were 93.8 males age 18 and over.

95.4% of residents lived in urban areas, while 4.6% lived in rural areas.

There were 3,787 households in Whitestown, of which 42.6% had children under the age of 18 living in them. Of all households, 59.8% were married-couple households, 13.3% were households with a male householder and no spouse or partner present, and 19.8% were households with a female householder and no spouse or partner present. About 21.9% of all households were made up of individuals and 4.1% had someone living alone who was 65 years of age or older.

There were 3,934 housing units, of which 3.7% were vacant. The homeowner vacancy rate was 0.4% and the rental vacancy rate was 6.7%.

Racial composition as of the 2020 census
Race	Number	Percent
White	7,736	76.0%
Black or African American	587	5.8%
American Indian and Alaska Native	18	0.2%
Asian	932	9.2%
Native Hawaiian and Other Pacific Islander	1	0.0%
Some other race	172	1.7%
Two or more races	732	7.2%
Hispanic or Latino (of any race)	527	5.2%

=== 2010 census ===
As of the census of 2010, there were 2,867 people, 1,053 households, and 774 families living in the town. The population density was 274.1 inhabitants per square mile (105.8/km^{2}). There were 1,144 housing units at an average density of 109.4 per square mile (42.2/km^{2}). The racial makeup of the town was 90.9% White, 2.8% African American, 0.1% Native American, 2.9% Asian, 1.1% from other races, and 2.2% from two or more races. Hispanic or Latino of any race were 3.5% of the population.

There were 1,053 households, of which 44.2% had children under the age of 18 living with them, 60.0% were married couples living together, 8.6% had a female householder with no husband present, 4.8% had a male householder with no wife present, and 26.5% were non-families. Of all households 18.5% were made up of individuals, and 3% had someone living alone who was 65 years of age or older. The average household size was 2.72 and the average family size was 3.14.

The median age in the town was 30 years. 30.6% of residents were under the age of 18; 5.7% were between the ages of 18 and 24; 42% were from 25 to 44; 17.5% were from 45 to 64; and 4.3% were 65 years of age or older. The gender makeup of the town was 50.5% male and 49.5% female.

=== 2000 census ===
In the census of 2000, there were 471 people, 175 households, and 131 families living in the town. The population density was 1,843.9 inhabitants per square mile (711.9/km^{2}). There were 187 housing units at an average density of 732.1 per square mile (282.7/km^{2}). The racial makeup of the town was 99.15% White, 0.21% Asian, and 0.64% from two or more races. Hispanic or Latino of any race were 0.64% of the population.

There were 175 households, out of which 40.6% had children under the age of 18 living with them, 61.7% were married couples living together, 8.0% had a female householder with no husband present, and 24.6% were non-families. Of all households 20.6% were made up of individuals, and 4.0% had someone living alone who was 65 years of age or older. The average household size was 2.69 and the average family size was 3.10.

In the town, the population was spread out, with 29.5% under the age of 18, 5.1% from 18 to 24, 37.4% from 25 to 44, 21.0% from 45 to 64, and 7.0% who were 65 years of age or older. The median age was 35 years. For every 100 females, there were 103.9 males. For every 100 females age 18 and over, there were 100.0 males.

The median income for a household in the town was $46,528, and the median income for a family was $47,917. Males had a median income of $32,031 versus $25,893 for females. The per capita income for the town was $21,674. About 8.1% of families and 7.3% of the population were below the poverty line, including 13.6% of those under age 18 and none of those age 65 or over.

== Parks and recreation ==
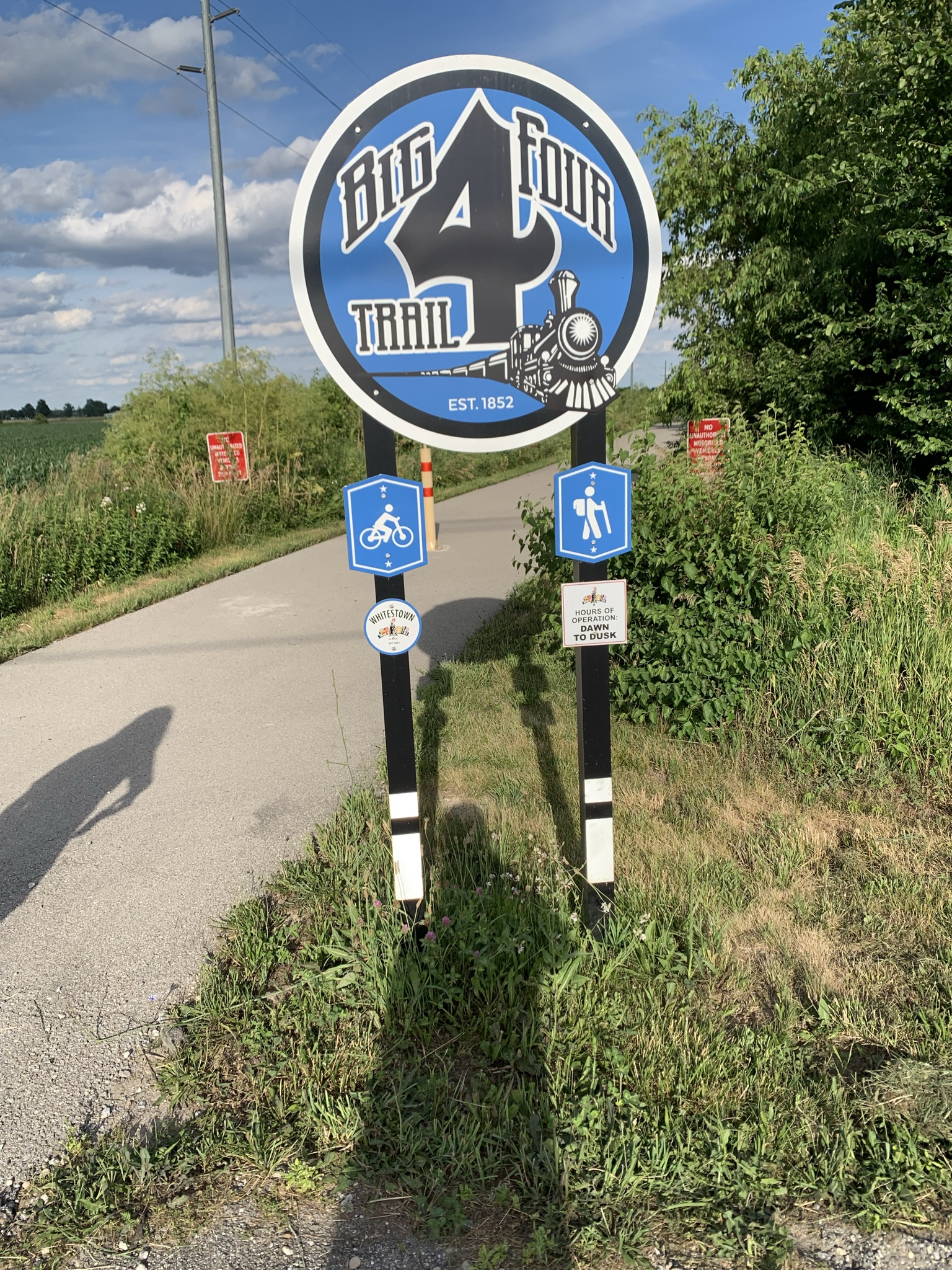
Trailhead marker for the Big 4 Trail in Whitestown

The Lafayette and Indianapolis Railroad line traversing Whitestown was owned and operated by a number of companies from its inception in 1852 until it was abandoned in 1976. In 2015, Whitestown began re-purposing portions of the former railroad line as a shared use path. It is known as the Big 4 Heritage Trail and travels intermittent portions of Boone County, including into nearby Lebanon and Zionsville. Whitestown's portion of the trail covers 2.4 miles (3.9 km). In April 2022, Whitestown received 1.1 million dollars to complete its portion of the Big 4 Trail, adding 0.75 miles (1.21 km) miles to the southern segment and 0.9 miles (1.4 km) to the northern segment. The project was completed in October 2023.

== Education ==
Public school students in Whitestown are served by two systems: those in Worth Township and Perry Township attend schools operated by Lebanon Community School Corporation, while those in Eagle Township attend Zionsville Community Schools. The Lebanon district's comprehensive high school is Lebanon Senior High School. The Zionsville district's comprehensive high school is Zionsville Community High School.

Traders Point Christian School, a private K-12 school operated as a ministry of Traders Point Christian Church, is also located in Whitestown.

Hussey-Mayfield Memorial Public Library - Whitestown Branch opened in 2024.

== Infrastructure ==
=== Transportation ===
==== Transit ====
The Central Indiana Regional Transportation Authority operates a commuter bus serving major employers in the town.

==== Highways ====
- Interstate 65
- US 52 - concurrent with Interstate 65
- State Road 267
