= New Augusta Historic District =

Historic district in Indiana, United States

- U.S. National Register of Historic Places
- U.S. Historic district
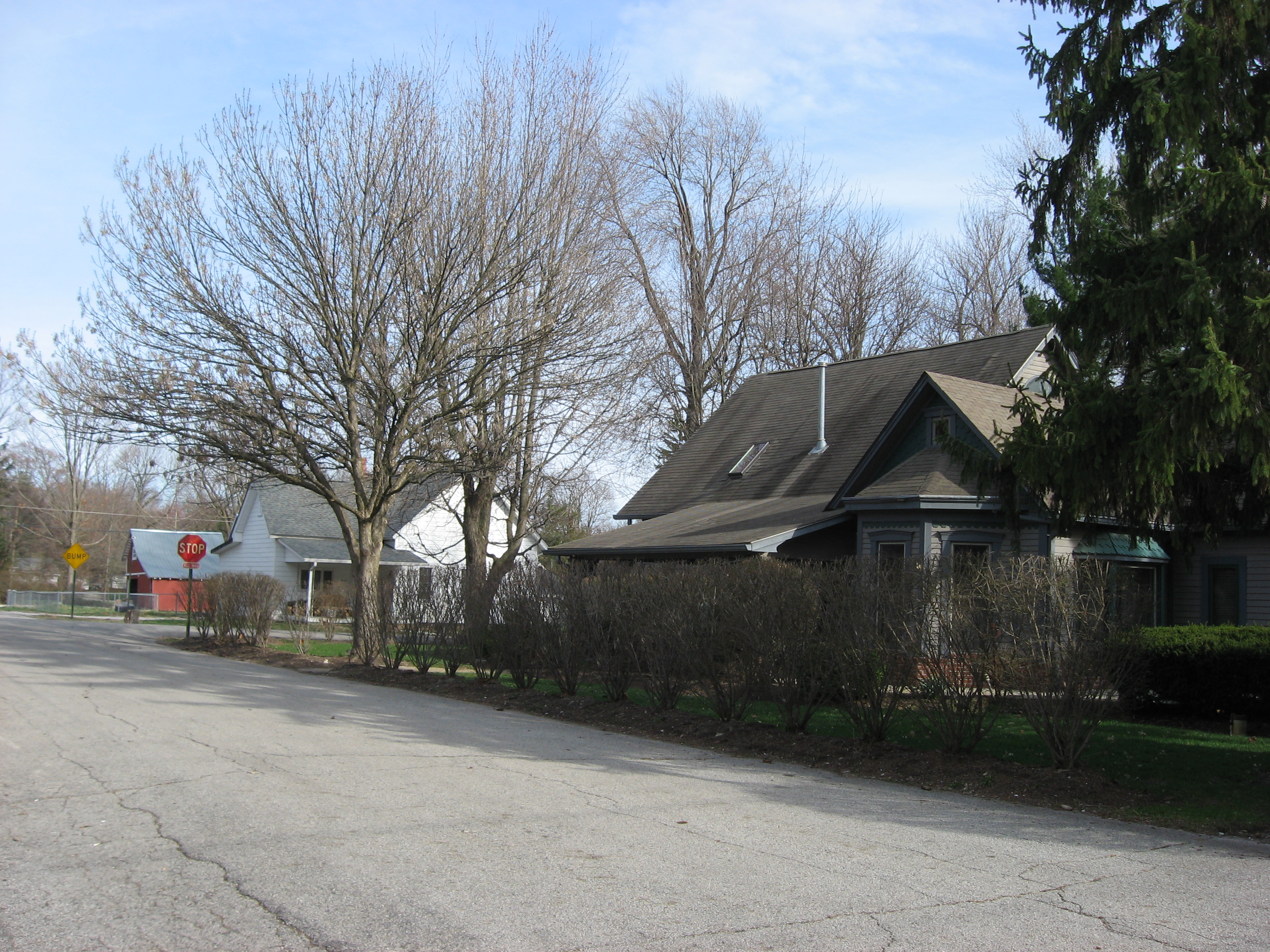
- Houses in New Augusta, March 2011

- Location within Indiana Location within the United States
- Location: Roughly E. 71st St., E. 74th St., Coffman Rd., New Augusta Rd., Indianapolis, Indiana
- Coordinates: 39°53′02″N 86°14′09″W
- Area: 46 acres (19 ha)
- Architect: Enos, E.Y. & Co.
- Architectural style: Bungalow/craftsman, Italianate, Gabled ell
- NRHP reference No.: 89000780
- Added to NRHP: July 12, 1989

New Augusta Historic District is a national historic district located at Indianapolis, Indiana. It encompasses 114 contributing buildings, 1 contributing structure, and 1 contributing object in a railroad oriented village in Indianapolis. The district developed between about 1852 and 1939, and includes representative examples of Italianate and Bungalow / American Craftsman style architecture. Notable contributing buildings include the Odd Fellows Building (c. 1890), Hopewell Evangelical Lutheran Church (c. 1859, c. 1880), Salem Lutheran Church (1880), and New Augusta Depot (c. 1890). It is located west of Augusta.

It was listed on the National Register of Historic Places in 1989.

Painter Florence Smithburn was a native of New Augusta.

== See also ==
- National Register of Historic Places listings in Marion County, Indiana
