= Augusta, Indianapolis =

Neighborhood in Indianapolia, Indiana, US

Augusta, Indianapolis, Indiana
- Neighborhood
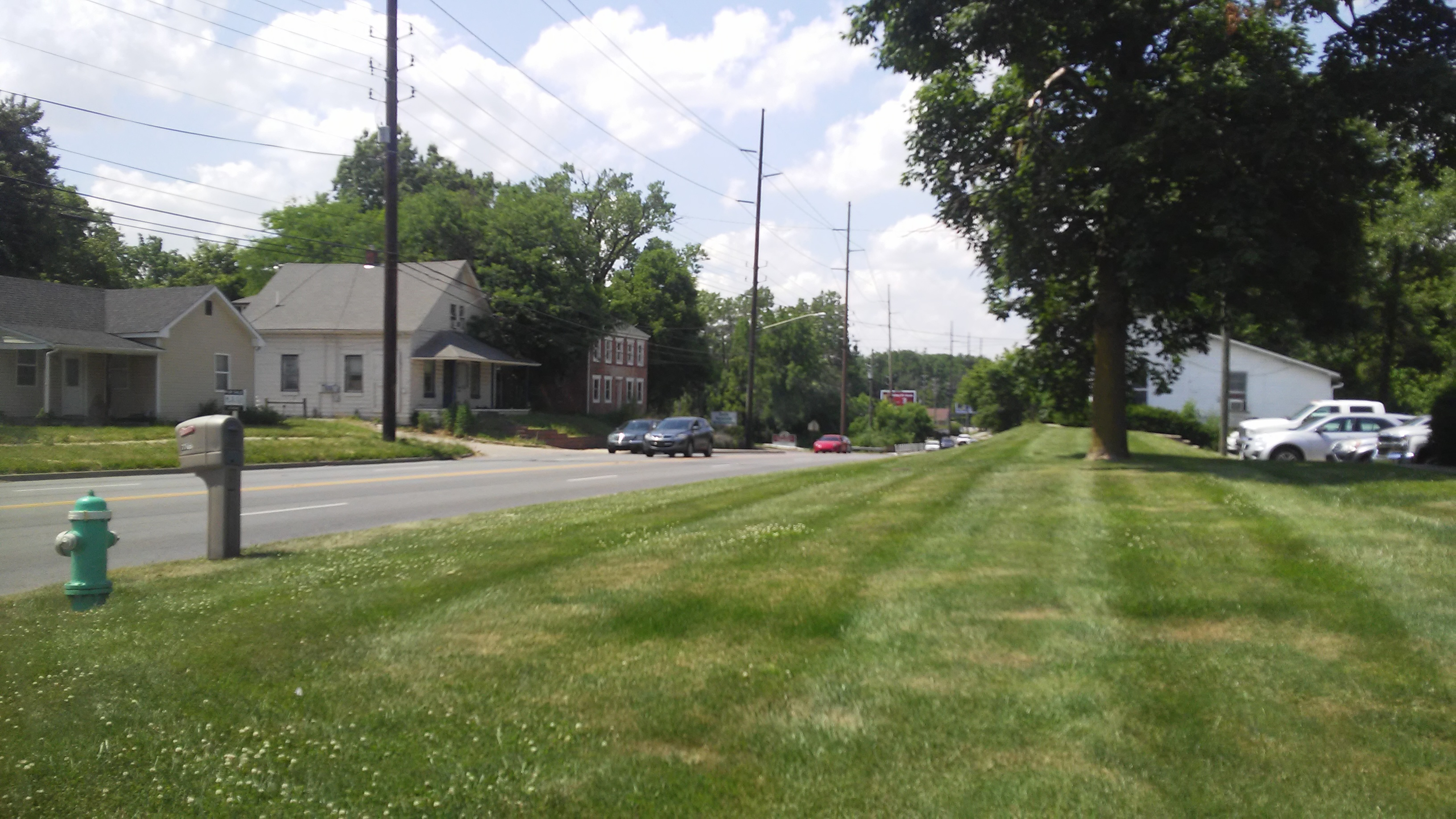

- Location within Indiana Location within the United States
- Coordinates: 39.890°N 86.212°W
- Country: United States
- State: Indiana
- County: Marion
- Township: Pike
- Time zone: Eastern (EST)
- ZIP code: 46268
- Area codes: 317 & 463

Augusta is a neighborhood in Pike Township, Marion County, in the U.S. state of Indiana. It was formerly a small village that later had a post office and general stores.

== History ==
Augusta was settled when the Michigan Road was completed. It became a thriving community with a general store and other commercial buildings. In 1852, the Indianapolis & Lafayette Railroad was constructed parallel to and about 1.5 miles (2.4 km) west of Michigan Road and the settlement. Eventually much of the Augusta business community moved to be near the railroad station in what is now New Augusta.

== Geography ==
Augusta is located just south of Crooked Creek at the intersection of 76th St. and Michigan Rd. in Indianapolis.

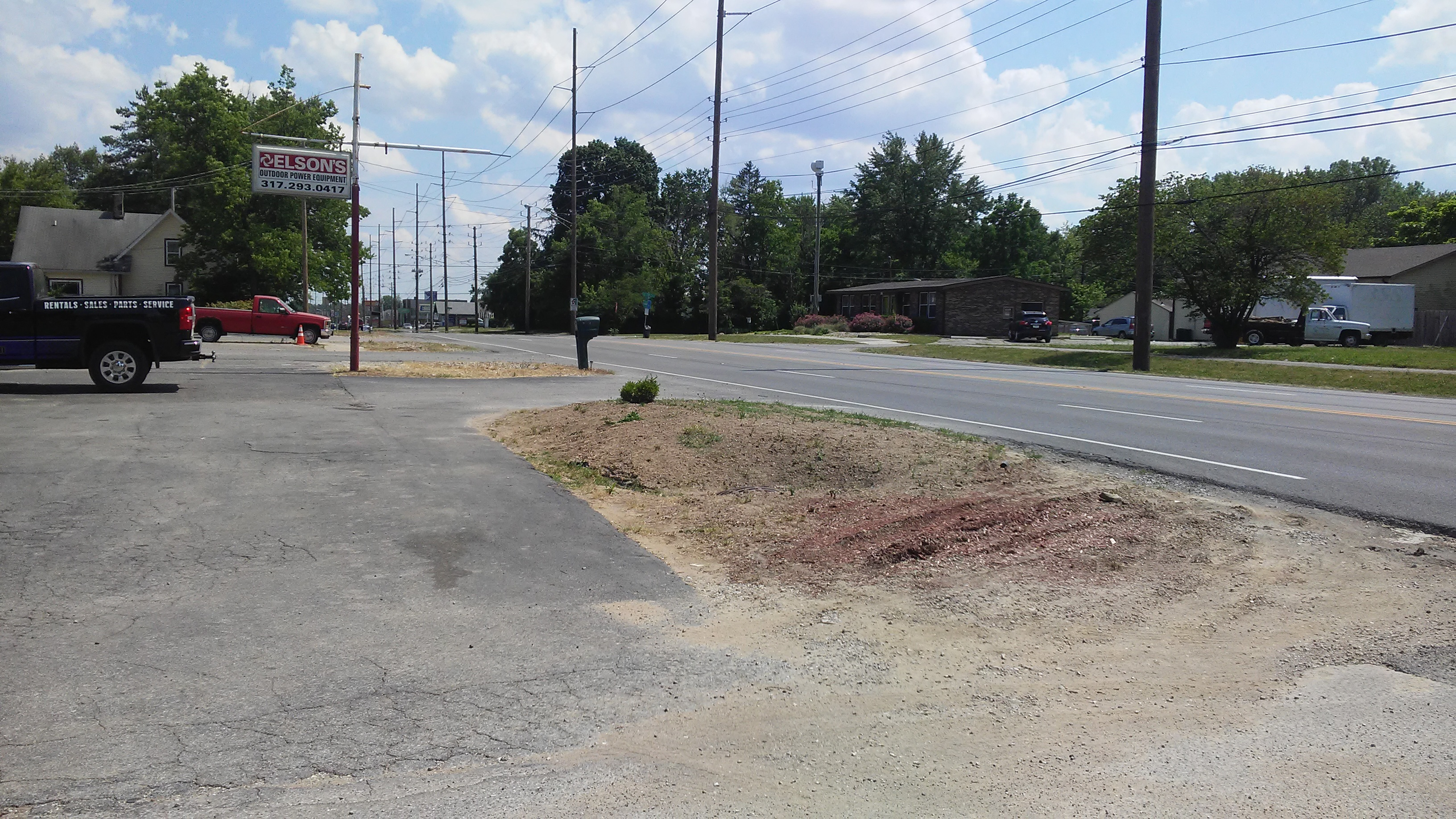
Intersection of 76th St. and Michigan Rd. in Augusta

== See also ==
- List of neighborhoods in Indianapolis
- New Augusta Historic District
