= Strange Nathanial Cragun House =

Historic house in Indiana, United States

- U.S. National Register of Historic Places
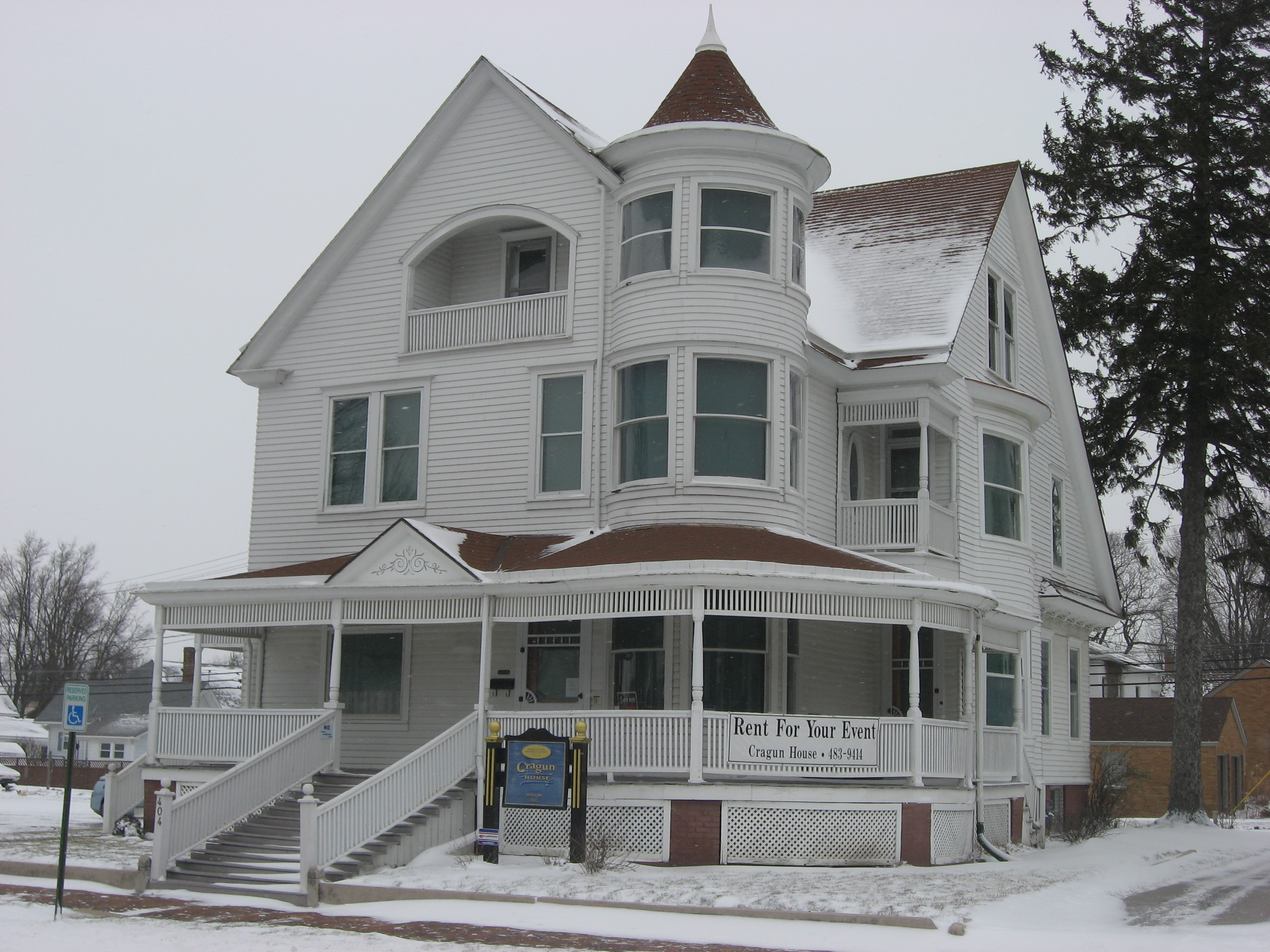
- Strange Nathanial Cragun House, January 2012

- Location within Boone County, Indiana Location within Indiana Location within the United States
- Location: 404 W. Main St., Lebanon, Indiana
- Coordinates: 40°02′52″N 86°28′18″W
- Area: less than 1 acre (0.40 ha)
- Built: 1893
- Architect: Skinner, G.A.
- Architectural style: Queen Anne
- NRHP reference No.: 11000908
- Added to NRHP: December 15, 2011

Strange Nathanial Cragun House is a historic home located at Lebanon, Indiana. It was built in 1893, and is a 2 1/2-story, Queen Anne style, "T"-gabled frame dwelling. It features a round corner tower and wraparound porch. It has housed the Boone County Historical Society since 1988.

It was listed on the National Register of Historic Places in 2011.
