= Thorntown Public Library =

Library in Indiana, USA

- U.S. National Register of Historic Places
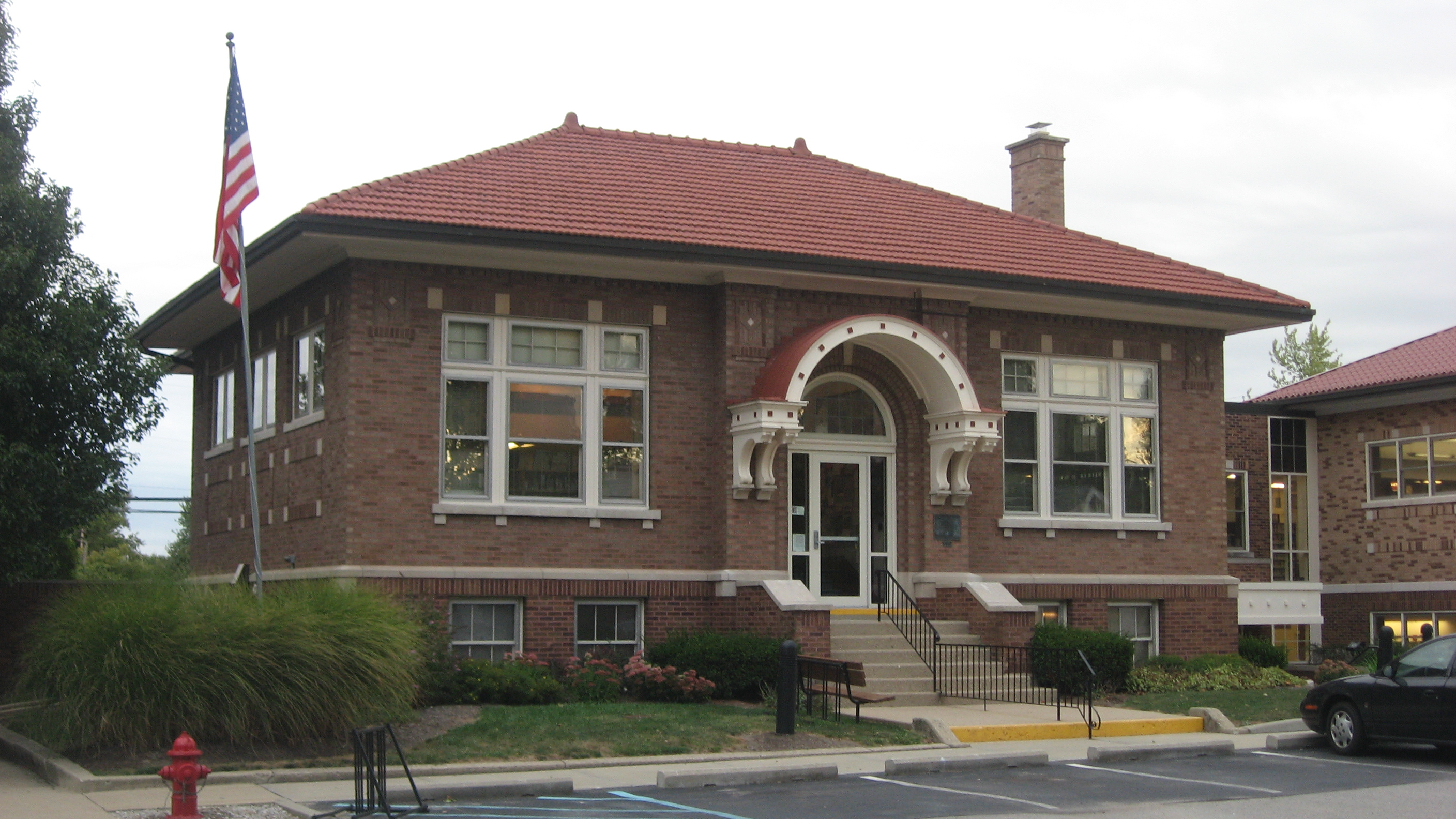
- Thorntown Public Library, September 2011

- Location within Boone County, Indiana Location within Indiana Location within the United States
- Location: 124 N. Market St., Thorntown, Indiana
- Coordinates: 40°7′50″N 86°36′22″W
- Area: less than one acre
- Built: 1914-1915
- Architect: Parker, Wilson B.
- NRHP reference No.: 86002708
- Added to NRHP: September 22, 1986

Thorntown Public Library is a historic Carnegie library located at Thorntown, Indiana. It was built in 1914–1915, and is a one-story, three-bay, brown brick building with a red clay tile hipped roof. It has a round arched entrance and limestone trim. Its construction was funded with $10,000 from the Carnegie Corporation of New York.

It was listed on the National Register of Historic Places in 1986.

The Thorntown Public Library today is one of the three public libraries in Boone County.
