= Maplelawn Farmstead =

- U.S. National Register of Historic Places
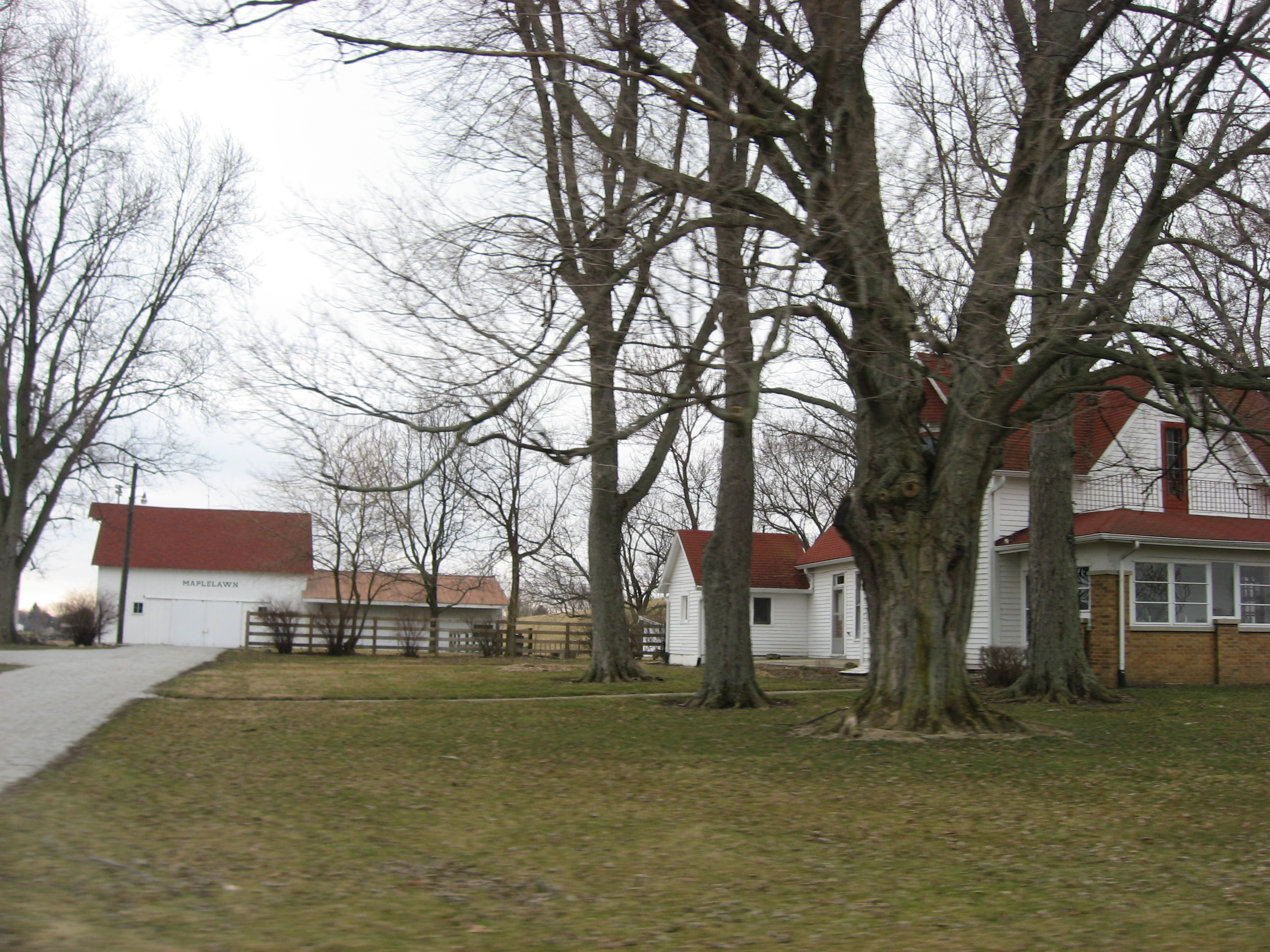
- Maplelawn Farmstead, March 2011

- Location within Boone County, Indiana Location within Indiana Location within the United States
- Location: 9575 Whitestown Rd., near Zionsville, Eagle Township, Boone County, Indiana
- Coordinates: 39°57′53″N 86°17′15″W
- Area: 4 acres (1.6 ha)
- Built: c. 1860, c. 1900-1925
- Built by: Multiple
- Architectural style: Gothic Revival, Queen Anne, Bungalow / craftsman
- MPS: Eagle Township and Pike Township, Indiana MPS
- NRHP reference No.: 11000656
- Added to NRHP: September 15, 2011

Maplelawn Farmstead is a historic home and farm located at Eagle Township, Boone County, Indiana. The farmhouse was built about 1860, with several later additions. It is a two-story, frame I-house sheathed in clapboard. It has Gothic Revival, Queen Anne and American Craftsman style design elements. It features a full-width, one-story enclosed front porch. Also on the property are the contributing large Maplelawn English barn (c. 1900–1925), dairy barn (c. 1900–1925), corn crib, summer kitchen, two chicken coops, goose house, two hog houses, privy, small dog house, and garage.

It was listed on the National Register of Historic Places in 2011.
