= Worth Township, Boone County, Indiana =

Worth Township
- Township
- Location of Worth Township in Boone County
- Coordinates: 39°59′55″N 86°21′24″W
- Country: United States
- State: Indiana
- County: Boone

Government
  - Type: Indiana township

Area
  - Total: 19.09 sq mi (49.4 km^{2})
  - Land: 19.09 sq mi (49.4 km^{2})
  - Water: 0 sq mi (0 km^{2})
- Elevation: 945 ft (288 m)

Population (2020)
  - Total: 4,464
  - Density: 128.5/sq mi (49.6/km^{2})
- FIPS code: 18-85580
- GNIS feature ID: 454064
- Website: worthtownship.org

Worth Township is one of twelve townships in Boone County, Indiana. As of the 2010 census, its population was 2,454 and it contained 1,020 housing units.

== Geography ==
According to the 2010 census, the township has a total area of 19.09 square miles (49.4 km^{2}), all land.

=== Cities and towns ===
- Whitestown

=== Adjacent townships ===
- Center (northwest)
- Eagle (southeast)
- Perry (southwest)
- Union (northeast)

=== Major highways ===
- Interstate 65
- Indiana State Road 32
