= Boone County Airport (Indiana) =

- IATA: none; ICAO: none; FAA LID: 6I4

Summary
- Airport type: Public
- Owner: Bill Dugan / Eugene Henderson
- Serves: Lebanon, Indiana
- Elevation AMSL: 959 ft (292 m)
- Coordinates: 40°00′26″N 086°26′26″W

Map
- Location of airport in Indiana/United States 6I4 (the United States)

Runways
Direction	Length		Surface
Direction	ft	m	Surface
18/36	3,600	1,097	Concrete

Statistics
- Aircraft operations (2013): 4,426
- Based aircraft (2016): 37
- Source: Federal Aviation Administration

Boone County Airport (FAA LID: 6I4) is a privately owned, public use airport located two nautical miles (2.3 mi; 3.7 km) southeast of the central business district of Lebanon, a city in Boone County, Indiana, United States.

== Facilities and aircraft ==
Boone County Airport covers an area of 39 acres (16 ha) at an elevation of 959 feet (292 m) above mean sea level. It has one runway designated 18/36 with a concrete surface measuring 3,600 by 30 feet (1,097.3 by 9.1 m).

For the 12-month period ending December 31, 2013, the airport had 4,426 general aviation aircraft operations, an average of 12 per day. In November 2016, there were 37 aircraft based at this airport: 34 single-engine, 2 multi-engine and 1 ultralight.

== See also ==
- Boone County Airport (Arkansas) and Boone County Airport (Kentucky)
- List of airports in Indiana
