= Boone County Courthouse (Indiana) =

- U.S. National Register of Historic Places
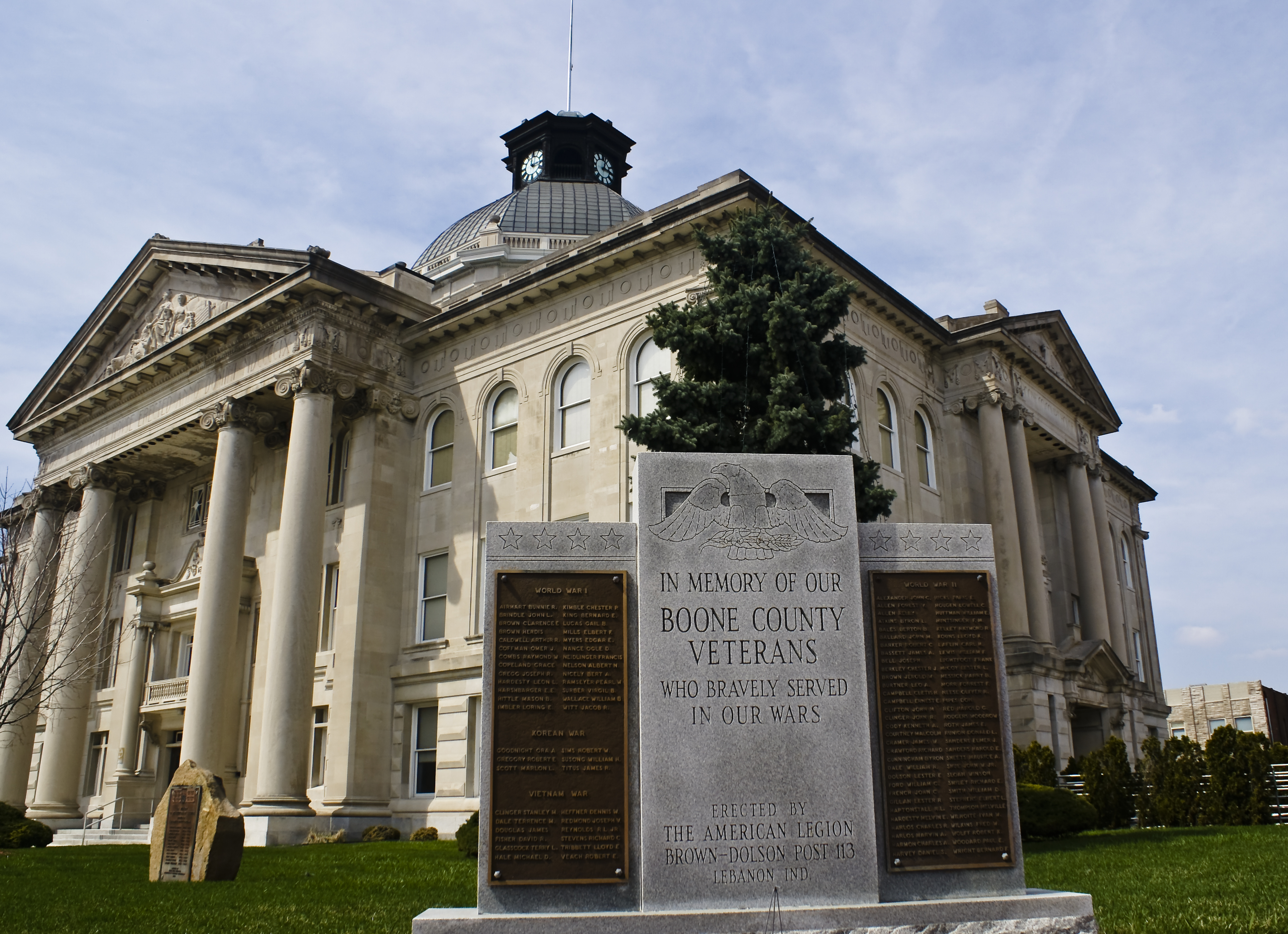
- Boone County Courthouse, April 2008

- Location within Boone County, Indiana Location within Indiana Location within the United States
- Location: Courthouse Sq., Lebanon, Indiana
- Coordinates: 40°2′52″N 86°28′7″W
- Area: less than one acre
- Built: 1909-1911
- Architect: Hutton, J.T.
- Architectural style: Classical Revival
- NRHP reference No.: 86002703
- Added to NRHP: September 22, 1986

Boone County Courthouse is a historic courthouse located at Lebanon, Indiana, United States. It was built between 1909 and 1911, and is a three-story, rectangular Classical Revival building constructed of granite and Bedford limestone. It features an art glass dome surmounted by a clock tower and pedimented porticoes supported by four Ionic order columns. The columns, measuring 35 feet 3 inches (10.74 m) tall, were at the time at their construction among the tallest solid columns in the U.S.

It was listed on the National Register of Historic Places in 1986.
