= Eagle Village, Indiana =

- Unincorporated community
- Boone County's location in Indiana

- Location in Boone County
- Coordinates: 39°57′38″N 86°14′44″W
- Country: United States
- State: Indiana
- County: Boone
- Township: Eagle
- Elevation: 896 ft (273 m)
- Time zone: UTC-5 (Eastern (EST))
  - Summer (DST): UTC-4 (EDT)
- ZIP code: 46077
- GNIS feature ID: 433855

Eagle Village is an unincorporated community in Eagle Township, Boone County, in the U.S. state of Indiana.

== History ==
William Miller, an early settler of the area, hired George L. Kinnard, the Marion County surveyor, to lay out a town that would be named Eagle Village. It was named from Eagle Township. The original town plat consisted of 18 blocks of 108 lots, including a post office that was established on December 15, 1832, and remained in operation until it was discontinued in 1858. The town's first postmaster was William Miller. In 1836 William Miller sold his farm and the remaining unsold lots in Eagle Village to Daniel Larimore, who added seven lots extending southward on the west side of the Michigan Road.

== Geography ==
Eagle Village is located at 39°57′38″N 86°14′44″W.
