= Traders Point Hunt Rural Historic District =

Historic district in Indiana, United States

- U.S. National Register of Historic Places
- U.S. Historic district
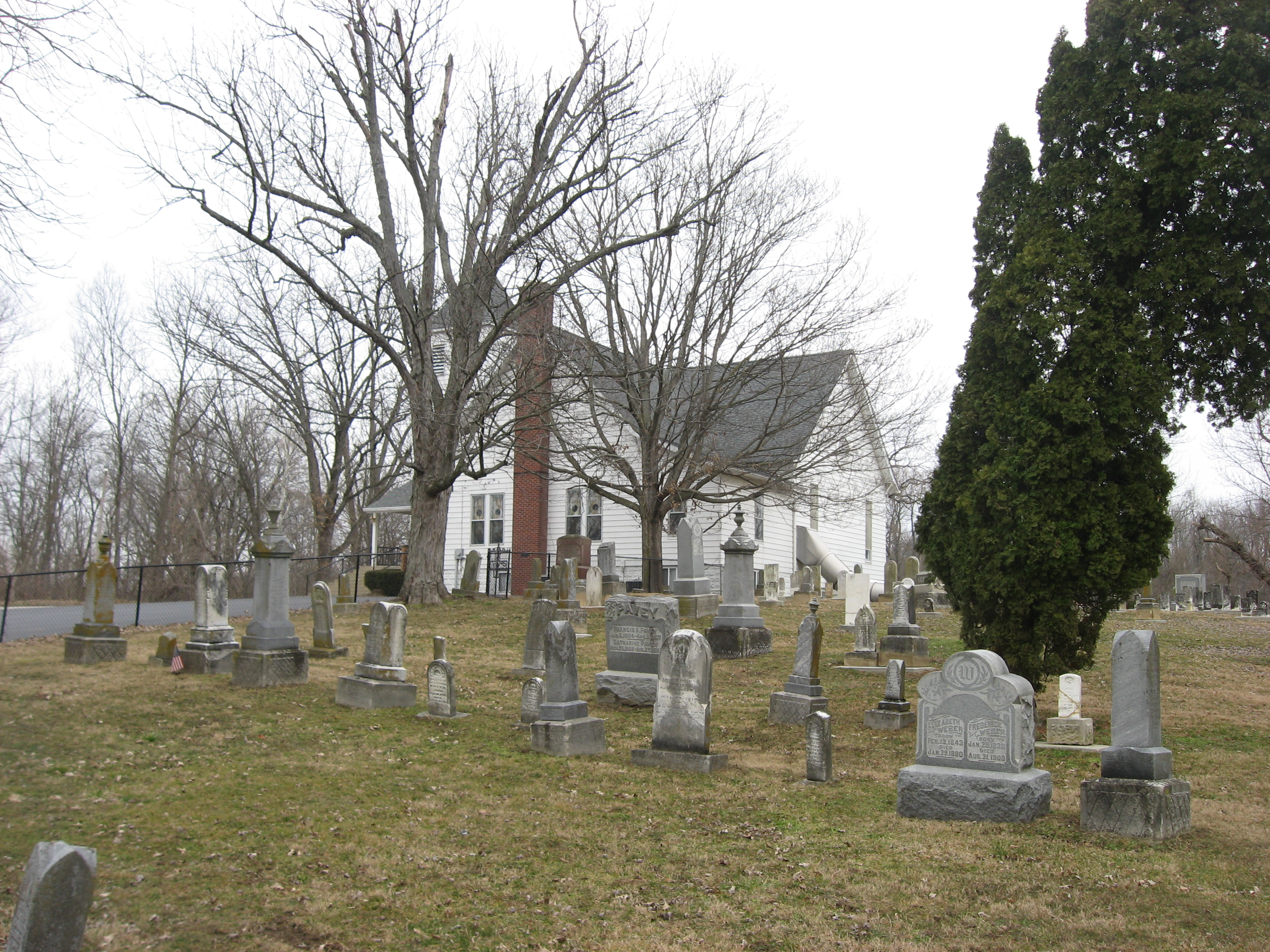
- Salem United Methodist Church and cemetery, Traders Point Hunt Rural Historic District, March 2011

- Location within Boone County, Indiana Location within Indiana Location within the United States
- Location: Roughly bounded by State Road 334, Interstate 865, Old Hunt Club Rd., and County Road 850E, southwest of Zionsville, Eagle Township, Boone County, Indiana
- Coordinates: 39°56′25″N 86°19′17″W
- Area: 709 acres (287 ha)
- Architectural style: Greek Revival, Ranch
- MPS: Eagle Township and Pike Township, Indiana MPS
- NRHP reference No.: 09000421
- Added to NRHP: June 17, 2009

Traders Point Hunt Rural Historic District is a national historic district located at Eagle Township, Boone County, Indiana. The district encompasses 34 contributing buildings, 18 contributing sites, and 7 contributing structures in a rural area near Zionsville. The district is characterized by the agricultural landscape, farmsteads and estates, recreational landscapes, transportation features including roads and bridges, and historic cemeteries.

It was listed on the National Register of Historic Places in 2009.
