= Oak Hill Cemetery (Lebanon, Indiana) =

- U.S. National Register of Historic Places
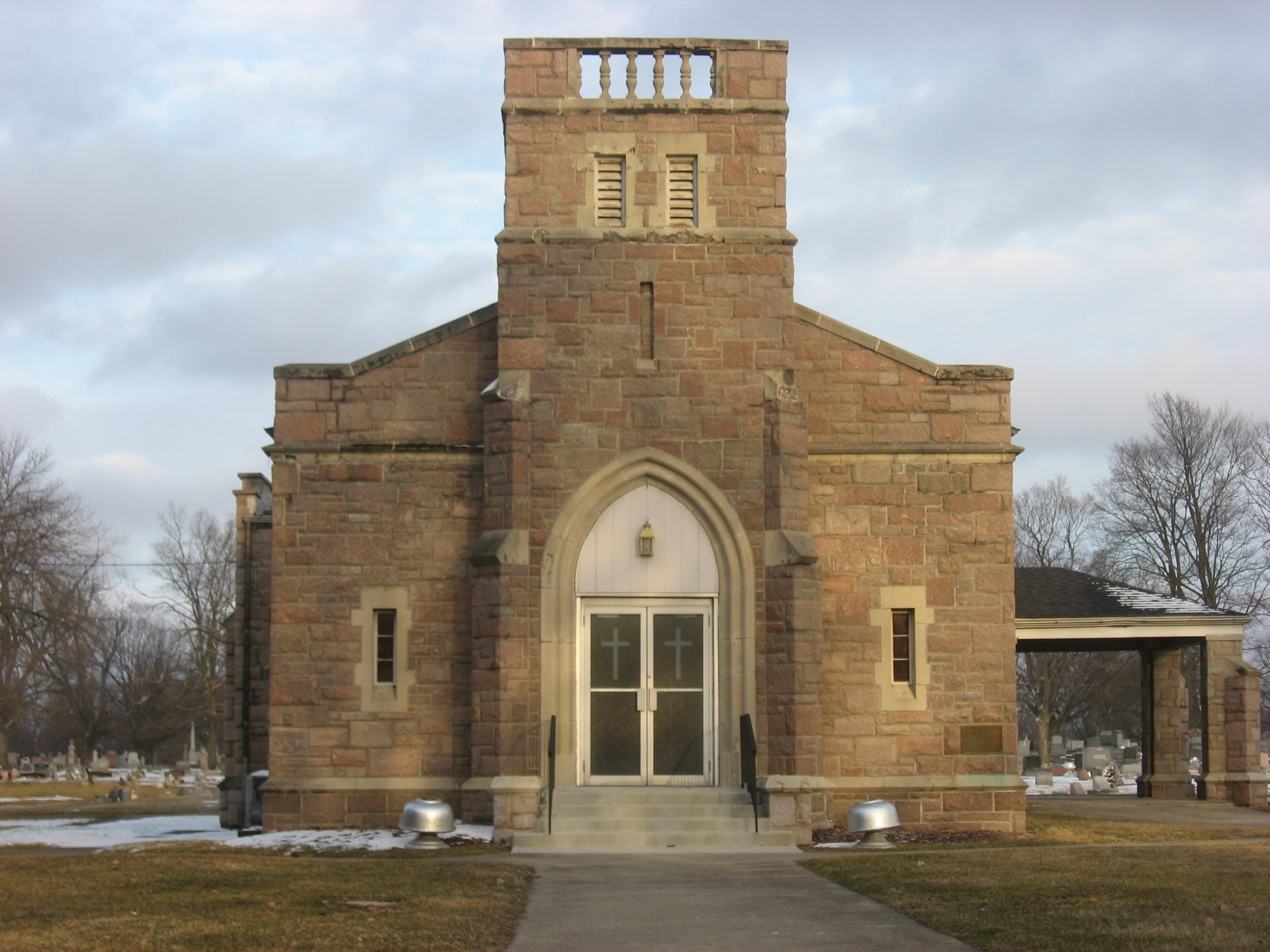
- William L. Powell Chapel, March 2014

- Location within Boone County, Indiana Location within Indiana Location within the United States
- Location: 935 E. Washington St., Lebanon, Indiana
- Coordinates: 40°02′50″N 86°27′16″W
- Area: 36 acres (15 ha)
- Built: 1872, c. 1925
- Architect: Pfeiffer, R.J.
- Architectural style: Gothic Revival, Romanesque Revival
- NRHP reference No.: 14000068
- Added to NRHP: March 26, 2014

Oak Hill Cemetery is a historic cemetery located at Lebanon, Indiana. The cemetery was established in 1872 as Rodefer Cemetery, and includes many noteworthy examples of Victorian funerary art. Other notable features are the Late Gothic style William L. Powell Chapel (1930), office building (1955), English barn, the Romanesque Revival style main gate, north gate, the original mausoleum, Metzger Mausoleum, Heath Mausoleum, and Stokes Mausoleum. Notable burials include Indiana governor and U.S. Senator Samuel M. Ralston (1857–1925).

It was listed on the National Register of Historic Places in 2014.

== Notable burials ==
Noteworthy burials at the cemetery include:

- Thomas Jefferson Cason (1828–1901), US Congressman
- Sylvia Likens (1949–1965), torture-murder victim
- Samuel M. Ralston (1857–1925), Indiana governor and U.S. Senator
