= Richard Lahey =

American painter

- Born: June 23, 1893; Jersey City, New Jersey, US
- Died: August 1, 1978 (aged 85); Fairfax, Virginia, US
- Occupation: Painter

Richard Lahey (June 23, 1893 – August 1, 1978) was an American painter. His work was part of the painting event in the art competition at the 1932 Summer Olympics.
