= Pryor Brock Farmstead =

- Brock, Pryor Farmstead
- U.S. National Register of Historic Places
- U.S. Historic district
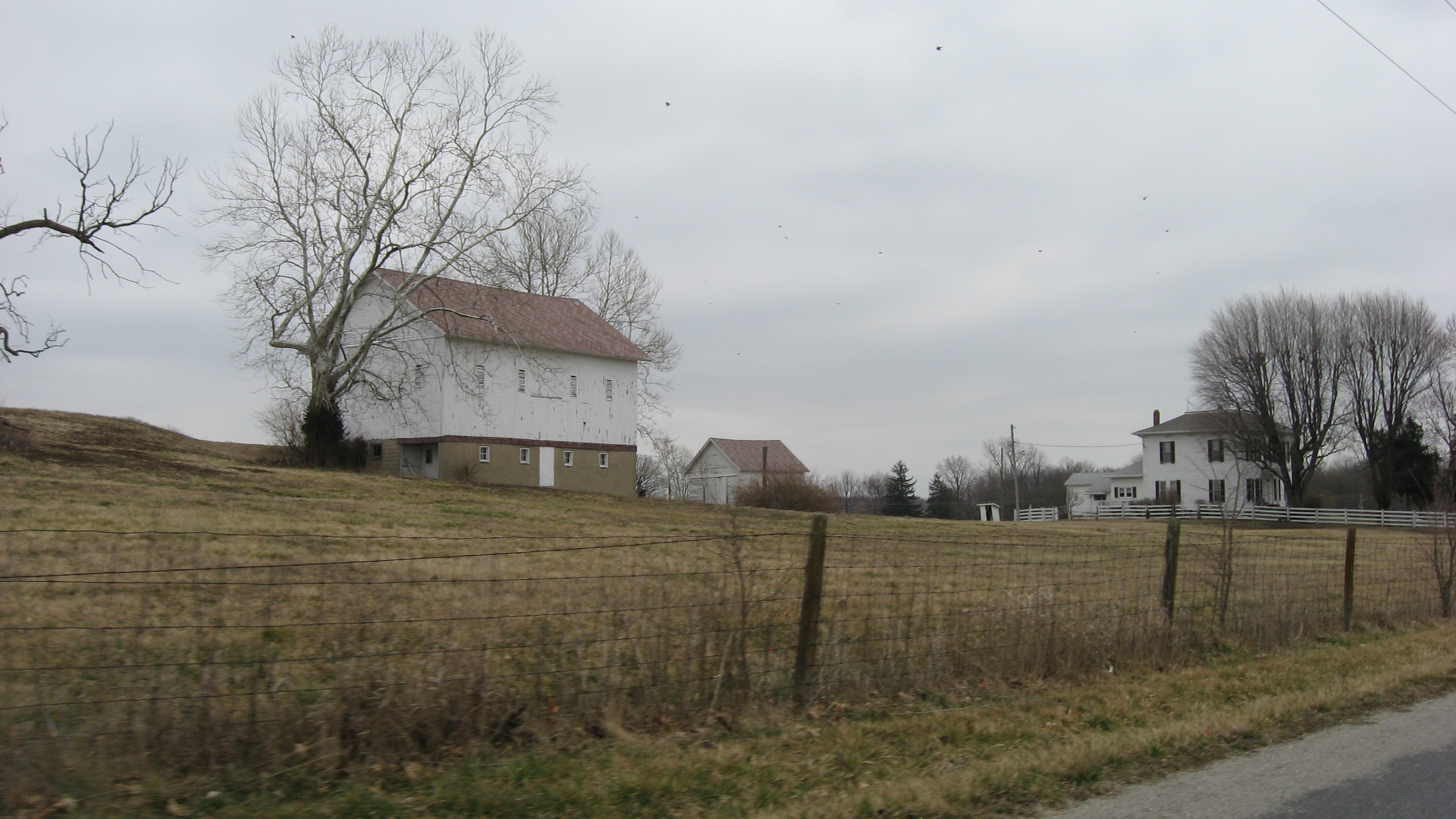
- Buildings on the farmstead

- Location within Boone County, Indiana Location within Indiana Location within the United States
- Location: 8602 E500S, Zionsville, Indiana
- Coordinates: 39°58′13″N 86°18′22″W
- Area: 4.9 acres (2.0 ha)
- Architectural style: Italianate
- MPS: Eagle Township and Pike Township, Indiana MPS
- NRHP reference No.: 08000569
- Added to NRHP: June 27, 2008

The Pryor Brock Farmstead is a place on the National Register of Historic Places just west of Zionsville, Indiana, comprising 4.9 acres (20,000 m^{2}) of what was once a 200-acre (0.81 km^{2}) farm. It was placed on the Register, June 27, 2008, due to its role in the agricultural history of Eagle Township, Boone County, Indiana. Pryor Brock Farmstead, with its carpenter's rendering of Italianate architecture, is the best representation of the prosperous agricultural setting around Zionsville/Eagle Township during its time of significance (1870–1920), the "golden age" of Hoosier agriculture.

The farm was built by Pryor and Emeline Brock. Pryor was born on January 31, 1823, in Tennessee, and moved to Putnam County, Indiana in 1829 when his father Allen Brock chose to relocate; the family removed to Boone County in 1832. Pryor married Emeline Stoneking in 1846. It was in 1878 that the Brocks built the house, after some of their older children had already moved out. By 1880 the value of the land was $10,000 when the county average was $1,180. Emeline died in 1884, with Pryor eventually marrying an Emma Lemon when he was 68 years old. Pryor would be 75 years old when he died on October 3, 1898. The farmstead continued in the Brock family until 2006, when Rosemary Brock Rudwolis died, with a codicil stating the structures on the property should be maintained and preserved.

The wood-framed main house is a Late Victorian-Italianate structure, with a stone foundation, wood/clapboard walls, and an asphalt roof. Although well made, the Brock's purposely avoided "urban showiness". The farmland is one of the few elevated areas of an otherwise flat, featureless countryside. Partially covered boulders which came to the area as glacial erratics flank the entrance to the property.
