= Thorntown, Indiana =

Thorntown, Indiana Akaawiahkionki (Miami-Illinois)
- Town
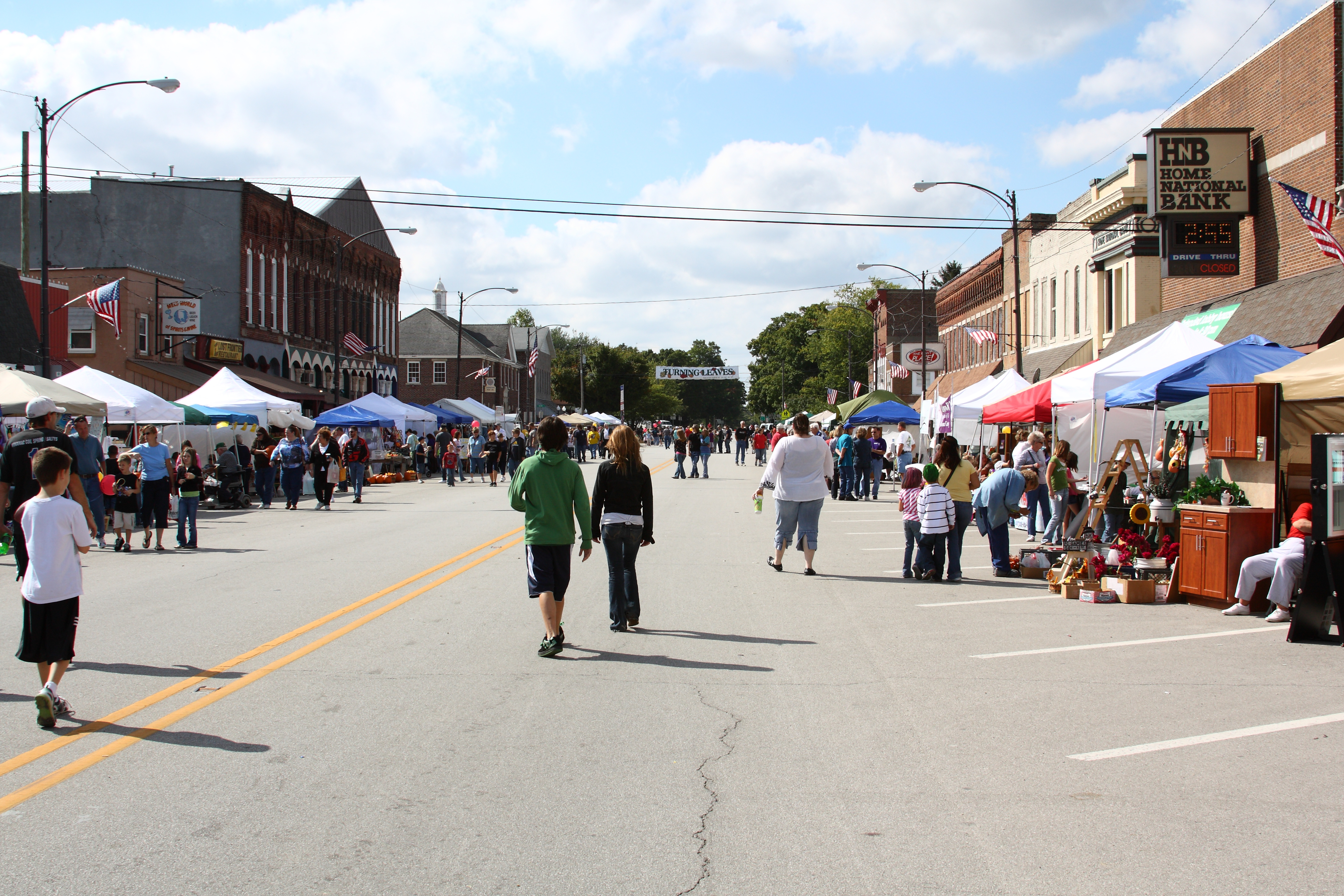
- Main Street during the Festival of the Turning Leaves
- Nickname: Kawiakiungi
- Location of Thorntown in Boone County, Indiana.
- Coordinates: 40°07′36″N 86°36′33″W
- Country: United States
- State: Indiana
- County: Boone
- Township: Sugar Creek
- Settled: 1827
- Platted: April 10, 1830
- Founder: Cornelius Westfall

Area
  - Total: 0.61 sq mi (1.59 km^{2})
  - Land: 0.61 sq mi (1.59 km^{2})
  - Water: 0 sq mi (0.00 km^{2})
- Elevation: 856 ft (261 m)

Population (2020)
  - Total: 1,432
  - Density: 2,335.7/sq mi (901.82/km^{2})
- Time zone: UTC-5 (Eastern (EST))
  - Summer (DST): UTC-4 (EDT)
- ZIP code: 46071
- Area code: 765
- FIPS code: 18-75626
- GNIS feature ID: 2397695
- Website: townofthorntown.com

Thorntown is a town in Sugar Creek Township, Boone County, Indiana. The population was 1,432 at the time of the 2020 census. Thorntown is located in northwestern Boone County, about halfway between Lafayette and Indianapolis.

== History ==
Thorntown is the English translation of Akaawiahkionki, (Note: Sometimes anglicized as Kawiakiungi) the name of a former Eel River Miami village located there. The first European settlement at Thorntown was made in 1827 when a man named George Harness established a trading post in the area. Thorntown was officially founded by Cornelius Westfall, who platted the town on April 10, 1830. A post office was established at Thorntown the same year.

The Thorntown Public Library was listed on the National Register of Historic Places in 1986.

== Geography ==
According to the 2010 census, Thorntown has a total area of 0.6 square miles (1.55 km^{2}), all land.

== Demographics ==
Historical population
Census	Pop.	Note	%±
1860	1,016		—
1870	1,526		50.2%
1880	1,515		−0.7%
1890	1,530		1.0%
1900	1,511		−1.2%
1910	1,508		−0.2%
1920	1,432		−5.0%
1930	1,325		−7.5%
1940	1,226		−7.5%
1950	1,380		12.6%
1960	1,486		7.7%
1970	1,399		−5.9%
1980	1,468		4.9%
1990	1,506		2.6%
2000	1,562		3.7%
2010	1,520		−2.7%
2020	1,432		−5.8%
U.S. Decennial Census

=== 2020 census ===
As of the 2020 census, Thorntown had a population of 1,432. The median age was 40.8 years. 23.4% of residents were under the age of 18 and 18.6% of residents were 65 years of age or older. For every 100 females there were 94.3 males, and for every 100 females age 18 and over there were 91.1 males age 18 and over.

0.0% of residents lived in urban areas, while 100.0% lived in rural areas.

There were 572 households in Thorntown, of which 33.4% had children under the age of 18 living in them. Of all households, 49.8% were married-couple households, 15.4% were households with a male householder and no spouse or partner present, and 26.4% were households with a female householder and no spouse or partner present. About 23.6% of all households were made up of individuals and 11.7% had someone living alone who was 65 years of age or older.

There were 617 housing units, of which 7.3% were vacant. The homeowner vacancy rate was 3.5% and the rental vacancy rate was 2.5%.

Racial composition as of the 2020 census
Race	Number	Percent
White	1,361	95.0%
Black or African American	1	0.1%
American Indian and Alaska Native	0	0.0%
Asian	0	0.0%
Native Hawaiian and Other Pacific Islander	0	0.0%
Some other race	10	0.7%
Two or more races	60	4.2%
Hispanic or Latino (of any race)	23	1.6%

=== 2010 census ===
As of the census of 2010, there were 1,520 people, 556 households, and 422 families living in the town. The population density was 2,533.3 inhabitants per square mile (978.1/km^{2}). There were 622 housing units at an average density of 1,036.7 per square mile (400.3/km^{2}). The racial makeup of the town was 99.1% White, 0.1% African American, 0.2% Native American, 0.1% from other races, and 0.5% from two or more races. Hispanic or Latino of any race were 0.7% of the population.

There were 556 households, of which 37.1% had children under the age of 18 living with them, 51.4% were married couples living together, 16.9% had a female householder with no husband present, 7.6% had a male householder with no wife present, and 24.1% were non-families. 20.7% of all households were made up of individuals, and 11.7% had someone living alone who was 65 years of age or older. The average household size was 2.73 and the average family size was 3.10.

The median age in the town was 37.5 years. 26% of residents were under the age of 18; 10.7% were between the ages of 18 and 24; 22.6% were from 25 to 44; 27.8% were from 45 to 64; and 13% were 65 years of age or older. The gender makeup of the town was 47.8% male and 52.2% female.

=== 2000 census ===
As of the census of 2000, there were 1,562 people, 589 households, and 444 families living in the town. The population density was 2,736.1 inhabitants per square mile (1,056.4/km^{2}). There were 632 housing units at an average density of 1,107.1 per square mile (427.5/km^{2}). The racial makeup of the town was 97.57% White, 0.13% Asian, 1.47% from other races, and 0.83% from two or more races. Hispanic or Latino of any race were 1.98% of the population.

There were 589 households, out of which 37.4% had children under the age of 18 living with them, 59.9% were married couples living together, 11.0% had a female householder with no husband present, and 24.6% were non-families. 22.2% of all households were made up of individuals, and 10.4% had someone living alone who was 65 years of age or older. The average household size was 2.65 and the average family size was 3.07.

In the town, the population was spread out, with 29.3% under the age of 18, 7.2% from 18 to 24, 29.4% from 25 to 44, 21.0% from 45 to 64, and 13.0% who were 65 years of age or older. The median age was 36 years. For every 100 females, there were 95.0 males. For every 100 females age 18 and over, there were 87.8 males.

The median income for a household in the town was $38,289, and the median income for a family was $43,194. Males had a median income of $33,750 versus $24,524 for females. The per capita income for the town was $19,109. About 5.4% of families and 6.6% of the population were below the poverty line, including 6.4% of those under age 18 and 10.7% of those age 65 or over.

== Government ==
The town is governed by a Town Board who oversees all sewage, electric, and police and fire service. The town board is also in charge of capital improvements and special projects such as road construction, signage, ordinance adoption, and administrating over the town court. There are five members of the board and a president is chosen from among them.

The town's fire service is provided by Thorntown-Sugar Creek Twp. Fire and ambulance service is provided by Witham Health Services.

The town's police department consists of four full-time police officers and anywhere between six and nine reserve officers. The town's police department falls under the Indiana town marshal system. The town uses three police vehicles and provides almost 24-hour service. The town's marshals are also in charge of collecting loose or stray animals as well as enforcing local ordinance and state laws. The officers have full police authority within anywhere in the state of Indiana as prescribed by law.

== Education ==
It is in the Western Boone County Community School Corporation.

== Notable people ==
- William La Follette, member of the United States House of Representatives, was born in Thorntown.
- Paul Hutchens, author known for the Sugar Creek Gang book series
- Anson Mills, general and founder of El Paso, Texas
- William W. Rogers, major general in Marine Corps during World War II
