= Pike Township, Marion County, Indiana =

Pike Township Marion County
- Township
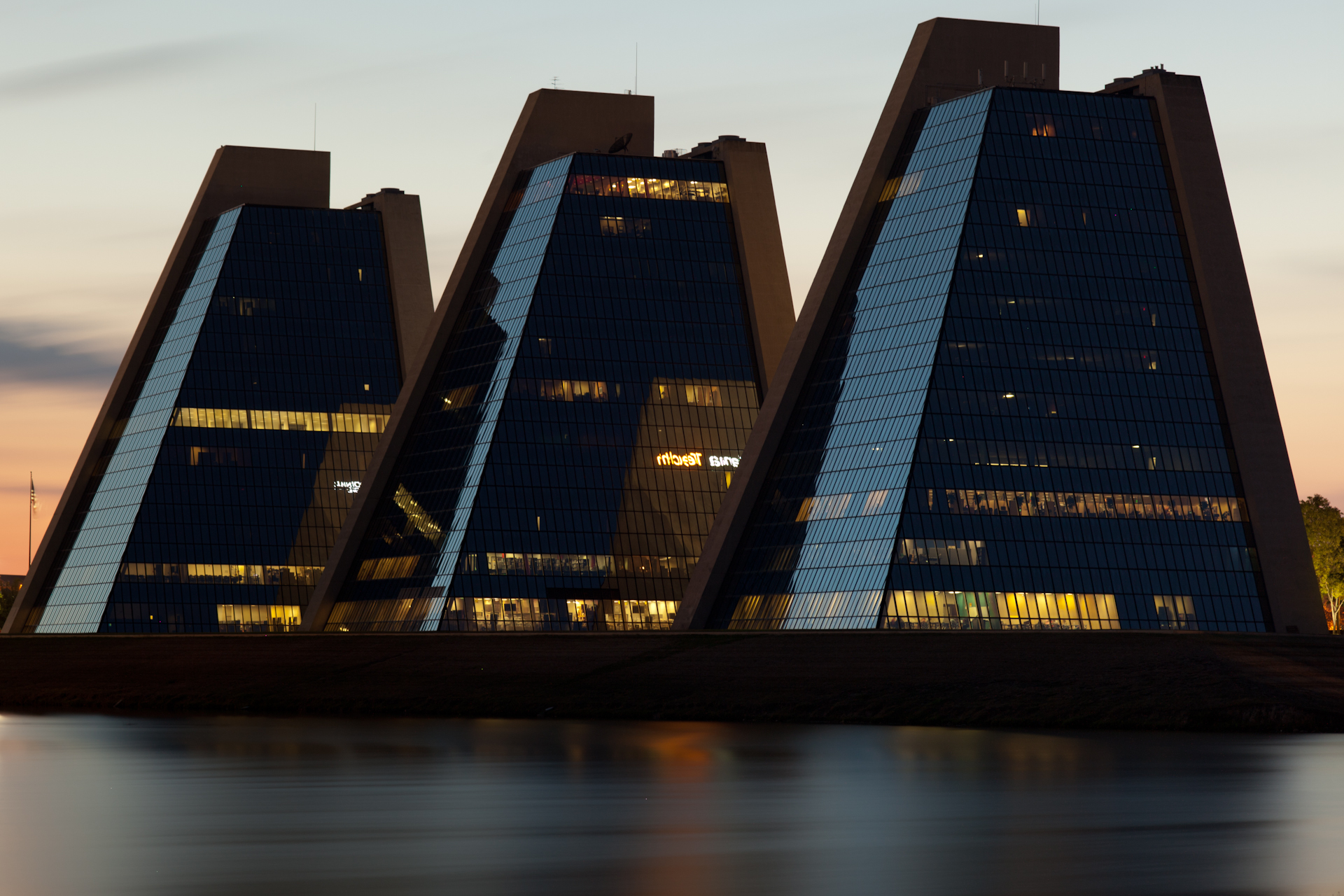
- The Pyramids on Pike Township's northeast side in 2011

- Coordinates: 39°52′16″N 86°15′11″W
- Country: United States
- State: Indiana
- County: Marion
- Named for: Zebulon Pike

Government
  - Type: Indiana township

Area
  - Total: 44.1 sq mi (114.2 km^{2})
  - Land: 41.5 sq mi (107.6 km^{2})
  - Water: 2.5 sq mi (6.6 km^{2})
- Elevation: 850 ft (259 m)

Population (2020)
  - Total: 83,030
  - Density: 1,999/sq mi (771.7/km^{2})
- Time zone: UTC-5 (Eastern (EST))
  - Summer (DST): UTC-4 (EDT)
- Area codes: 317/463
- FIPS code: 18-59742
- GNIS feature ID: 0453735

Pike Township is one of the nine townships of Marion County, Indiana, United States, North America, located in the northwestern portion of the county. The entire township is administratively part of Indianapolis, although a portion of the included town of Clermont lies in the southwest corner. As of the 2020 census, Pike Township had a population of 83,030 living in an area of approximately 107 km² (41.5 mi²). Pike Township was named for Zebulon Pike.

The Metropolitan School District of Pike Township nearly covers the township, but a small area in the south is within the Indianapolis Public Schools system. The private Brebeuf Jesuit Preparatory School is also in this township.

Eagle Creek Park, Lafayette Square Mall, and numerous corporate headquarters are located in Pike Township. Notable organizations based in Pike Township include Chip Ganassi Racing, Corteva, Herff Jones, the Indianapolis Colts, Kiwanis International, Klipsch Audio Technologies, Lids, American Legion Auxiliary, and the National FFA Organization. The north junction of I-65 and I-465 is located in this township and while I-74 runs through the southwest corner, there are no exits available from I-74.

Historical population
Census	Pop.	Note	%±
1890	1,999		—
1900	2,006		0.4%
1910	1,944		−3.1%
1920	1,749		−10.0%
1930	2,129		21.7%
1940	2,404		12.9%
1950	3,316		37.9%
1960	6,662		100.9%
1970	14,970		124.7%
1980	25,336		69.2%
1990	45,204		78.4%
2000	71,465		58.1%
2010	77,895		9.0%
2020	83,030		6.6%
Source: US Decennial Census

== Geography ==
=== Municipalities ===
- Clermont (northern half)
- Indianapolis (partial)

=== Communities ===
- Augusta
- Traders Point
