= Sugar Creek =

Sugar Creek or Sugarcreek may refer to:

== Communities in the United States ==
- Sugar Creek, Indiana, a town
- Sugar Creek, Missouri, a city
- Sugarcreek, Ohio, a village
- Sugarcreek, Pennsylvania, a borough
- Sugar Creek (Texas), a subdivision in Fort Bend County, Texas
- Sugar Creek, Wisconsin, a town
- Sugar Creek Township (disambiguation)

== Waterways ==
=== United States ===
==== Georgia ====
- Sugar Creek (Toccoa River tributary)
- Sugar Creek (Ocmulgee River tributary)

==== Illinois ====
- Sugar Creek (Sangamon River tributary)

==== Indiana ====
- Sugar Creek (Wabash River tributary)
- Sugar Creek (Driftwood River tributary)

==== Minnesota ====
- Sugar Creek (Minnesota)

==== Missouri ====
- Sugar Creek (Grand River)
- Sugar Creek (Honey Creek)
- Sugar Creek (Mississippi River)
- Sugar Creek (Missouri River)
- Sugar Creek (Perche Creek)
- Sugar Creek (Salt River)
- Sugar Creek (Thompson River)
- Sugar Creek (Wyaconda River)

==== New York ====
- Sugar Creek (Keuka Lake)

==== North Carolina ====
- Sugar Creek (North Carolina)

==== Ohio ====
- Sugar Creek (Little Miami River tributary)
- Sugar Creek (Ottawa River tributary)
- Sugar Creek (Tuscarawas River tributary)

==== Oklahoma ====
- Sugar Creek (Caddo County, Oklahoma)

==== Pennsylvania ====
- Sugar Creek (Susquehanna River tributary)
- Sugar Creek (French Creek tributary)

==== Tennessee ====
- Sugar Creek (Duck River) tributary

==== West Virginia ====
- Sugar Creek (Middle Island Creek tributary)
- Sugar Creek (Laurel Creek tributary)

=== Australia ===
- Sugar Creek (New South Wales), a tributary of the Wallingat River

== Other uses ==
- Sugar Creek (film), a 2007 supernatural western thriller

== See also ==
- Big Sugar Creek, in Missouri
- Little Sugar Creek in Arkansas and Missouri
- Sugar Run Creek, a tributary of the Susquehanna River in Pennsylvania
- Sugar River (disambiguation)
