= Ackerson =

Ackerson is a surname. Notable people with the surname include:

- Duane Ackerson (1942–2020), American poet and fiction writer
- Ed Ackerson (1965–2019), American musician (Polara) and producer
- Jon Ackerson (born 1943), American lawyer and politician
- Nels Ackerson, American lawyer and politician

== See also ==
- Ackerson, Michigan
- Ackerson, New Jersey
- Ackerson Creek, a river in California
- Ackerson Mountain, a mountain in California
- T. B. Ackerson Company, American real estate company
