= Sugar Creek Township, Indiana =

Sugar Creek Township, Indiana may refer to one of the following places:

- Sugar Creek Township, Boone County, Indiana
- Sugar Creek Township, Clinton County, Indiana
- Sugar Creek Township, Hancock County, Indiana
- Sugar Creek Township, Montgomery County, Indiana
- Sugar Creek Township, Parke County, Indiana
- Sugar Creek Township, Shelby County, Indiana
- Sugar Creek Township, Vigo County, Indiana

== See also ==
- Sugar Creek, Indiana, an unincorporated community in Shelby County
- Sugar Creek Township (disambiguation)
