= Sugar Creek Township =

Sugar Creek Township may refer to the following places in the United States:

== Arkansas ==
- Sugar Creek Township, Benton County, Arkansas, in Benton County, Arkansas
- Sugar Creek Township, Greene County, Arkansas, in Greene County, Arkansas
- Sugar Creek Township, Logan County, Arkansas, in Logan County, Arkansas

== Illinois ==
- Sugar Creek Township, Clinton County, Illinois

== Indiana ==
- Sugar Creek Township, Boone County, Indiana
- Sugar Creek Township, Clinton County, Indiana
- Sugar Creek Township, Hancock County, Indiana
- Sugar Creek Township, Montgomery County, Indiana
- Sugar Creek Township, Parke County, Indiana
- Sugar Creek Township, Shelby County, Indiana
- Sugar Creek Township, Vigo County, Indiana

== Iowa ==
- Sugar Creek Township, Cedar County, Iowa
- Sugar Creek Township, Poweshiek County, Iowa

== Kansas ==
- Sugar Creek Township, Miami County, Kansas, in Miami County, Kansas

== Missouri ==
- Sugar Creek Township, Barry County, Missouri
- Sugar Creek Township, Harrison County, Missouri

== Ohio ==
- Sugar Creek Township, Allen County, Ohio
- Sugar Creek Township, Putnam County, Ohio
- Sugar Creek Township, Stark County, Ohio
- Sugar Creek Township, Tuscarawas County, Ohio
- Sugar Creek Township, Wayne County, Ohio

== See also ==
- Sugar Creek (disambiguation)
- Sugarcreek Township (disambiguation)
