= Union Township, Boone County, Indiana =

Union Township
- Township
- Location of Union Township in Boone County
- Coordinates: 40°01′56″N 86°17′31″W
- Country: United States
- State: Indiana
- County: Boone

Government
  - Type: Indiana township

Area
  - Total: 25.15 sq mi (65.1 km^{2})
  - Land: 25.11 sq mi (65.0 km^{2})
  - Water: 0.04 sq mi (0.10 km^{2})
- Elevation: 928 ft (283 m)

Population (2010)
  - Total: 2,357
  - Density: 93.9/sq mi (36.3/km^{2})
- FIPS code: 18-77156
- GNIS feature ID: 453908

Union Township is one of twelve townships in Boone County, Indiana. As of the 2010 census, its population was 2,357 and it contained 864 housing units.

== History ==
The Simpson-Breedlove House was listed on the National Register of Historic Places in 2016.

== Geography ==
According to the 2010 census, the township has a total area of 25.15 square miles (65.1 km^{2}), of which 25.11 square miles (65.0 km^{2}) (or 99.84%) is land and 0.04 square miles (0.10 km^{2}) (or 0.16%) is water.

=== Unincorporated towns ===
- Big Springs
- Gadsden
- Northfield
- Rosston

=== Adjacent townships ===
- Center (west)
- Eagle (south)
- Marion (north)
- Worth (southwest)
- Clay Township, Hamilton County (southeast)
- Washington Township, Hamilton County (east)

=== Major highways ===
- U.S. Route 421
- Indiana State Road 32
