= CountryMark =

American agricultural cooperative firm

Countrymark Cooperative Inc.
- Type: Private
- Industry: Oil and gas
- Headquarters: 225 South East Street, Indianapolis, Indiana, U.S.
- Area served: Indiana, Ohio, Michigan, Illinois and Kentucky
- Key people: Matt Smorch (CEO)
- Products: Diesel fuel, gasoline, lubricants
- Website: www.countrymark.com

CountryMark Cooperative Inc. is an agricultural cooperative firm, headquartered in Indianapolis, Indiana, United States, that operates in the United States crude oil and oil refinery businesses. Its chief asset is an oil refinery in Mount Vernon, Indiana, which is fitted to process 34,000 barrels-per-day of crude from the Illinois Basin, a series of small oilfields in southeastern Illinois, southwestern Indiana, and western Kentucky. In addition to refining oil and retailing oil products, its fleet of trucks gathers crude oil from Illinois Basin producers and, in 2008, acquired the Evansville-based company Core Minerals and entered the business of searching for and directly producing crude oil. CountryMark also owns a 238-mile-long (383 km) finished product pipeline, running from the refinery in Mount Vernon to Peru, Indiana. CountryMark has terminals at the refinery, along the pipeline at Switz City and Jolietville, Indiana, and at the terminus of the pipeline at Peru.

While CountryMark has historically specialized in the business of producing diesel motor fuels and lubricants that are attuned to the needs of agricultural machinery and farmer-drivers, Illinois Basin crude oil can be manufactured into a wide variety of products, and as of 2012 CountryMark has a small market share of the overall Indiana consumer market for oil products.

CountryMark's self-image is that of the only "American-owned" oil refinery in Indiana. There are two oil refineries in Indiana; the other one, which has a processing capacity of 18x that of CountryMark's Mount Vernon refinery, is owned by BP plc, a British firm.
