= Eagletown =

Eagletown may refer to:

- Eagletown, Indiana
- Eagletown, Oklahoma
