= Rosston =

Rosston may refer to a place in the United States:

- Rosston, Arkansas
- Rosston, Indiana
- Rosston, Oklahoma
- Rosston, Texas
