= Kirklin Township, Clinton County, Indiana =

Kirklin Township
- Township
- Location of Kirklin Township in Clinton County
- Coordinates: 40°12′58″N 86°22′38″W
- Country: United States
- State: Indiana
- County: Clinton
- Organized: 1837
- Named for: Nathan Kirk, settler

Government
  - Type: Indiana township

Area
  - Total: 35.06 sq mi (90.8 km^{2})
  - Land: 35.06 sq mi (90.8 km^{2})
  - Water: 0 sq mi (0 km^{2})
- Elevation: 909 ft (277 m)

Population (2020)
  - Total: 1,219
  - Density: 34.77/sq mi (13.42/km^{2})
- FIPS code: 18-39960
- GNIS feature ID: 453527

Kirklin Township is one of fourteen townships in Clinton County, Indiana. As of the 2020 census, its population was 1,219 (down from 1,380 at 2010) and it contained 544 housing units.

== History ==
The township was organized in 1837 from a piece of Jackson Township and named for Nathan Kirk, a local pioneer and the first settler in the eastern half of the county. Arriving in 1826, Kirk erected a log cabin in section 34 on the eastern side of what was known as Twelve Mile Prairie and remained the only white resident of the area that would become Kirklin Township until 1829, when Thaddeus Panburn and Daniel Hunter came and entered his employ.

Sugar Creek Township was set off from a piece of Kirklin Township in 1841. The Monon Railroad, arriving in 1883, was the first rail line to pass through the township and led to the founding of the town of Cyclone.

== Geography ==
According to the 2010 census, the township has a total area of 35.06 square miles (90.8 km^{2}), all land.

=== Cities and towns ===
- Kirklin

=== Adjacent townships ===
- Michigan Township (north)
- Johnson Township (northeast)
- Sugar Creek Township (east)
- Marion Township, Boone County (southeast)
- Clinton Township, Boone County (southwest)
- Jackson Township (west)
- Center Township (northwest)

=== Major highways ===
- U.S. Route 421
- Indiana State Road 38

=== Cemeteries ===
The township contains six cemeteries: Bogan, Dew, Earp, Kings Corner, McIntire, Oak Hill and Stowers.
