= Jefferson Township, Boone County, Indiana =

Jefferson Township
- Township
- Location of Jefferson Township in Boone County
- Coordinates: 40°03′10″N 86°37′17″W
- Country: United States
- State: Indiana
- County: Boone

Government
  - Type: Indiana township

Area
  - Total: 46.47 sq mi (120.4 km^{2})
  - Land: 46.47 sq mi (120.4 km^{2})
  - Water: 0 sq mi (0 km^{2})
- Elevation: 892 ft (272 m)

Population (2020)
  - Total: 1,485
  - Density: 31.5/sq mi (12.2/km^{2})
- FIPS code: 18-37854
- GNIS feature ID: 453479

Jefferson Township is one of twelve townships in Boone County, Indiana. As of the 2010 census, its population was 1,464 and it contained 544 housing units.

== Geography ==
According to the 2010 census, the township has a total area of 46.47 square miles (120.4 km^{2}), all land.

=== Unincorporated towns ===
- Dover
- Hazelrigg
- Max
- Shannondale

(This list is based on USGS data and may include former settlements.)

=== Adjacent townships ===
- Center (east)
- Jackson (south)
- Sugar Creek (north)
- Washington (northeast)
- Franklin Township, Montgomery County (west)
- Walnut Township, Montgomery County (southwest)

=== Major highways ===
- Indiana State Road 32
- Indiana State Road 75

=== Cemeteries ===
The township contains six cemeteries. They include: Cox Cemetery, Dover Cemetery, Old Mount Zion, Hiestand Cemetery, Taylor Cemetery, and Pleasant View Church Cemetery.
