= Milledgeville =

Milledgeville may refer to:

== Places in the United States ==
- Milledgeville, Georgia, the most populous Milledgeville in the US
- Milledgeville, Illinois
- Milledgeville, Indiana
- Milledgeville, Ohio
- Milledgeville, Tennessee

== Other uses ==
- USS Milledgeville, the name of three ships in the United States Navy
- Central State Hospital (Milledgeville, Georgia), a mental health facility in Milledgeville, Georgia
