= Mechanicsburg, Boone County, Indiana =

Mechanicsburg
- Unincorporated community
- Boone County's location in Indiana

- Location in Boone County
- Coordinates: 40°09′35″N 86°28′52″W
- Country: United States
- State: Indiana
- County: Boone
- Township: Washington
- Established: 1835
- Founder: James Snow
- Elevation: 883 ft (269 m)
- Time zone: UTC-5 (Eastern (EST))
  - Summer (DST): UTC-4 (EDT)
- ZIP code: 46050
- Area code: 765
- FIPS code: 18-48150
- GNIS feature ID: 438956

Mechanicsburg is an unincorporated community in Washington Township, Boone County, in the U.S. state of Indiana.

== History ==
Mechanicsburg was laid out in 1835 by a man named James Snow. Many of the pioneer settlers were skilled mechanics, hence the name.

== Geography ==
Mechanicsburg is located at 40°09′35″N 86°28′52″W.

The town straddles Sugar Creek, where Indiana State Road 39 crosses the stream. About two thirds of the residences, and the town's only church, are south of the stream. There was a second bridge over Sugar Creek, which carried Burg Street, but this was demolished sometime between 1980 and 2000.

== Culture ==
Mechanicsburg has one of the few remaining operational drive-in theaters, Mel's Drive-in (formerly the Frankfort-Lebanon Drive-in Theater).
