= Center Township, Boone County, Indiana =

Center Township
- Township
- Seal

- Location of Center Township in Boone County
- Coordinates: 40°02′49″N 86°27′28″W
- Country: United States
- State: Indiana
- County: Boone

Government
  - Type: Indiana township

Area
  - Total: 65.33 sq mi (169.2 km^{2})
  - Land: 65.33 sq mi (169.2 km^{2})
  - Water: 0 sq mi (0 km^{2})
- Elevation: 932 ft (284 m)

Population (2020)
  - Total: 18,846
  - Density: 276/sq mi (107/km^{2})
- Time zone: UTC-5 (Eastern (EST))
  - Summer (DST): UTC-4 (EDT)
- Area code: 765
- FIPS code: 18-11242
- GNIS feature ID: 453173
- Website: www.centertwpboone.com

Center Township is one of twelve townships in Boone County, Indiana. As of the 2010 census, its population was 18,030 and it contained 7,934 housing units. It was named from its location at the geographic center of Boone County.

== History ==
Andrew B. VanHuys Round Barn was listed on the National Register of Historic Places in 1993.

== Geography ==
According to the 2010 census, the township has a total area of 65.33 square miles (169.2 km^{2}), all land.

=== Cities and towns ===
- Lebanon (the county seat)
- Ulen

=== Unincorporated towns ===
- Brendan Wood
- Hazel College
- Northfield Village
- Stringtown

(This list is based on USGS data and may include former settlements.)

=== Adjacent townships ===
- Clinton (northeast)
- Harrison (southwest)
- Jackson (southwest)
- Jefferson (west)
- Marion (northeast)
- Perry (southeast)
- Union (east)
- Washington (northwest)
- Worth (southeast)

=== Major highways ===
- Interstate 65
- U.S. Route 52
- Indiana State Road 32
- Indiana State Road 39

=== Cemeteries ===
The township contains four cemeteries: Center, Dowden, Oak Hill and Robinson.
