= Little Sugar River =

There are a few streams named Little Sugar River in the United States:

- Little Sugar River (New Hampshire)
- Little Sugar River (Wisconsin)

== See also ==
- South Branch Little Sugar River, in Michigan
- Sugar River (disambiguation)
