= Fayette, Indiana =

- Unincorporated community
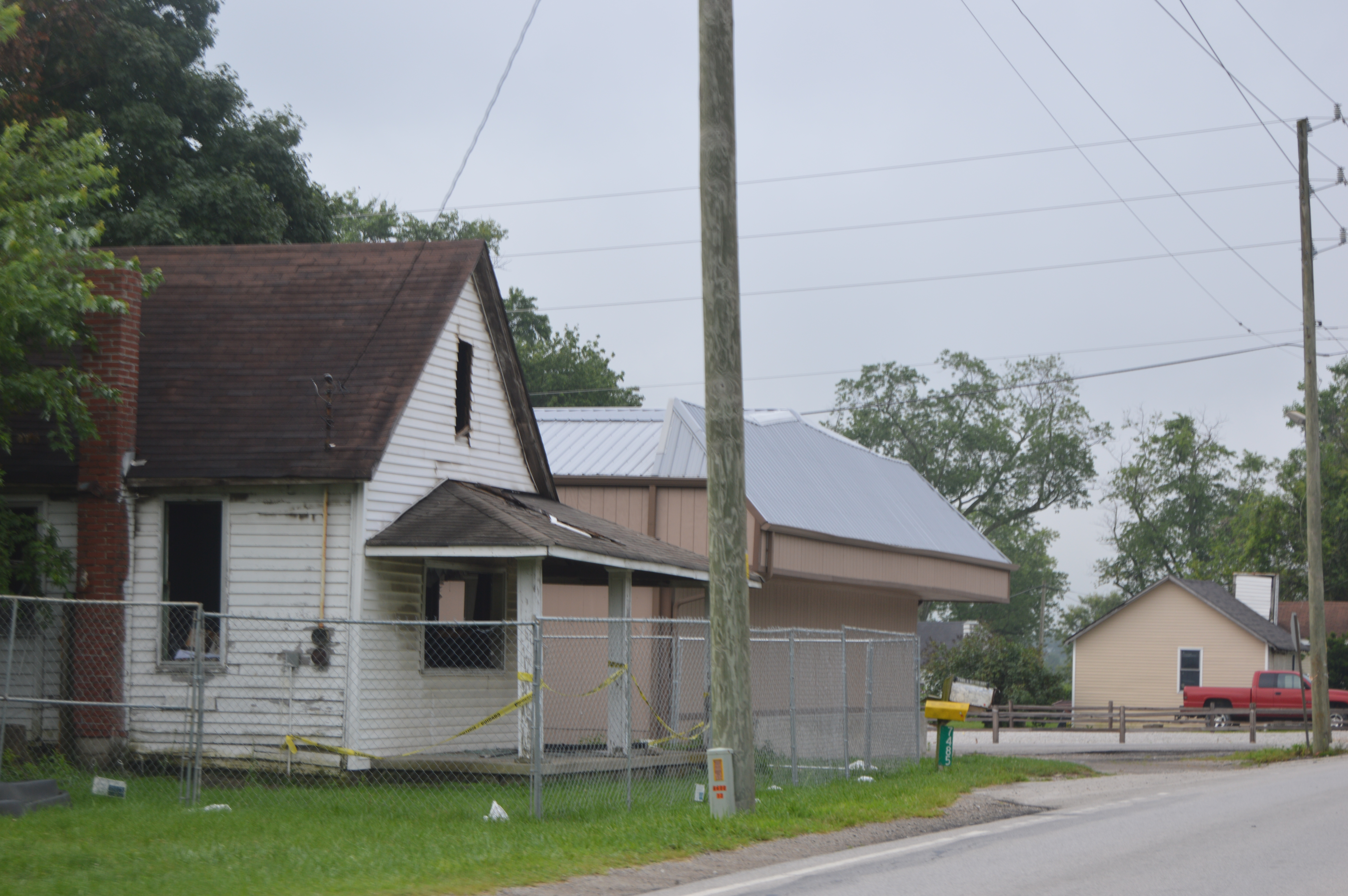
- Along State Road 267

- Boone County's location in Indiana

- Location in Boone County
- Coordinates: 39°55′52″N 86°23′50″W
- Country: United States
- State: Indiana
- County: Boone
- Township: Perry
- Elevation: 932 ft (284 m)
- Time zone: UTC-5 (Eastern (EST))
  - Summer (DST): UTC-4 (EDT)
- ZIP code: 46052
- Area code: 317
- FIPS code: 18-22846
- GNIS feature ID: 434422

Fayette is an unincorporated community in Perry Township, Boone County, in the U.S. state of Indiana.

== History ==
The community was likely named for Gilbert du Motier, Marquis de Lafayette.

== Geography ==
Fayette is located at 39°55′52″N 86°23′50″W.
