= Lamong, Indiana =

- Unincorporated community
- Location within Indiana Location within the United States
- Coordinates: 40°05′08″N 86°12′12″W
- Country: United States
- State: Indiana
- County: Hamilton
- Township: Washington
- Elevation: 945 ft (288 m)
- ZIP code: 46069
- FIPS code: 18-41832
- GNIS feature ID: 438236

Lamong is an unincorporated community in Washington Township, Hamilton County, Indiana.

== History ==
A post office was established at Lamong in 1874, and remained in operation until it was discontinued in 1902.
