= Terhune, Indiana =

- Unincorporated community
- Boone County's location in Indiana

- Location in Boone County
- Coordinates: 40°09′55″N 86°16′49″W
- Country: United States
- State: Indiana
- County: Boone
- Township: Marion
- Elevation: 935 ft (285 m)
- Time zone: UTC-5 (Eastern (EST))
  - Summer (DST): UTC-4 (EDT)
- ZIP code: 46069
- Area code: 765
- FIPS code: 18-75338
- GNIS feature ID: 444644

Terhune is an unincorporated community in Marion Township, Boone County, in the U.S. state of Indiana.

== History ==
An early variant name was "Kimberlin". A post office was established as Kimberlin in 1879, the name was changed to Terhune in 1883, and the post office was discontinued in 1917.

== Geography ==
Terhune is located at 40°09′55″N 86°16′49″W.

== In popular culture ==
In the 1986 movie Hoosiers (film), newly arrived-in-Indiana high school coach Norman Dale stops at a combined gas station-general store which was filmed in Terhune. In a deleted movie scene, after honking for service, Coach Dale hears the store owner saying loudly a customer is there, but a boy wearing a letterman's jacket with a "T" on it is shooting baskets on a broken basketball goal with a grain elevator with "Terhune" clearly visible in the background saying "(I've) got a string (of successful shots) going." The owner then comes out and starts friendly conversation and then questioning leading to Coach Dale saying he's going to be the new Hickory High Basketball Coach. The owner, who knew about Hickory's coaching situation, then says "I heard they were in trouble, I didn't know they were desperate." After Dale tells him to keep the change from the dollar he gave him to cover the gas bill, the owner tells him "Hey friend, keep the tight chain on your end game now." Later in the movie, it's revealed that the store owner is Terhune's coach and he and Dale get into a most heated argument in the sectionals of the Indiana all-schools High School Basketball tournament when a Hickory player is very seriously injured.
