= Harrison Township, Boone County, Indiana =

Harrison Township
- Township
- Location of Harrison Township in Boone County
- Coordinates: 39°57′39″N 86°29′33″W
- Country: United States
- State: Indiana
- County: Boone

Government
  - Type: Indiana township

Area
  - Total: 24.38 sq mi (63.1 km^{2})
  - Land: 24.38 sq mi (63.1 km^{2})
  - Water: 0 sq mi (0 km^{2})
- Elevation: 948 ft (289 m)

Population (2020)
  - Total: 725
  - Density: 28.9/sq mi (11.2/km^{2})
- FIPS code: 18-31648
- GNIS feature ID: 453379

Harrison Township is one of twelve townships in Boone County, Indiana. As of the 2010 census, its population was 704 and it contained 288 housing units.

== Geography ==
According to the 2010 census, the township has a total area of 24.38 square miles (63.1 km^{2}), all land.

=== Unincorporated towns ===
- Milledgeville
- New Brunswick

=== Adjacent townships ===
- Center (northeast)
- Jackson (west)
- Perry (east)
- Middle Township, Hendricks County (south)
- Union Township, Hendricks County (southwest)

=== Major highways ===
- Indiana State Road 39

=== Cemeteries ===
The township contains two cemeteries: Mount Union and Poplar Grove.
