= Hortonville, Indiana =

- Unincorporated community and Census-designated place
- Location within Indiana Location within the United States
- Coordinates: 40°05′16″N 86°09′27″W
- Country: United States
- State: Indiana
- County: Hamilton
- Township: Westfield Washington
- Elevation: 932 ft (284 m)
- ZIP code: 46069 (Sheridan)
- Area code: 317
- FIPS code: 18-34816
- GNIS feature ID: 2830395

Hortonville is an unincorporated community in Washington Township, Hamilton County, Indiana, United States.

== History ==
A post office was established at Hortonville in 1883, and remained in operation until it was discontinued in 1933. The community's namesake, John B. Horton, served as first postmaster.

== Demographics ==
The United States Census Bureau delineated Hortonville as a census designated place in the 2022 American Community Survey.
