= Big Springs, Indiana =

- Unincorporated community
- Boone County's location in Indiana

- Location in Boone County
- Coordinates: 40°04′13″N 86°15′38″W
- Country: United States
- State: Indiana
- County: Boone
- Township: Marion
- Elevation: 925 ft (282 m)
- Time zone: UTC-5 (Eastern (EST))
  - Summer (DST): UTC-4 (EDT)
- ZIP code: 46077
- GNIS feature ID: 431066

Big Springs is an unincorporated community in Marion Township, Boone County, in the U.S. state of Indiana.

== History ==
A post office at Big Springs (also historically called Big Spring and Bigspring) operated between 1883 and 1900.
