= Gadsden, Indiana =

Unincorporated community in Union Township

- Unincorporated community
- Boone County's location in Indiana

- Location in Boone County
- Coordinates: 40°02′50″N 86°20′45″W
- Country: United States
- State: Indiana
- County: Boone
- Township: Union
- Elevation: 951 ft (290 m)
- Time zone: UTC-5 (Eastern (EST))
  - Summer (DST): UTC-4 (EDT)
- ZIP code: 46052
- FIPS code: 18-26188
- GNIS feature ID: 434912

Gadsden is an unincorporated community in Union Township, Boone County, in the U.S. state of Indiana.

== History ==
A post office was established at Gadsden in 1887, and remained in operation until it was discontinued in 1909.
