= Waugh, Indiana =

- Unincorporated community
- Boone County's location in Indiana

- Location in Boone County
- Coordinates: 40°05′04″N 86°18′24″W
- Country: United States
- State: Indiana
- County: Boone
- Township: Marion
- Elevation: 958 ft (292 m)
- Time zone: UTC-5 (Eastern (EST))
  - Summer (DST): UTC-4 (EDT)
- ZIP code: 46075
- Area code: 765
- FIPS code: 18-81422
- GNIS feature ID: 445562

Waugh is an unincorporated community in Marion Township, Boone County, in the U.S. state of Indiana.

== History ==
A post office was established at Waugh in 1891, and remained in operation until it was discontinued in 1900.

== Geography ==
Waugh is located at 40°05′04″N 86°18′24″W.
