= Clinton Township, Boone County, Indiana =

Clinton Township
- Township
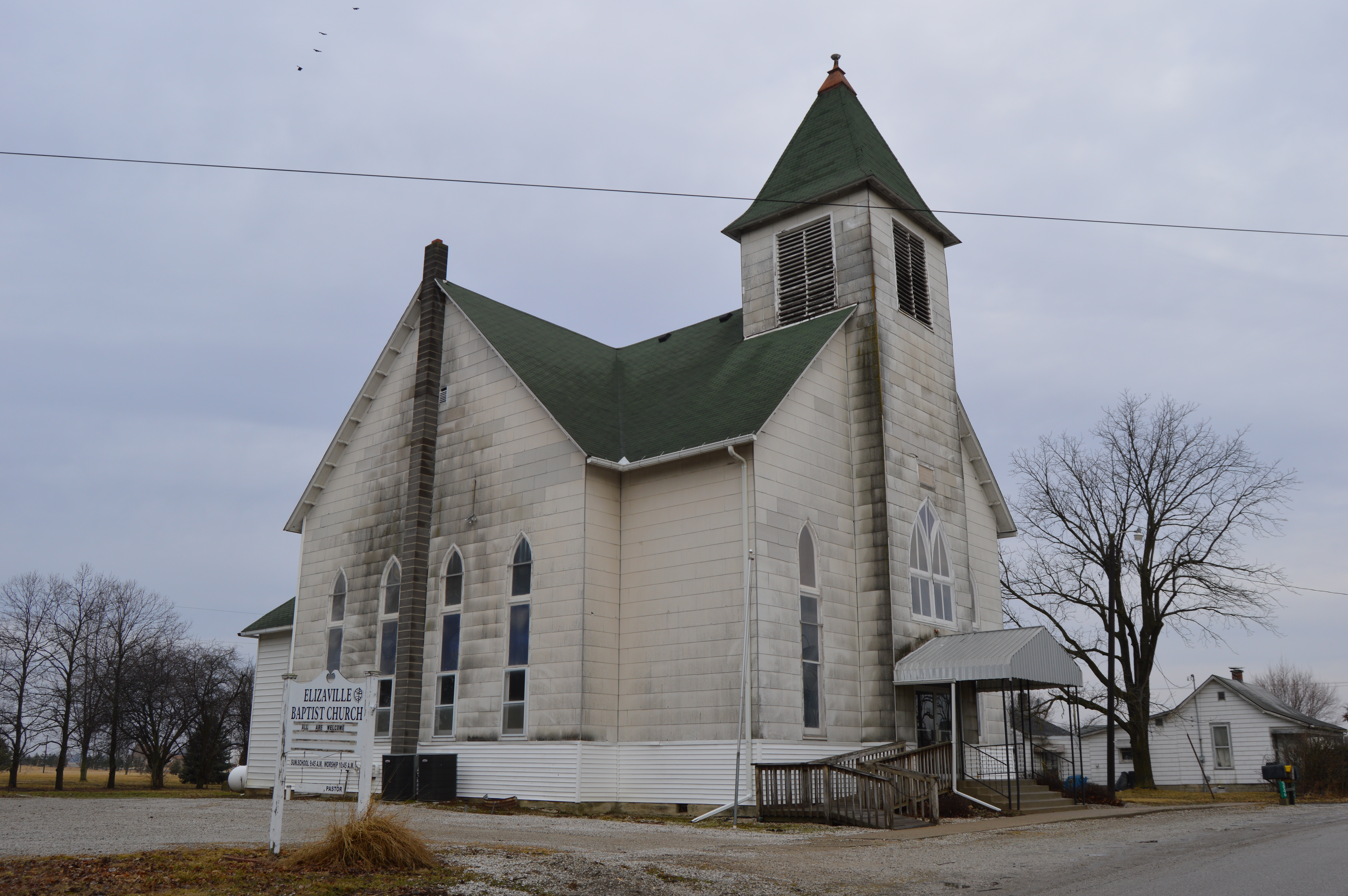
- Elizaville Baptist Church

- Location of Clinton Township in Boone County
- Coordinates: 40°08′01″N 86°24′22″W
- Country: United States
- State: Indiana
- County: Boone

Government
  - Type: Indiana township

Area
  - Total: 32.44 sq mi (84.0 km^{2})
  - Land: 32.44 sq mi (84.0 km^{2})
  - Water: 0 sq mi (0 km^{2})
- Elevation: 938 ft (286 m)

Population (2020)
  - Total: 906
  - Density: 27.3/sq mi (10.5/km^{2})
- FIPS code: 18-13672
- GNIS feature ID: 453228

Clinton Township is one of twelve townships in Boone County, Indiana. As of the 2010 census, its population was 886 and it contained 351 housing units.

== History ==
Scotland Bridge was listed on the National Register of Historic Places in 1994.

== Geography ==
According to the 2010 census, the township has a total area of 32.44 square miles (84.0 km^{2}), all land.

=== Unincorporated towns ===
- Elizaville

=== Adjacent townships ===
- Center (southwest)
- Marion (east)
- Washington (west)
- Jackson Township, Clinton County (northwest)
- Kirklin Township, Clinton County (northeast)

=== Major highways ===
- Indiana State Road 47

=== Cemeteries ===
The township contains one cemetery, Garrett.
