= Darlington Covered Bridge =

- U.S. National Register of Historic Places
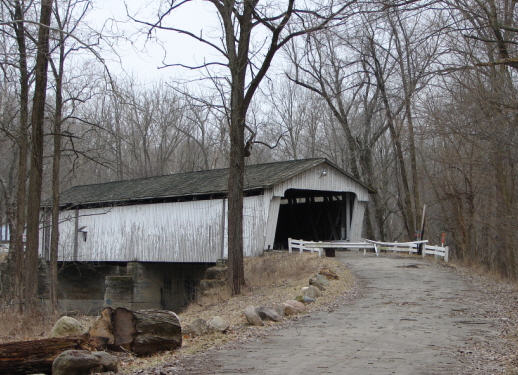
- Darlington Covered Bridge, March 2008

- Location within Indiana Location within the United States
- Location: County Roads 500N and 500E over Sugar Creek, west of Darlington in Franklin Township, Montgomery County, Indiana
- Coordinates: 40°6′29″N 86°47′37″W
- Area: less than one acre
- Built: 1868
- Built by: Smith Bridge Co.; Et al.
- Architectural style: Howe truss
- NRHP reference No.: 90001782
- Added to NRHP: November 28, 1990

Darlington Covered Bridge is a historic covered bridge located in Franklin Township, Montgomery County, Indiana. It was built in 1868, and is a single span, Howe truss covered bridge that spans Sugar Creek. It measures 166 feet long and has an overall width of 22 feet.

It was listed on the National Register of Historic Places in 1990.
