= Simpson-Breedlove House =

Historic house in Indiana, United States

- U.S. National Register of Historic Places
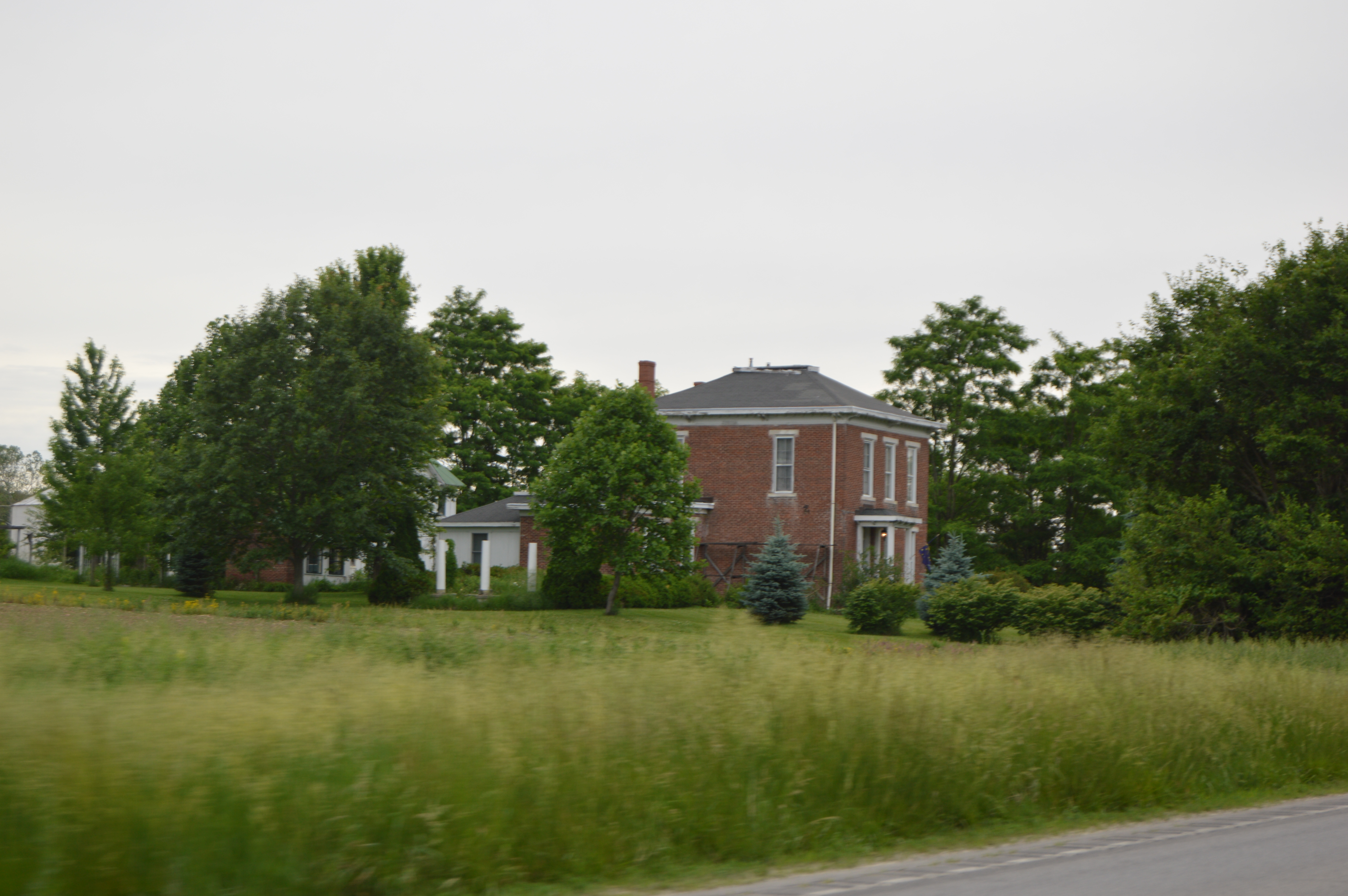
- Simpson-Breedlove House, June 2016

- Location within Boone County, Indiana Location within Indiana Location within the United States
- Location: 3650 U.S. Route 421, Eagle Township, Boone County, Indiana
- Coordinates: 39°59′24″N 86°15′40″W
- Area: 1.368 acres (0.554 ha)
- Built: c. 1865
- Architectural style: Greek Revival, Italianate
- MPS: Rural Historical and Architectural Resources of Eagle Township (Boone County) and Pike Township (Marion County), Indiana, 1820-1956.
- NRHP reference No.: 16000075
- Added to NRHP: March 15, 2016

Simpson-Breedlove House is a historic home located at Union Township, Boone County, Indiana. It was built about 1865, and is a two-story, cubic, transitional Greek Revival / Italianate style brick farmhouse. It has a low hipped roof with a flat deck on top.

It was listed on the National Register of Historic Places in 2016.
