= Pike, Indiana =

- Unincorporated community
- Boone County's location in Indiana

- Location in Boone County
- Coordinates: 40°07′27″N 86°28′55″W
- Country: United States
- State: Indiana
- County: Boone
- Township: Washington
- Elevation: 915 ft (279 m)
- Time zone: UTC-5 (Eastern (EST))
  - Summer (DST): UTC-4 (EDT)
- ZIP code: 46052
- Area code: 765
- FIPS code: 18-59706
- GNIS feature ID: 441127

Pike is an unincorporated community in Washington Township, Boone County, in the U.S. state of Indiana.

== History ==
The first post office at Pike was called Pikes Crossing, in 1885. It was so named from its location at the crossing of a turnpike. The post office was later renamed Pike, and was discontinued in 1900.

== Geography ==
Pike is located at 40°07′27″N 86°28′55″W.
