= Jackson Township, Boone County, Indiana =

Jackson Township
- Township
- Location of Jackson Township in Boone County
- Coordinates: 39°57′49″N 86°37′02″W
- Country: United States
- State: Indiana
- County: Boone

Government
  - Type: Indiana township

Area
  - Total: 47.7 sq mi (124 km^{2})
  - Land: 47.68 sq mi (123.5 km^{2})
  - Water: 0.03 sq mi (0.078 km^{2})
- Elevation: 935 ft (285 m)

Population (2020)
  - Total: 2,746
  - Density: 57.3/sq mi (22.1/km^{2})
- FIPS code: 18-36792
- GNIS feature ID: 453432

Jackson Township is one of twelve townships in Boone County, Indiana. As of the 2010 census, its population was 2,731 and it contained 1,089 housing units.

== Geography ==
According to the 2010 census, the township has a total area of 47.7 square miles (124 km^{2}), of which 47.68 square miles (123.5 km^{2}) (or 99.96%) is land and 0.03 square miles (0.078 km^{2}) (or 0.06%) is water.

=== Cities and towns ===
- Advance
- Jamestown (vast majority)

=== Unincorporated towns ===
- Ward

=== Adjacent townships ===
- Center (northeast)
- Harrison (east)
- Jefferson (north)
- Clark Township, Montgomery County (southwest)
- Eel River Township, Hendricks County (south)
- Union Township, Hendricks County (southeast)
- Walnut Township, Montgomery County (west)

=== Major highways ===
- Interstate 74
- U.S. Route 136
- Indiana State Road 75
- Indiana State Road 234

=== Cemeteries ===
The township contains five cemeteries: Brown, Independent Order of Odd Fellows, Lowry, Porter and Union.
