= Howard School (Brownsburg, Indiana) =

- U.S. National Register of Historic Places
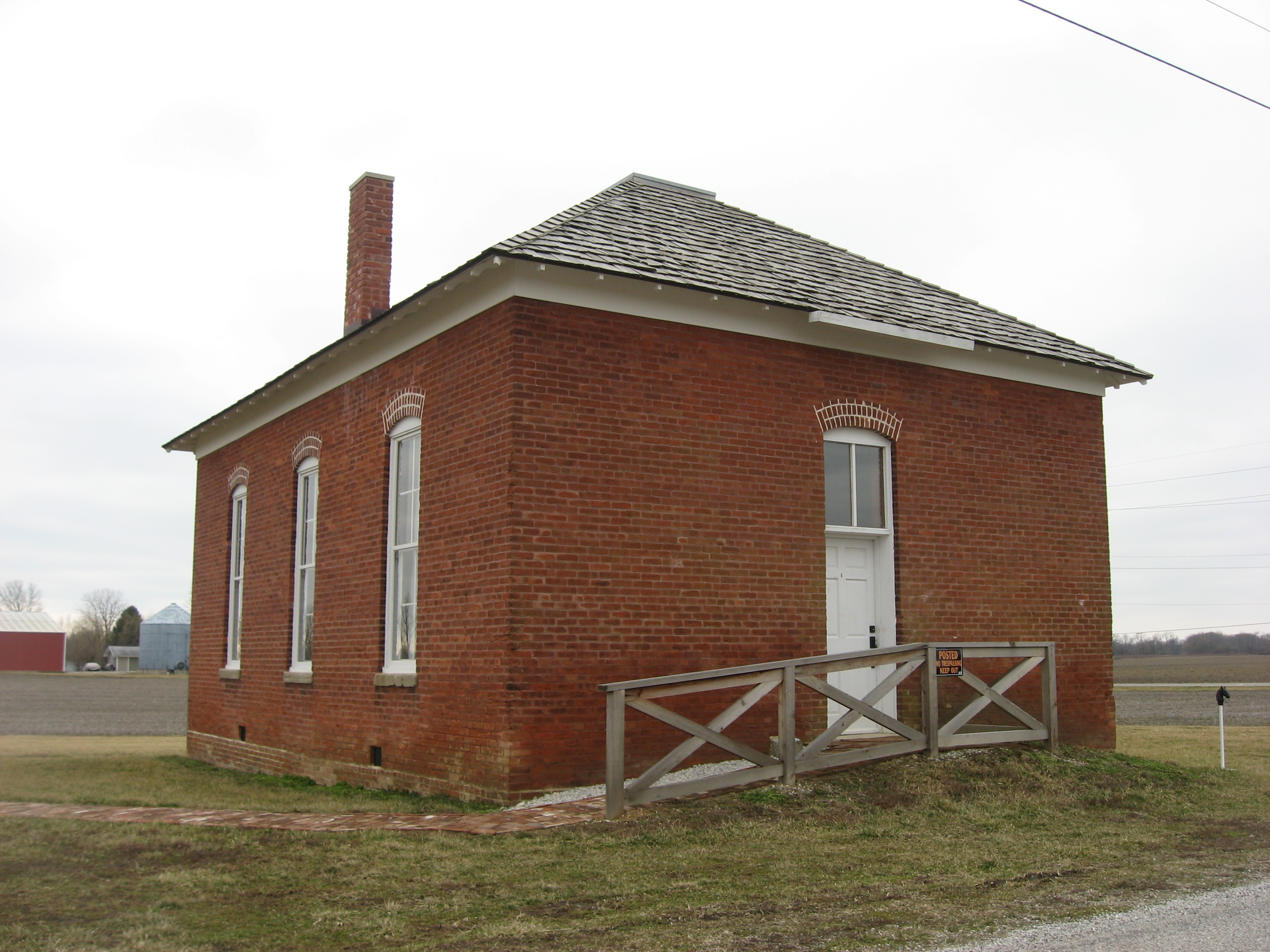
- Howard School, March 2011

- Location within Boone County, Indiana Location within Indiana Location within the United States
- Location: 4555 E. County Road 750S, north of Brownsburg, Perry Township, Boone County, Indiana
- Coordinates: 39°55′51″N 86°22′56″W
- Area: 1.1 acres (0.45 ha)
- Built: 1881
- Built by: Wing, George; McPharren, Jap
- Architectural style: Italianate
- MPS: Indiana's Public Common and High Schools MPS
- NRHP reference No.: 09000754
- Added to NRHP: September 24, 2009

Howard School, also known as Perry Township School #1, is a historic school building located at Perry Township, Boone County, Indiana. It was built about 1881, and is a one-story, rectangular red brick building with Italianate style design elements. The school closed in 1916. It was restored starting in 2004.

It was listed on the National Register of Historic Places in 2009.
