= Ward, Indiana =

- Unincorporated community
- Boone County's location in Indiana

- Location in Boone County
- Coordinates: 39°59′45″N 86°34′55″W
- Country: United States
- State: Indiana
- County: Boone
- Township: Jackson
- Elevation: 920 ft (280 m)
- Time zone: UTC-5 (Eastern (EST))
  - Summer (DST): UTC-4 (EDT)
- ZIP code: 46147
- Area code: 765

Ward is an unincorporated community in Jackson Township, Boone County, in the U.S. state of Indiana.

== History ==
Ward was laid out in 1883 by Thomas Ward, and named for him. A post office was established at Ward in 1884, and remained in operation until 1900.

== Geography ==
Ward is located at 39°59′45″N 86°34′55″W.
