= Sugar Creek Township, Boone County, Indiana =

Sugar Creek Township
- Township
- Location of Sugar Creek Township in Boone County
- Coordinates: 40°08′09″N 86°38′22″W
- Country: United States
- State: Indiana
- County: Boone

Government
  - Type: Indiana township

Area
  - Total: 33.59 sq mi (87.0 km^{2})
  - Land: 33.57 sq mi (86.9 km^{2})
  - Water: 0.03 sq mi (0.078 km^{2})
- Elevation: 814 ft (248 m)

Population (2020)
  - Total: 2,172
  - Density: 66.8/sq mi (25.8/km^{2})
- FIPS code: 18-73844
- GNIS feature ID: 453880

Sugar Creek Township is one of twelve townships in Boone County, Indiana. As of the 2010 census, its population was 2,243 and it contained 919 housing units.

== Geography ==
According to the 2010 census, the township has a total area of 33.59 square miles (87.0 km^{2}), of which 33.57 square miles (86.9 km^{2}) (or 99.94%) is land and 0.03 square miles (0.078 km^{2}) (or 0.09%) is water. The township is named for the Sugar Creek.

=== Cities and towns ===
- Thorntown

=== Adjacent townships ===
- Jefferson (south)
- Washington (east)
- Franklin Township, Montgomery County (southwest)
- Jackson Township, Clinton County (northeast)
- Perry Township, Clinton County (north)

=== Major highways ===
- U.S. Route 52
- Indiana State Road 47
- Indiana State Road 75

=== Cemeteries ===
The township contains seven cemeteries: Gipson, Sugar Plain, Old Cemetery, Walnut Grove, Green, Curry and Maple Lawn.
