= Sugar River =

Sugar River may refer to:

== Streams ==
- Sugar River (Michigan), a tributary of the Tittabawassee River
- Sugar River (New Hampshire), a tributary of the Connecticut River
- Sugar River (New York), a river in New York
- Sugar River (Wisconsin), a tributary of the Pecatonica River in Wisconsin and Illinois

== Other ==
- Sugar River State Trail, in Wisconsin

== See also ==
- Sugar Creek (disambiguation)
- Little Sugar River (disambiguation)
- Sugar (disambiguation)
