= Scotland Bridge =

- Formerly listed on the U.S. National Register of Historic Places
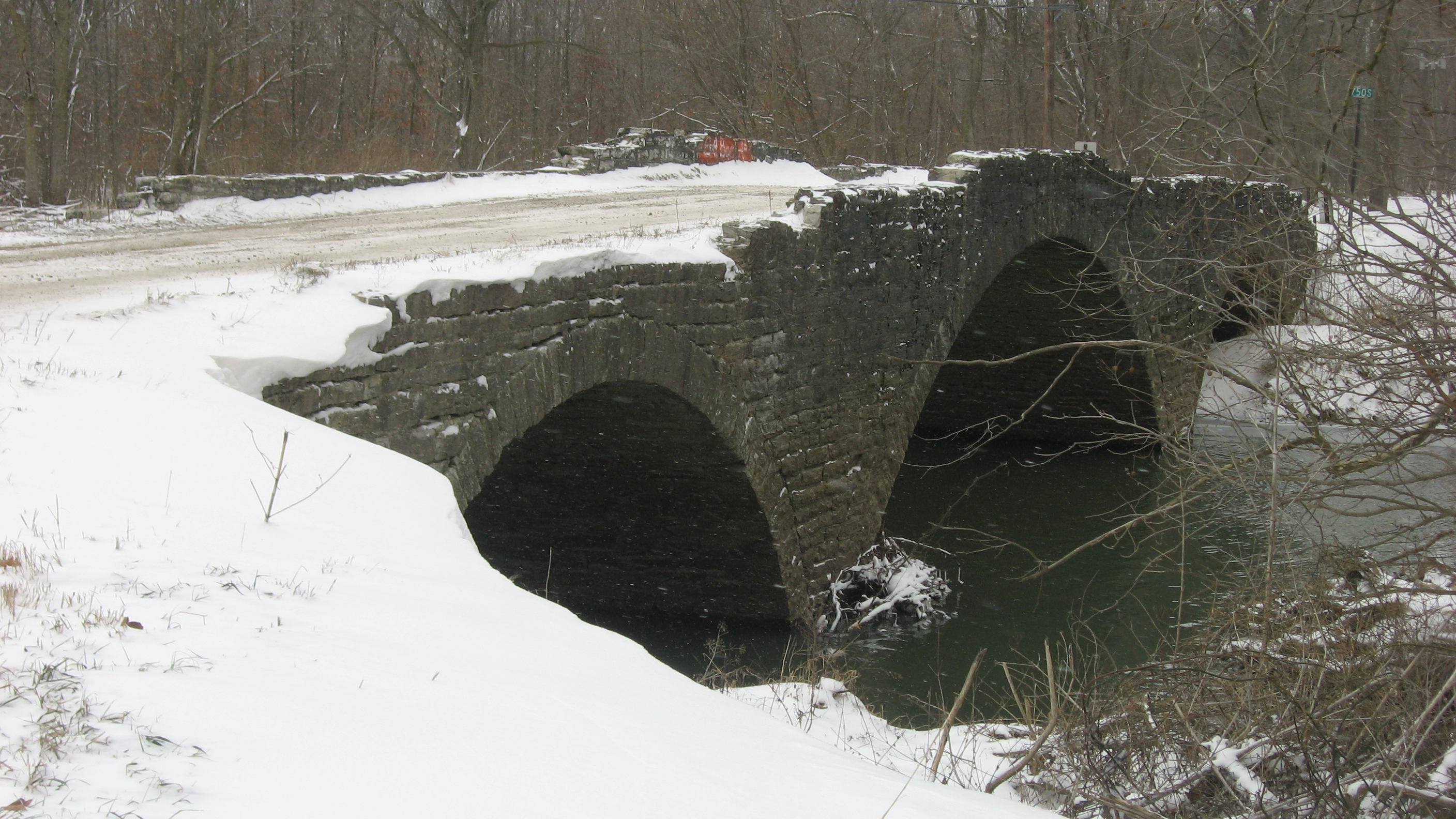
- Eastern side of the Scotland Bridge, January 2012

- Location within Boone County, Indiana Location within Indiana Location within the United States
- Location: Lost Rd. (County Road 200E) over Sugar Creek, east of Mechanicsburg, Clinton Township, Boone County, Indiana
- Coordinates: 40°10′36″N 86°25′54″W
- Area: less than one acre
- Built: 1901, 1908
- Built by: Multiple
- Architectural style: true masonry arch
- NRHP reference No.: 94000228

Significant dates
- Added to NRHP: March 17, 1994
- Removed from NRHP: March 5, 2024

Scotland Bridge, also known as Boone County Bridge #41, was a historic segmental arch bridge located at Clinton Township, Boone County, Indiana. It was built 1901 and rebuilt in 1908, and was a 120 feet (37 m), three-span bridge built of Indiana limestone.

It was listed on the National Register of Historic Places in 1994. In deteriorating condition and suffering significant structural issues, it was demolished in 2023. It was removed from the National Register in 2024.
