= Hazelrigg, Indiana =

- Unincorporated town
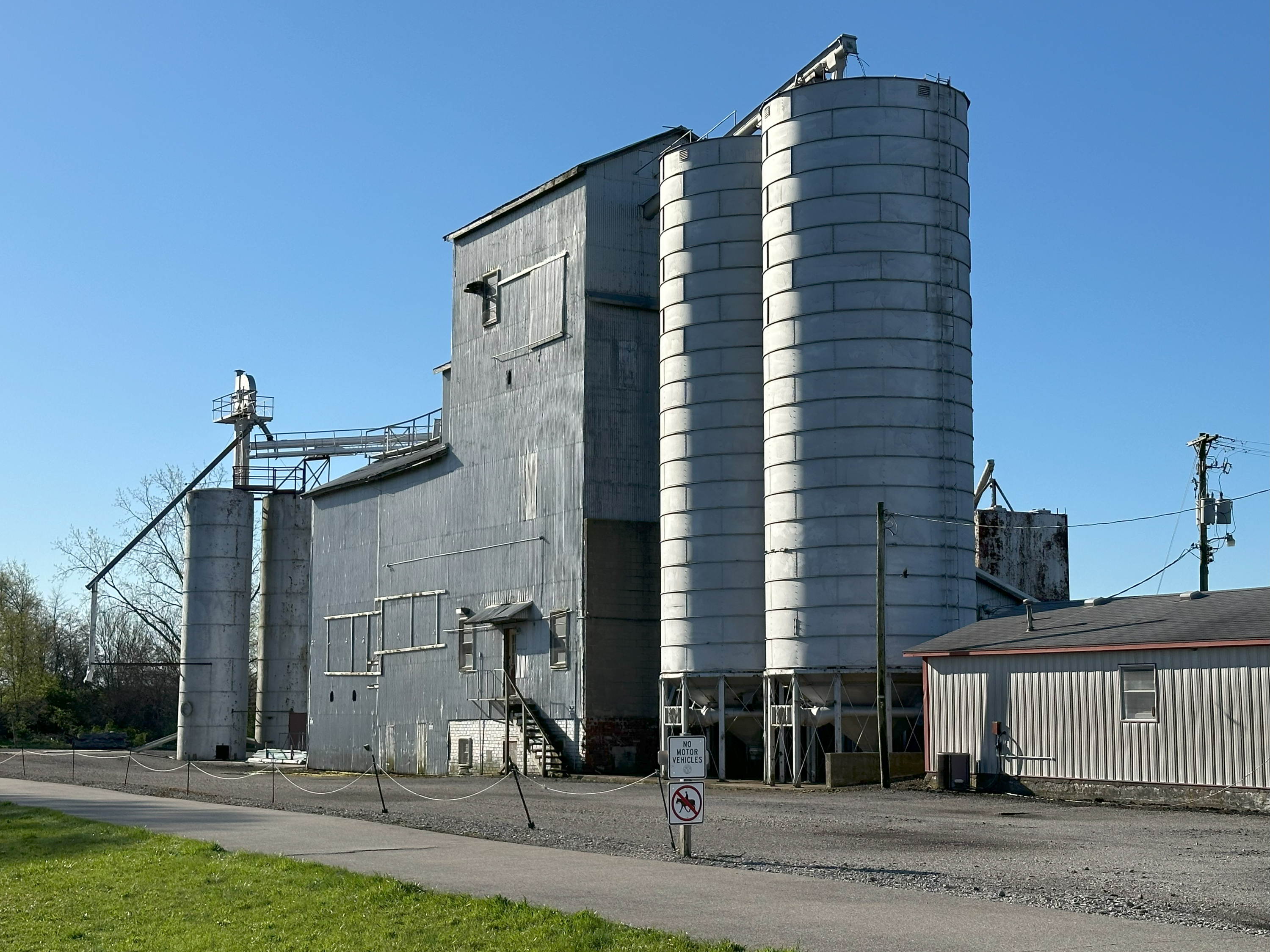
- Grain elevators in Hazelrigg, Indiana

- Boone County's location in Indiana

- Location in Boone County
- Coordinates: 40°04′56″N 86°33′47″W
- Country: United States
- State: Indiana
- County: Boone
- Township: Jefferson
- Elevation: 912 ft (278 m)
- Time zone: UTC-5 (Eastern (EST))
  - Summer (DST): UTC-4 (EDT)
- ZIP code: 46052
- Area code: 765
- FIPS code: 18-32656
- GNIS feature ID: 435938

Hazelrigg is an unincorporated town in Jefferson Township, Boone County, in the U.S. state of Indiana.

== History ==
Upon the founding of the Lafayette and Indianapolis (L&I) Railroad Company in the 1860s, prominent local businessman Harvey G. Hazelrigg (1807–1877) became a director of the company and a railway station was built on land he owned in rural Jefferson Township, a stop that was identified as Hazelrigg Station. The L&I railroad that ran through town soon became the Indianapolis, Cincinnati and Lafayette Railroad, then in 1880 became the Cincinnati, Indianapolis, St. Louis and Chicago Railway, and finally in 1889 was merged into the Cleveland, Cincinnati, Chicago and St. Louis Railway, commonly known as the Big Four.

The stop attracted a small settlement; an 1887 history notes that Hazelrigg Station had been "a stopping and shipping point of some note for the last twenty years" and possessed a store, public hall, blacksmith, and residences. It also had a post office, established 10 September 1873, with James Driskill serving as its first post master.

Later identified simply as Hazelrigg, the town in the early 20th century had a church, school, and roughly 20 lots.; a 1914 history notes that it was "a stopping and shipping point of some note since its inception." The town had at some point a small grocery.

As of 1918, C. S. Byers, a poultry breeder specializing in buff, white and black Orpington chickens, was based in Hazelrigg.

The post office closed in 1935. On 11 April 1965 during the Palm Sunday tornado outbreak a tornado caused considerable damage to Hazelrigg and nearby areas of Boone County, with Indiana Governor Roger Branigin arriving to survey the destruction.

The town has a grain elevator but otherwise is entirely residential.

== Geography ==
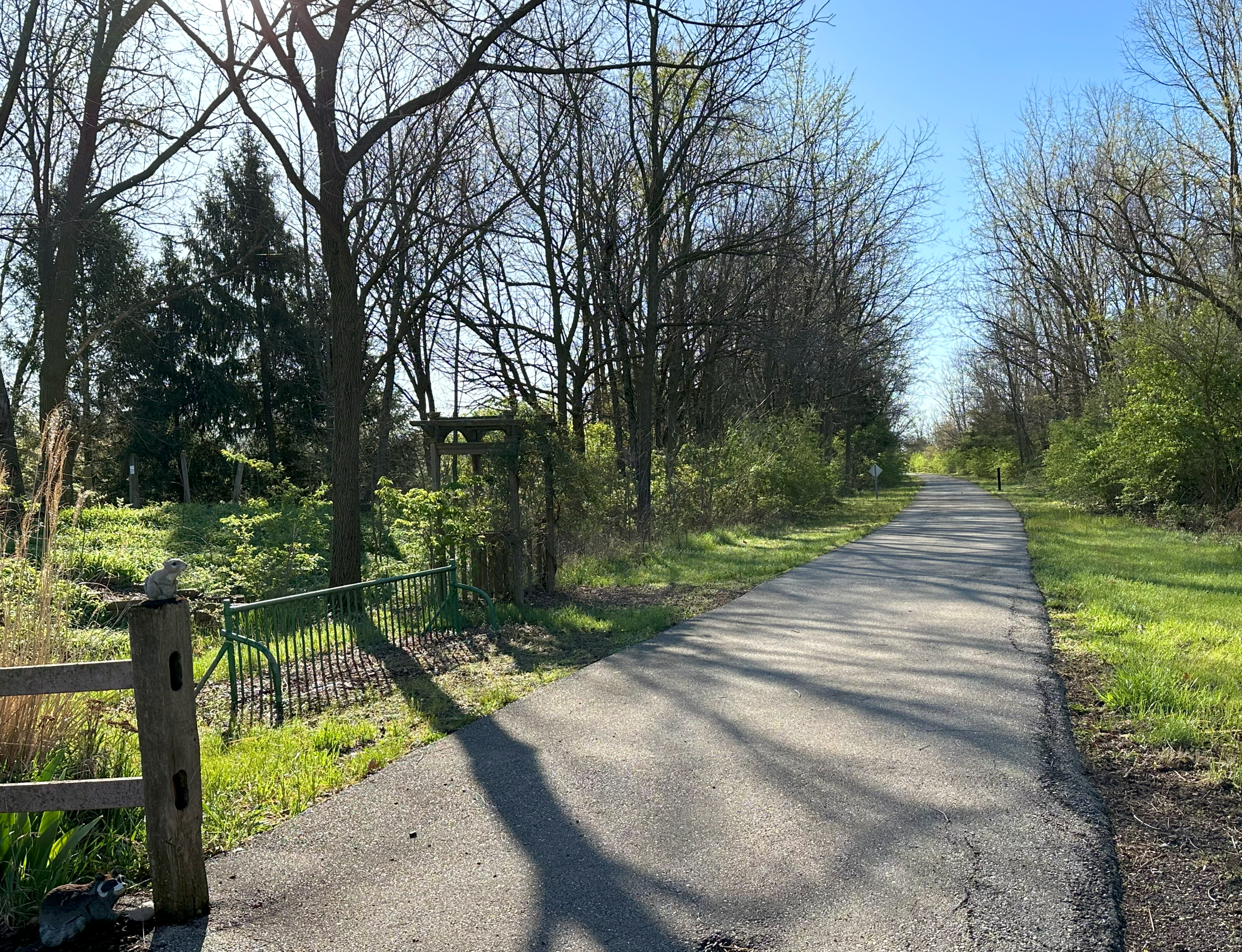
The Big 4 Trail in Hazelrigg

Hazelrigg is located at 40°04′56″N 86°33′47″W near the intersection of Boone County roads 300 North (Hazelrigg Road) and 500 West. Surrounded mostly by open farmland, the location is about three miles west of U.S. Route 52 and Interstate 65, about four miles southeast of Thorntown, and about five miles northwest of the city of Lebanon.

The Big 4 Trail (previously the Farm Heritage Trail) which passes along with southwest side of Hazelrigg stretches south to Lebanon and north to Colfax in Tippecanoe County along the path of the defunct railroad.

== Gallery ==
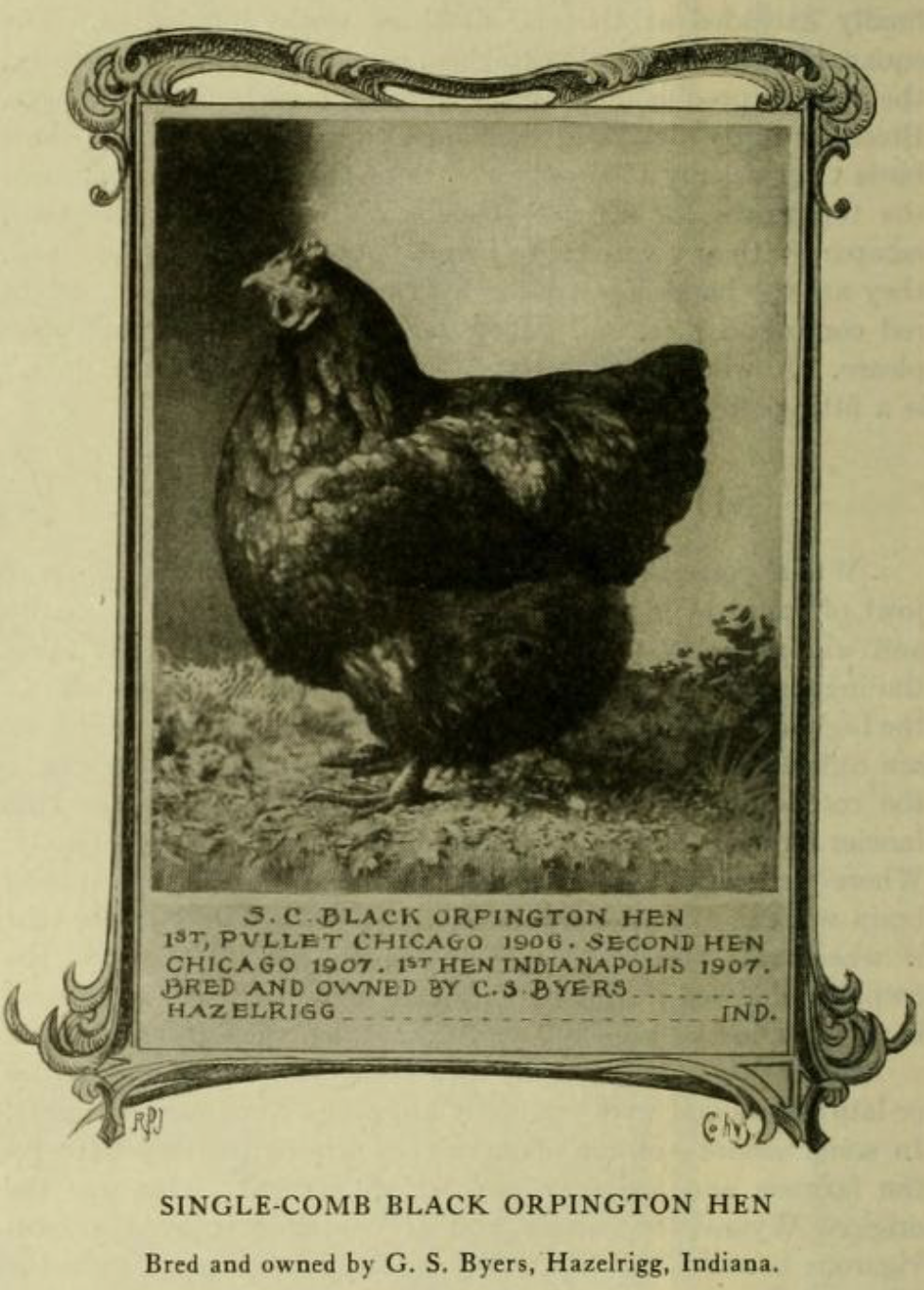
Black Orpington hen owned and bred by C. S. Byers in Hazelrigg
