= Dover, Boone County, Indiana =

Dover
- Unincorporated community
- Location within Boone County, Indiana
- Coordinates: 40°03′16″N 86°37′12″W
- Country: United States
- State: Indiana
- County: Boone
- Township: Jefferson
- Elevation: 899 ft (274 m)
- Time zone: UTC-5 (Eastern (EST))
  - Summer (DST): UTC-4 (EDT)
- ZIP code: 46071
- Area code: 765
- GNIS feature ID: 433658

Dover is an unincorporated community in Jefferson Township, Boone County, in the U.S. state of Indiana. It is located at the intersection of IN 32 and IN 75, about 7 miles west of Lebanon.

== History ==
A post office was established at Dover in 1860, and remained in operation until it was discontinued in 1872.
