= Pickard, Indiana =

Pickard
- Unincorporated community
- Location within Clinton County, Indiana
- Coordinates: 40°13′23″N 86°15′41″W
- Country: United States
- State: Indiana
- County: Clinton
- Township: Sugar Creek
- Named for: Jacob Pickard
- Elevation: 929 ft (283 m)
- Time zone: UTC-5 (Eastern)
  - Summer (DST): UTC-4 (Eastern)
- ZIP code: 46050, 46069
- FIPS code: 18-59544
- GNIS feature ID: 441098

Pickard is an unincorporated community in Sugar Creek Township, Clinton County, Indiana. The community is named for Jacob Pickard who operated a sawmill at the site.

== History ==
Jacob Pickard ran a sawmill at Pickard's Mills. It was originally operated at Jefferson in the western part of the county, but James M. Ward, Jack Hill, and Frank McMannis moved it to the new site at a town then called Hillsborough. Jacob Pickard took over the mill and the town then came to be known as Pickard's Mill. In 1851, the old mill was replaced with a steam-powered sawmill, which was also equipped with millstones for grinding wheat and corn.

James Ward laid out Pickard's Mill in 1844 (but never officially platted it) and opened the town's first store. Robert Boyer was its first blacksmith, Doctors Cooper and Williams its first physicians, and Thomas Puckit the first postmaster.

The town was known by some of the early locals as "Tailholt", and this was the name that residents requested when the post office was to be established there, but the postal authorities kept the name as Pickard's Mill. A 1913 history states that many in the area believed the town to be the inspiration for James Whitcomb Riley's poem "The Little Town o' Tailholt", though the true source was the town of Tailholt (later Finly) in Hancock County.
