= List of public art in Boone County, Indiana =

This is a list of public art in Boone County, Indiana.

This list applies only to works of public art accessible in an outdoor public space. For example, this does not include artwork visible inside a museum.

Most of the works mentioned are sculptures. When this is not the case (e.g., sound installation,) it is stated next to the title.

== Lebanon ==
Title	Artist	Year	Location/GPS Coordinates	Material	Dimensions	Owner	Image
Boone County Courthouse	Joseph T. Hutton	1912	Boone County Courthouse	Limestone	4 relief sculptures. Each pediment sculpture: approx. 12 x 36 1/2 x 2 ft.; Each Justice sculpture: approx. 8 x 3 x 1 1/2 ft.	Boone County Commissioners	

== Zionsville ==
Title	Artist	Year	Location/GPS Coordinates	Material	Dimensions	Owner	Image
Christ in Garden of Gethsemane	Domenic Zappia	ca. 1965	Lincoln Memory Gardens	Marble	Sculpture: approx. 5 ft. 3 in. x 2 ft. x 5 ft.	Memory Gardens Management Corporation	
Christus	Domenic Zappia	ca. 1965	Lincoln Memory Gardens	Marble	Figure: approx. 86 x 55 x 17 in.	Memory Gardens Management Corporation	
Hamilton County Civil War Monument	Jackson and Holloway, fabricator	1869	Crownland Cemetery	Marble	Sculpture: approx. 20 x 6 x 6 ft.	Crownland Cemetery	
Jesus and the Woman at the Well	Guido Orlandi	ca. 1965	Lincoln Memory Gardens	Marble	Sculpture: approx. 84 x 68 x 40 in.	Memory Gardens Management Corporation	
The Last Supper	Guido Orlandi	ca. 1965	Lincoln Memory Gardens	Marble	Relief: approx. 50 x 112 x 10 in.	Memory Gardens Management Corporation	
Sermon on the Mount	Domenic Zappia	ca. 1965	Lincoln Memory Gardens	Marble	Figure: approx. 63 x 30 x 36 in.	Memory Gardens Management Corporation	
Veterans Memorial		1974	Lincoln Memory Gardens	Marble	6 units. Air Force sculpture: approx. 81 x 21 x 15 in.; Army nurse sculpture: approx. 75 x 18 x 14 in.	Memory Gardens Management Corporation	
