= New Brunswick, Indiana =

- Unincorporated community
- Boone County's location in Indiana

- Location in Boone County
- Coordinates: 39°56′39″N 86°31′22″W
- Country: United States
- State: Indiana
- County: Boone
- Township: Harrison
- Elevation: 955 ft (291 m)
- Time zone: UTC-5 (Eastern (EST))
  - Summer (DST): UTC-4 (EDT)
- ZIP code: 46052
- Area code: 765
- FIPS code: 18-52614
- GNIS feature ID: 440028

New Brunswick is an unincorporated community in Harrison Township, Boone County, in the U.S. state of Indiana.

== History ==
New Brunswick was laid out in 1850. A post office was established at New Brunswick in 1858, and remained in operation until it was discontinued in 1901.

== Geography ==
New Brunswick is located at 39°56′39″N 86°31′22″W.
