= Elizaville, Indiana =

- Unincorporated community and Census-designated place
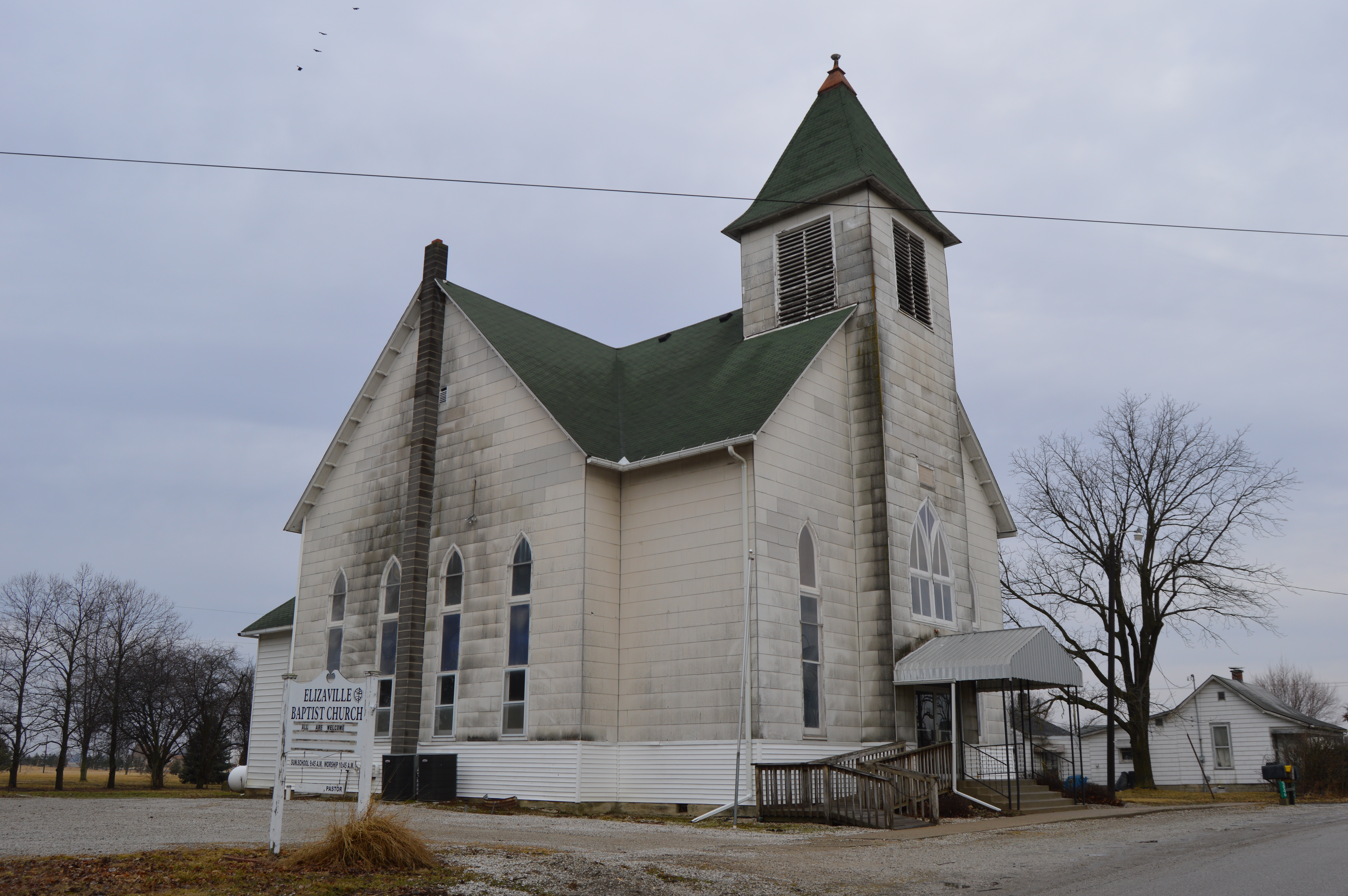
- Elizaville Baptist Church

- Boone County's location in Indiana

- Location in Boone County
- Coordinates: 40°07′36″N 86°22′33″W
- Country: United States
- State: Indiana
- County: Boone
- Township: Clinton
- Elevation: 925 ft (282 m)
- Time zone: UTC-5 (Eastern (EST))
  - Summer (DST): UTC-4 (EDT)
- ZIP code: 46052
- Area code: 765
- FIPS code: 18-20710
- GNIS feature ID: 2830322

Elizaville is an unincorporated community in Clinton Township, Boone County, in the U.S. state of Indiana.

== History ==
A post office was established at Elizaville in 1855, and remained in operation until it was discontinued in 1907. The Elizaville Church was used for a scene in the 1986 film Hoosiers.

== Demographics ==
The United States Census Bureau first delineated Elizaville as a census designated place in the 2022 American Community Survey.
