= Stringtown, Boone County, Indiana =

Lebanon
- Lebanon Economic Development Corporation
- Boone County's location in Indiana

- Location in Boone County
- Coordinates: 40°04′54″N 86°28′36″W
- Country: United States
- State: Indiana
- County: Boone
- Township: Center
- Elevation: 938 ft (286 m)
- Time zone: UTC-5 (Eastern (EST))
  - Summer (DST): UTC-4 (EDT)
- ZIP code: 46052
- Area code: 765
- FIPS code: 18-73700
- GNIS feature ID: 444272

Stringtown is an unincorporated community in Center Township, Boone County, in the U.S. state of Indiana.

== History ==
Stringtown was a name that was frequently applied in the United States to small, unincorporated settlements that consisted of only a small row (or a string) of buildings that lacked a town centre. This village may have originally been named Keys Ferry after its founder. This community is one of seven in Indiana named Stringtown.

== Geography ==
Stringtown is located at 40°16′54″N 86°32′36″W.
