= Northfield, Indiana =

- Unincorporated community
- Boone County's location in Indiana

- Location in Boone County
- Coordinates: 40°01′51″N 86°16′49″W
- Country: United States
- State: Indiana
- County: Boone
- Township: Union
- Established: 1834
- Founder: Jesse Lane
- Elevation: 902 ft (275 m)
- Time zone: UTC-5 (Eastern (EST))
  - Summer (DST): UTC-4 (EDT)
- ZIP code: 46077
- FIPS code: 18-54702
- GNIS feature ID: 440326

Northfield is an unincorporated community in Union Township, Boone County, in the U.S. state of Indiana.

== History ==
Northfield was laid out in 1834 by a settler named Jesse Lane. A post office was established at Northfield in 1834, and remained in operation until it was discontinued in 1897.

== Geography ==
Northfield is located at 40°01′51″N 86°16′49″W.
