= Washington Township, Boone County, Indiana =

Washington Township
- Township
- Location of Washington Township in Boone County
- Coordinates: 40°07′52″N 86°31′36″W
- Country: United States
- State: Indiana
- County: Boone

Government
  - Type: Indiana township

Area
  - Total: 35.58 sq mi (92.2 km^{2})
  - Land: 35.44 sq mi (91.8 km^{2})
  - Water: 0.14 sq mi (0.36 km^{2})
- Elevation: 889 ft (271 m)

Population (2020)
  - Total: 1,399
  - Density: 39.4/sq mi (15.2/km^{2})
- FIPS code: 18-80378
- GNIS feature ID: 453983

Washington Township is one of twelve townships in Boone County, Indiana. As of the 2010 census, its population was 1,398 and it contained 547 housing units.

== Geography ==
According to the 2010 census, the township has a total area of 35.58 square miles (92.2 km^{2}), of which 35.44 square miles (91.8 km^{2}) (or 99.61%) is land and 0.14 square miles (0.36 km^{2}) (or 0.39%) is water.

=== Unincorporated towns ===
- Mechanicsburg
- Pike

=== Adjacent townships ===
- Center (southeast)
- Clinton (east)
- Jefferson (southwest)
- Sugar Creek (west)
- Jackson Township, Clinton County (north)
- Perry Township, Clinton County (northwest)

=== Major highways ===
- Interstate 65
- U.S. Route 52
- Indiana State Road 39
- Indiana State Road 47
