= Shannondale, Indiana =

- Unincorporated community
- Shannondale, as seen in a map of Montgomery County
- Coordinates: 40°03′17″N 86°41′44″W
- Country: United States
- State: Indiana
- County: Montgomery, Boone
- Township: Franklin, Jefferson
- Elevation: 860 ft (260 m)
- Time zone: UTC-5 (Eastern (EST))
  - Summer (DST): UTC-4 (EDT)
- ZIP code: 46071
- Area code: 765
- FIPS code: 18-68994
- GNIS feature ID: 443286

Shannondale is an unincorporated community in Montgomery and Boone counties, in the U.S. state of Indiana.

== History ==
Shannondale was platted by Isaiah Lame and George Woods in 1851. Nathan Shannon was an early postmaster. A post office was established at Shannondale in 1852, and remained in operation until it was discontinued in 1909.
