= Boone County, Indiana =

County in Indiana, United States

- County
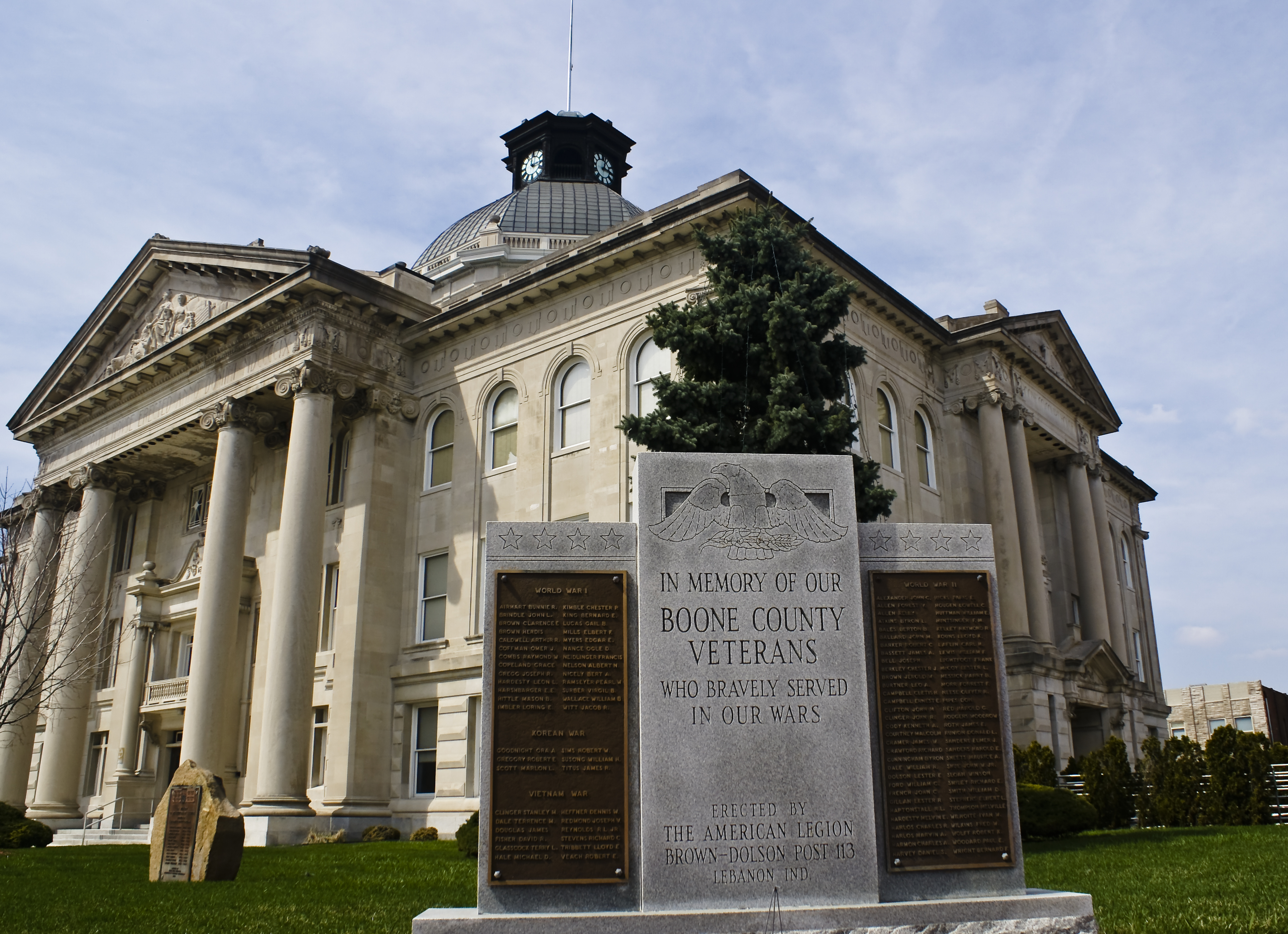
- Boone County Courthouse in Lebanon

- Logo

- Location within the U.S. state of Indiana
- Coordinates: 40°03′N 86°28′W
- Country: United States
- State: Indiana
- Founded: April 1, 1830 (created); 1831 (organized)
- Named for: Daniel Boone
- Seat: Lebanon
- Largest city: Zionsville

Area
  - Total: 423.25 sq mi (1,096.2 km^{2})
  - Land: 422.91 sq mi (1,095.3 km^{2})
  - Water: 0.34 sq mi (0.88 km^{2}) 0.08%

Population (2020)
  - Total: 70,812
  - Estimate (2025): 80,689 ▲
  - Density: 167.44/sq mi (64.649/km^{2})
- Congressional districts: 4th, 5th
- Website: boonecounty.in.gov
- Indiana county number 6

Boone County is a county in the U.S. state of Indiana. As of 2020, the population was 70,812. The county seat is Lebanon.

== History ==
In 1787, the fledgling United States defined the Northwest Territory, which included the area of present-day Indiana. In 1800, Congress separated Ohio from the Northwest Territory, designating the rest of the land as the Indiana Territory. President Thomas Jefferson chose William Henry Harrison as the territory's first governor, and Vincennes was established as the territorial capital. After the Michigan Territory was separated and the Illinois Territory was formed, Indiana was reduced to its current size and geography. By December 1816 the Indiana Territory was admitted to the Union as a state.

Starting in 1794, Native American titles to Indiana lands were extinguished by usurpation, purchase, or war and treaty. The United States acquired land from the Native Americans in the 1809 treaty of Fort Wayne, and by the treaty of St. Mary's in 1818 considerably more territory became property of the government. This included the future Boone County, designating areas covered by the Delaware New Purchase.

Boone County was created by the state legislature on April 1, 1830, with Jamestown (which had been first settled that year) named as the initial county seat. The county was named for frontiersman Daniel Boone. The interim county commissioners met on May 1 of the following year to identify a permanent seat of government, which by law had to be within 2 miles (3.2 km) of the county's center; the [future] city of Lebanon was selected to serve this purpose.

== Geography ==
Boone County lies near the center of the state. It is 24 miles (39 km) from east to west and 17.5 miles (28.2 km) from north to south. It contains about 418.5 square miles (108,500 hectares), two-thirds of which is in cultivation. Its central position, excellent soil, and available water power have been in its favor. The highest point of the county (984 feet (300 meters) ASL) is a small hill two miles/3.2 km northeast of Lebanon. The upper part of the county is drained by Sugar Creek, flowing westward into Montgomery County; the southwest part of the county is drained by Big Raccoon Creek, also flowing west-southwestward into Montgomery. The southeast part of the county is drained by Eagle Creek and its tributaries, flowing southward into Marion County.

According to the 2010 census, the county has a total area of 423.25 square miles (1,096.2 km^{2}), of which 422.91 square miles (1,095.3 km^{2}) (or 99.92%) is land and 0.34 square miles (0.88 km^{2}) (or 0.08%) is water.

=== Adjacent counties ===
- Clinton County − north
- Hamilton County − east
- Marion County − southeast
- Hendricks County − south
- Montgomery County − west

=== Cities ===
- Lebanon - county seat

=== Towns ===
- Advance
- Jamestown
- Thorntown
- Ulen
- Whitestown
- Zionsville

=== Unincorporated communities ===
- Big Springs
- Brendan Wood
- Dover
- Eagle Village
- Eaglewood Estates
- Elizaville
- Fayette
- Fox Hollow
- Gadsden
- Hazel College
- Hazelrigg
- Max
- Mechanicsburg
- Milledgeville
- New Brunswick
- Northfield
- Northfield Village
- Pike
- Rosston
- Royalton
- Russell Lake
- Shannondale (partial)
- Stringtown
- Terhune
- The Woodlands
- Ward
- Waugh

=== Townships ===
- Center
- Clinton
- Eagle
- Harrison
- Jackson
- Jefferson
- Marion
- Perry
- Sugar Creek
- Union
- Washington
- Worth

=== Transit ===
- Central Indiana Regional Transportation Authority

=== Major highways ===
- Interstate 65
- Interstate 74
- Interstate 465
- Interstate 865
- U.S. Route 52
- U.S. Route 136
- U.S. Route 421
- Indiana State Road 32
- Indiana State Road 38
- Indiana State Road 39
- Indiana State Road 47
- Indiana State Road 75
- Indiana State Road 234
- Indiana State Road 267

=== Airport ===
- KTYQ - Indianapolis Executive Airport

=== Railroads ===
- CSX Transportation

== Education ==
Public schools in Boone County are administered by the Lebanon Community School Corporation, Western Boone County Community School District, Zionsville Community Schools, and Sheridan Community Schools.

== Climate and weather ==
Lebanon, Indiana

Climate chart (precipitation, max. and min. temperature)
J	F	M	A	M	J	J	A	S	O	N	D
2.4 34 18	2.4 41 22	3.4 52 31	3.8 65 40	4.5 75 50	4.2 84 60	4.5 86 63	3.6 85 61	3 79 53	2.9 67 43	3.7 52 34	3.1 39 23
- █ Average max. and min. temperatures in °F
- █ Precipitation totals in inches
- Source: The Weather Channel
Metric conversion
J	F	M	A	M	J	J	A	S	O	N	D
62 1 −8	60 5 −6	86 11 −1	97 18 4	114 24 10	105 29 16	115 30 17	90 29 16	76 26 12	73 19 6	94 11 1	78 4 −5
- █ Average max. and min. temperatures in °C
- █ Precipitation totals in mm

In recent years, average temperatures in Lebanon have ranged from a low of 18 °F (−8 °C) in January to a high of 86 °F (30 °C) in July, although a record low of −27 °F (−33 °C) was recorded in January 1994 and a record high of 112 °F (44 °C) was recorded in July 1936. Average monthly precipitation ranged from 2.35 inches (60 mm) in February to 4.54 inches (115 mm) in July.

== Government ==
The county government is a constitutional body, and is granted specific powers by the Constitution of Indiana, and by the Indiana Code.

County Council: The legislative branch of the county's government; controls and revenue collection in the county. Representatives are elected to four-year terms from county districts. They set salaries, the annual budget, and special spending. The council has limited authority to impose local taxes, in the form of an income and property tax that is subject to state level approval, excise taxes, and service taxes.

Board of Commissioners: The executive body of the county; commissioners are elected county-wide to staggered four-year terms. One commissioner serves as president. The commissioners execute acts legislated by the council, collect revenue, and manage the county government.

Court: The county maintains a small claims court that handles civil cases. The judge on the court is elected to a term of four years and must be a member of the Indiana Bar Association. The judge is assisted by a constable who is also elected to a four-year term. In some cases, court decisions can be appealed to the state level circuit court.

County Officials: The county has other elected offices, including sheriff, coroner, auditor, treasurer, recorder, surveyor, and circuit court clerk. They are elected to four-year terms. Members elected to county government positions are required to declare a party affiliation and to be residents of the county.

Boone County is part of Indiana's 4th and 5th congressional districts, Indiana Senate districts 21 and 23, and Indiana House of Representatives districts 28, 38 and 87.

=== Politics ===
Prior to 1940, Boone County was a Democratic-leaning swing county in presidential elections, backing the national winner in every election from 1912 to 1936. From 1940 on, it has become a Republican stronghold. In 2024, Vice President Kamala Harris became the first Democratic presidential candidate since Lyndon B. Johnson to win a share of over forty percent of the vote.

United States presidential election results for Boone County, Indiana
Year	Republican		Democratic		Third party(ies)	
Year	No.	%	No.	%	No.	%
1888	3,441	48.95%	3,324	47.29%	264	3.76%
1892	3,136	46.82%	3,104	46.34%	458	6.84%
1896	3,449	47.23%	3,800	52.03%	54	0.74%
1900	3,360	46.46%	3,718	51.41%	154	2.13%
1904	3,633	50.20%	3,263	45.09%	341	4.71%
1908	3,471	48.22%	3,525	48.97%	202	2.81%
1912	1,181	17.55%	3,280	48.74%	2,269	33.71%
1916	3,333	46.97%	3,513	49.51%	250	3.52%
1920	6,650	50.93%	6,178	47.31%	230	1.76%
1924	6,256	52.57%	5,466	45.93%	178	1.50%
1928	6,556	58.81%	4,500	40.37%	91	0.82%
1932	5,309	42.68%	6,900	55.47%	231	1.86%
1936	5,739	45.57%	6,775	53.80%	79	0.63%
1940	7,066	53.26%	6,152	46.37%	49	0.37%
1944	6,823	56.00%	5,292	43.43%	70	0.57%
1948	6,450	55.67%	5,037	43.47%	99	0.85%
1952	8,619	63.04%	4,986	36.47%	68	0.50%
1956	8,573	61.56%	5,318	38.19%	35	0.25%
1960	8,979	62.28%	5,377	37.30%	60	0.42%
1964	7,419	52.32%	6,716	47.36%	46	0.32%
1968	7,905	58.96%	4,118	30.72%	1,384	10.32%
1972	9,874	75.10%	3,235	24.61%	38	0.29%
1976	9,214	61.48%	5,686	37.94%	86	0.57%
1980	10,484	66.11%	4,535	28.60%	840	5.30%
1984	11,790	74.38%	3,982	25.12%	78	0.49%
1988	11,608	73.44%	4,168	26.37%	30	0.19%
1992	9,485	54.64%	3,982	22.94%	3,891	22.42%
1996	11,338	64.44%	4,625	26.28%	1,633	9.28%
2000	13,161	71.54%	4,763	25.89%	472	2.57%
2004	17,055	74.48%	5,636	24.61%	207	0.90%
2008	16,622	62.27%	9,752	36.54%	318	1.19%
2012	18,808	67.70%	8,328	29.98%	646	2.33%
2016	19,654	60.41%	10,181	31.29%	2,702	8.30%
2020	22,351	57.80%	15,244	39.42%	1,073	2.77%
2024	22,840	56.70%	16,426	40.78%	1,017	2.52%

== Demographics ==
Historical population
Census	Pop.	Note	%±
1830	621		—
1840	8,121		1,207.7%
1850	11,631		43.2%
1860	16,753		44.0%
1870	22,593		34.9%
1880	25,922		14.7%
1890	26,572		2.5%
1900	26,321		−0.9%
1910	24,673		−6.3%
1920	23,575		−4.5%
1930	22,290		−5.5%
1940	22,081		−0.9%
1950	23,993		8.7%
1960	27,543		14.8%
1970	30,870		12.1%
1980	36,446		18.1%
1990	38,147		4.7%
2000	46,107		20.9%
2010	56,640		22.8%
2020	70,812		25.0%
2025 (est.)	80,689	▲	13.9%
US Decennial Census; 1790-1960 1900-1990; 1990-2000 2010

=== Racial and ethnic composition ===
Boone County, Indiana – Racial and ethnic composition Note: the US Census treats Hispanic/Latino as an ethnic category. This table excludes Latinos from the racial categories and assigns them to a separate category. Hispanics/Latinos may be of any race.
Race / Ethnicity (NH = Non-Hispanic)	Pop 1980	Pop 1990	Pop 2000	Pop 2010	Pop 2020	% 1980	% 1990	% 2000	% 2010	% 2020
White alone (NH)	36,037	37,628	44,847	53,151	61,135	98.88%	98.64%	97.27%	93.84%	86.33%
Black or African American alone (NH)	45	83	157	484	1,426	0.12%	0.22%	0.34%	0.85%	2.01%
Native American or Alaska Native alone (NH)	59	86	99	91	128	0.16%	0.23%	0.21%	0.16%	0.18%
Asian alone (NH)	64	94	210	941	2,389	0.18%	0.25%	0.46%	1.66%	3.37%
Native Hawaiian or Pacific Islander alone (NH)	x	x	5	10	19	x	x	0.01%	0.02%	0.03%
Other race alone (NH)	16	6	18	35	241	0.04%	0.02%	0.04%	0.06%	0.34%
Mixed race or Multiracial (NH)	x	x	237	658	2,699	x	x	0.51%	1.16%	3.81%
Hispanic or Latino (any race)	225	250	534	1,270	2,775	0.62%	0.66%	1.16%	2.24%	3.92%
Total	36,446	38,147	46,107	56,640	70,812	100.00%	100.00%	100.00%	100.00%	100.00%

=== 2020 census ===
As of the 2020 census, the county had a population of 70,812.

The median age was 38.7 years. 26.5% of residents were under the age of 18 and 14.8% of residents were 65 years of age or older. For every 100 females there were 97.8 males, and for every 100 females age 18 and over there were 94.0 males age 18 and over.

The racial makeup of the county was 87.3% White, 2.0% Black or African American, 0.2% American Indian and Alaska Native, 3.4% Asian, <0.1% Native Hawaiian and Pacific Islander, 1.2% from some other race, and 5.8% from two or more races. Hispanic or Latino residents of any race comprised 3.9% of the population.

72.8% of residents lived in urban areas, while 27.2% lived in rural areas.

There were 26,593 households in the county, of which 36.3% had children under the age of 18 living in them. Of all households, 59.5% were married-couple households, 14.1% were households with a male householder and no spouse or partner present, and 20.5% were households with a female householder and no spouse or partner present. About 23.2% of all households were made up of individuals and 9.6% had someone living alone who was 65 years of age or older.

There were 28,103 housing units, of which 5.4% were vacant. Among occupied housing units, 76.3% were owner-occupied and 23.7% were renter-occupied. The homeowner vacancy rate was 1.1% and the rental vacancy rate was 7.2%.

=== 2010 census ===
As of the 2010 United States census, there were 56,640 people, 21,149 households, and 15,509 families in the county. The population density was 133.9 inhabitants per square mile (51.7/km^{2}). There were 22,754 housing units at an average density of 53.8 per square mile (20.8/km^{2}). The racial makeup of the county was 95.3% white, 1.7% Asian, 0.9% black or African American, 0.2% American Indian, 0.7% from other races, and 1.4% from two or more races. Those of Hispanic or Latino origin made up 2.2% of the population. In terms of ancestry, 28.9% were German, 19.3% were English, 14.1% were Irish, and 9.0% were American.

Of the 21,149 households, 38.8% had children under the age of 18 living with them, 61.1% were married couples living together, 8.4% had a female householder with no husband present, 26.7% were non-families, and 22.4% of all households were made up of individuals. The average household size was 2.65 and the average family size was 3.12. The median age was 38.6 years.

The median income for a household in the county was $47,697 and the median income for a family was $81,401. Males had a median income of $57,251 versus $41,309 for females. The per capita income for the county was $38,696. About 6.1% of families and 7.1% of the population were below the poverty line, including 8.6% of those under age 18 and 5.6% of those age 65 or over.

== See also ==
- List of public art in Boone County, Indiana
- National Register of Historic Places listings in Boone County, Indiana
