= Eagletown, Indiana =

- Unincorporated community
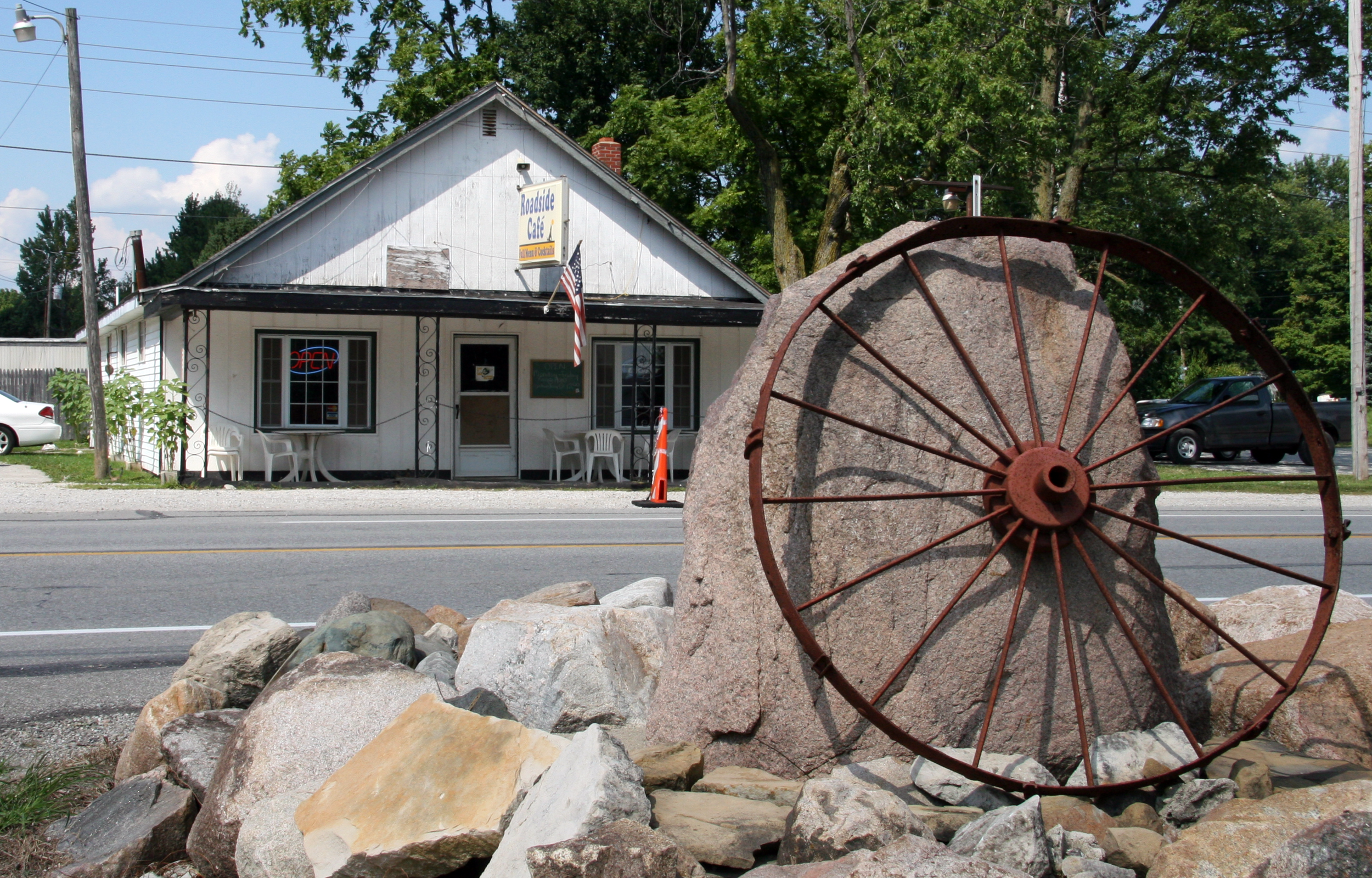

- Location within Indiana Location within the United States
- Coordinates: 40°02′32″N 86°11′37″W
- Country: United States
- State: Indiana
- County: Hamilton
- Township: Westfield Washington
- Platted: 1848
- Elevation: 902 ft (275 m)
- ZIP code: 46074
- GNIS feature ID: 433857

Eagletown is an unincorporated community in Westfield Washington Township, Hamilton County, Indiana.

Eagletown was laid out in 1848. It took its name from the Little Eagle Creek. A post office was established at Eagletown in 1849, and remained in operation until it was discontinued in 1925.

The largest architectural feature of the town is Eagletown Estates, a 38-lot mobile home park. Lawyer and congressional candidate Nels Ackerson was born in Eagletown, and in 2006 with his sister Karen Ackerson Jamesen announced plans for "...a 1900s-themed, master-planned community with a mix of 1,125 houses, townhouses, condos and apartments and up to 1.5 million square feet of retailing, restaurants, office and business buildings..." on their former family farm.

Musician Josh "The Reverend" Peyton of the country blues band The Reverend Peyton's Big Damn Band was born in Eagletown.

== Geography ==
Eagletown is located on Indiana State Road 32 just east of Jolietville and roughly between two small airports, the Indianapolis Executive Airport and the Westfield Airport.
