= Max, Indiana =

- Unincorporated community
- Boone County's location in Indiana

- Location in Boone County
- Coordinates: 40°00′37″N 86°34′55″W
- Country: United States
- State: Indiana
- County: Boone
- Township: Jefferson
- Elevation: 925 ft (282 m)
- Time zone: UTC-5 (Eastern (EST))
  - Summer (DST): UTC-4 (EDT)
- ZIP code: 46052
- Area code: 765
- FIPS code: 18-47682
- GNIS feature ID: 438745

Max is an unincorporated community in Jefferson Township, Boone County, in the U.S. state of Indiana.

== History ==
A post office was established at Max in 1886, and remained in operation until it was discontinued in 1907.

== Geography ==
Max is located at 40°00′37″N 86°34′55″W.
