= Sugarcreek Township =

Sugarcreek Township may refer to:

- Sugarcreek Township, Greene County, Ohio
- Sugarcreek Township, Pennsylvania

== See also ==
- Sugar Creek Township (disambiguation)
