= Perry Township, Boone County, Indiana =

Perry Township
- Township
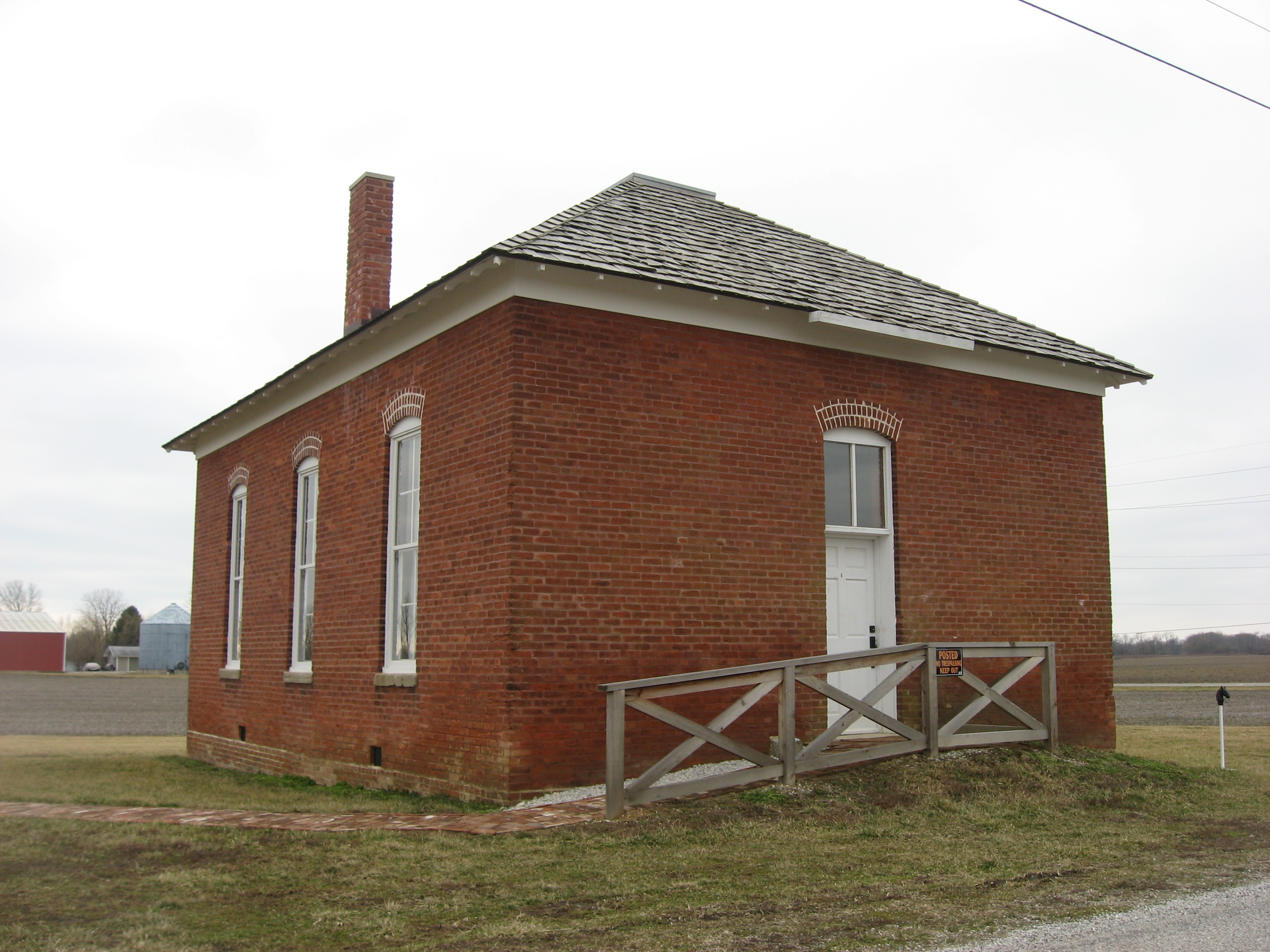
- Former Howard School in eastern Perry Township

- Location of Perry Township in Boone County
- Coordinates: 39°56′57″N 86°24′28″W
- Country: United States
- State: Indiana
- County: Boone

Government
  - Type: Indiana township

Area
  - Total: 20.84 sq mi (54.0 km^{2})
  - Land: 20.82 sq mi (53.9 km^{2})
  - Water: 0.02 sq mi (0.052 km^{2})
- Elevation: 948 ft (289 m)

Population (2020)
  - Total: 820
  - Density: 55.8/sq mi (21.5/km^{2})
- FIPS code: 18-58968
- GNIS feature ID: 453716

Perry Township is one of twelve townships in Boone County, Indiana. As of the 2010 census, its population was 1,163 and it contained 461 housing units.

== History ==
Howard School was listed on the National Register of Historic Places in 2009.

== Geography ==
According to the 2010 census, the township has a total area of 20.84 square miles (54.0 km^{2}), of which 20.82 square miles (53.9 km^{2}) (or 99.90%) is land and 0.02 square miles (0.052 km^{2}) (or 0.10%) is water.

=== Municipalities ===
- Whitestown (partial)
- Zionsville (small portion)

=== Unincorporated communities ===
- Fayette
- Herr at 39.952522°N 86.431786°W

=== Adjacent townships ===
- Center (northwest)
- Eagle (east)
- Harrison (west)
- Worth (northeast)
- Brown Township, Hendricks County (southeast)
- Middle Township, Hendricks County (southwest)

=== Major highways ===
- Interstate 65
- Indiana State Road 267

=== Cemeteries ===
The township contains three cemeteries: Dickerson, Howard and Smith.
