= Sugar Creek (Minnesota) =

Stream in Fillmore County, Minnesota, U.S.

Coordinates: 43°45′28″N 92°09′12″W

Sugar Creek is a stream in Fillmore County, in the U.S. state of Minnesota.

Sugar Creek was named for the sugar maple trees lining its banks.

== See also ==
- List of rivers of Minnesota
