= Rosston, Indiana =

- Unincorporated community
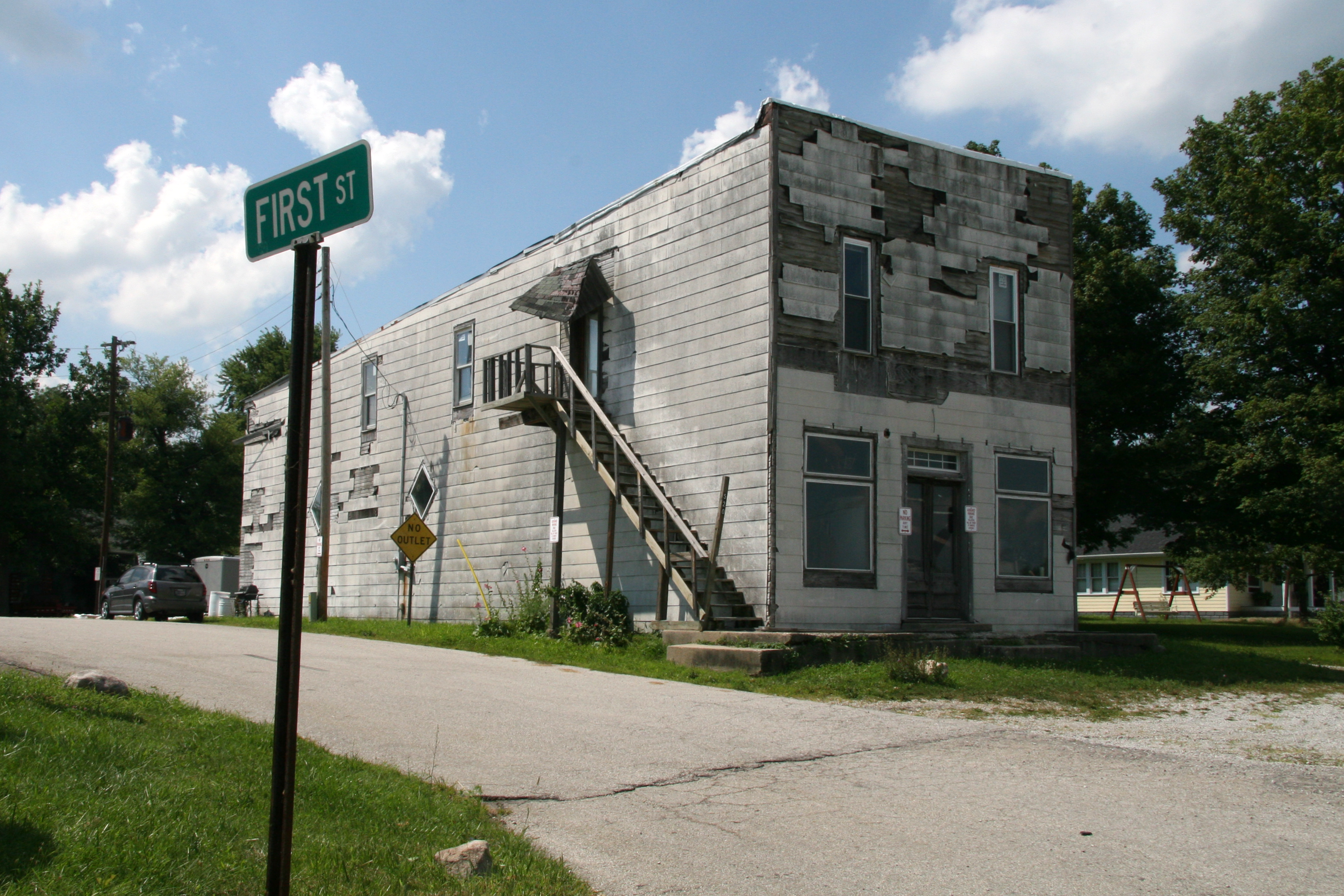
- A building in Rosston

- Boone County's location in Indiana

- Location in Boone County
- Coordinates: 40°02′55″N 86°17′21″W
- Country: United States
- State: Indiana
- County: Boone
- Township: Union
- Elevation: 932 ft (284 m)
- Time zone: UTC-5 (Eastern (EST))
  - Summer (DST): UTC-4 (EDT)
- ZIP code: 46077
- FIPS code: 18-66114
- GNIS feature ID: 442327

Rosston is an unincorporated community in Union Township, Boone County, in the U.S. state of Indiana.

== History ==
A post office was established at Rosston in 1886, and remained in operation until it was discontinued in 1918. Ross was the name of the original owners of the townsite.

== Geography ==
Rosston is located at 40°02′55″N 86°17′21″W.
