= Nels Ackerson =

American lawyer (1944–2025)

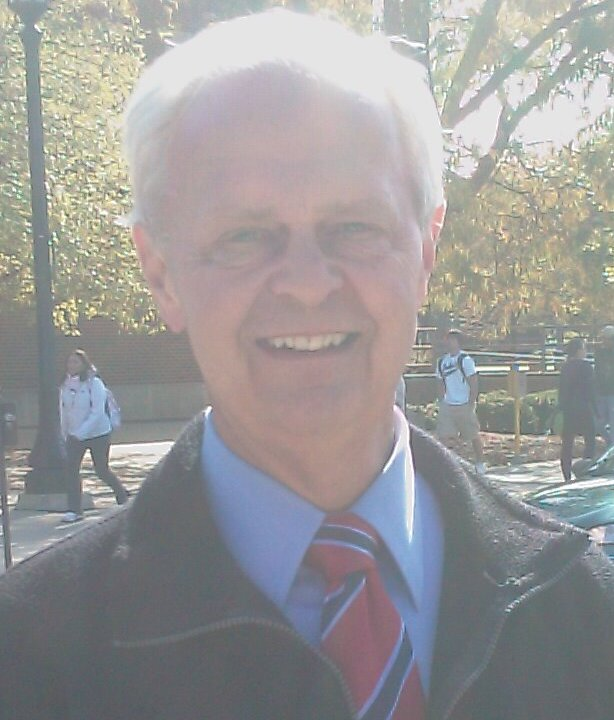
- Ackerson campaigns at Purdue University in Indiana.

Personal details
- Born: April 12, 1944 Eagletown, Indiana, U.S.
- Died: March 18, 2025 (aged 80) West Lafayette, Indiana, U.S.
- Party: Democratic
- Spouse: Sharon Carroll
- Children: 4
- Education: Purdue University; Harvard Law School; Harvard Kennedy School
- Occupation: attorney
- Website: www.nels4congress.com

Nels Ackerson (April 12, 1944 – March 18, 2025) was an American lawyer and head of the law firm that bears his name, based in Washington, D.C. He represented clients in 46 states and 16 countries on issues involving property rights, constitutional rights, agriculture, eminent domain, commercial and financial disputes, public policy, and international disputes. His law practice included individual cases, class actions, mediation, appellate advocacy in state and federal courts, regulatory disputes, testimony before congressional committees and state legislatures, and international arbitration.

Ackerson received Martindale-Hubbell's highest rating – AV Premier – for legal ability and ethics. He was identified by his peers as a Super Lawyer and is listed in the American Registry, the Worldwide Registry, and Who's Who in the World. He was a member of the bar of the United States Supreme Court, numerous federal courts, the District of Columbia and his home state of Indiana, and was a member of the American Bar Association, the American Association for Justice, the International Society of Barristers, and other bar associations. His public positions included Chief Counsel of the U.S. Senate Subcommittee on the Constitution, nominee for the U.S. Congress, and representing the United States on trade and advisory missions to the Middle East, Africa and Eastern Europe. He organized and managed the first American law office in Egypt, and was a founder and president of the American Chamber of Commerce in Egypt. Purdue University recognized Ackerson as a distinguished alumnus and an "Old Master," and awarded Ackerson its honorary degree of Doctor of Agriculture, citing his "legal accomplishments that will have lasting impact on landowner rights."

== Background ==
Ackerson earned a B.S. degree with distinction in Agricultural Economics at Purdue University. During his sophomore year at Purdue, Ackerson was elected National FFA President, a full-time position that required him to take a one-year leave from his formal education. As National FFA President, Ackerson presided over the desegregation of the FFA and the New Farmers of America (NFA), a parallel youth organization for African Americans in states that had previously practiced racial segregation.

Ackerson was awarded the Juris Doctor degree with distinction by the Harvard Law School, where he was an editor of the Harvard Law Review. He also received the degree of Master in Public Policy from Harvard University.

== Career ==
After graduating from Harvard Law School in 1971, Ackerson joined the Indianapolis law firm of Barnes, Hickam, Pantzer & Boyd, where he tried cases before judges and juries in state and federal courts. In 1976, Ackerson accepted a staff position in the U.S. Senate to serve under the leadership of Indiana Senator Birch Bayh, a member of the Senate Committee on the Judiciary and Chairman of the Subcommittee on the Constitution. Ackerson held the positions of chief counsel and executive director of that subcommittee.

As chief counsel, Ackerson was a leading staff member in assisting with Senate consideration and passage of the Equal Rights Amendment. The Equal Rights Amendment would have ensured equal rights of women under all provisions of the Constitution.

Ackerson also served as Senator Bayh's advisor on agricultural policy. In that role, he proposed the first legislation passed by Congress and enacted into law to provide incentives for the production of alternatives to petroleum-based fuels. The law was co-authored on a bipartisan basis by Bayh and Republican Senator Bob Dole and is credited with much of the early success in the development and use of alternative, environmentally sound and economically beneficial fuels from biological sources. Ackerson also proposed legislation to permit universities, colleges and small businesses to obtain patents on inventions that had resulted in part from research funded by federal grants. Co-authored by Bayh and Dole, the law is known as the Bayh–Dole Act.

In 1980, he was the Democratic nominee for Indiana's 5th congressional district, where he was defeated by the long-time and widely respected Republican Congressman, Elwood Hillis.

Ackerson was a founder of the American Chamber of Commerce in Egypt.

Ackerson Kauffman Fex, his firm, was involved in cases in Federal Courts of Appeal and the U.S. Supreme Court. In 2008, he was again a Democratic nominee for congress, losing to Republican Steve Buyer in the 4th district.

Ackerson died on March 18, 2025, at the age of 80.
