= Sugar Creek (Mississippi River tributary) =

Stream in St. Louis County, Missouri, United States

Coordinates: 38.57686°N 90.46773°W

Sugar Creek is a stream in St. Louis County in the U.S. state of Missouri. It is a tributary of the Mississippi River.

Sugar Creek was so named on account of sugar maple trees near its course.

== See also ==
- List of rivers of Missouri
