= Ackerson Mountain =

Mountain in California, United States

- Location within California

Highest point
- Elevation: 5,243 ft (1,598 m)
- Coordinates: 37°50′18″N 119°52′04″W

Geography
- Location: Tuolumne County, California, U.S.
- Parent range: Sierra Nevada

Ackerson Mountain is a summit in Tuolumne County, California, in the United States. With an elevation of 5,243 feet (1,598 m), Ackerson Mountain is the 2438th highest summit in the state of California.

Ackerson Mountain was named in honor of James F. Ackerson, a figure in the California Gold Rush.
