= Cyclone, Indiana =

Cyclone
- Unincorporated community
- Location within Clinton County, Indiana
- Coordinates: 40°13′42″N 86°25′57″W
- Country: United States
- State: Indiana
- County: Clinton
- Township: Jackson
- Elevation: 922 ft (281 m)
- ZIP code: 46041
- FIPS code: 18-16516
- GNIS feature ID: 433268

Cyclone is an unincorporated community in Jackson Township, Clinton County, Indiana.

== History ==
The town's name commemorates a destructive tornado that struck the area on June 14, 1880. A 1913 county history states,

[It was] the most destructive storm that ever visited the county, either since its settlement or in traditional history. It was a genuine cyclone with a "funnel shaped cloud," which swept over a curved path of over forty miles in this and adjoining counties, leaving desolation in its wake. It was estimated to have done $200,000 damage in this county. The present town, which was located about that time as a railroad station, was in the path of the storm and was named for it.

A post office was established at Cyclone in 1883, and remained in operation until it was discontinued in 1933.
