= Ackerson Creek =

Stream in California, USA

Ackerson Creek Tributary to South Fork Tuolomne River
- Location of Ackerson Creek mouth Ackerson Creek (the United States)

Location
- Country: United States
- State: California
- County: Tuolumne

Physical characteristics
- Source: Middle Tuolumne River divide
  - location: about 2 miles northeast of Bald Mountain
  - coordinates: 37°51′05″N 119°46′04″W
  - elevation: 6,640 ft (2,020 m)
- Mouth: South Fork Tuolumne River
  - location: about 2.5 miles southwest of Ackerson Mountain
  - coordinates: 37°49′16″N 119°52′33″W
  - elevation: 4,272 ft (1,302 m)
- Length: 6.19 mi (9.96 km)
- Basin size: 11.60 square miles (30.0 km^{2})
- Discharge
  - location: South Fork Tuolumne River
  - average: 13.37 cu ft/s (0.379 m^{3}/s) at mouth with South Fork Tuolumne River

Basin features
- Progression: South Fork Tuolumne River → Tuolumne River → San Joaquin River → San Francisco Bay → Pacific Ocean
- River system: Tuolumne River
- Tributaries
  - left: unnamed tributaries
  - right: unnamed tributaries
- Bridges: Evergreen Road

Ackerson Creek is a stream in Tuolumne County, California, in the United States. It is a tributary of the South Fork Tuolumne River.

Ackerson Creek was named in honor of James F. Ackerson, a figure in the California Gold Rush.

== Variant names ==
According to the Geographic Names Information System, it has also been known historically as:

- Akerson Creek
- Big Meadow Creek

== Course ==
Ackerson Creek rises about 2 miles northeast of Bald Mountain, in Tuolumne County, California and then flows generally west-southwest to join South Fork Tuolumne River about 2.5 miles southwest of Ackerson Mountain.

== Watershed ==
Ackerson Creek drains 11.60 square miles (30.0 km^{2}) of area, receives about 42.9 in/year of precipitation, has a wetness index of 364.64, and is about 82% forested.
