= Marion Township, Boone County, Indiana =

Marion Township
- Township
- Location of Marion Township in Boone County
- Coordinates: 40°07′16″N 86°17′33″W
- Country: United States
- State: Indiana
- County: Boone

Government
  - Type: Indiana township

Area
  - Total: 45.94 sq mi (119.0 km^{2})
  - Land: 45.93 sq mi (119.0 km^{2})
  - Water: 0.01 sq mi (0.026 km^{2})
- Elevation: 950 ft (290 m)

Population (2020)
  - Total: 1,268
  - Density: 26.8/sq mi (10.3/km^{2})
- FIPS code: 18-46854
- GNIS feature ID: 453603

Marion Township is one of twelve townships in Boone County, Indiana. As of the 2010 census, its population was 1,233 and it contained 506 housing units.

== Geography ==
According to the 2010 census, the township has a total area of 45.94 square miles (119.0 km^{2}), of which 45.93 square miles (119.0 km^{2}) (or 99.98%) is land and 0.01 square miles (0.026 km^{2}) (or 0.02%) is water.

=== Unincorporated towns ===
- Terhune
- Waugh

=== Adjacent townships ===
- Center (southwest)
- Clinton (west)
- Union (south)
- Adams Township, Hamilton County (east)
- Kirklin Township, Clinton County (northwest)
- Sugar Creek Township, Clinton County (north)
- Washington Township, Hamilton County (southeast)

=== Major highways ===
- U.S. Route 421
- Indiana State Road 38
- Indiana State Road 47

=== Cemeteries ===
The township contains two cemeteries: Bethel and Parr-Jones.
