= Andrew B. VanHuys Round Barn =

- U.S. National Register of Historic Places
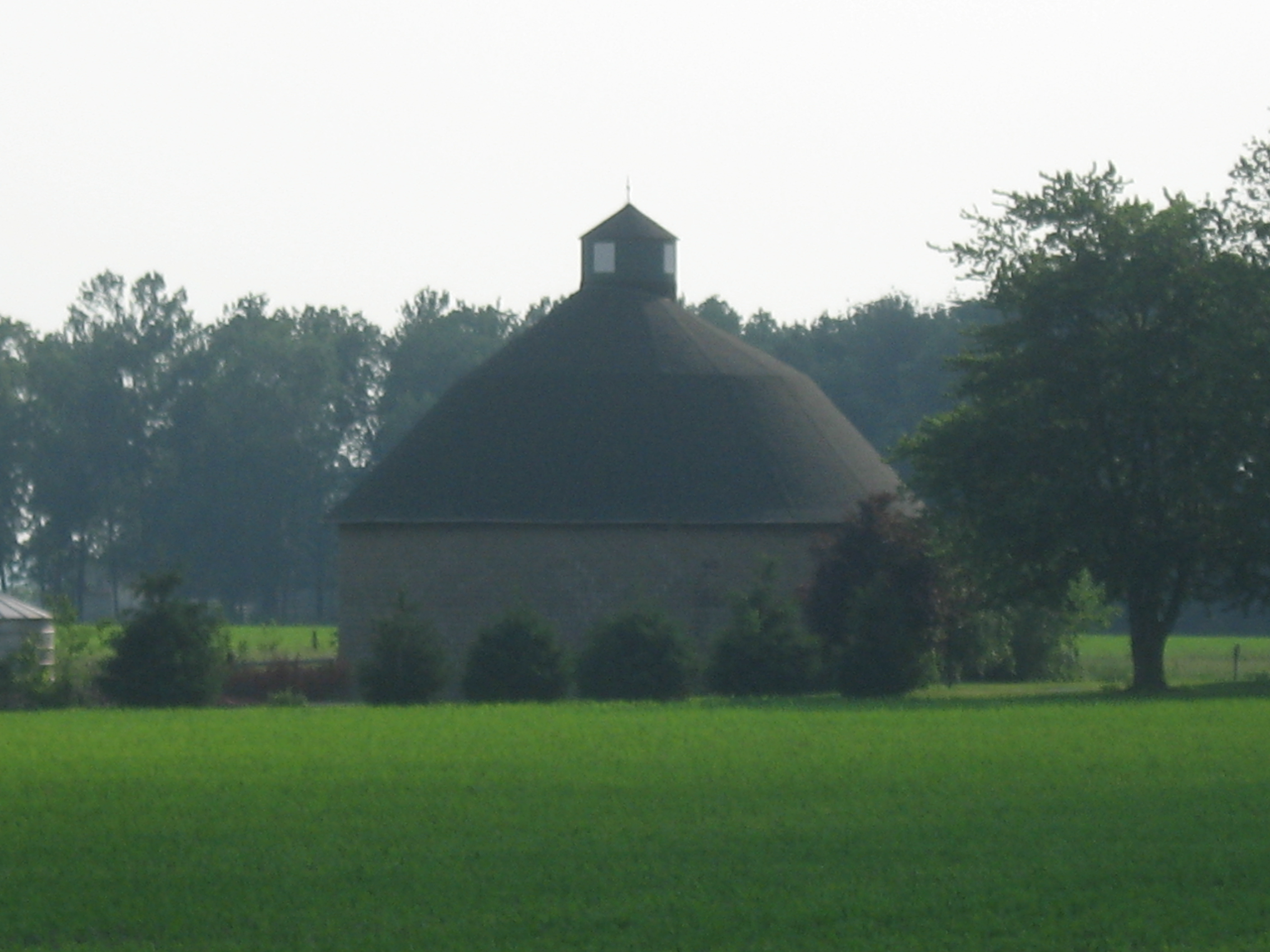
- Distant view of the barn

- Location within Boone County, Indiana Location within Indiana Location within the United States
- Location: 755 W. County Road 125 S., south of Lebanon
- Nearest city: Lebanon, Indiana
- Coordinates: 40°1′17.4″N 86°29′0″W
- Area: Less than 1 acre (0.40 ha)
- Built: 1912
- Built by: Andrew B. VanHuys
- Architectural style: Round barn
- MPS: Round and Polygonal Barns of Indiana MPS
- NRHP reference No.: 93000181
- Added to NRHP: April 2, 1993

The Andrew B. VanHuys Round Barn is a round barn near Lebanon, Indiana, United States. Built in 1912, it was listed on the National Register of Historic Places in 1993.

It is the only surviving historic round barn in Indiana made of concrete block construction. There were two others built—the Hollingsworth Barn in Harrison Township, Howard County, Indiana and the Gallaham Barn in Erie Township, Miami County, Indiana—but those have been lost.
