= Sugar Creek (Honey Creek tributary) =

Stream in the American state of Missouri

Coordinates: 40.336988°N 91.523768°W

Sugar Creek is a stream in Clark County in the U.S. state of Missouri. It is a tributary of Honey Creek.

Sugar Creek was named for the sugar maple timber lining its course.

== See also ==
- List of rivers of Missouri
