= Sugar Creek (Little Miami River tributary) =

Stream in Ohio, U.S.

Coordinates: 39°37′13″N 84°02′59″W

Sugar Creek is a stream in the U.S. state of Ohio. It is a tributary of the Little Miami River. Sugar Creek was named for the sugar maple trees along its course.

== See also ==
- List of rivers of Ohio
