= Jolietville, Indiana =

Jolietville
- Town
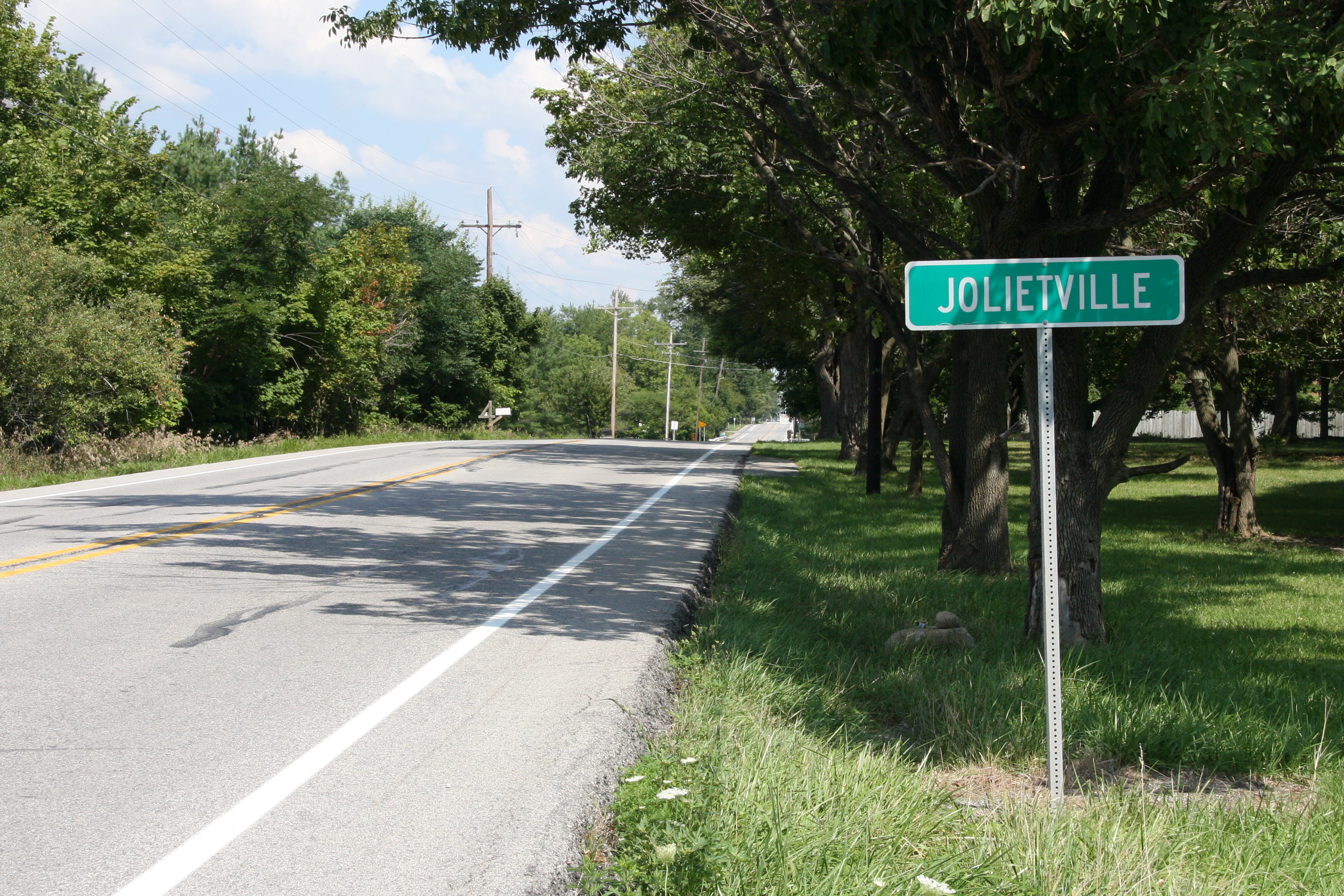
- Looking east toward Jolietville along Indiana State Road 32

- Location within Indiana
- Coordinates: 40°02′31″N 86°13′52″W
- Country: United States
- State: Indiana
- County: Hamilton
- Township: Westfield Washington
- Elevation: 919 ft (280 m)
- ZIP code: 46074
- FIPS code: 18-38844
- GNIS feature ID: 437071

Jolietville is a neighborhood of Westfield, Indiana, in Washington Township, Hamilton County, Indiana. It was formerly an unincorporated community, but was annexed by Westfield in the late 2000s or early 2010s.

== Geography ==
Jolietville is located at 40°02′31″N 86°13′52″W. The community is located at the intersection of Indiana State Road 32 and Joliet Road, just east of the Indianapolis Executive Airport.
