= Sugar Creek (Laurel Creek tributary) =

Stream in West Virginia, U.S.

Coordinates: 39°09′24″N 79°58′15″W

Sugar Creek is a stream in the U.S. state of West Virginia. It is a tributary to Laurel Creek.

Sugar Creek was named for the sugar maple trees which grow near its course.
