= Sugar Creek (Toccoa River tributary) =

Creek in the US state of Georgia

Coordinates: 34°56′2.29″N 84°21′12.72″W

Sugar Creek is a stream in the U.S. state of Georgia. It is a tributary to the Toccoa River.

The name Sugar Creek comes from the Cherokee Indians of the area, on account of the Honey locust trees near the stream's banks.
