= Washington Township, Hamilton County, Indiana =

Westfield Washington Township Washington Township (1833–2018)
- Township
- Logo

- Location in Hamilton County
- Coordinates: 40°02′58″N 86°10′21″W
- Country: United States
- State: Indiana
- County: Hamilton
- Organized: 1833

Government
  - Type: Indiana township
  - Trustee: Jamie Goetz Mills

Area
  - Total: 55.98 sq mi (145.0 km^{2})
  - Land: 55.68 sq mi (144.2 km^{2})
  - Water: 0.3 sq mi (0.78 km^{2}) 0.54%
- Elevation: 922 ft (281 m)

Population (2020)
  - Total: 49,262
  - Density: 884.7/sq mi (341.6/km^{2})
- Time zone: UTC-5 (EST)
  - Summer (DST): UTC-4 (EDT)
- ZIP codes: 46032-46034, 46062, 46069, 46074, 46077
- Area codes: 317/463
- FIPS code: 18-82714
- GNIS feature ID: 0453998
- Website: www.wwtownship29.in.gov

Westfield Washington Township is one of nine townships in Hamilton County, Indiana, United States. As of the 2020 census, its population was 49,262. Due to Clay Township (neighboring to the south) becoming more conservative with development due to a reduction in available land over the past few years, Westfield Washington Township has seen an increase in residential communities being developed.

== History ==
Washington Township was organized in 1833. In 2018, the Hamilton County Board of Commissioners ordered that Washington Township officially change its name to Westfield Washington Township, effective November 10, 2018.

== Geography ==
According to the 2010 census, the township has a total area of 55.98 square miles (145.0 km^{2}), of which 55.68 square miles (144.2 km^{2}) (or 99.46%) is land and 0.3 square miles (0.78 km^{2}) (or 0.54%) is water. The streams of Bear Creek, Cool Creek, Finley Creek, Grassy Branch, Jones Ditch, Kreager Ditch, Little Eagle Creek, and Woodruff Branch run through this township.

=== Cities and towns ===
- Westfield

=== Unincorporated communities ===
- Eagletown
- Hortonville
- Lamong

(This list is based on USGS data and may include former settlements.)

=== Adjacent townships ===
- Adams Township (north)
- Jackson Township (northeast)
- Noblesville Township (east)
- Clay Township (south)
- Eagle Township, Boone County (southwest)
- Union Township, Boone County (west)
- Marion Township, Boone County (northwest)

=== Cemeteries ===
The township contains twelve cemeteries: Anti-Slavery Friends, Chester, Eagletown, Greenwood, Hammack, Little Eagle Creek, Memorial Park, Pleasant View, Sugar Grove, Summit Lawn, Summit Lawn and Thomas And Moore.

=== Major highways ===
- U.S. Route 31
- State Road 32
- State Road 38

=== Airports and landing strips ===
- Helicopter Airways of Indiana
- Pace Airport
- Wilderness Field

== Education ==
Westfield Washington Township residents may obtain a free library card from Westfield Washington Public Library in Westfield.
