= Sugar Creek (Wyaconda River tributary) =

Stream in the US state of Missouri

Sugar Creek is a stream in Clark and Lewis Counties in the U.S. state of Missouri. It is a tributary of the Wyaconda River.

The stream source is in southern Clark County approximately one-half mile north of the Clark-Lewis county line at 40°15′53″N 91°49′02″W and an elevation of about 720 feet. The stream flows to the east-southeast into Lewis County and passes about one mile north of Williamstown. It continues to the southeast passing the community of Benjamin where it turns more to the southeast and crosses under Missouri Route 16. It enters the Wyaconda River approximately three miles west of Canton at 40°07′27″N 91°34′40″W at an elevation of 522 feet.

Sugar Creek most likely was named for the sugar maple trees along its course.

== See also ==
- List of rivers of Missouri
