= Milledgeville, Indiana =

- Unincorporated community
- Boone County's location in Indiana

- Location in Boone County
- Coordinates: 39°58′27″N 86°29′49″W
- Country: United States
- State: Indiana
- County: Boone
- Township: Harrison
- Elevation: 955 ft (291 m)
- Time zone: UTC-5 (Eastern (EST))
  - Summer (DST): UTC-4 (EDT)
- ZIP code: 46052
- Area code: 765
- FIPS code: 18-49446
- GNIS feature ID: 439175

Milledgeville is an unincorporated community in Harrison Township, Boone County, in the U.S. state of Indiana.

== History ==
A post office was established at Milledgeville (spelled Millageville during the first year) in 1874, and remained in operation until it was discontinued in 1899.

== Geography ==
Milledgeville is located at 39°58′27″N 86°29′49″W.
