= Sugar Creek Township, Clinton County, Indiana =

Sugar Creek Township
- Township
- Location of Sugar Creek Township in Clinton County
- Coordinates: 40°13′53″N 86°17′12″W
- Country: United States
- State: Indiana
- County: Clinton
- Organized: 1841

Government
  - Type: Indiana township

Area
  - Total: 25.84 sq mi (66.9 km^{2})
  - Land: 25.84 sq mi (66.9 km^{2})
  - Water: 0 sq mi (0 km^{2})
- Elevation: 920 ft (280 m)

Population (2020)
  - Total: 456
  - Density: 17.6/sq mi (6.81/km^{2})
- FIPS code: 18-73862
- GNIS feature ID: 453881

Sugar Creek Township is one of fourteen townships in Clinton County, Indiana. As of the 2020 census, its population was 456 (slightly up from 450 at 2010) and it contained 207 housing units. The township is named for the stream that flows southwest through it.

== History ==
The first settler in the area of Sugar Creek Township was Williams Harris, who arrived in 1828, built a cabin and hunted and fished in the wilderness — he was the only white inhabitant for four years, until the arrival of farmer Abner Dunn and his family in 1832, then Merrill Cooper and blacksmith W. V. McKinney in 1835. Though originally slow, settlement in the township increased in the 1840s and by 1850 its population was 477; by 1860 it was 719, in 1870 it was 964, and in 1880 it was 1410.

The area's residents petitioned in 1841 for their own township, a request granted by the county commissioners who formed Sugar Creek Township from a portion of Jackson.

== Geography ==
According to the 2010 census, the township has a total area of 25.84 square miles (66.9 km^{2}), all land.

=== Unincorporated towns ===
- Pickard

=== Adjacent townships ===
- Johnson Township (north)
- Jefferson Township, Tipton County (east)
- Adams Township, Hamilton County (southeast)
- Marion Township, Boone County (south)
- Kirklin Township (west)

=== Major highways ===
- Indiana State Road 28
- Indiana State Road 38
