= Sugar Creek (Wabash River tributary) =

Waterway in Indiana, United States

Coordinates: 40°03′00″N 86°54′37″W

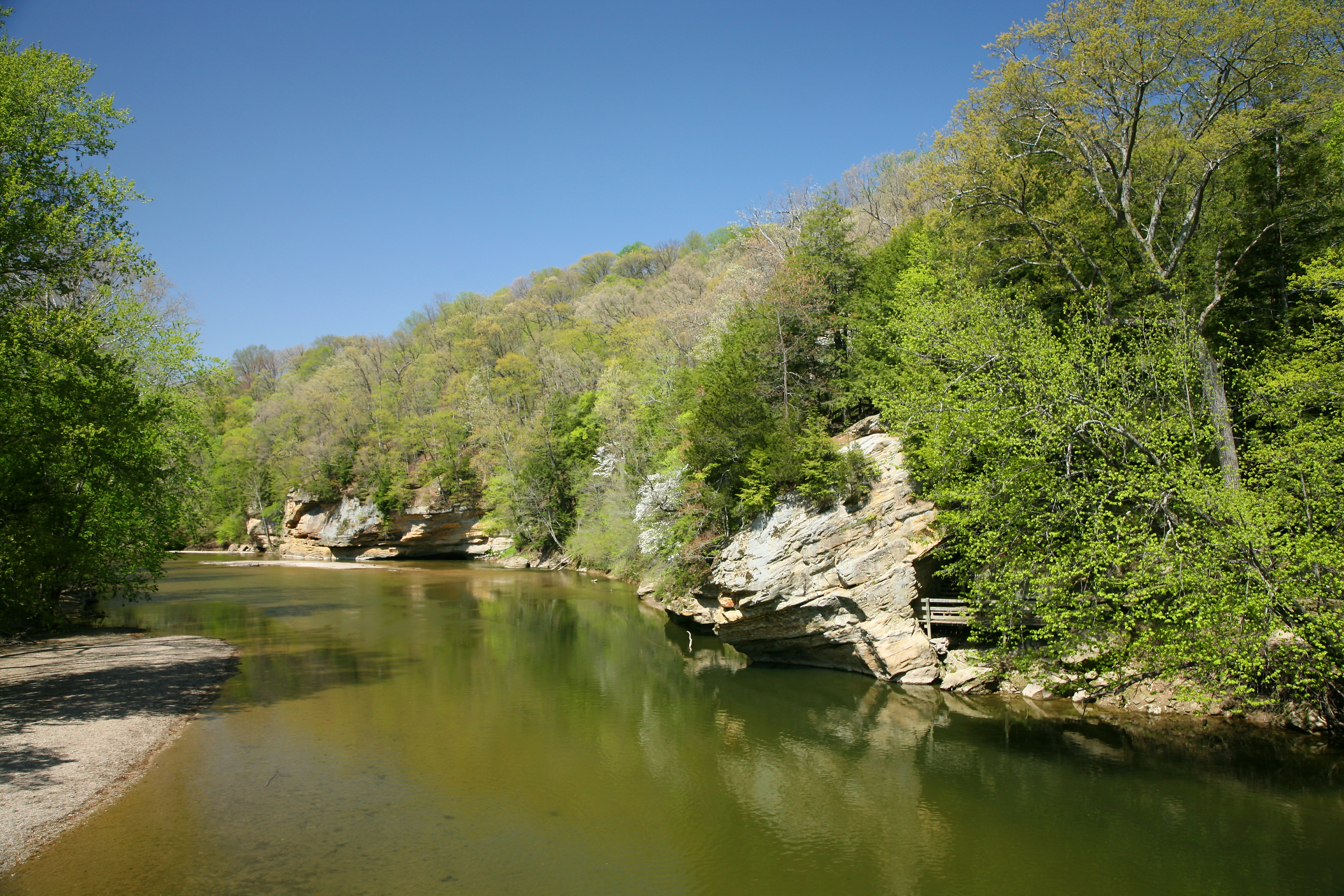
Sugar Creek as it passes through Turkey Run State Park

Sugar Creek is a waterway located in the U.S. state of Indiana. It originates in a farm field approximately two miles south of Kempton, Indiana, and travels west-southwest for about 93 miles (150 km) before merging with the Wabash River 5 miles (8.0 km) north of Montezuma. The largest community on the waterway is Crawfordsville.

Sugar Creek flows through two Indiana state parks, Shades and Turkey Run, and is a popular tourist and canoeist attraction. The creek and its many small tributaries are noted for the picturesque canyons and small waterfalls they have created in the rocky terrain. The fictional The Sugar Creek Gang series of books is based along this creek.

The Darlington Covered Bridge spans Sugar Creek in Franklin Township, Montgomery County, Indiana. It was listed on the National Register of Historic Places in 1990.

Sugar Creek is well known to locals as a Smallmouth Bass fishing wonderland. Smallmouth thrive in Sugar Creek because there are many baitfish for them to eat and little competition.

Fish species include, Carp, Suckers, Smallmouth Bass and a small population of Largemouth Bass, Gar, Bluegill, Crappie, Rock Bass, Sunfish, Catfish, and Gar.

== See also ==
- List of rivers of Indiana
