= Franklin Township, Montgomery County, Indiana =

Franklin Township
- Township
- Location in Montgomery County
- Coordinates: 40°05′23″N 86°45′02″W
- Country: United States
- State: Indiana
- County: Montgomery

Government
  - Type: Indiana township

Area
  - Total: 38.93 sq mi (100.8 km^{2})
  - Land: 38.93 sq mi (100.8 km^{2})
  - Water: 0 sq mi (0 km^{2}) 0%
- Elevation: 846 ft (258 m)

Population (2020)
  - Total: 1,765
  - Density: 45.34/sq mi (17.51/km^{2})
- Time zone: UTC-5 (Eastern (EST))
  - Summer (DST): UTC-4 (EDT)
- ZIP codes: 46071, 47933, 47940
- Area code: 765
- GNIS feature ID: 453309

Franklin Township is one of eleven townships in Montgomery County, Indiana, United States. As of the 2020 census, its population was 1,765 (down from 1,915 at 2010) and it contained 749 housing units.

Franklin Township was established in 1831.

== History ==
Darlington Covered Bridge was listed on the National Register of Historic Places in 1990.

== Geography ==
According to the 2010 census, the township has a total area of 38.93 square miles (100.8 km^{2}), all land.

=== Cities, towns, villages ===
- Darlington

=== Unincorporated towns ===
- Shannondale at 40.0547637°N 86.6955609°W

(This list is based on USGS data and may include former settlements.)

=== Cemeteries ===
The township contains Greenlawn Cemetery.

=== Major highways ===
- Interstate 74
- Indiana State Road 32

== School districts ==
- North Montgomery School Corporation

== Political districts ==
- Indiana's 4th congressional district
- State House District 28
- State Senate District 23
