= Hinkle Creek =

Hinkle Creek may refer to:

- Hinkle Creek (California)
- Hinkle Creek (Indiana)
- Hinkle Creek (Oregon)
