= Deming, Indiana =

- Unincorporated community
- Location within Indiana Location within the United States
- Coordinates: 40°06′55″N 86°05′55″W
- Country: United States
- State: Indiana
- County: Hamilton
- Township: Jackson
- Platted: 1837
- Elevation: 892 ft (272 m)
- ZIP code: 46034
- FIPS code: 18-17650
- GNIS feature ID: 433464

Deming is an unincorporated community in Jackson Township, Hamilton County, Indiana, United States.

== History ==
=== Settlement and Early Years (1833-1853) ===
In 1833, the first pioneers settled in the locality of Deming, Indiana. The Land Office of Indianapolis sold land to said pioneers in 40-acre blocks for $1.25 an acre. The community was platted on August 10, 1837, by Elihu Pickett, Solomon Pheanis, and Lewis Jessup. It was originally named Farmington. When the first post office in the community was established on April 7, 1846, the post office was named Penfield, as there was already a Farmington post office in Indiana.

In its early years as a community, Farmington experienced rapid growth. Merchants and tradesmen grew Farmington into a thriving rural village. Much of this development was due to the fact that Farmington was expected to become a station on the railroad. However, when the Peru & Indianapolis Railroad reached the township in 1853, it dealt a death blow to Farmington's progress by bypassing it by a few miles.

=== Peak and Decline (1853-1940) ===
The name of the community and post office was changed, this time to Deming, on January 14, 1854. As many of the inhabitants of the community were abolitionists, it is believed that they renamed the community in honor of the Liberty Party's 1843 Indiana gubernatorial election candidate, Dr. Elizur Deming.

The size of Deming most likely peaked shortly after the Civil War. From that point onward, the community was on the decline. The Deming post office closed in 1902.

=== Revitalization by John Owen (1940-1951) ===
A wealthy businessman named John Owen began trying to revitalize Deming in 1940. He opened a store for a few years and helped the community build a water system. Owen's efforts generated much excitement within the community. There was talk of building a monument, college, and park in Deming. However, upon Owen's death in 1951, hope for Deming having a future were once again lost.

=== Quaint Community (1951-present) ===
With the disbandment of the Deming Wesleyan Church in 1976, only Hinkle Lodge and a handful of homes were left in Deming.

As Indianapolis grows, suburban sprawl increases the size of nearby Westfield, Noblesville, and Cicero. In 2025, Cicero approved the first neighborhood to be built near Deming despite local backlash.

== Organizations ==
On May 9, 1863, a dozen or so Master Masons gathered in a store in Deming to apply for a charter from the Grand Lodge of Indiana. The charter was granted, and Hinkle Lodge No. 310 was organized in Deming on May 26, 1864. The Noblesville Ledger stated that "the lodge prospered very fast in an early day, meeting every few nights and sometimes during the day to initiate members. A great many were hurriedly received in order that they might answer Lincoln's call for troops." Fellow Mason and Wesleyan preacher Jabez Neal was paid $1,450 by Hinkle Lodge for the construction of a Masonic Hall in Deming. Beginning in 1865, Hinkle Lodge met on the second floor of the hall while the Deming Wesleyan Church gathered on the main floor. The Deming Wesleyan Church eventually sold Hinkle Lodge the land that the hall was on in 1898. Hinkle Lodge is still active as of 2026.

== Churches ==
The Hinkle Creek Friends Church, located near where Hinkle Road and 215th Street intersect, was organized in 1836 by settlers in the Deming and Bakers Corner area who moved here from North Carolina and Virginia because of their opposition to slavery. The church is active as of 2023.

A Wesleyan Church began meeting in Deming in 1865 on the main floor of Hinkle Lodge. However, for several years prior to that, the congregation had met for worship in the Deming school. The congregation constructed their own church building and dedicated it on August 13, 1899. By the time the 1970s rolled around, it was noted that the Deming Wesleyan Church membership had dwindled to practically zero. On August 27, 1976, the church placed their final invitation in the local newspapers. Beginning six days later, ads were run in newspapers that listed the former church building for sale at $13,000. An artist named Carol Bochoski eventually purchased the building and turned it into her home studio.

About half a mile to the west of Deming was the West Grove Friends Church. Many of its founders and members lived in the Deming neighborhood. The church was organized in c. 1837 as a preparative meeting under the leadership of White Lick Friends Church of Morgan County, Indiana. The church also laid out the West Grove Friends Cemetery. The congregation met for worship in their homes and continued to do so until the church constructed a meeting house in 1853. That same year the church became an established meeting. Jesse Beals donated the land that the meeting house sat on, while Charles Hiatt gave the land that was used for hitching purposes. A tan yard at the crossroads to the east of the church provided the oak bark strips that were used to insulate the meeting house. The meeting house was a frame building with a partition through its center to separate the men and women during their business meetings. Raised platforms or galleries held the heads of the meetings. At a later date, the church replaced this meeting house with a new one. In 1855, the church began to prepare for its own monthly meetings under the guidance of the Hinkle Creek Friends Church. It would take until July 28, 1873, for the church to host their first monthly meetings. The church would go on to have its first quarterly meeting on September 1, 1873. When the church was dissolved in 1963, a small number of their members went to Hinkle Creek Friends Church, some to Sheridan Friends Meeting, a handful dropped their names from membership, and others joined different denominations." The former meetinghouse was razed in 1964.

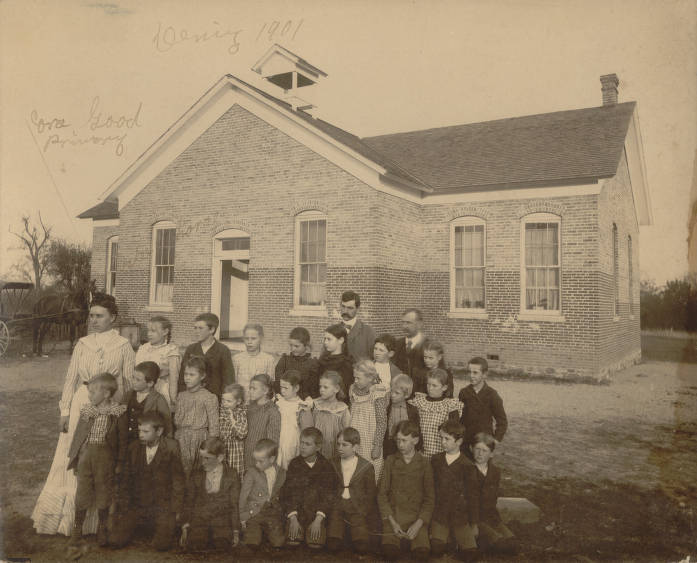
A class in 1901 at the Deming school.

== Education ==
For a time, there were two schools that served the students who lived in/around Deming. One was known as the Deming school. First built around 1855 on the eastern side of the community, it was originally a small one-room schoolhouse. In 1871, The Noblesville Ledger described how the Deming schoolhouse filled the place of "seminary, church, town hall, and club room." In 1881, a two-room brick schoolhouse was constructed to replace the older schoolhouse and classes began that year. It was officially known as Public School No. 18, but most people still referred to it as the Deming school. A stable was built for the students' horses in 1905. During the summer of 1906, the 1881 schoolhouse was demolished. It was replaced with an all-brick schoolhouse that was two-stories tall (plus a basement) and had eight rooms. In 1915, a tennis court was added to the school's playground. The last recorded school activities at the Deming school took place in the spring of 1930. In September 1931, the schoolhouse was sold for $160 to a nearby property owner by the name of Mrs. Griffin. The former schoolhouse was partially dismantled and then razed in c. 1939, with the lumber from the building being sold to a sawmill owner in an auction. Beginning in 1941, the former students and teachers from the Deming school held annual reunions. They were typically held in Noblesville, with a few exceptions. The number of attendees dwindled throughout the 1950s, and at the last recorded reunion in 1958, only 15 former students and 8 guests attended.

The second school used by the Deming community was generally referred to as the West Grove school, though it was officially known as Public School No. 20. It was located next to the West Grove Friends Church. The original schoolhouse was constructed sometime before 1867, with a replacement schoolhouse being built at an unspecified time. The fate of the school is not recorded, though in 2003 it was noted that the "school buildings are no longer there."

== Geography ==
Early settlers found that the soil of this region had enough sand in it to make for naturally well-drained land. The surrounding forests were thick with poplar, sugar, walnut, and oak trees, which denoted fertile soil. This combination made for easy cultivation and bountiful harvests. Surrounding the community to the north and east was Hinkle Creek. On the western side of the community, the upper part of Lick Creek—named so for a salt spring that deer enjoyed licking—formed a swamp known as “The Dismal.” Springs and quagmires made The Dismal a bad place for farming. The Dismal stretched diagonally southwest for the three miles between Deming and Hortonville until it was drained in the late 1800s or early 1900s by a network of drainage ditches.

== Underground Railroad involvement ==
Many inhabitants in and around present-day Deming were actively involved in assisting runaway slaves on the Underground Railroad. In 1837, runaway slaves John and Louann Rhodes, along with their daughter Lydia Rhodes, arrived in present-day Deming via the Underground Railroad. The family recuperated in preparation for continuing their journey to Canada at the home of Joseph Baker, which was located to the west of Deming. Finding the area to their liking, the Rhodes family settled in nearby Bakers Corner. In 1844, they were involved in the Rhodes family incident. After the incident was resolved, the family continued living on their homestead.
