= Hans-Jørgen Holman =

Norwegian-American musicologist (1925–1986)

- Born: Hans-Jörgen Holmen-Guttormsen; 20 February 1925; Drammen, Buskerud, Norway
- Died: 6 August 1986 (aged 61)
- Education: Oslo Conservatory of Music; University of Oslo; Washington Adventist University; Catholic University of America; Indiana University Bloomington
- Occupations: Pianist; harpsichordist; musicologist; professor of music
- Years active: 1957–1986
- Employers: Indiana Academy; Andrews University
- Notable work: Harvard Dictionary of Music; Michigan Academician

Hans-Jørgen Holman (also Hans-Jörgen Holmen-Guttormsen; 20 February 1925 – 6 August 1986) was a Norwegian-American pianist, harpsichordist, and professor of music at Andrews University, Berrien Springs, Michigan. Holman specialized in Medieval and Renaissance music, and his 1961 Indiana University School of Music doctoral dissertation, The Responsoria Prolixa of the Codex Worcester F 160, is considered one of the principal authoritative works on the vocal music of the medieval church. One of the first musicologists to pioneer computer aided big-data studies, Holman built a database of 48.000 melodic phrases from European and Scandinavian sources in order to trace melodic migration and development. He was particularly interested in questions concerning the relationship between the religious vocal folk music of Norway and the liturgical music of the medieval church. Holman gave papers on topics of musicology at several international conferences and made contributions to the Harvard Dictionary of Music.

== Life ==
=== Early years ===
Holman was born in Drammen, south-east Norway. He was the only child of Hans and Kirsten Halvorsen Guttormsen. A family of profoundly pious Christians, they also had a successful business at the family estate called Holmen at nearby Konnerud, raising minks, yielding precious fur. The family's affluence provided Holman with a relatively comfortable upbringing – an illustrative anecdote is that his mother Kirsten was the first woman in the city to have a driver's license. Holman displayed early on that he was fitted with a powerful intellect and an inquisitive mind; he took a deep interest in music, but also pursued studies in mathematics, physics and chemistry. Holman was only 15 years old when Nazi German troops invaded Norway. Even though he was a mere teenager focusing on his education, it did not prevent him from becoming an active member of the underground resistance movement.

=== Emigrating to America ===
In 1950, Holman passed the Piano Teacher's Examination at the Conservatory of Music in Oslo. Not long after, he also received his Diploma in Pharmacology from the University of Oslo. Possibly disillusioned with the limited professional opportunities in post-war Norway, Holman and his first wife, Elli, decided to emigrate to the United States the same year. They settled at Takoma Park in Maryland, near Washington, D.C. Later they changed their surname from Guttormsen to Holman (an anglicisation of Holmen, the name of Hans-Jorgen's family estate) to make their names easier for English speakers. In Maryland, Holman was attracted to Washington Adventist University. He enrolled at the college's music department, where he graduated the following year with a bachelor's degree in Piano Performance. Holman was then offered the position of Chairman of the Music Department at Indiana Academy, a school for secondary education, and he moved to Cicero, Indiana. Yet, Holman wanted further education, and developed his lifelong infatuation with Medieval and Renaissance church music through studies at the Catholic University of America, Washington, D.C., where he earned a master's degree in 1954.

=== A musicological tour-de-force ===
Holman had become one of the more highly educated Norwegians in music subjects of his time. Furthermore, he had devoted much time developing his spirituality at the Christian universities and elsewhere. After Holman graduated from the Catholic University of America, he then approached Indiana University Bloomington, with a proposal for the degree of Doctor of Philosophy. He wanted to conduct a musicological study of the Worcester Antiphoner – a collection of Old-Roman antiphones held at the Worcester Cathedral Library, England. This 13th-century manuscript – also known as Worcester F 160 – is often considered a unique and rare example of its genre. Holman, inspired by his profound affinity with the vocal tradition of the church, had taken the trouble of acquiring an intimate knowledge of Greek and Latin. Now he was determined to employ all his extraordinary knowledge and his insights in the tradition not only to do a scholarly study, but also a personal study. In 1961, Holman was awarded a PhD in palaeography and musicology for his dissertation on the antiphoner entitled The Responsoria Prolixa of the Codex Worcester F 160. The dissertation, which comprises two large volumes and 855 pages, is widely quoted and by many considered an authoritative work in its field.

== Professional career and research interests ==
=== At Andrews University ===
Rumors were heard of the results of the hard-working Norwegian while he still was writing his doctoral thesis. In 1957, Holman was approached by Andrews University – perhaps the most renowned educational institution of the Seventh-day Adventist Church – and offered to join its staff. Holman accepted and worked as Associate Professor to the Department of Music. The Holmans moved to Berrien Springs, Michigan, looking to a prosperous future on the shores of Lake Michigan; however, Elli tragically died from tuberculosis in 1962.

Holman had a remarkable professional career at Andrews University. He taught the piano and the harpsichord and continued researching. In 1963, he married Rae Constantine, a music graduate of the university. The following year he became Professor of Music at age 39. During 1965–67, he directed the Andrews University Orchestra – an unusual capacity, he was involved in up to 200 musical performances yearly. Furthermore, he developed and taught a competitive Master's program, producing several brilliant scholars, including Dr. Carlos Flores, the current Chairman of the School of Music at the university. A recognized authority in his field, Holman gave papers at numerous musicology conferences and published widely – contributing to the Harvard Dictionary of Music and the Michigan Academician. He traveled extensively and taught at various universities around the world. He also produced special programs for several American and European broadcasting companies, including the Norwegian National Broadcasting (NRK).

=== A pioneer American big-data study on Norwegian folk music ===
At the 25th conference of the International Folk Music Council, held in Oslo, Norway, in 1979, Holman presented to a broader community of ethnomusicologists his ideas and pioneering work using computers to aid studies in the field. Building on the work of established Norwegian research thus far, Holman observed in the vocal folk music of Norway that its melodies contained recurring standardized patterns or formulae. In a later paper, Holman contended that singers of traditional Norwegian vocal folk music were keepers of a panoply of musical phrases from which new melodic material had been constructed when needed, and that typical phrases originated from the music of the Catholic church. The result was the sum total of Norwegian folk music, which is both heterogenous and uniform; the music is characterized by a distinctive melodic inflection that sets it apart and gave character to Norway's classical music in the 1800s onwards (e.g. that of Grieg). Holman could support these claims with print-outs from the database he had built at the Music Department at Andrews University. Here, he and a handful of students had digitalized some 12.000 melodies as 48.000 separate melodic phrases, making it possible to trace specific melodic phrases across the large collections of the European and Scandinavian melodic heritage. Holman demonstrated how distinct phrases from responsories appeared in Norwegian folk music. The inspiration for this work came from his study of the Codex Worcester, wherein Holman had identified and catalogued the standard phrases from which the responsories were constructed (centonization). Holman published two articles in Studia Musicologica Norvegica on this research, in 1980 and 1982.

== Death ==
Following a lingering illness, Holman died on 6 August 1986, aged 61. The day before, he was presented with the John Nevis Andrews Medallion "in recognition of his significant contribution to the advancement of knowledge and education". The medallion is Andrews University's highest award. After Holman's death, his family, together with the university, inaugurated a scholarship in his name, and which is awarded annually. Holman's papers were catalogued into the Holman collection which is kept at Andrews University. Dr. Paul E. Hamel of Andrews University stated that Holman "was one of our most productive, loyal, and esteemed professors of music".

== Other sources ==
- International Adventist Musicological Association. Eulogy: Hans-Jorgen Holman (Paul E. Hamel, 3 February 2007) http://www.iamaonline.com/Bio/HOLMAN.htm
- Interviews with Erik and Laila Borge and Toril Azora Borge Kielland in Norway, September 2006 and January 2007.
- Interviews with A. Rae Constantine Holman, Michigan, 2008 and 2021/2022.
