= Turner Joy =

Turner Joy may refer to:

- C. Turner Joy (1895-1956), American admiral
- USS Turner Joy, a United States Navy destroyer
