= Adams Township, Hamilton County, Indiana =

Township in Indiana, United States

Adams Township
- Township
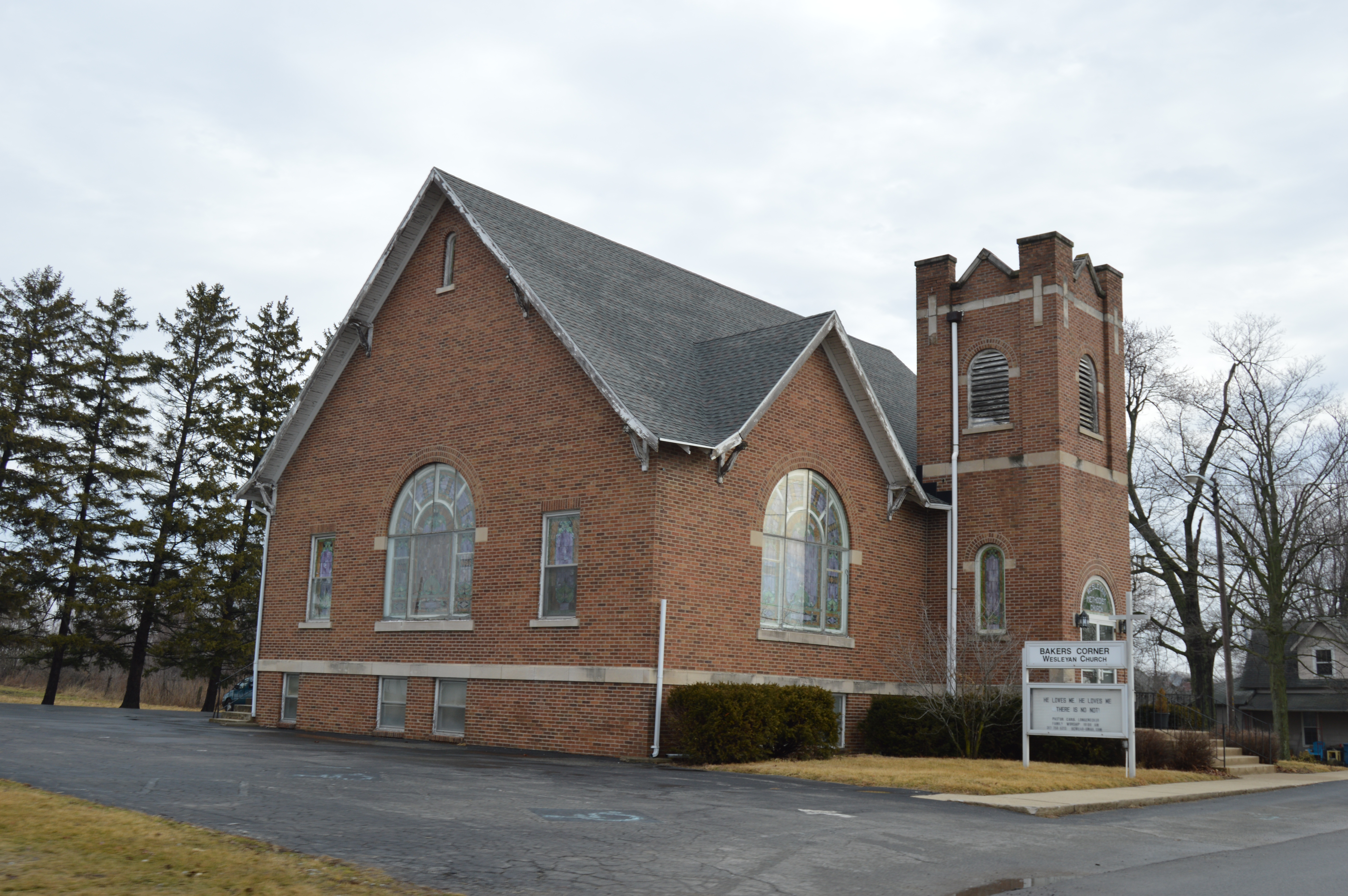
- Wesleyan church at Bakers Corner

- Seal

- Location in Hamilton County
- Coordinates: 40°09′25″N 86°11′08″W
- Country: United States
- State: Indiana
- County: Hamilton
- Organized: 1833
- Consolidated: January 1, 2025

Government
  - Type: Indiana township

Area
  - Total: 48.36 sq mi (125.25 km^{2})
  - Land: 48.27 sq mi (125.03 km^{2})
  - Water: 0.087 sq mi (0.23 km^{2})
- Elevation: 922 ft (281 m)

Population (2020)
  - Total: 5,218
  - Density: 108.1/sq mi (41.73/km^{2})
- Time zone: UTC-5 (EST)
  - Summer (DST): UTC-4 (EDT)
- ZIP codes: 46030 (Arcadia); 46031 (Atlanta); 46034 (Cicero); 46050 (Kirklin); 46069 (Sheridan)
- Area codes: 317, 463
- FIPS code: 18-00388
- GNIS feature ID: 453077
- Website: www.adamstownship.net

Adams Township is one of nine townships in Hamilton County, Indiana, United States. At the 2020 census, its population was 5,218.

== History ==
Adams Township was organized in 1833.

In 2024, residents of Sheridan and Adams Township voted overwhelmingly in favor of consolidating both governments, which was made official on January 1, 2025.

== Geography ==
According to the 2020 census, the township has a total area of 48.361 square miles (125.25 km^{2}), of which 48.274 square miles (125.03 km^{2}) (or 99.81%) is land and 0.087 square miles (0.23 km^{2}) (or 0.19%) is water. The streams of Baker Ditch, Cicero Creek, Eagle Creek, Fouch Ditch, Hinkle Creek, Jay Ditch, Jones Ditch, Lindley Ditch, Little Cicero Creek, McKinzie Ditch, Pearce Ditch, Prairie Creek, Ross Ditch and Teter Branch, run through the township.

=== Cities and towns ===
- Sheridan

=== Unincorporated communities ===
- Bakers Corner
- Boxley
- East Union
- Ekin

(This list is based on USGS data and may include former settlements.)

=== Adjacent townships ===
- Jefferson Township, Tipton County (north)
- Cicero Township, Tipton County (northeast)
- Jackson Township (east)
- Washington Township (south)
- Marion Township, Boone County (west)
- Sugar Creek Township, Clinton County (northwest)

=== Cemeteries ===
The township contains nine cemeteries: Boxley, Crown Hill, Phillips, Ridge, Spencer, Spicewood, Teter, Union Grove and Wiles.

=== Major highways ===
- U.S. Route 31
- State Road 38
- State Road 47

=== Airports and landing strips ===
- Black Hawk Airport
- Sheridan Airport
- Windy Knoll Airport

== Education ==
Adams Township residents may obtain a free library card from Sheridan Public Library in Sheridan.

Sheridan Community Schools covers Adams Township as well as neighboring Marion Township in Boone County.
