= Morse Reservoir =

Reservoir in Hamilton County, Indiana

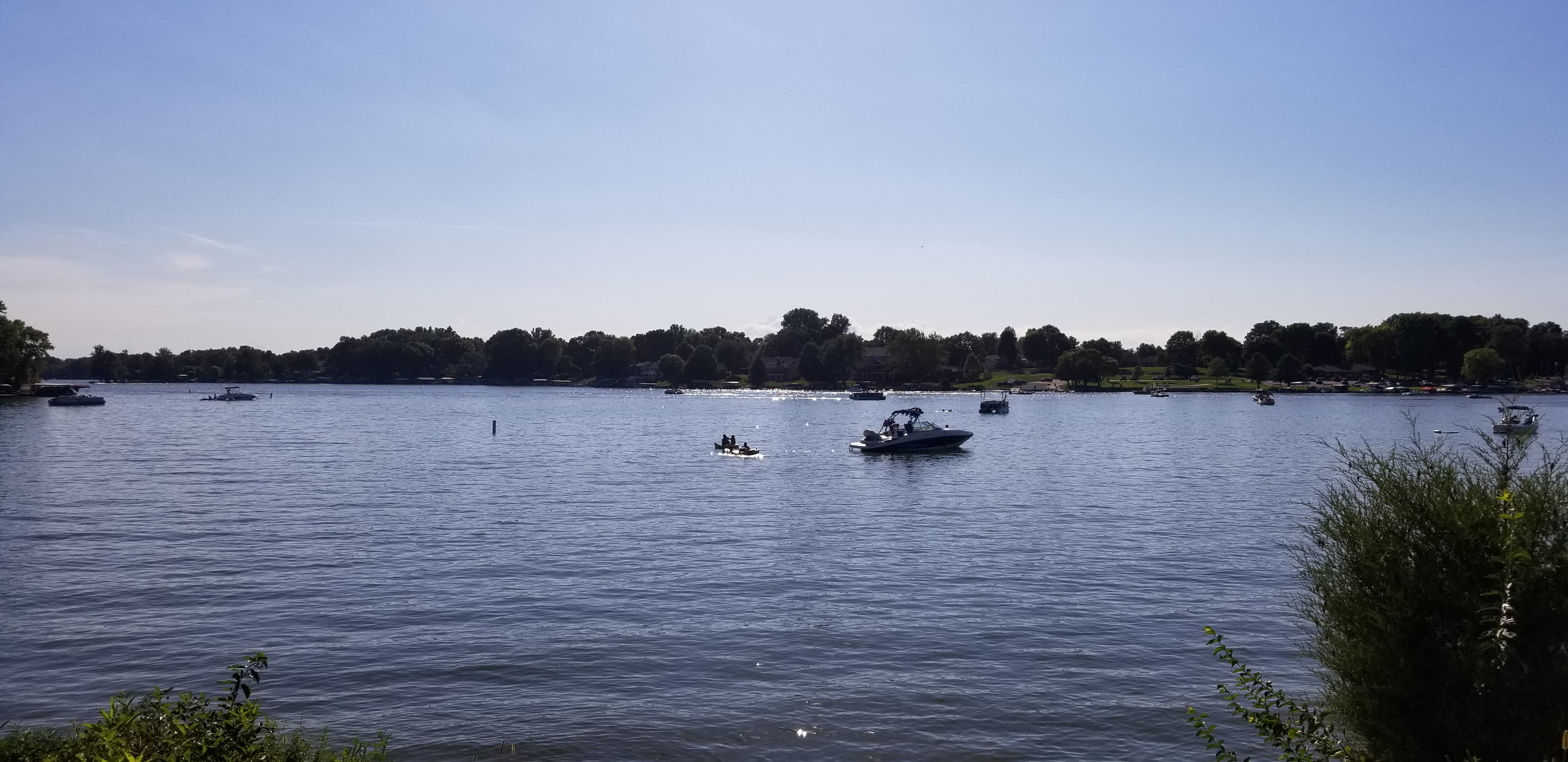
- Image of Morse near Cicero

- Location within Indiana Location within the United States
- Location: Hamilton County, Indiana
- Coordinates: 40.103°N 86.04°W
- Type: Reservoir
- Primary inflows: Cicero Creek
- Primary outflows: Cicero Creek
- Basin countries: United States
- Max. length: 6.5 mi (10.5 km)
- Surface area: 1,439 acres (5.82 km^{2})
- Settlements: Cicero

Morse Reservoir is a large reservoir located in northwestern Hamilton County, Indiana. The reservoir is owned and operated by Citizens Energy Group, a corporation who acquired the Indianapolis Water Company, which created the lake in 1956. The reservoir serves both as a significant source of drinking water and of recreation for nearby areas. It is primarily located within the town of Cicero, itself situated on the lakefront of Morse, while the reservoir's dam is in Noblesville. The area around Morse has seen significant residential development in recent years, although the reservoir's basin is primarily rural.

== Geography ==
Morse Reservoir is located 3.2 mi (5.1 km) from the city of Noblesville, and 22 mi (35 km) from the city of Indianapolis. The reservoir has a surface area of 1,439 acres (582 ha), a length of around 6.5 mi (10.5 km), and a shoreline length of approximately 32.5 mi (52.3 km). Its width is varied, between only a few hundred feet in some sections to over 2,000 ft (610 m). A 2016 bathymetric study by the United States Geological Survey (USGS) found the reservoir to have a water volume of 21,146 acre⋅ft (26,083,000 m^{3}). The reservoir has an average elevation of 810 ft (250 m), with a record high of 813.44 ft (247.94 m) being reported in April 2013, and a record low of 800.26 ft (243.92 m) in November 1999. The reservoir has an average depth of 15.4 ft (4.7 m), with the southern portion of the reservoir being deeper than the northern portion. The deepest point at Morse registered a depth of 42.5 ft (13.0 m). Between 1996 and 2016, the reservoir's average bottom elevation increased by .32 ft (0.098 m) due to sedimentation, especially in the northern end of the reservoir.

The reservoir's main outflow, Cicero Creek, enters the reservoir from the south, emptying into the White River 4.9 mi (7.9 km) downstream. Several inlets are located along the reservoir which lead to other bodies of water, including Bear Slide Creek and Hinkle Creek. The reservoir's watershed, about 214 mi^{2} (550 km^{2}) in size, includes a large portion of Hamilton County and extends into nearby Boone, Clinton, and Tipton counties. The land surrounding Morse Reservoir is primarily agricultural, with 84.6% of its basin being used for agriculture, however there are also a significant amount of homes located on the shoreline of Morse. The reservoir feeds two treatment plants designed for water collection, as well as the feed of the larger White River to the east of the reservoir. The reservoir's original dam is located in Noblesville, near East 196th Street.

There are two parks located on the shoreline of Morse Reservoir, those being the Red Bridge Park and the Morse Park and Beach. There are also several sporting and recreational facilities along the reservoir, including a golf course and volleyball court. Boating, fishing, and most forms of recreation are also permitted on the reservoir.

== History ==
Planning for the construction of Morse began in the 1920s to create a large water source for the Indianapolis metropolitan area to the south. Construction of the reservoir began in 1953, and Morse began operation in March 1956. The land purchased to create the reservoir was described as "mainly agricultural valleys". The reservoir was created by the Indianapolis Water Company and the reservoir was named after Howard S. Morse, the company's former CEO who had been associated with the company since 1925 and played a significant role in the design and construction of Morse as well as of nearby Geist Reservoir. The creation of the reservoir was performed through the damming of Cicero Creek via an earthfill dam. It was the third major reservoir constructed to serve the Indianapolis metropolitan area, doubling the region's water supply. The Indianapolis Water Company later became part of Citizens Energy Group, which continues to own and operate the reservoir.

The construction of Morse Reservoir altered the development of the nearby town of Cicero, which saw the destruction of several structures including a bridge in order to facilitate the creation of Morse. However, the reservoir's construction also led to further development and growth in the town, which has since quintupled in population since the reservoir was completed. In the 1970s, the Indianapolis Water Company constructed a real estate project along the reservoir which spurred further growth in the region, and today the land around the reservoir is the site of many high-end residences. Because the reservoir is designed to serve communities downstream of the reservoir, the city of Cicero cannot utilize the water from Morse for drinking purposes.

In 2005, the Morse Waterways Association was established with the goal of maintaining the reservoir. In recent years, the reservoir has begun to experience significant blooms of cyanobacteria. The reservoir has also been increasingly affected by droughts, with several in recent years causing water levels at the reservoir to drop considerably. In 2012, water levels at the reservoir fell nearly 6 ft (1.8 m), a decline exacerbated by the diversion of water to Indianapolis for drinking. In response, in June of that year boating was halted at the reservoir and all beaches were closed.
