= Frank C. McConnell =

US Army major general (1898–1981)

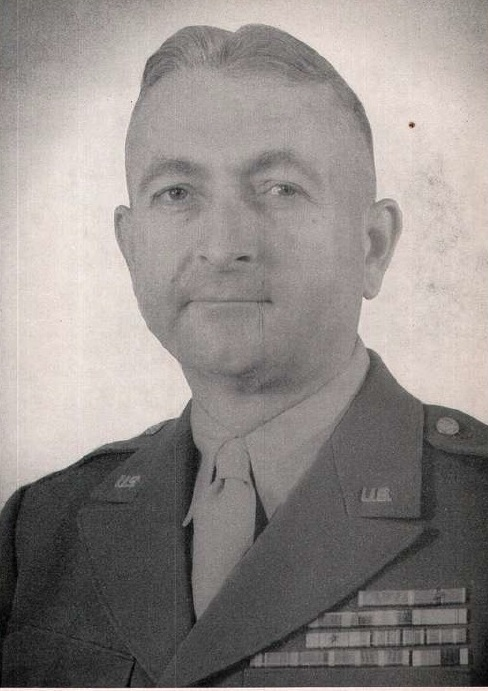
- McConnell as assistant division commander of the 8th Infantry Division in 1950
- Born: 21 June 1898; Cicero, Indiana, US
- Died: 23 August 1981 (aged 83); Cape Coral, Florida, US
- Burial place: Arlington National Cemetery
- Education: Purdue University; United States Army Command and General Staff College; Golden Gate College
- Spouse(s): Paulena Marie Scott (m. 1921–1957) Catherine Florence Baker (m. 1957–1981)
- Children: 2
- Military career
- Service: United States Army
- Service years: 1918; 1921–1957
- Rank: Brigadier General
- Service number: 014873
- Units: US Army Coast Artillery Corps; US Army Field Artillery Branch
- Commands: Battery C, 55th Coast Artillery Regiment; Anti-Aircraft Artillery Command; 32nd Anti-Aircraft Artillery Brigade; Philippine Ground Forces Command; 2nd Transportation Major Port; 5th Infantry Division; 8th Infantry Division; Fort Jackson; Fort Gordon; 34th Anti-Aircraft Artillery Brigade
- Wars: World War I World War II; Korean War
- Awards: Legion of Merit (2); Bronze Star Medal (2); Air Medal

Frank C. McConnell (21 June 1898 – 23 August 1981) was a career officer in the United States Army. He served in 1918 and from 1921 to 1957, and was a veteran of World War II and the Korean War. McConnell attained the rank of brigadier general, and his commands included the 5th Infantry Division, the 8th Infantry Division, and the post at Fort Jackson, South Carolina. His awards included the Legion of Merit, Bronze Star Medal, and Air Medal.

A native of Cicero, Indiana, McConnell was raised and educated in Sheridan, Indiana and served in the Student Army Training Corps during World War I. He graduated from Purdue University in 1920 and received a commission in the United States Army in 1921. Assigned to the Coast Artillery, he served at coastal defense posts in New Jersey, New York, and the Philippines. During World War II, he served in both the European and Pacific theaters, and commanded Coast Artillery units and port facilities. He served in the post-war Occupation of Japan as assistant division commander of the 24th Infantry Division, and he returned to the United States in 1948.

In the late 1940s and early 1950s, McConnell commanded the 5th Infantry Division, 8th Infantry Division, and the posts at Fort Jackson and Fort Gordon. During the Korean War, he served first as assistant division commander of the 25th Infantry Division, then as a member of the United Nations panel that negotiated the Korean Armistice Agreement. After his service in Korea, his assignments included command of the post at Fort Stewart and the 34th Anti-Aircraft Artillery Brigade. He retired in 1957.

In retirement, McConnell resided in Fort Lauderdale, Florida and Cape Coral, Florida. He died in Cape Coral on 23 August 1981 and was buried at Arlington National Cemetery.

== Early life ==
Frank Charles McConnell was born in Cicero, Indiana on 21 June 1898, the son of Charles M. McConnell and Mary Elizabeth "Lizzie" (Burris) McConnell. He was raised and educated in Sheridan, Indiana, and attended the elementary school in Bakers Corner, Indiana through the eighth grade. In 1912 he began attendance at Sheridan High School, from which he graduated in 1916. After completing high school, McConnell enrolled at Purdue University.

In October 1918, McConnell joined the Student Army Training Corps as a private. The Armistice of November 11, 1918 ended World War I before McConnell's training was complete and he was discharged in December. In 1920, McConnell received his Bachelor of Science in Agriculture (BSA) degree. While in college, he became a member of the Sigma Nu and Alpha Zeta fraternities. He was also a member of the Emersonian Literary Society, Horticulture Society, and Order of the Iron Key (a secret honor society), and a reporter for the Purdue Agriculturist magazine.

=== Family ===
In 1921, McConnell married Paulena Marie Scott, a fellow member of Purdue's Class of 1920. The McConnells were the parents of two sons; they divorced in October 1957, and she died in 1969. At the end of October 1957, McConnell married Major Catherine Florence Baker, a member of the Army Nurse Corps.

== Start of career ==
After graduating, McConnell was employed by the U.S. government as the manager of a farm on the Camp Knox, Kentucky army base, a First World War enterprise that produced dairy products, grain, and other crops for military use. The farm was scheduled to be closed at the end of 1921 as the result of post-war troop discharges, and in June McConnell took the competitive examination for an army commission. According to contemporary news accounts, 85 applicants nationwide passed; of 25 Camp Knox applicants, only McConnell attained a passing score. As a result, he was appointed a second lieutenant of Coast Artillery.

After receiving his commission, McConnell served initially at Fort Hancock, New Jersey and Fort Tilden, New York. In July 1925, he was assigned to the 92nd Coast Artillery Regiment (Philippine Scouts) at Fort Mills on the island of Corregidor in Manila Bay. He attended the course for Artillery battery officers at the Fort Monroe, Virginia Field Artillery School from 1929 to 1930, then assumed command of Battery C, 55th Coast Artillery Regiment. In 1931, McConnell's battery won the Knox Trophy, an annual award for gunnery presented to the most proficient army Artillery unit. He attended the United States Army Command and General Staff College from 1936 to 1937, after which he was assigned to Coast Artillery duty at Fort Randolph, Panama. Subsequent assignments included instructor for the Illinois Army National Guard from 1939 to 1940, followed by assignment as executive officer of the Fort Bliss, Texas Anti-Aircraft Artillery Training Center.

== Continued career ==
Following American entry into World War II in December 1941, McConnell's wartime duties included a fact-finding and inspection tour of Anti-Aircraft Artillery sites in Hawaii. This was followed by service as chief of staff for Headquarters, Anti-Aircraft Artillery Command in Richmond, Virginia, after which he was assigned as the organization's commander. In 1945, he was assigned to Headquarters, European Theater of Operations, where he aided in creation of a post-war training program for redeploying soldiers. This was followed by Pacific Theater duty as commander of the 32nd Anti-Aircraft Artillery Brigade. After the August 1945 Surrender of Japan, McConnell served as chief of staff of the Southern Islands Area Command in the Philippines, the organization responsible for disarming and demobilization of surrendering Japanese soldiers. He later served as the organization's deputy commander.

In May 1946, McConnell was assigned as chief of staff and deputy commander of the Philippine Ground Forces Command, the organization responsible for all US Army forces in the Philippines. He became the organization's commander in June, and he remained in this post until May 1947, when he was assigned to Occupation of Japan duty on the staff of Eighth U.S. Army. In June 1947, he was assigned to command of the 2nd Transportation Major Port in Yokohama, the main US military logistical hub for supporting forces in the Western Pacific. In April 1948, he was assigned as assistant division commander of the 24th Infantry Division in Kokura. He returned to the United States in September 1948. McConnell's wartime experience resulted in the award of equivalent credit for attendance at the National War College.

== Later career ==
In October 1948, McConnell was assigned as assistant division commander of the 5th Infantry Division at Fort Jackson, South Carolina. He remained in this position until April 1950, which included temporary duty as an Army Field Forces inspector of training sites nationwide for all components of the U.S. military and deputy director/chief umpire of the "TARHEEL" exercise in North Carolina and the "PORTREX" exercise in the Caribbean. He commanded the 5th Infantry Division in March and April 1950, which was followed by assignment as commander of the post at Fort Jackson. In this position, McConnell was responsible for the first large scale racial desegregation of a US military post when he determined that separate training facilities and cadres for black and white soldiers was inefficient. As part of this effort, McConnell persuaded local newspaper editors that he was merely following President Harry Truman's executive order to integrate the military and asked them not to widely publicize his decision, which was implemented without opposition. In August 1950, McConnell was assigned as interim commander of the 8th Infantry Division at Fort Jackson. When Major General Harry J. Collins assumed command in January 1951, McConnell was assigned as his assistant division commander. In August and September 1951, he performed temporary duty at Fort Bragg, North Carolina as chief umpire of the "Exercise Southern Pines" maneuver and war games event. Following this duty, he was assigned to command the post at Fort Gordon, Georgia.

In January 1952, McConnell was assigned as assistant division commander of the 25th Infantry Division, then performing Korean War duty in South Korea. In May 1952, McConnell was selected to take the place of Vice Admiral C. Turner Joy on the five-man United Nations delegation that negotiated the Korean Armistice Agreement, which was signed in July 1953; delegation member William Kelly Harrison Jr. succeeded Joy as the lead negotiator, and McConnell took Harrison's place as a delegation member. After returning to the United States, he served in the office of the army's assistant chief of staff for logistics (G-4) until February 1953, when he was appointed to the Review Board Council, an army panel that oversaw the functions of several personnel-related boards, including those related to discharges, awards, disability, and correction of records. In December 1953, he was transferred to West Germany, where he commanded the 34th Anti-Aircraft Artillery Brigade.

In March 1955, McConnell was among the former Review Board Council members who were questioned by United States Senate investigators about the circumstances that led to the discharge of Major Irving Peress after Peress was accused by Senator Joseph McCarthy of being a communist sympathizer. In July 1956, he returned to the United States and was assigned to command of the post at Fort Stewart, Georgia. He served again on the Review Board Council until July 1957, when he was assigned to Headquarters, Sixth U.S. Army at the Presidio of San Francisco while his retirement was pending. He retired on 30 September 1957.

In 1960, McConnell received a Bachelor of Business Administration (BBA) degree from Golden Gate College, and he graduated cum laude. In retirement, he was a resident of Fort Lauderdale, Florida. He died in Cape Coral, Florida on 23 August 1981. McConnell was buried at Arlington National Cemetery.

== Works by ==
- "Harbor Defense Days at Fort Hancock". The Coast Artillery Journal. Washington, DC: United States Coast Artillery Association. August 1923. pp. 186–188 – via Google Books.
- "Winning the 1931 Knox Trophy with Battery C, 55th Coast Artillery (TD)". The Coast Artillery Journal. Washington, DC: United States Coast Artillery Association. January–February 1932. pp. 17–18 – via Google Books.
- "Field Training of the 61st C. A. (AA)" (PDF). The Coast Artillery Journal. Washington, DC: United States Coast Artillery Association. March–April 1936. pp. 107–109.
- "Fort Bliss Anti-Mechanized Target Range". The Coast Artillery Journal. Washington, DC: United States Coast Artillery Association. September–October 1941. pp. 454–456 – via Google Books.

== Awards ==
McConnell was a recipient of the Legion of Merit with oak leaf cluster, Bronze Star Medal with oak leaf cluster, and Air Medal. Among his other awards were the World War I Victory Medal, American Defense Service Medal, Asiatic–Pacific Campaign Medal with one battle star, European–African–Middle Eastern Campaign Medal, American Campaign Medal, World War II Victory Medal, Army of Occupation Medal, and from the Philippines the Philippine Liberation Medal.

== Dates of rank ==
McConnell's dates of rank were:

- Private, October – December 1918
- Second Lieutenant, 25 November 1921
- First Lieutenant, 26 June 1927
- Captain, 1 August 1935
- Major, 1 July 1940
- Lieutenant Colonel (Army of the United States), 1 January 1942
- Brigadier General (Army of the United States), 7 October 1943
- Lieutenant Colonel, 1 November 1944
- Colonel, 11 March 1948
- Brigadier General, 5 April 1953
- Brigadier General (Retired), 30 September 1957
