= Lieder line by line =

Lieder line by line (subtitled Lieder line by line and word for word) is a book by Lois Phillips, a professor of song at the Royal Academy of Music. The book gives the full texts of most of the important lieder by Beethoven, Schubert, Schumann, Wagner, Brahms, Wolf, Mahler and Strauss. Under each line of the original German is a literal word-by-word translation, while alongside is a prose transliteration of the verse. Phillips thus combines two of the common strategies used in song translation.

First published in 1979 and updated in 1996, it is considered indispensable by many Anglophone students of lieder. It is cited in the bibliography of the Harvard Dictionary of Music article on the lied form, and it is a frequently cited source of English translations of the popular German lieder and has been endorsed by such authorities as Dame Janet Baker.
