= Boxley, Indiana =

- Unincorporated community and Census-designated place
- Location within Indiana Location within the United States
- Coordinates: 40°10′04″N 86°10′45″W
- Country: United States
- State: Indiana
- County: Hamilton
- Township: Adams
- Established: 1836
- Elevation: 922 ft (281 m)
- ZIP code: 46069
- Area codes: 317/463
- FIPS code: 18-06904
- GNIS feature ID: 2830393

Boxley is an unincorporated community in Adams Township, Hamilton County, Indiana.

== History ==
Boxley was laid out in 1836 by Addison and Thomas P. Boxley. The first store in Adams Township, and the first post office, were established in Boxley. The post office at Boxley was established in 1837, and remained in operation until it was discontinued in 1907.

== Demographics ==
The United States Census Bureau delineated Boxley as a census designated place in the 2022 American Community Survey.
