= Hinkle Creek (Indiana) =

Stream in Indiana, USA

Coordinates: 40°5′37″N 86°4′24″W

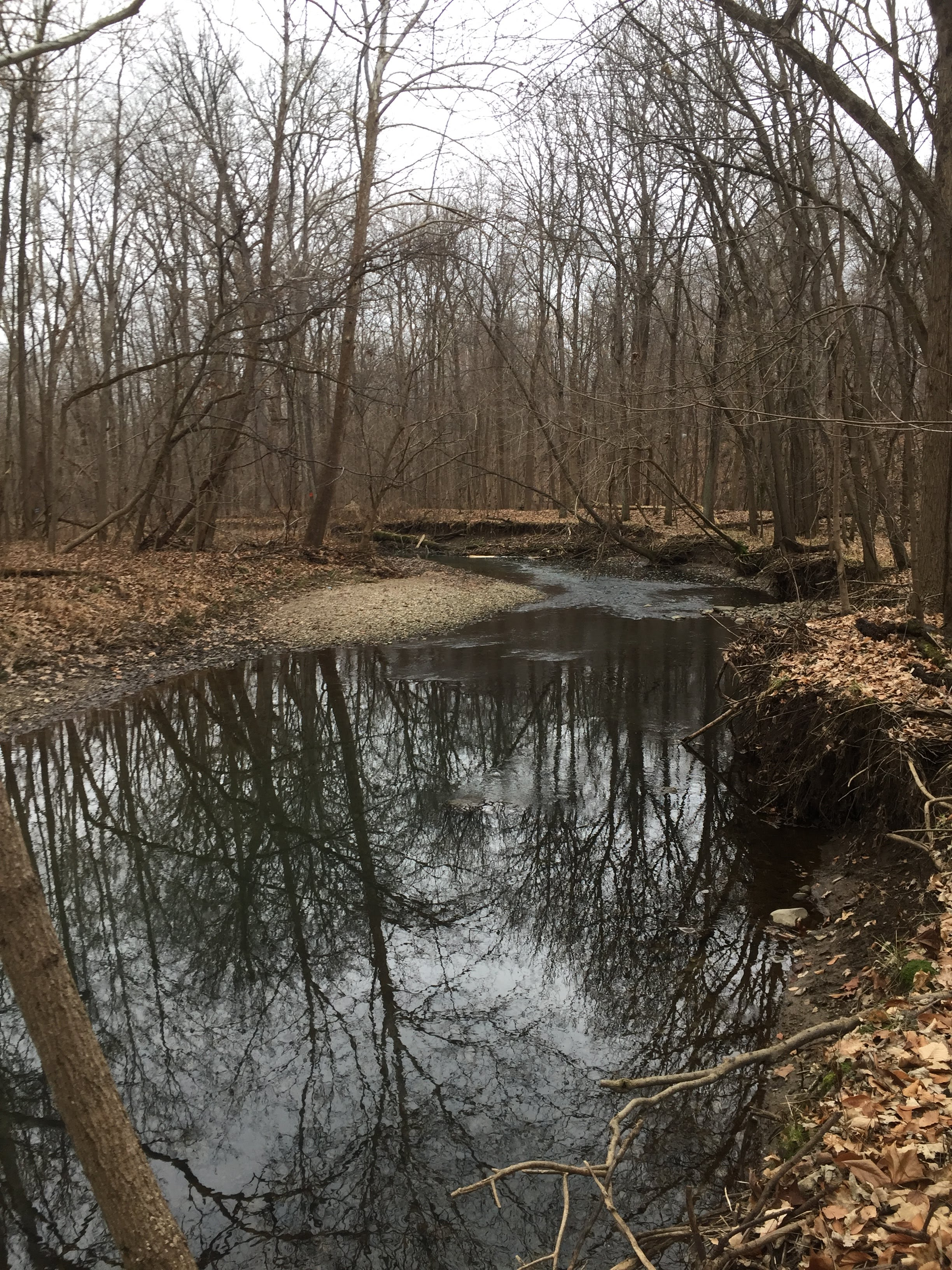
Hinkle Creek, downstream of 216th St., Noblesville, Indiana.

Hinkle Creek is a stream in Indiana which empties into Morse Reservoir. Via Cicero Creek, the outlet of Morse Reservoir, it is part of the White River watershed, and thence the Wabash, Ohio, and Mississippi rivers.

Quaker settlers established Hinkle Creek Church in 1836 near the stream. Other settlers also established communities in the area. Two mills were built on the creek in Deming, Indiana. The first mill was known as Cook's mill, and it existed for a number of years between 1833 and 1865. In 1865, the second mill, known as S. & G. mill, was built near or on the site of Cook's mill.
