= C. Turner Joy =

US Navy admiral in World War II and the Korean War

Charles Turner Joy
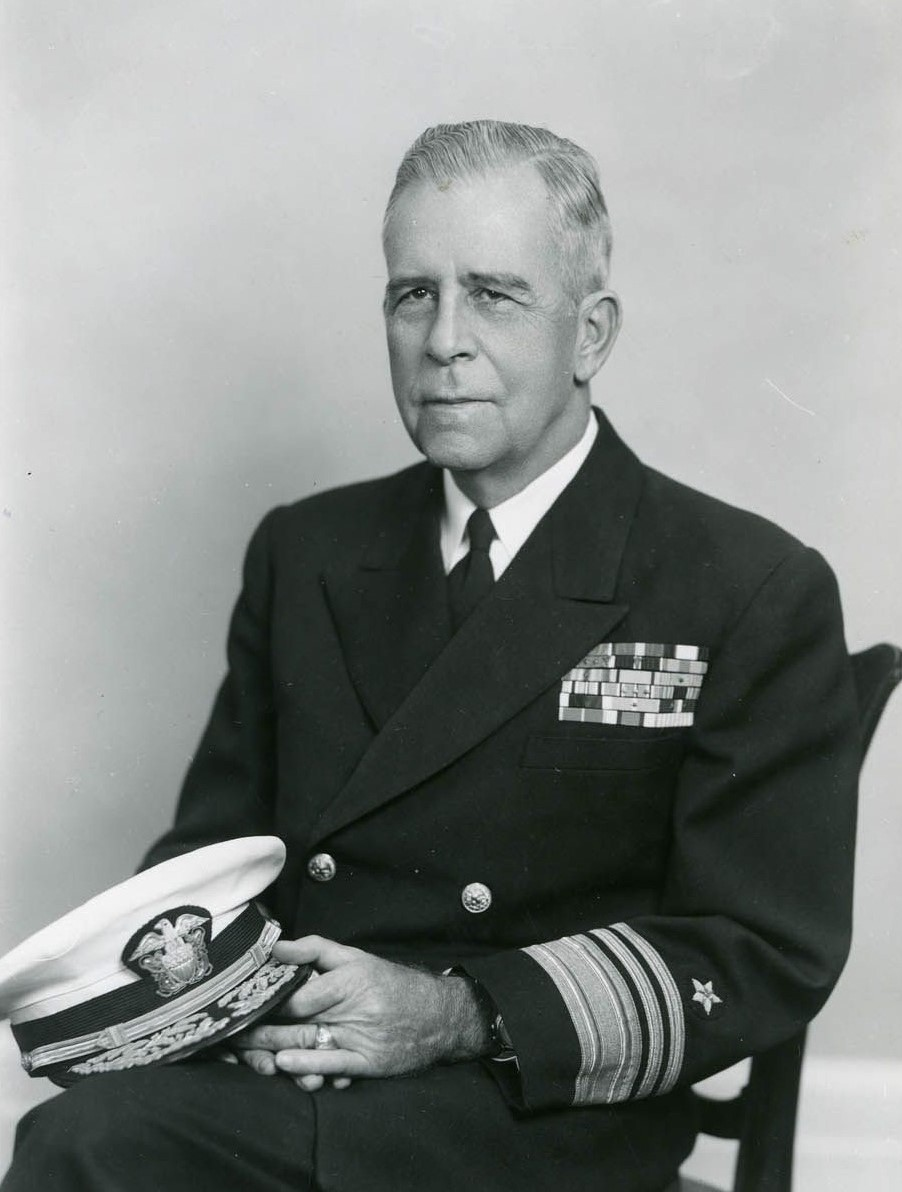
- Joy as Superintendent of the United States Naval Academy, 1952
- Born: February 17, 1895; St. Louis, Missouri, U.S.
- Died: June 6, 1956 (aged 61); San Diego, California, U.S.
- Burial place: United States Naval Academy Cemetery
- Military career
- Allegiance: United States
- Branch: United States Navy
- Service years: 1916–1954
- Rank: Vice admiral
- Commands: USS Litchfield; USS Louisville
- Conflicts: World War I; World War II; Korean War
- Awards: Distinguished Service Cross; Navy Distinguished Service Medal; Army Distinguished Service Medal; Legion of Merit (4); Bronze Star

Charles Turner Joy (17 February 1895 – 6 June 1956) was an admiral of the United States Navy during World War II and the Korean War. During the last years of his career, while fighting leukemia, he served as Superintendent of the Naval Academy. The destroyer USS Turner Joy (DD-951) was named for him.

== Early life ==
C. Turner Joy was born in St. Louis, Missouri, on February 17, 1895. Commissioned as an ensign in the Navy upon graduation from the United States Naval Academy in 1916, he served in the battleship USS Pennsylvania (BB-38) for more than four years, including the U.S. participation in World War I.

== Interwar period ==
In 1923, after receiving a graduate education in engineering, he began two years as Aide and Flag Lieutenant to Commander, Yangtze Patrol. This was followed by a tour as executive officer of the Asiatic Fleet destroyer USS Pope (DD-225), an assignment with the Bureau of Ordnance, sea duty in the battleship USS California (BB-44), and service at the Naval Mine Depot at Yorktown, Virginia. In the mid-1930s, Lieutenant Commander Joy was commanding officer of the destroyer USS Litchfield (DD-336) and was on the staff of Commander Destroyers, Battle Force. From 1937 to 1940, Commander Joy was an instructor at the Naval Academy. He then became executive officer of the heavy cruiser USS Indianapolis (CA-35).

== World War II ==
In 1941, Captain Joy was Operations Officer for Commander Scouting Force, Pacific Fleet. For several months after the United States entered World War II in December, he helped to plan and execute combat operations against Japan. He commanded the heavy cruiser USS Louisville (CA-28) from September 1942 to June 1943 during which he was active in the Aleutians and South Pacific war theatres. After an important war plans tour in Washington, DC, Rear Admiral Joy became commander of a cruiser division, leading it through nearly a year and a half of intense combat service against the Japanese Navy.

== Postwar and Korean War ==
Commanding an amphibious group when Japan capitulated in August 1945, Joy was soon assigned to duty in China. He was in charge of the Naval Proving Ground at Dahlgren, Virginia, in 1946 to 1949 and was then sent back to the Western Pacific to become Commander Naval Forces, Far East. Vice Admiral Joy held that position until mid-1952, directing much of the Navy's effort during the first two years of the Korean War. From July 1951 to May 1952, he was also the senior United Nations Delegate to the Korean Armistice talks; he was replaced as delegation chair by member William Kelly Harrison Jr. and as a member by Frank C. McConnell. His experience in this role led him to write a book, How Communists Negotiate. In the book, he detailed a number of different tactics that were used during the talks to delay, frustrate, and create useful propaganda for the North Koreans. His observations included the fact that the communists would set shorter chairs for the UN delegates so that the communists would tower over the UN delegates in propaganda photographs. He said "the recall of General MacArthur gave further reason for the Communists to believe we were a 'paper tiger'."

His final assignment was as Superintendent of the U.S. Naval Academy.

== Last years and legacy ==
Retiring in July 1954, Admiral Joy subsequently made his home in La Jolla, California. He died at the U.S. Naval Hospital in San Diego, California on 6 June 1956. He is interred at the United States Naval Academy Cemetery.

The destroyer USS Turner Joy (DD-951), 1959–1991, was named in honor of Admiral Joy. Turner Joy Road at the Naval Academy is also named in his honor.

== Decorations ==
Vice Admiral Charles Turner Joy's ribbon bar:

1st Row	Distinguished Service Cross		
2nd Row	Navy Distinguished Service Medal	Army Distinguished Service Medal	Legion of Merit w/ "V" Device and three stars
3rd Row	Bronze Star Medal w/ "V" Device	Mexican Service Medal	World War I Victory Medal w/ Escort Clasp
4th Row	China Service Medal	American Defense Service Medal w/ Atlantic Clasp	American Campaign Medal
5th Row	Asiatic-Pacific Campaign Medal w/ three bronze service stars	World War II Victory Medal	Navy Occupation Service Medal
6th Row	National Defense Service Medal	Korea Service Medal w/ one service star	Philippine Liberation Medal w/ two stars
7th Row	Order of British Empire	Order of the Cloud and Banner, 4th Class (Republic of China)	United Nations Korea Medal

== See also ==
- List of superintendents of the United States Naval Academy
- JMSDF-After World War II, new Japanese Navy since 1954.

Academic offices
Preceded by Harry W. Hill	Superintendent of United States Naval Academy; 1952–1954	Succeeded by Walter F. Boone
