= Indiana Academy =

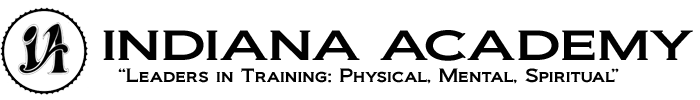

Location
- 24815 State Road 19; Cicero, Hamilton County, Indiana 46034; United States; 40.148264°N 86.011097°W

Information
- Type: Private school
- Motto: Corpus, Mens, Spiritus
- Established: 1902
- Faculty: 18
- Grades: 9-12
- Enrollment: 129
- Affiliation: Seventh-day Adventist Church
- Website: iasda.org

Indiana Academy also known as IA is a Seventh-day Adventist secondary school located in Cicero, Indiana, United States. Indiana Academy is owned and operated by the Indiana Conference of Seventh day Adventists and is one of many other Adventist secondary educational institutions. It is a part of the Seventh-day Adventist education system, the world's second-largest Christian school system.

== See also ==
- List of Seventh-day Adventist secondary schools
- Seventh-day Adventist education
