= USS Turner Joy =

Forrest Sherman-class destroyer of the United States Navy

Coordinates: 47°33′50″N 122°37′19″W

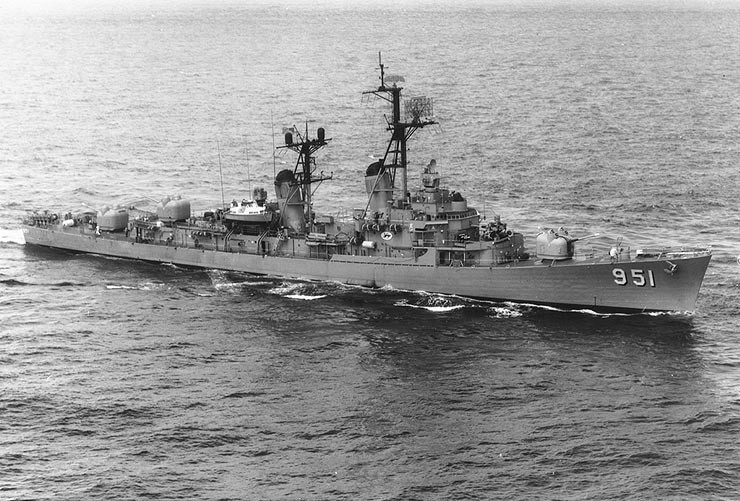
- USS Turner Joy underway at sea on 9 May 1964.

History

United States
- Namesake: Admiral Charles Turner Joy
- Ordered: 27 January 1956
- Builder: Puget Sound Bridge and Dredging Company
- Laid down: 30 September 1957
- Launched: 5 May 1958
- Acquired: 27 July 1959
- Commissioned: 3 August 1959
- Decommissioned: 22 November 1982
- Stricken: 13 February 1990
- Motto: Esse Quam Videri; ("To be, rather than to seem")
- Status: Donated as a museum and memorial to the Bremerton Historic Ships Association and berthed at Bremerton, Washington on 10 April 1991.
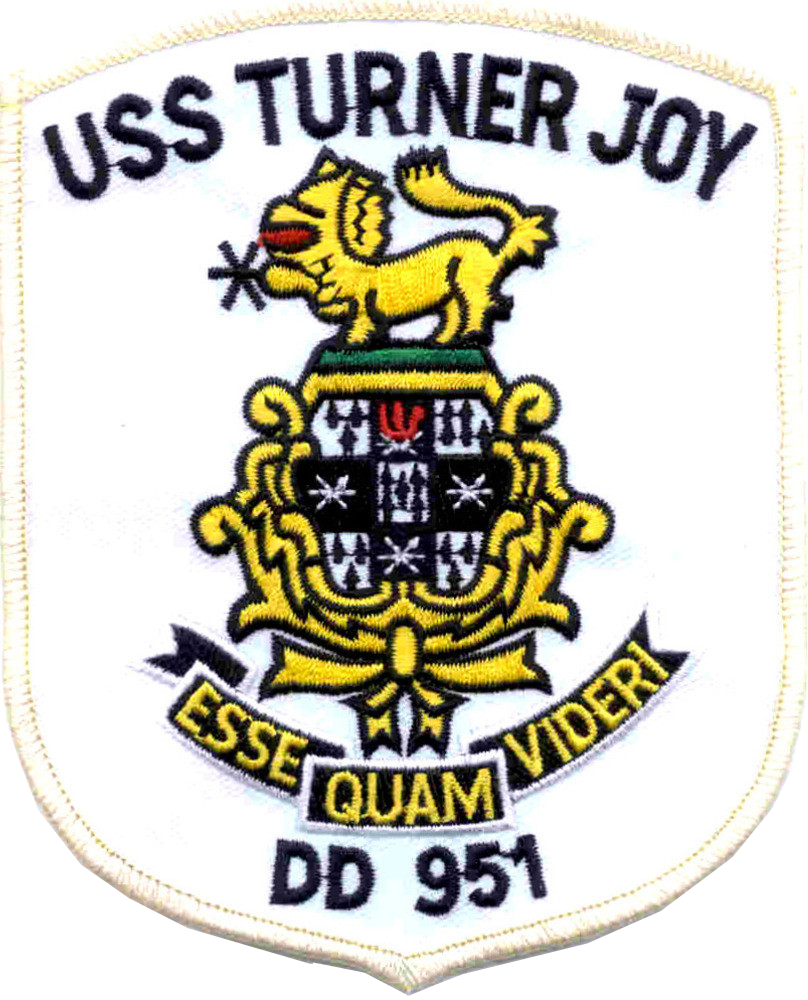
- Badge

General characteristics
- Class & type: Forrest Sherman-class destroyer
- Displacement: 2,800 tons standard, 4,050 tons full load
- Length: 407 ft (124 m) waterline, 418 ft (127 m) overall
- Beam: 45 ft (14 m)
- Draft: 22 ft (6.7 m)
- Propulsion: 4 × 1,200 psi (8.3 MPa) Babcock & Wilcox boilers, Westinghouse steam turbines; 70,000 shp (52 MW); 2 × shafts
- Speed: 32.5 knots (60.2 km/h; 37.4 mph)
- Range: 4,500 nmi. at 20 knots; (8,300 km at 37 km/h)
- Complement: 15 officers, 218 men
- Armament: 3 × 5 in (127 mm)/54 caliber dual purpose Mk 42 guns; 4 × 3 in (76 mm)/50 caliber Mark 33 anti-aircraft guns; 2 × mark 10/11 hedgehogs; 6 × 12.75 in (324 mm) Mark 32 torpedo tubes

USS Turner Joy (DD-951) is one of 18 Forrest Sherman-class destroyers of the United States Navy. She was named for Admiral Charles Turner Joy USN (1895–1956). Commissioned in 1959, she spent her entire career in the Pacific. She participated extensively in the Vietnam War, and was one of the principal ships involved in the Gulf of Tonkin incident as well as serving as destroyer squadron 13 lead flagship under Captain George S. Grove and Commander Robert Huntley Pidgeon, litigated and inspired the Vietnam Paris Peace Accords, War Powers Resolution of 1973 and ended the U.S. involvement in the Vietnam War.

Decommissioned in 1982, she is now a museum ship in Bremerton, Washington.

== Construction and commissioning ==
Turner Joy was built by the Puget Sound Bridge and Dredging Company of Seattle and commissioned at Puget Sound Naval Shipyard in Bremerton, Washington. Her keel was laid on 30 September 1957. She was launched on 5 May 1958, sponsored by Mrs. C. Turner Joy, and was commissioned on 3 August 1959.

== Pre-Vietnam War operational duty ==
Following a pre-shakedown goodwill cruise to Central and South American ports and shakedown out of San Diego, Turner Joy began, early in 1960, duty as flagship both of Destroyer Squadron 13 (DesRon 13) and Destroyer Division 131 (DesDiv 131). Based at Long Beach, California, she formed part of an antisubmarine warfare (ASW) task group built around USS Hornet. She conducted exercises along the California coast until 17 May 1960, when she sailed with the task group for the western Pacific.

After stops at Pearl Harbor and Apra, Guam, she stood air-sea rescue duty near the Marianas for President Dwight D. Eisenhower's flight to visit several Asian nations. After returning to Apra briefly, the destroyer moved via the Philippines to Bangkok, Thailand. Turner Joy crossed the president's path once more in July 1960, when the Chinese used the latter's visit to Taiwan as a pretext for shelling the islands of Quemoy and Matsu, once again. A tense month of duty with the Taiwan Strait patrol followed as the United States Navy demonstrated America's support for one of her allies. In mid-August 1960, the warship moved north for exercises with 7th Fleet carriers along the coast of Japan. That duty rounded out her first western Pacific deployment, and the destroyer got underway for Yokosuka, Japan, and headed home.

Turner Joy returned to Long Beach on 16 November 1960. Over the next 18 months, she completed an extensive overhaul and participated in numerous 1st Fleet exercises along the California coast. In October 1961, the destroyer was transferred to DesDiv 191 of DesRon 19 and assumed duty as flagship for both. On 2 June 1962, she stood out of Long Beach with an ASW task group built around Hornet. On her way to the Far East, the warship participated in exercises with Amphibious Squadron 5 in the Hawaiian Islands. Later, she joined the screen of USS Hancock, operating off the southern coast of Honshū, Japan.

Her second deployment to the Orient was characterized by a series of exercises with ships of the 7th Fleet and of allied navies. Areas of operations included the Sea of Japan, the Pacific east of Japan, and the South China Sea. After a final series of drills conducted with USS Bon Homme Richard, the destroyer completed that tour of duty at Yokosuka, Japan, early in December. On 7 June, she headed back to the United States where she arrived on 21 June. The ensuing 14 months brought another overhaul as well as further 1st Fleet exercises in the waters along the west coast. Those evolutions continued into 1964; and, in March, the destroyer began preparations for overseas movement.

== Gulf of Tonkin incident ==
On 13 March 1964, Turner Joy departed Long Beach to embark upon her most celebrated tour of duty in the Far East. The third western Pacific deployment of her career began routinely enough. After calling at Pearl Harbor on her way west, the destroyer joined a task group built around USS Kitty Hawk for operations in the Philippine Sea, followed by a cruise through the South China Sea to Japan. Further training operations and port visits ensued, as the deployment continued peacefully. During late July 1964, Turner Joy, while attached to a carrier task group built around USS Ticonderoga, began making "watch dog" patrols off the coast of Vietnam where a guerrilla war had been raging at varying levels of intensity since the end of World War II.

In the afternoon of 2 August 1964, USS Maddox, engaged in a DESOTO patrol, called for assistance when three Vietnam People's Navy (VPN) P 4-class torpedo boats from the 135th Torpedo Squadron attacked her. As Maddox engaged the boats, firing over 280 five-inch shells, the contact was broken, and each combatant withdrew from the contact. While retreating to the North Vietnamese coastline, the three torpedo boats were attacked by four Navy F-8 Crusader jets from Ticonderoga which fired rockets and strafed with 20mm cannon fire, damaging two torpedo boats and leaving one boat in apparently sinking condition. Meanwhile, Turner Joy raced to Maddox to provide additional surface strength. By the time she reached Maddox, the torpedo boats were no longer in the area.

On 3 August 1964, the Turner Joy was ordered to accompany the Maddox for another DESOTO mission, on 4 August Turner Joy's radar screens picked up a number of what appeared to be small, high-speed surface craft approaching, but at extreme range. As a precaution, the two destroyers called upon Ticonderoga to furnish air support. By nightfall, the unidentified radar echoes suggested that VPN torpedo boats were converging upon the two American warships from the west and south. Turner Joy reported that she sighted one or two torpedo wakes, then rang up full speed, maneuvered radically to evade expected torpedoes, and began firing in the direction of the unidentified blips. Over the next two and a half hours, Turner Joy fired approximately 220 five-inch shells, while planes from Ticonderoga fired at the supposed torpedo boats.

Reports claimed that at least two of those were sunk by direct hits and another pair severely damaged, and that the remaining boats retired rapidly to the north. A sailor in the Gun Director on the USS Maddox, Patrick Park, reviewed radar and sonar records for the next three days after the incident on orders from his superiors. His conclusion, there were no attacks on 4 August 1964 against the Maddox and the Turner Joy. This has been supported by evidence from the Vietnamese since the end of hostilities. In addition, Admiral Moore reported on 7 August 1964 to Admiral Sharpe that "Freak weather effects on radar and overeager sonar men may have accounted for the many reports."

On 1 and 2 July 1966, the three torpedo boats from VPN Torpedo Squadron 135; T-333, T-336, and T-339, which had attacked the USS Maddox on 2 August 1964, came into the Tonkin Gulf again to attack two more US destroyers, only to be promptly sunk by US jets from the aircraft carriers USS Constellation and USS Hancock. Nineteen VPN sailors were taken as prisoner of war from those sunk torpedo boats, and they made it clear that no VPN torpedo boats had been sunk in 1964. It could well have been that bad weather and freakish radar conditions for which the Gulf of Tonkin is famous, caused radar echoes to appear on Turner Joy's screen and prompted her captain and crew to take defensive action in consideration of the events two days earlier.

In any event, the "Tonkin Gulf incident" prompted American retaliation. Constellation joined Ticonderoga off North Vietnam the following day, and together they launched Operation Pierce Arrow, sixty-four sorties against the bases from which the attacks had been launched and against an oil storage depot known to have been used to support those bases. Planes from Constellation hit the VPN bases at Hongay and Loc Chao in the north while Ticonderoga aircraft went after three targets in the south: the motor torpedo boat bases at Quang Khe and Phuc Loi as well as the Vinh oil storage depot. At the last-named target, American planes set fire to 12 of the 14 oil storage tanks sending almost 10 percent of North Vietnam's oil reserves up in smoke. Of more lasting significance both to the warship and the country, however, the incident prompted the United States Congress to pass the Tonkin Gulf Resolution, the legal foundation for the United States to deploy conventional US military forces and directly confront North Vietnam in open warfare; which would ultimately involve the United States in a bloody and costly war in Indochina for the ensuing eight and a half years. Throughout that period, the Turner Joy would serve repeatedly throughout the conflict.

== Vietnam War operations ==
Following the excitement of the first week in August, the destroyer resumed more routine operations in the South China Sea. She concluded her deployment when she reached Long Beach on 2 October—two months to the day since she had rushed to the aid of Maddox. The destroyer conducted normal operations out of Long Beach until 18 December when she entered the naval shipyard for a three-month overhaul. Late in March, she began refresher training out of San Diego. West coast operations occupied her until 10 July, when she departed Long Beach with DesRon 19, bound once again for duty in the Orient. At the end of a 21-day transit, Turner Joy joined USS Coral Sea near the end of the month. During August and the first three weeks of September, the destroyer served both as an escort for the carrier and as a detached radar picket ship.

On 23 September, she moved into the Gulf of Thailand near the west coast of South Vietnam to participate in one of the earliest naval gunfire support missions conducted along that section of the coastline. After a brief respite in Subic Bay for upkeep, the warship returned to the "gunline" in October, this time along South Vietnam's southeastern coast between Cape St. Jacques and Chu Lai. On 25 September, she provided call-fire for American and South Vietnamese forces operating ashore in the vicinity of Chu Lai itself. During the mission, her guns destroyed a number of enemy positions and figured prominently in the repulse of a Viet Cong attack. Near the conclusion of that 24-hour action, a 5-inch round misfired; and, during the ensuing efforts to clear the chamber, the shell detonated. The explosion damaged the gun mount, killed three sailors, and wounded three more. That event forced her departure from the combat zone. After landing the three casualties at Da Nang, Turner Joy set course for Subic Bay in the Philippines. After a week of repairs, the destroyer departed Subic Bay in company with Ticonderoga for screening duty in the South China Sea, followed by port calls at Hong Kong and at Yokosuka, Japan. At the end of the year, she returned to naval gunfire support duty off the coast of South Vietnam.

On 3 January 1966, the destroyer resumed plane guard duty with Ticonderoga in the South China Sea. The destroyer patrolled with the carrier on Yankee Station until 14 January when she headed, via Subic Bay, for Long Beach. Turner Joy arrived home on 1 February and, two weeks later, began a month-long restricted availability. From the completion of her overhaul in March through the end of May, the destroyer remained in Long Beach engaged in upkeep, repairs, and in training the numerous replacements who had reported on board. On 11 June, she put to sea once again to conduct a midshipman training cruise, during which she visited Pearl Harbor, Seattle, and San Francisco. Turner Joy concluded that operation on 29 July when she disembarked the midshipmen at Long Beach. Later that summer, she again visited Seattle in conjunction with that city's annual Seafair celebration. Additional training and upkeep at Long Beach followed and occupied her until the second week in October. At that time, she returned to sea to participate in fleet exercise "Baseline II", after which she proceeded to Long Beach for a series of repairs in preparation for another tour of duty in the western Pacific. Turner Joy stood out of Long Beach on 18 November and—after visits to Pearl Harbor, Midway, and Guam—entered port at Kaohsiung, Taiwan, on 11 December.

Turner Joy's fourth deployment to the western Pacific brought her three tours of duty off the coast of Vietnam and concluded with a visit to Australia. On 15 December, she departed Kaohsiung and headed for the coastline of the II Corps area of South Vietnam. The destroyer reached her zone of operations on the 18th and, for the next month, conducted shore bombardments in support of American and South Vietnamese troops operating ashore. She concluded that assignment on 17 January 1967 and headed for the Philippines. After two weeks of availability at Subic Bay and a five-day liberty visit to Hong Kong, Turner Joy returned to the Vietnamese coast on 10 February. For almost a month, she delivered gunfire support for troops ashore, this time in the I Corps zone of South Vietnam. That duty ended on 3 March, and a nine-day tender availability alongside USS Jason in Sasebo, Japan, followed.

On 21 March, the destroyer resumed station off Vietnam. This time, however, off the coast of North Vietnam. Instead of supporting American and South Vietnamese troops directly through shore bombardments, she did so by interdicting enemy logistical efforts in Operation Sea Dragon. Though primarily directed at the enemy's water-borne logistics, "Sea Dragon" also struck wherever possible at the enemy's overland supply lines. During her 26 days on station engaged in "Sea Dragon" operations, Turner Joy fired on a number of shore targets in addition to an even larger number of enemy waterborne logistics craft. On 7 April, while firing on some enemy craft beached near Cap Mui Ron, the destroyer came under the fire of a North Vietnamese shore battery. During that exchange, she suffered a direct hit on the fantail and a near-miss air burst above the forward mast. The hit astern penetrated the deck to the supply office, damaging records therein as well as pipes and cables in the overhead. Several rounds of 5 inch VT fragmentation projectiles in mount 53 ammunition stowage area also suffered damage and had to be discarded. Shrapnel from near misses wounded a member of Turner Joy's repair party and peppered her bow while the air burst above the forward mast put her air-search radar out of service except for its IFF aspect. The damage, however, was not severe enough to curtail her tour of duty; and she remained on station until relieved by HMAS Hobart on 16 April.

Two days later, the destroyer arrived in Subic Bay, and she entered drydock, soon thereafter, for repairs to her strut bearing, the bow, the peak tank, and her air search radar antenna. Concurrently with this yard work, she conducted a tender availability with USS Piedmont to prepare her for visits to Australia and New Zealand during the forthcoming celebration of the 25th anniversary of the Battle of the Coral Sea. Repairs and availability completed, she stood out of Subic Bay on 24 April in company with USS McKean. En route to Melbourne, the two ships stopped at Manus Island in the Admiralty Islands and at Brisbane, Australia. The ship reached Melbourne on 8 May; and, while she remained there until the 13th, her crew enjoyed Australian hospitality in the city and replied in kind on board. Between 13 and 17 May, she made a rough transit of the Tasman Sea and arrived in Auckland, New Zealand, on the latter date for the second phase of her Coral Sea celebration. She remained in Auckland until 22 May at which time she and McKean put to sea to return to the United States. After a stop at Pago Pago, American Samoa, the two ships rejoined USS Gridley and Maddox on 26 May to reconstitute DesRon 19 for the voyage home. After a brief fueling stop at Pearl Harbor on 2 June, the warships arrived in Long Beach on 8 June. Between June and September, Turner Joy went through a month of post-deployment standdown followed by training operations in the waters off southern California. On 18 September, she arrived at Bremerton, Washington, for a two-month shipyard availability at the Puget Sound Naval Shipyard. In mid-November, she returned to Long Beach and resumed operations along the California coast.

That duty continued until late February 1968 when she entered the Long Beach Naval Shipyard for a restricted availability in preparation for her fifth deployment to the Far East. Turner Joy stood out of Long Beach on 12 March and—after stops at Oahu, Midway, and Guam—arrived in Subic Bay on 4 April. Over the following five months, the destroyer conducted operations along the coast of Vietnam similar to those performed during previous deployments. She delivered naval gunfire support for American and South Vietnamese troops in South Vietnam and conducted "Sea Dragon" patrols along the coast of North Vietnam to interdict enemy waterborne logistics traffic. Her tours of duty on the gunline took her to the I, II and IV Corps areas of South Vietnam. As during previous deployments, she punctuated assignments in the combat zone with visits to Subic Bay and to Buckner Bay, Okinawa, for fuel, supplies, and repairs, as well as to Kaohsiung, Taiwan; and Hong Kong for rest and relaxation. She completed her last tour of duty of the deployment off the Vietnamese coast on 4 September and, after a brief tender availability at Subic Bay, headed homeward on 8 September. Retracing her outward-bound voyage with stops at Guam, Midway, and Pearl Harbor, Turner Joy entered Long Beach on 26 September.

Upon her return to the United States, the warship began preparations for her regular overhaul. She entered the Long Beach Naval Shipyard on 28 November and remained there until late February 1969. When post-overhaul trials ended on 15 March, the ship resumed normal operations out of Long Beach. During April and May, she participated in a 1st Fleet combined ASW/AAW exercise as a part of her refresher training. She completed those operations during the latter half of May; and, after a. brief availability alongside USS Bryce Canyon, she embarked NROTC midshipmen on 5 June for the two-month 1969 summer training cruise. At the end of the cruise, Turner Joy debarked the midshipmen on 1 August and resumed training in the southern California operating area.

On 18 November, she got underway from Long Beach to return to the Orient. Following a four-day layover at Pearl Harbor and brief fuel stops at Midway and Guam, she arrived in Subic Bay on 11 December. After a five-day availability alongside USS Prairie, the destroyer stood out of Subic Bay bound for Danang, South Vietnam, and gunfire support duty off the coast of the I Corps zone. By New Year's Day 1970, she was on her way to Yankee Station to act as plane guard for Task Force (TF) 77 aircraft carriers. On 4 January, she headed back to Subic Bay where she remained until the 18th. She completed another three-week tour on the gunline on 10 February and then shaped a course for Sasebo, Japan, whence she operated until early in March. After a liberty call in Hong Kong, Turner Joy returned to the Vietnamese coast and resumed gunfire support missions until early April. On 3 April, she rendezvoused with USS Shangri-La and then made port calls at Subic Bay and Bangkok, Thailand, before embarking upon her final gunline assignment on 19 April. She returned to Subic Bay on 10 May for a final visit before heading back to the United States on the 17th.

The destroyer arrived back in Long Beach on 1 June and began a three-month restricted availability in the naval shipyard. She completed the availability early in October and began sea trials and training in the southern California operating area. Early in December, Turner Joy reentered the Long Beach Naval Shipyard to be readied for her redeployment to the western Pacific. On 26 January 1971, she stood out of Long Beach on her way to rejoin the 7th Fleet. She entered Subic Bay on 16 February and went into drydock for several days while both her propellers were replaced. On 5 March, she exited Subic Bay for a tour of naval gunfire support duty along the Vietnamese coast. That assignment—carried out along the I Corps-zone coastline near Danang—ended on 2 April; and she headed for Yankee Station and two weeks of plane guard duty with the TF 77 aircraft carriers. Following a five-day port call at Subic Bay, Turner Joy took up position at Yankee Station again on 27 April—this time as escort for the PIRAZ (positive identification and radar advisory zone) ship. She performed that duty until 30 April; then, after three days evading a typhoon, she moved in close to the I Corps shoreline to resume gunfire support duties.

On 14 May, the destroyer shaped a course for Subic Bay. Following a five-day gunfire exercise at the Tabones range, she departed the Philippines to make liberty visits to Bangkok, Thailand, and Hong Kong. In late June, she did another tour of duty on PIRAZ station and provided plane guard services to Kitty Hawk. A brief liberty call at Subic Bay followed; and then, on 30 June, she embarked upon a voyage to Australia and New Zealand. During July, she made visits to the Australian towns of Brisbane and Sydney as well as Auckland, New Zealand. On 26 July Turner Joy got underway for home. She arrived back in Long Beach on 10 August and conducted normal post-deployment evolutions through the remainder of 1971.

In February 1972, the destroyer began an extensive overhaul. Over the ensuing six months, she received entirely new 5 inch 54-caliber gun mounts; and her propulsion plant underwent conversion to enable it to burn Navy distillate fuel. Extensive other modifications, installations, and renovations also took place between February and August. From August to December, she busied herself with various trials and tests at sea, conducted refresher training, and prepared for her next assignment to the Far East. Her voyage west began on 6 December and ended with her arrival at Subic Bay on the 29th. Two days later, she put to sea for her first tour on the gunline. It also proved to be her last. She delivered gunfire support for 28 days, "delivering over 10,000 rounds of accurate fire in support of ground forces in South Vietnam and against enemy targets in North Vietnam". "USS Turner Joy fired the final round of naval gunfire of the war, hitting the beach at 000 GMT, 28 January 1973, scant seconds before the ceasefire went into effect". Then, on 28 January 1973, American participation in the Vietnam War ended with a negotiated ceasefire.

For the remainder of that deployment, Turner Joy participated in a variety of operations—including Operation End Sweep, the removal of American mines from the waters around Haiphong harbor, as well as antisubmarine warfare exercises and carrier operations in the South China Sea. She punctuated those assignments with port visits to Subic Bay; Hong Kong; Kaohsiung, Taiwan; and Sasebo, Japan. On 13 June, she headed home via Yokosuka and arrived in Long Beach on 22 June. She spent the period from then until mid-October engaged in upkeep and a restricted availability. On 17 October, she departed Long Beach and set course for her new home port, San Diego. Upon arrival there, she began normal operations—engineering and gunnery exercises at sea alternated with upkeep in port.

That routine continued until April 1974, at which time she began preparations for her first peacetime deployment to the western Pacific in a decade. She stood out of San Diego on 6 May, reached Pearl Harbor on the 12th, and completed a brief assignment with USS Ranger in the Hawaiian operating area on 24 May. On that day, she departed Oahu and continued her voyage west. Turner Joy arrived in Subic Bay on 4 June and, for the next two months, conducted local operations in company with Ranger. On 1 August, the destroyer departed the Philippines for a goodwill visit to Surabaya, Indonesia. She returned to the Philippines on 31 August and conducted local operations out of Subic Bay for two months before heading homeward on 3 October. The warship arrived in San Diego on 22 October and, after a month of post-deployment leave and upkeep, began a normal schedule of operations in the southern California operating area.

== Post-Vietnam War operations ==
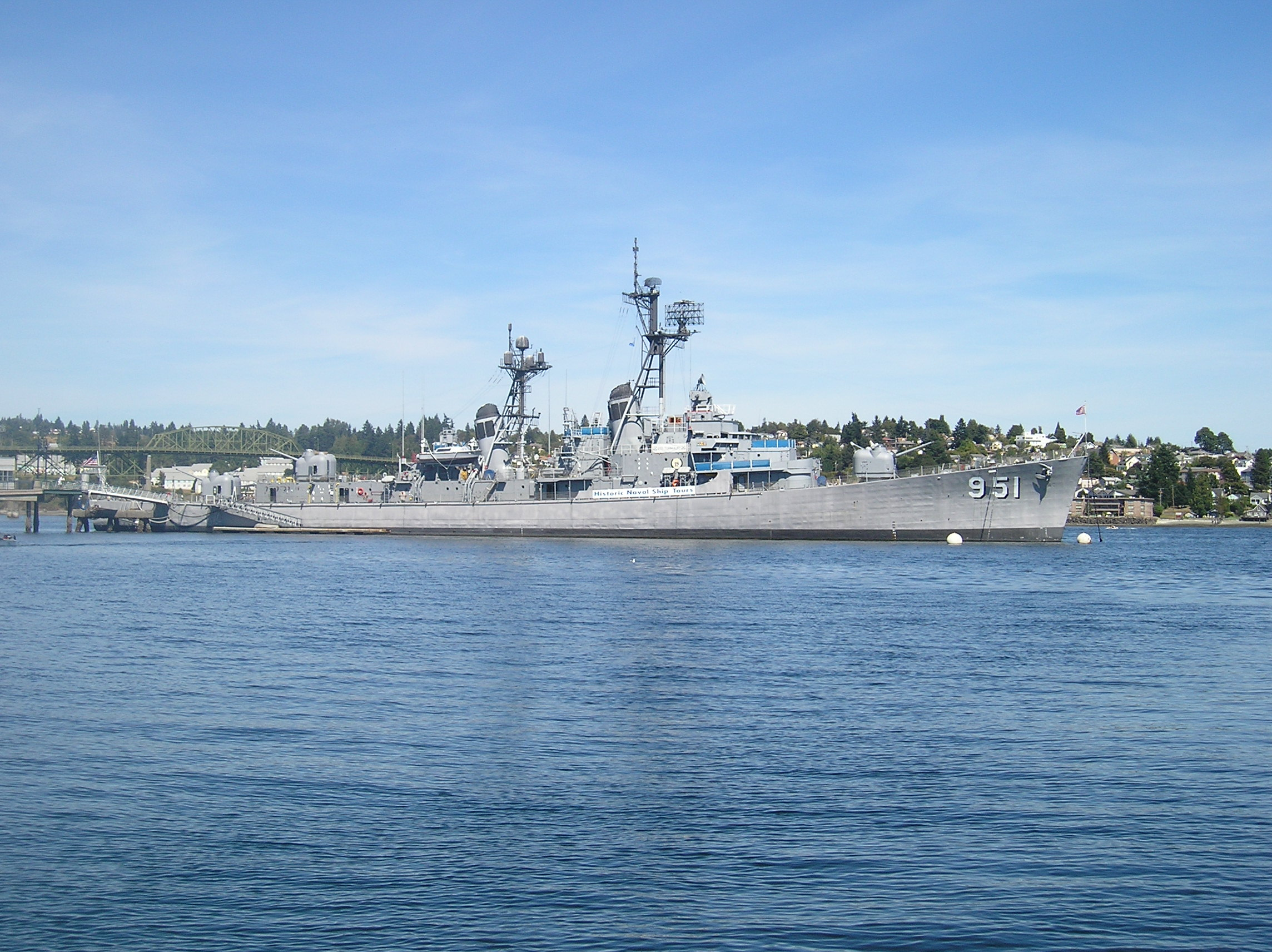
Turner Joy, retired and docked in Bremerton, 2006.

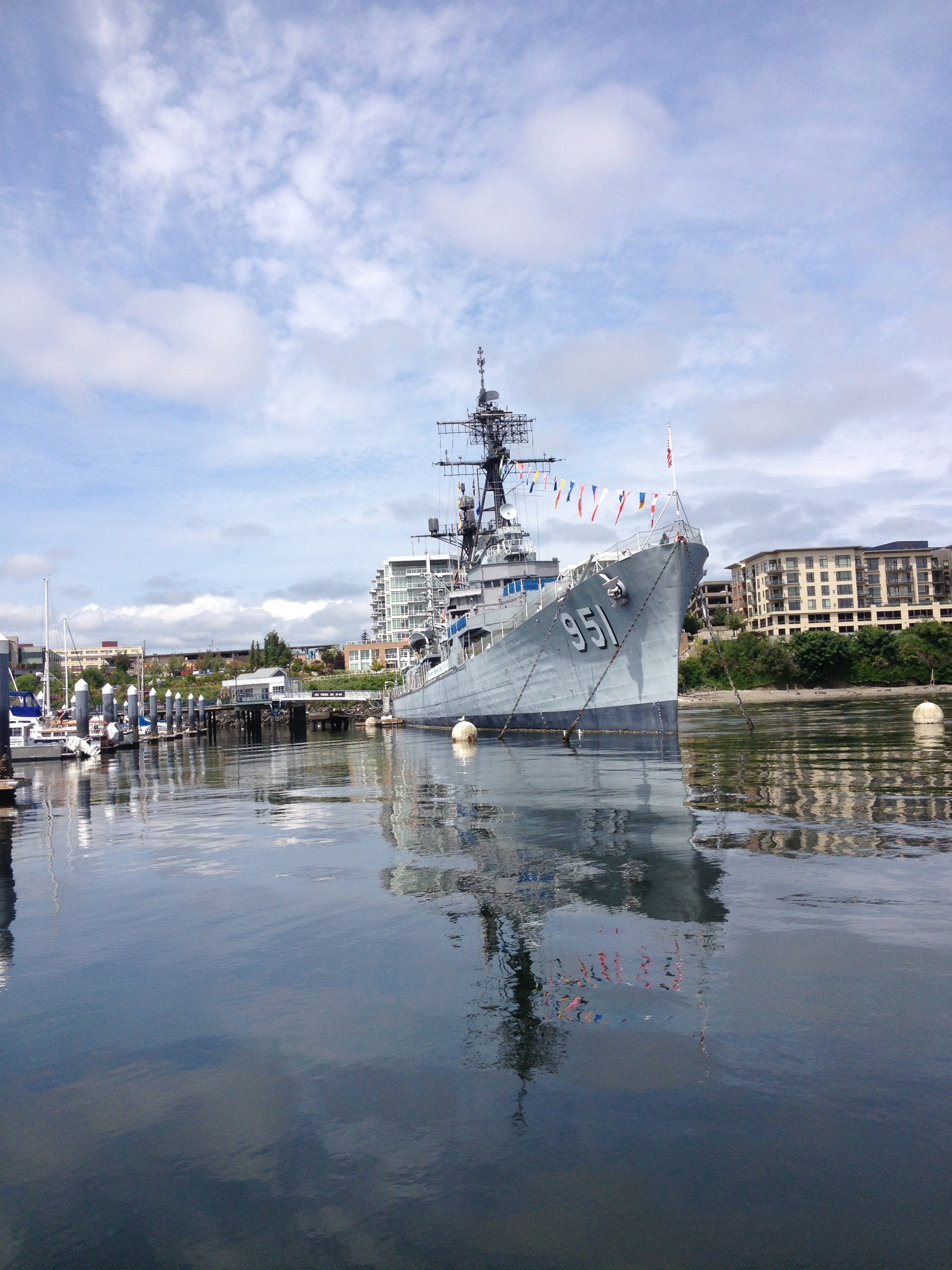
Turner Joy in Bremerton, 2014

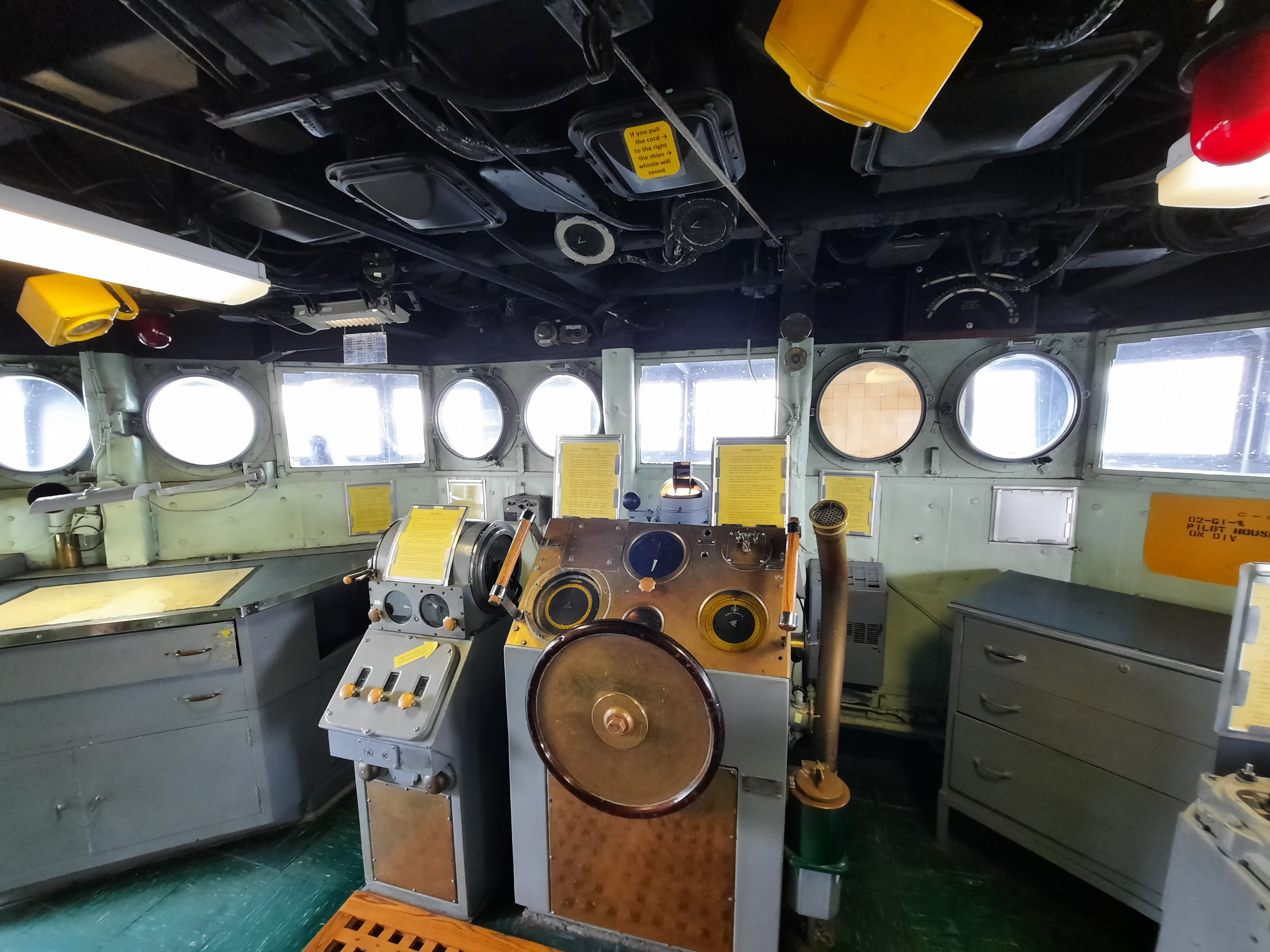
A view of the bridge.

Turner Joy ended 1974 and began 1975 engaged in a rather extensive availability which was completed in mid-April. At the conclusion of that repair period, she resumed operations along the coast of southern California. Refresher training, FleetEx 2-75, and a midshipman training cruise occupied her from April through August. On 2 September, she departed San Diego for the 11th deployment of her career to the western Pacific. However, after a two-week stop at Subic Bay, her western Pacific assignment was transformed into a tour of duty in the Indian Ocean.

On 13 October, she departed Subic Bay in company with USS Midway, USS Fanning, and USS Sacramento bound ultimately for Bandar Abbas, Iran. Along the way, she visited Singapore and Sri Lanka and participated in exercises with the Singaporean Navy. The destroyer arrived in Bandar Abbas on 13 November whence she and her sailing companions participated in the CENTO exercise, "Midlink". During that operation, she joined units of the British, Iranian, and Pakistani navies in practicing a broad spectrum of naval tactics—ASW, AAW, surface engagements, gunnery drills, and missile shoots.

"Midlink" ended on 25 November, and Turner Joy briefly stopped again at Bandar Abbas before heading for the Philippines on 29 November. She arrived back in Subic Bay on 12 December and remained there until 9 January 1976. Routine operations in the Philippines, exercises in the South China Sea and the Sea of Japan—as well as visits to ports in Taiwan and Japan—characterized the remainder of that deployment, which also included a harrowing cruise directly through the center of a typhoon. On 17 March, she stood out of Yokosuka to return to the United States. After stops at Midway and Pearl Harbor, she reentered San Diego harbor on 4 April. Following post-deployment standdown, the destroyer reverted once more to training operations out of San Diego.

On 4 July 1976, the Turner Joy steamed up the San Joaquin River more than 50 miles (80 km) from San Francisco Bay to participate in Stockton's Bicentennial celebrations, making her the first ship-of-the-line to visit that city.

As a result of long years of service in Vietnam and two delays in a scheduled overhaul, however, Turner Joy was unable to successfully complete her Operational Propulsion Plant Examination. This deficiency made it necessary for the ship to spend the remainder of 1976 in port correcting propulsion deficiencies.

After an extended period in dry-dock at Long Beach. the ship went to San Diego mid-1979 for crewing to test the work done. After Engineering Quals were passed the ship was provisioned for a Westpac/South Pac goodwill cruise. The tour consists of going to Hawaii for more Quals in all departments. Then on to the Philippines for repairs on needed items. After 2 weeks there it went on to Hong Kong, Singapore, Australia, & New Zealand. During this time the ship did sea trials with the Australia and New Zealand navies. Upon departing the ship stopped at Pago Pago on the way back to Hawaii before returning to the US. The ship arrived in San Diego in November 1980.

== Fate ==
In 1982, as the new Spruance-class destroyers joined the fleet, the Navy announced the retirement of Turner Joy and her sister ships saying, "...the cost of modernizing them is far greater than the benefits that could be derived from continued service."

Turner Joy was decommissioned 22 November 1982 and struck from the Naval Vessel Register 13 February 1990. The Bremerton Historic Ships Association obtained Turner Joy from the inactive fleet and after refurbishing her and constructing appropriate access to the ship, opened her to the public in 1992 in Bremerton, Washington.

== In popular culture ==
The rock band Turnerjoy took their name from the USS Turner Joy. The band Turnerjoy was active from 1998 to 2003 and is the subject of the 2020 documentary Get Out of Home.
