= Hinkle Creek (Oregon) =

Coordinates: 43.4373°N 123.0942°W

Hinkle Creek is near Roseburg, Oregon. It is the site of the Hinkle Creek Paired Watershed study, which looks at the effects of logging on watersheds.
