= Hinkle Creek (California) =

Creek in Folsom, California

Hinkle Creek is a creek in Folsom, California. It is a tributary of the American River.
