= Rhodes family incident =

1837 US slave escape and later liberation

- Time: 1844
- Location: Hamilton County, Indiana
- Participants: The Rhodes Family (John, Louanne, Lydia), and Singleton Vaughn
- Outcome: Singleton Vaughn had no legal claim over the Rhodes family

The Rhodes family incident was a series of events involving the Rhodes family's escape from slavery in 1837 Missouri. They legally won their freedom from Singleton Vaughn in the 1845 court case Vaughn v. Williams. Vaughn found the family in Hamilton County, Indiana in 1844 and went to court to claim the family as his property. The court found that since the family lived in the free state of Illinois for six months, they were legally free before Vaughn had bought them. Therefore, Vaughn had no legal claim over them.

== History ==
The Rhodes family consisted of John and Louann Rhodes, a married couple, and Lydia Rhodes, their daughter. They were known as the Burkes while enslaved. In 1836, the family was sold from Illinois to Singleton Vaughn in Missouri. In April 1836, after learning that Vaughn planned to sell Louann and Lydia and forcefully separate the family, the Rhodes escaped and returned to Illinois where they were temporarily jailed. Underground Railroad members in Illinois broke the family out of jail. The family subsequently settled in Hamilton County, Indiana.

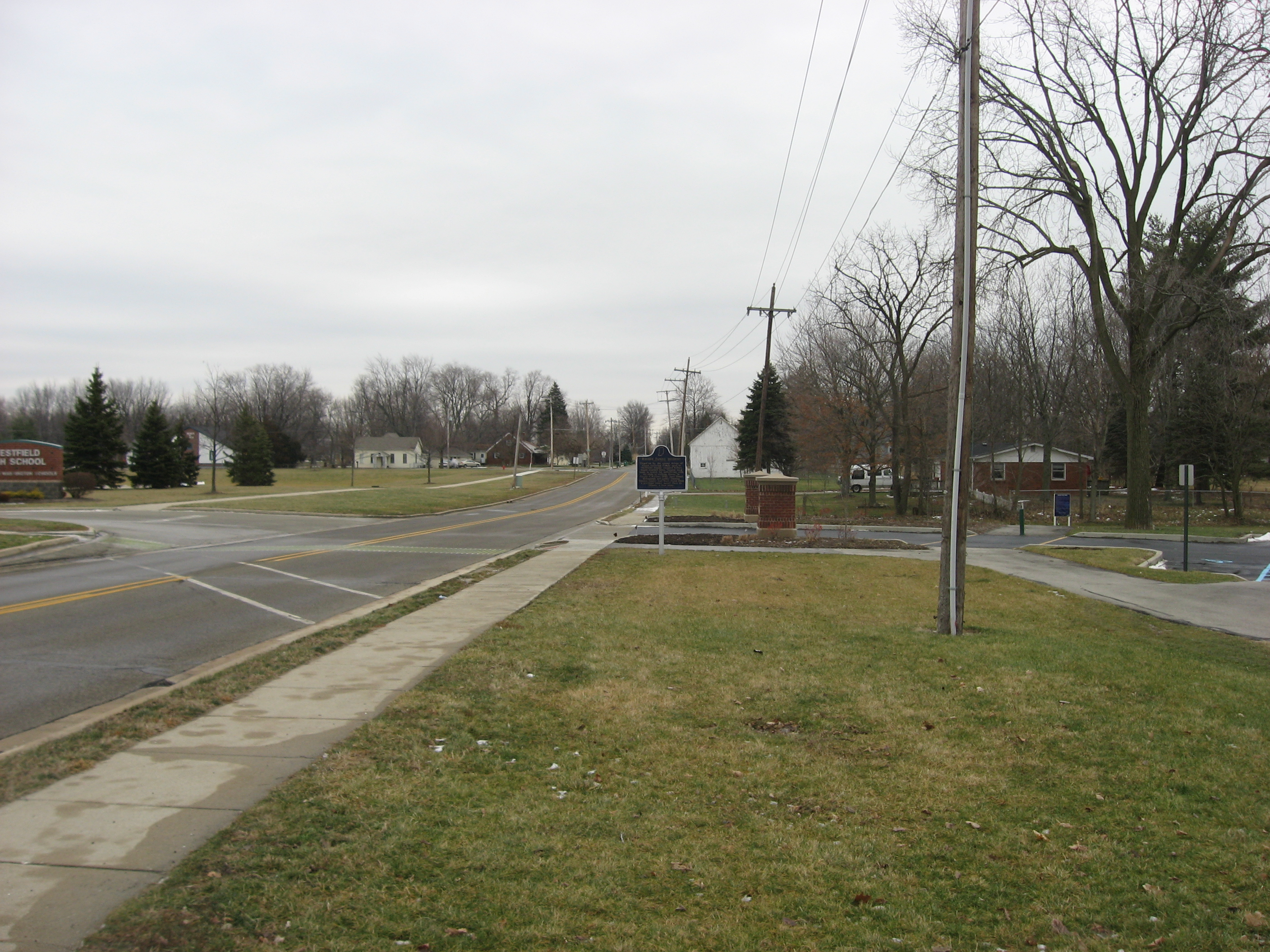
Rhodes Family Incident Historical Marker

In 1844, Singleton Vaughn managed to track them to their home in Hamilton County. After he was found, John Rhodes told Vaughn that a neighbor owed him a $50 debt and asked to go collect it before they left. Vaughn allowed this as the money would legally go to him after finding the Rhodes family. However, the claim was a ruse; Rhodes wanted to call for help from his neighbors.

After a crowd of 150 neighbors had gathered around Vaughn, he tried to leave with the Rhodes to Noblesville, Indiana, where he wanted to go to court to legally re-enslave the family. The neighbors urged them to go to Westfield, Indiana, which was known to have a more slave-friendly court. They successfully steered the carriage to Westfield.

In the case of Vaughn v. Williams of 1845, the jury found the Rhodes family to be legally free because they had lived with their previous enslaver for 6 months in Illinois, a free state, invalidating that owner's claim of ownership. Vaughn had no ownership over the family and could not force them back into slavery.
