= Cicero, Indiana =

- Town
- Town of Cicero
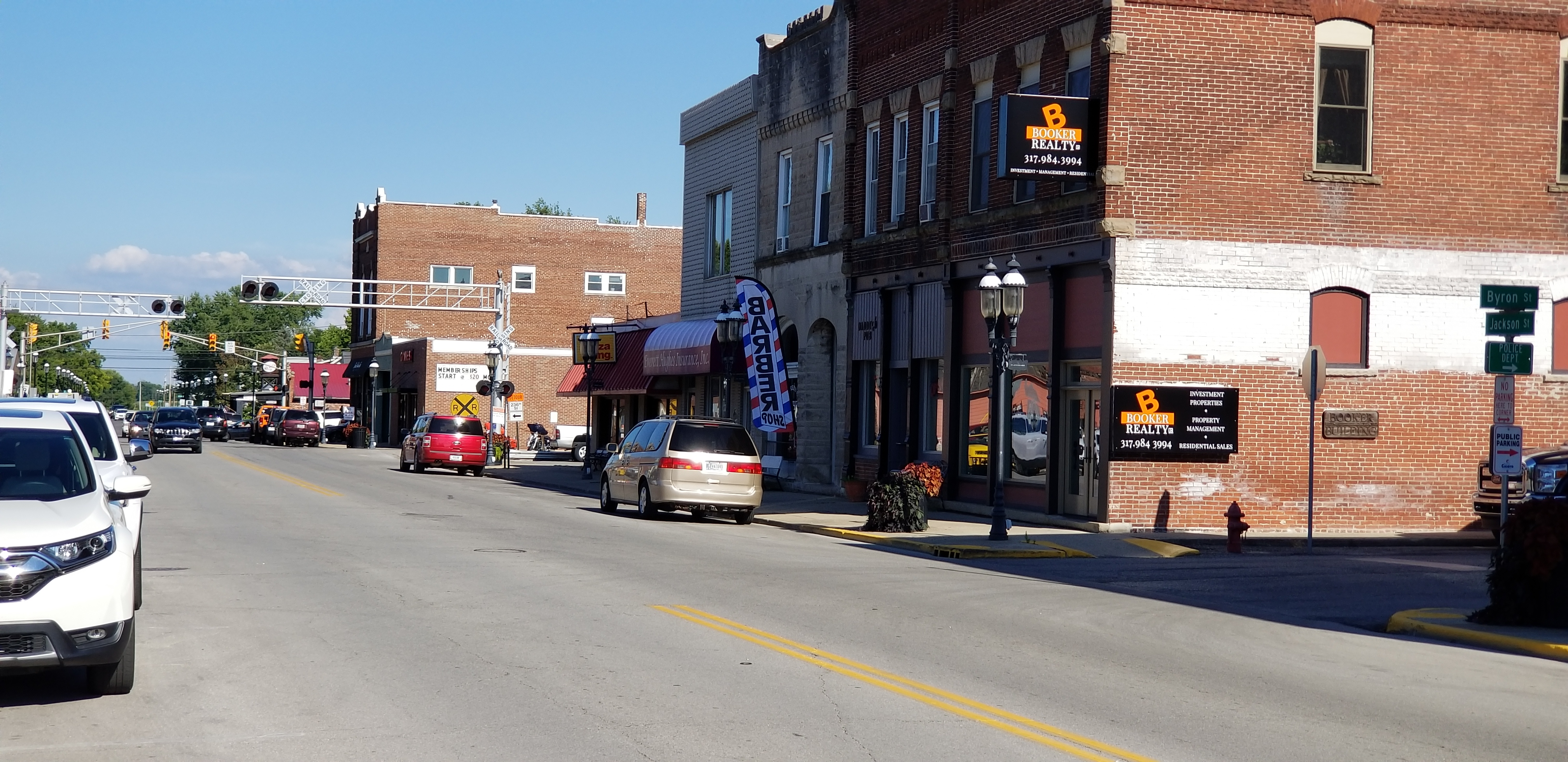
- Cicero has grown around the north end of the Morse Reservoir

- Logo
- Motto: "A Friendly Lakeside Community"
- Location of Cicero in Hamilton County, Indiana.
- Coordinates: 40°07′39″N 86°01′23″W
- Country: United States
- State: Indiana
- County: Hamilton
- Township: Jackson
- Established: 1834
- Named for: Cicero Creek

Government
  - Clerk/Treasurer: Rhonda Gary

Area
  - Total: 2.04 sq mi (5.29 km^{2})
  - Land: 1.63 sq mi (4.22 km^{2})
  - Water: 0.41 sq mi (1.07 km^{2})
- Elevation: 810 ft (250 m)

Population (2020)
  - Total: 5,301
  - Density: 3,255/sq mi (1,256.6/km^{2})
- Time zone: UTC-5 (EST)
  - Summer (DST): UTC-4 (EDT)
- ZIP code: 46034
- Area code: 317
- FIPS code: 18-12628
- GNIS feature ID: 2396646
- Website: www.ciceroin.org

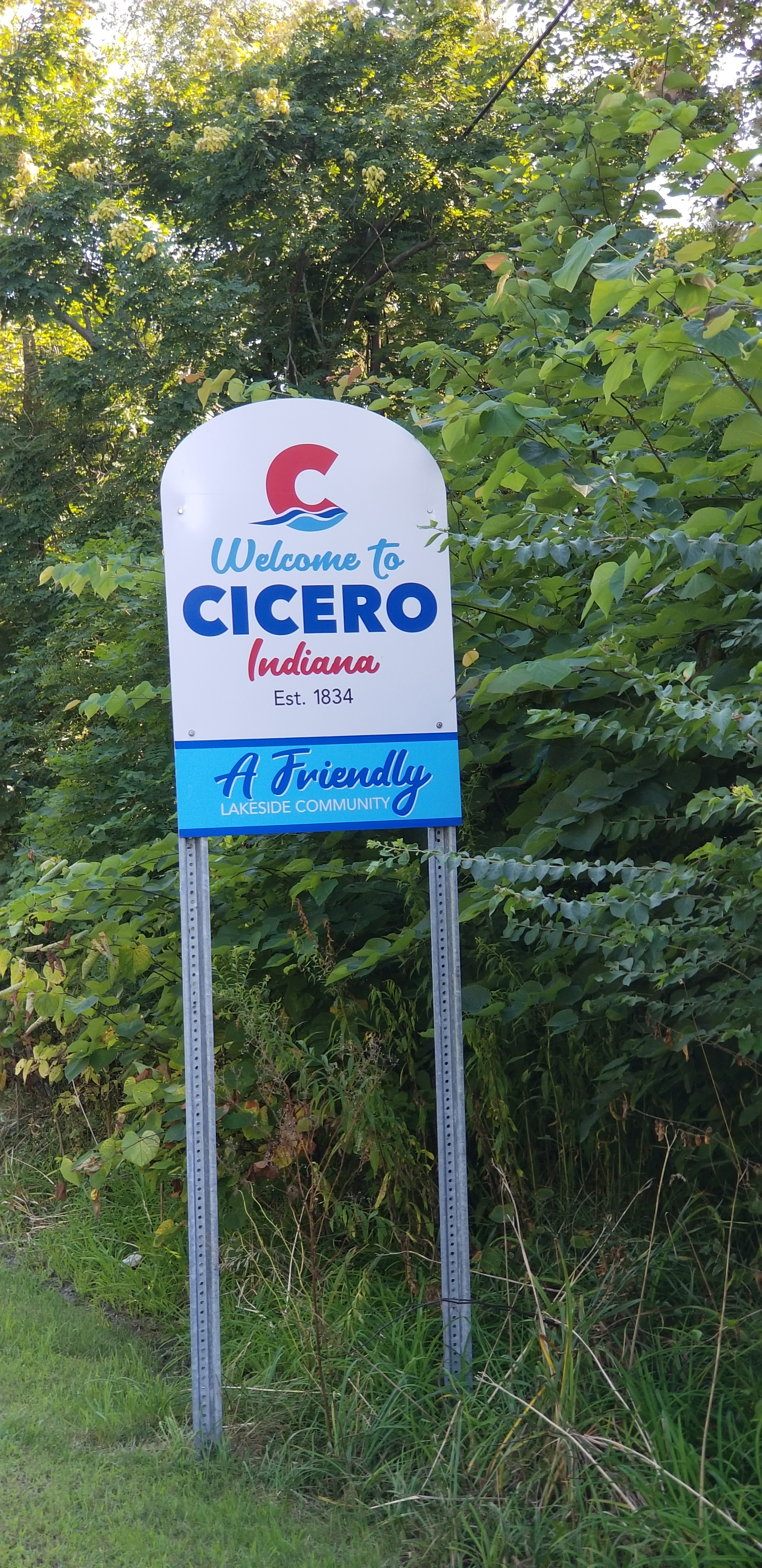
Sign welcoming visitors to Cicero Indiana

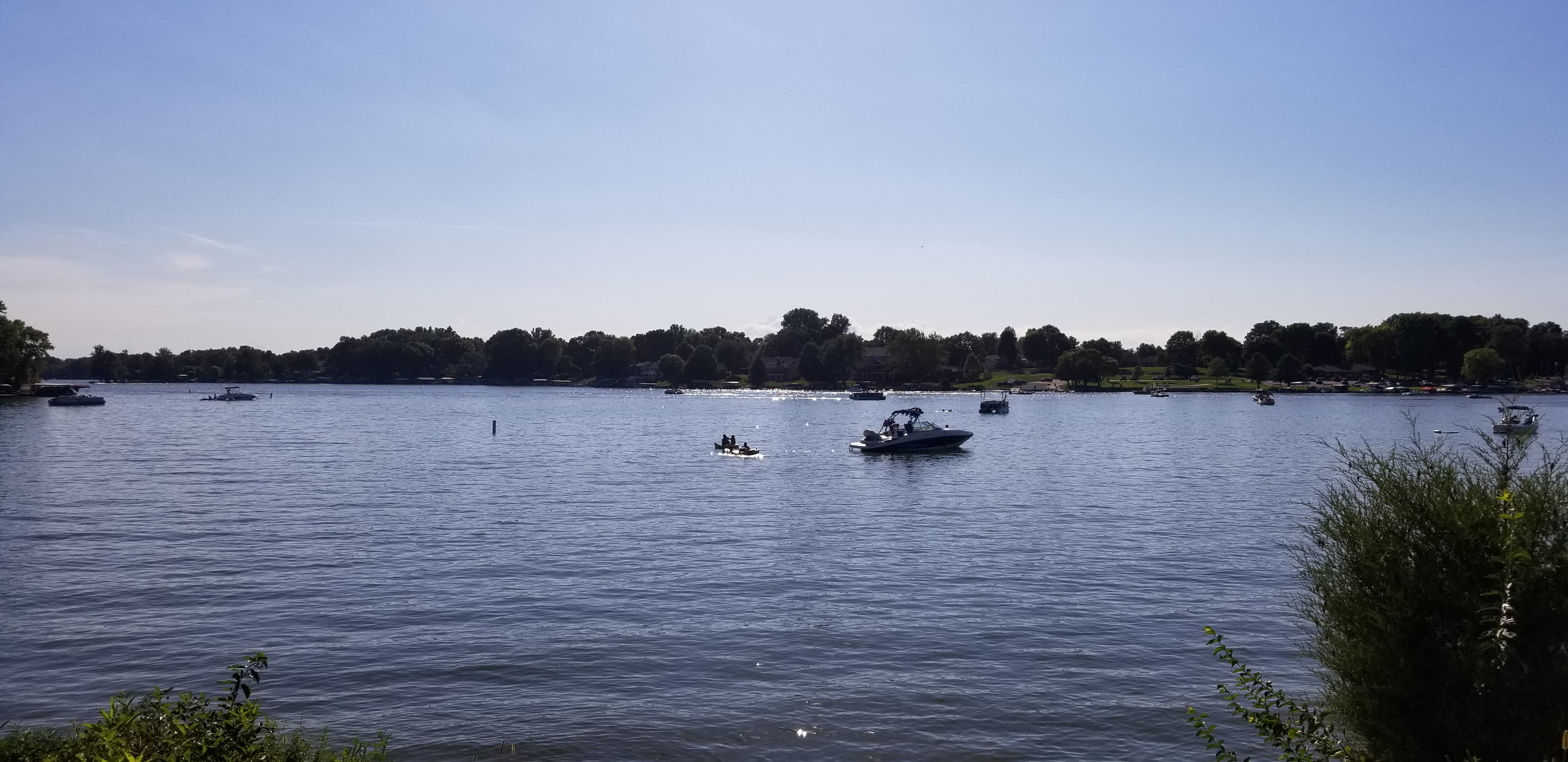
Morse reservoir near Cicero

Cicero is a town in Jackson Township, Hamilton County, Indiana, United States, north of Indianapolis. The population was 5,301 at the 2020 census.

Cicero is notable for welcoming teenaged AIDS activist Ryan White to its community in 1987. White is buried in Cicero.

== History ==
Cicero was founded in 1834. The town took its name from Cicero Creek. The first post office in Jackson Township was established at Cicero in 1839.

The construction of Morse Reservoir in 1956, the northern end of which lies in Cicero, brought more development to the town as well.

== Geography ==
Cicero is located on the northeast shore of Morse Reservoir.

According to the 2020 census, Cicero has a total area of 2.041 square miles (5.29 km^{2}), of which 1.629 square miles (4.22 km^{2}) is land and 0.412 square miles (1.07 km^{2}) is water.

== Demographics ==
Historical population
Census	Pop.	Note	%±
1860	278		—
1870	422		51.8%
1880	715		69.4%
1890	631		−11.7%
1900	1,603		154.0%
1910	990		−38.2%
1920	906		−8.5%
1930	933		3.0%
1940	943		1.1%
1950	1,021		8.3%
1960	1,284		25.8%
1970	1,378		7.3%
1980	2,557		85.6%
1990	3,268		27.8%
2000	4,303		31.7%
2010	4,812		11.8%
2020	5,301		10.2%
2025 (est.)	5,581		5.3%
U.S. Decennial Census

Cicero is largely a lakeside community.

=== 2020 census ===
As of the 2020 census, Cicero had a population of 5,301. The median age was 42.4 years. 22.5% of residents were under the age of 18 and 18.3% of residents were 65 years of age or older. For every 100 females there were 97.8 males, and for every 100 females age 18 and over there were 95.3 males age 18 and over.

100.0% of residents lived in urban areas, while 0.0% lived in rural areas.

There were 2,200 households in Cicero, of which 29.1% had children under the age of 18 living in them. Of all households, 55.3% were married-couple households, 16.1% were households with a male householder and no spouse or partner present, and 21.4% were households with a female householder and no spouse or partner present. About 24.9% of all households were made up of individuals and 10.3% had someone living alone who was 65 years of age or older.

There were 2,343 housing units, of which 6.1% were vacant. The homeowner vacancy rate was 0.7% and the rental vacancy rate was 5.6%.

Racial composition as of the 2020 census
Race	Number	Percent
White	4,992	94.2%
Black or African American	32	0.6%
American Indian and Alaska Native	13	0.2%
Asian	12	0.2%
Native Hawaiian and Other Pacific Islander	0	0.0%
Some other race	42	0.8%
Two or more races	210	4.0%
Hispanic or Latino (of any race)	101	1.9%

=== 2010 census ===
As of the census of 2010, there were 4,812 people, 1,952 households, and 1,381 families living in the town. The population density was 2,814.0 inhabitants per square mile (1,086.5/km^{2}). There were 2,167 housing units at an average density of 1,267.3 per square mile (489.3/km^{2}). The racial makeup of the town was 96.8% White, 0.6% African American, 0.6% Native American, 0.5% Asian, 0.4% from other races, and 1.1% from two or more races. Hispanic or Latino of any race were 1.5% of the population.

There were 1,952 households, of which 34.8% had children under the age of 18 living with them, 53.6% were married couples living together, 11.3% had a female householder with no husband present, 5.8% had a male householder with no wife present, and 29.3% were non-families. 24.5% of all households were made up of individuals, and 8.2% had someone living alone who was 65 years of age or older. The average household size was 2.47 and the average family size was 2.89.

The median age in the town was 39.8 years. 25.2% of residents were under the age of 18; 6.6% were between the ages of 18 and 24; 25.6% were from 25 to 44; 31% were from 45 to 64; and 11.6% were 65 years of age or older. The gender makeup of the town was 49.2% male and 50.8% female.

=== 2000 census ===
As of the census of 2000, there were 4,303 people, 1,716 households, and 1,257 families living in the town. The population density was 2,877.8 inhabitants per square mile (1,111.1/km^{2}). There were 1,811 housing units at an average density of 1,211.2 per square mile (467.6/km^{2}). The racial makeup of the town was 97.89% White, 0.19% African American, 0.30% Native American, 0.28% Asian, 0.02% Pacific Islander, 0.63% from other races, and 0.70% from two or more races. Hispanic or Latino of any race were 1.12% of the population.

There were 1,716 households, out of which 36.0% had children living with them, 59.2% were married couples living together, 10.0% had a female householder with no husband present, and 26.7% were non-families. 21.4% of all households were made up of individuals, and 6.5% had someone living alone who was 65 years of age or older. The average household size was 2.51 and the average family size was 2.92.

In the town, the population was spread out, with 26.4% under the age of 18, 8.2% from 18 to 24, 32.3% from 25 to 44, 24.6% from 45 to 64, and 8.5% who were 65 years of age or older. The median age was 36 years. For every 100 females, there were 96.2 males. For every 100 females age 18 and over, there were 96.0 males.

The median income for a household in the town was $54,561, and the median income for a family was $60,559. Males had a median income of $39,131 versus $29,574 for females. The per capita income for the town was $23,169. About 0.7% of families and 1.7% of the population were below the poverty line, including none of those under age 18 and 2.8% of those age 65 or over.

== Education ==
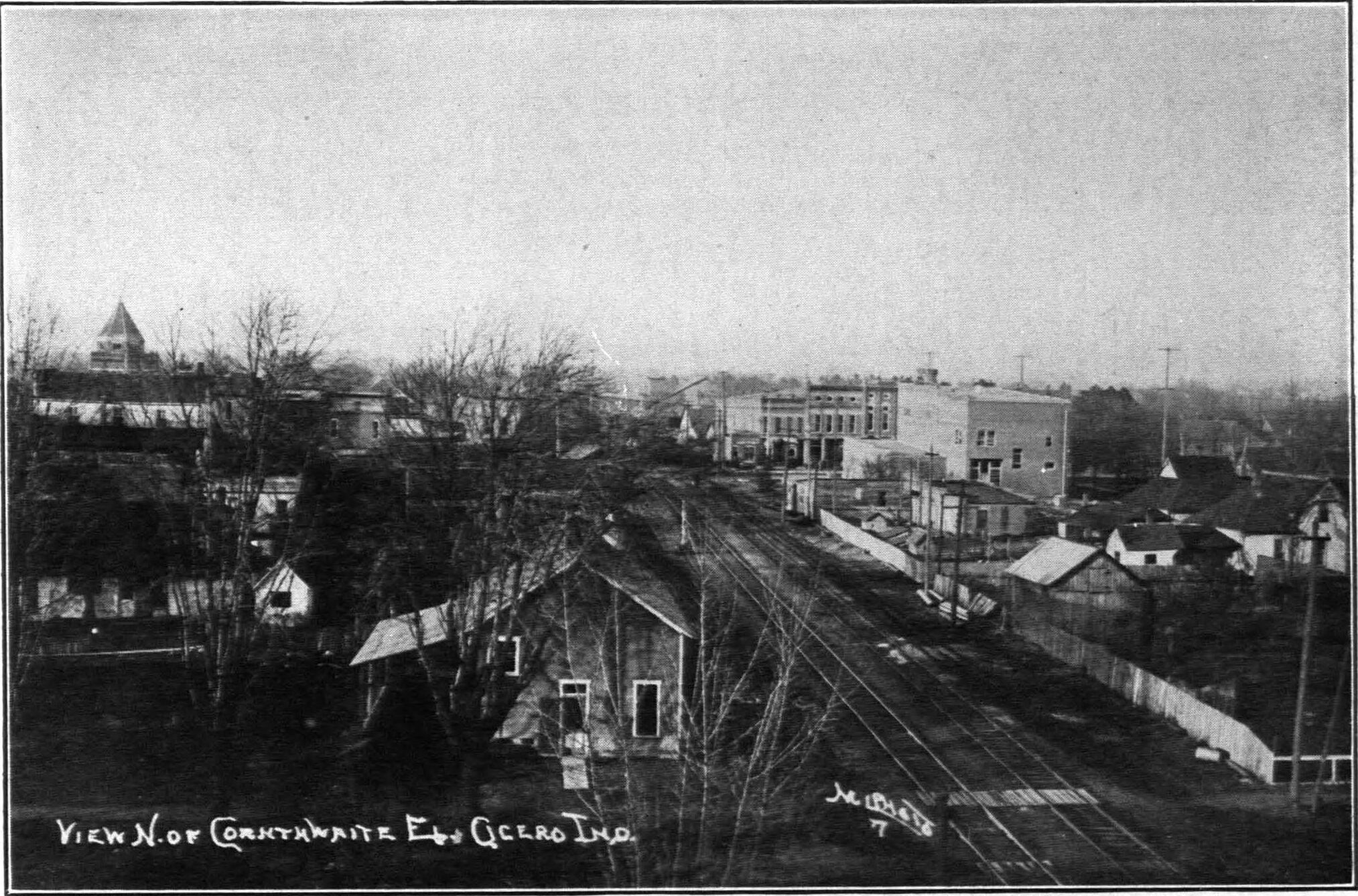
Cicero, Hamilton County, Indiana 1915

Cicero is served by Hamilton Heights School Corporation, Indiana Academy and Cicero Seventh-day Adventist Elementary School.

The town has a lending library, the Hamilton North Public Library.

== Notable people ==
- Frank C. McConnell, US Army major general, born in Cicero

== In popular culture ==
The plot of the episode entitled "The Kids Are All Right" from the TV series Supernatural took place in the town of Cicero, Indiana.

The town was represented in the 1989 biopic The Ryan White Story as the town to which Ryan White moved in order to escape prejudice in Kokomo, Indiana. However, it is only featured in the last two scenes of the movie.
