= Harvard Dictionary of Music =

American non-fiction book

First edition

The Harvard Dictionary of Music is a standard music reference book published by the Belknap Press of Harvard University Press.

The first edition, titled Harvard Dictionary of Music, was published in 1944, and was edited by Willi Apel. The second edition, also edited by Apel, was published in 1969. A new editor, Don Michael Randel, took over for the third edition in 1986. The book was retitled The New Harvard Dictionary of Music, and featured expanded coverage of twentieth-century and non-Western music, and including information on jazz and popular music for the first time. For the fourth edition (2003, also edited by Randel), the book reverted to the earlier title (with the article added), The Harvard Dictionary of Music.

Unlike some other standard music reference books, The Harvard Dictionary of Music includes no biographical entries. Biographical information may be found in a companion volume, The Harvard Biographical Dictionary of Music, published in 1996, which contains approximately 5500 entries.
