= Bakers Corner, Indiana =

- Unincorporated community
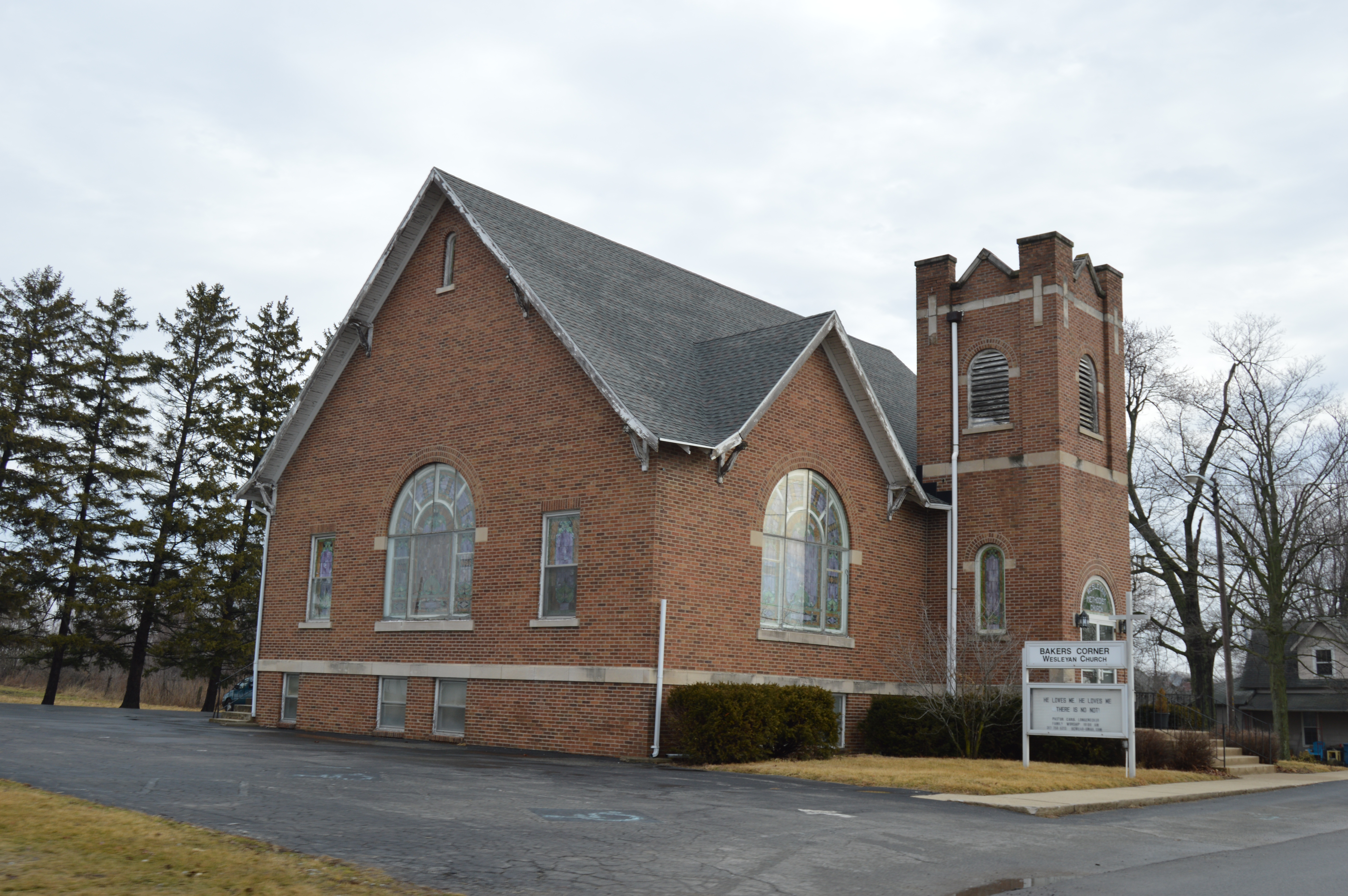
- Wesleyan church

- Location within Indiana Location within the United States
- Coordinates: 40°07′50″N 86°08′15″W
- Country: United States
- State: Indiana
- County: Hamilton
- Township: Adams
- Elevation: 915 ft (279 m)
- ZIP code: 46069
- Area codes: 317/463
- FIPS code: 18-03196
- GNIS feature ID: 430439

Bakers Corner is an unincorporated community in Adams Township, Hamilton County, Indiana.

== History ==
A post office was established at Bakers Corner in 1873, and remained in operation until it was discontinued in 1900. Members of the Baker family served as early postmasters.
