= Cicero Creek (Indiana) =

Stream in Indiana

Coordinates: 40°01′27″N 86°01′25″W

Cicero Creek is a stream in the U.S. state of Indiana. It is a tributary to the White River.

Cicero Creek was named after Cicero McLaughlin, the son of a surveyor.

The creek has a mean annual discharge of 193 cubic feet per second at Noblesville, Indiana.
