= AIS =

AIS may refer to:

== Medicine ==
- Abbreviated Injury Scale, an anatomical-based coding system to classify and describe the severity of injuries
- Acute ischemic stroke, the thromboembolic type of stroke
- Androgen insensitivity syndrome, an intersex condition in which there is an inability of many cells in the affected genetic male to respond to androgenic hormones
- Athens Insomnia Scale, used to measure severity of insomnia

== Organizations and companies ==
- Advanced Info Service, Thai mobile phone operator
- Akademio Internacia de la Sciencoj San Marino (International Academy of Sciences San Marino), a scientific association
- AIS Airlines, Dutch airline
- Armée islamique du salut, military wing of the Islamic Salvation Front, a former political party in Algeria
- Asahi India Glass Limited, Indian manufacturing company
- Association for Information Systems, an international professional organization
- Australian Information Service, historical Australian government agency (1973–1986)
- Australian Institute of Sport, a division of the Australian Sports Commission
- Australian Iron & Steel
- Aviatsionnaya Ispitatelnaya Stantsiya, Russian World War I naval aviation station and aircraft company

== Schools ==
- Abu Dhabi International School in Abu Dhabi, United Arab Emirates
- Agnes Irwin School in Pennsylvania, U.S.
- Ahmadhiyya International School in Malé, Maldives
- Almaty International School in Almaty, Kazakhstan
- American International School (disambiguation), several schools, some known as AIS
- Antonine International School, in Ajaltoun, Lebanon
- Antwerp International School, in Antwerp, Belgium
- Atlanta International School, in Georgia, U.S.
- Australian International School (disambiguation), several schools, some known as AIS

== Software and technology ==
- Accounting information system, a system of collecting, storing and processing financial and accounting data
- Aeronautical Information Service, distributor of air navigation information
- Automatic identification system, for tracking marine vessels
- Alarm indication signal in a telecommunications system
  - Alarm indication signal line (AIS-L)
  - Alarm indication signal path (AIS-P)
- Alternate Instruction Set, a second processor mode in Centaur/VIA C3 x86 CPUs
- Application Interface Specification, for high-availability application software
- Artificial immune system, in artificial intelligence
- AI safety, a field concerned with preventing harmful consequences that could result from artificial intelligence
- Artificial Intelligence System, a distributed computing project undertaken by Intelligence Realm, Inc.
- Automotive Industry Standards, vehicle technical specifications of India
- Automated information system, an assembly of computer hardware, software, firmware, or any combination of these, configured to accomplish specific information-handling operations

== Others ==
- Arorae Island Airport, Kiribati (IATA code "AIS")
- Ais (mythology), Etruscan word meaning 'god'
- Ais people, a Native American tribe living on the Atlantic coast of Florida, U.S.
- Ais, an alternate spelling of Eyeish, a native American tribe in Texas, U.S.
- American Indycar Series (1988–2005), a former American auto racing series
