= Ulen =

Ulen may refer to:

== People ==
- Thomas Ulen, an American law and economics professor

== Places ==
=== Norway ===
- Ulen (lake), a lake in the municipality of Lierne in Trøndelag county

=== United States ===
- Ulen, Indiana, a town in Center Township, Boone County, Indiana
  - Ulen Historic District, a national historic district located at Ulen, Boone County, Indiana
- Ulen, Minnesota, a small city in Clay County, Minnesota
- Ulen Township, Clay County, Minnesota, a township in Clay County, Minnesota

== Other ==
- Upuh Ulen-Ulen, a traditional cloth of the Gayonese people in Aceh (Indonesia).
- Ulen sword

== See also ==
- Ulens
- Uelen
