= Ulens =

Ulens may refer to:

== People ==
- Arthur Ulens (born 1946), Belgian businessman
- Baptiste Ulens (born 1987), Belgian football player
- Guillaume Ulens (1909–1970), Belgian footballer

== Other uses ==
- Ulens kvintett, Norwegian music group

== See also ==
- Ulen
