= AGC Glass Europe =

Glass manufacturer in Belgium

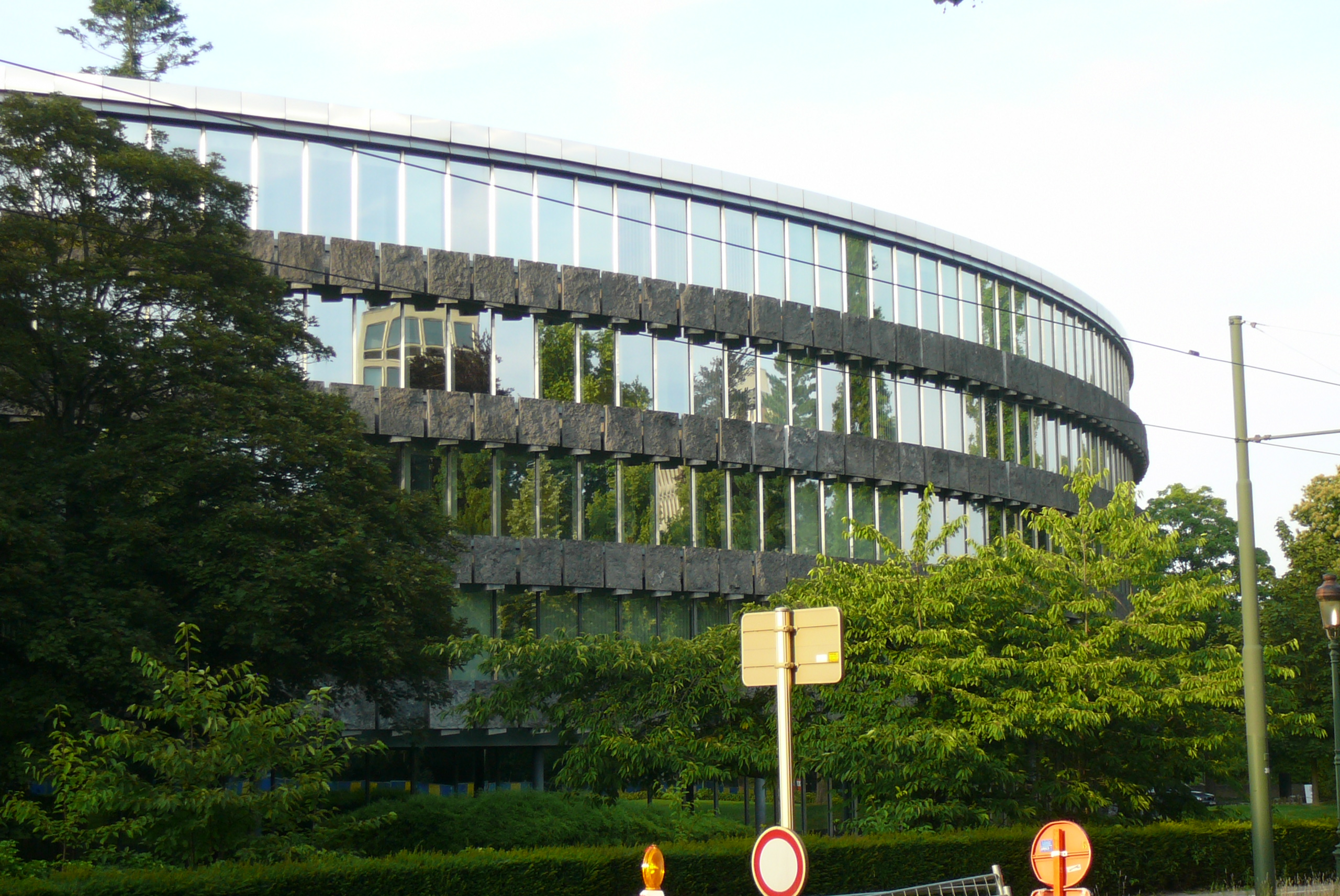
AGC Glass Office Portrait

AGC Glass Europe is an international glass manufacturing group based in Louvain-la-Neuve, Belgium, and the European branch of the AGC Inc. Group.

AGC Glass Europe currently employs some 14,500 people. Its industrial facilities comprise 18 float glass lines, 10 automotive glass processing centres and more than 100 distribution-processing units in Europe, stretching from Spain to Russia.

== History ==
Glaverbel was founded in 1961 in Belgium out of the merger of Glaver S.A. (Glaces et Verres) and Univerbel S.A. (Union des Verreries Mécaniques Belges). In 1972, the French BSN (Boussois-Souchon-Neuvesel) group (now Danone) gained control over Glaverbel. Glaverbel started with a restructuring program and diversified into glass processing in 1974.

In 1981, BSN shed its flat glass activities and the Asahi Glass Co. Ltd. of Japan acquired Glaverbel. In 1987, Glaverbel was registered at the Brussels stock exchange and in 1991, expanded into Central Europe with the acquisition of Glavunion in Czechoslovakia. Glaverbel was the first western industrial company to invest in Czechoslovakia, and in 1997, the first western glass producer to invest in Russia. In 1998, Glaverbel acquired the European glass activities of PPG Glass Industries, mainly located in France and Italy.

In 2002, AGC acquired the whole of Glaverbel, and was deregistered from the Brussels stock exchange. In 2007, Glaverbel was renamed as AGC Flat Glass Europe and in 2010, AGC Glass Europe.

Jean-François Heris is AGC Glass Europe President and CEO to date. AGC Glass Europe employs around 14,500 people.

Splintex was being a brand of automotive glasses which was being owned by Glaverbel Group until 2007.

In 2015, AGC acquired Polish automotive glass manufacturer NordGlass.

== Price-fixing scandal ==
AGC Flat Glass Europe (Glaverbel) is one of the four glass manufacturers who were fined a total of 486.9 million euros ($717.5 million; £348.2m) by the European Commission on 28 November 2007, for illegally co-coordinating price rises. The European Commission said the firm had raised or stabilised prices in 2004 and 2005, through illicit contacts with the other principal glass manufacturers: Guardian Industries of the US, Pilkington (the UK unit of Nippon Sheet Glass), and Saint-Gobain of France; all four of which together controlled 80% of Europe's market for flat glass.

Neelie Kroes, the EU's competition commissioner, said that the EU would "not tolerate companies cheating consumers and business customers by fixing prices and depriving them of the benefits of the single market".

== See also ==
- Luc Willame
- Arthur Ulens
- Glass production
