= Luc Willame =

Belgian businessman

Luc Willame is a Belgian businessman, who heads the worldwide flat glass operations of Asahi Glass, which is the world's leading glassmaker.

== Career ==
Luc Willame joined Glaverbel in November 1982, where he held various posts, such as administration and finance director and member of the executive committee. In September 1989 he was appointed CEO and chairman of the executive committee of Glaverbel. Since 2002 Luc Willame heads the worldwide flat glass operations of Asahi Glass. In addition he has also been appointed Senior Executive Vice President of the Asahi Glass group. He is a member of the Belgian businessclub Cercle de Lorraine. During his studies he was a member of the Olivaint Conference of Belgium.

== Sources ==
- Asahi Glass decided to make a public tender offer for shares in Glaverbel S.A. (2001)
- The Flat Glass Company (Asahi Glass): two major investments in Mexico and Russia (2002)
