= Arthur Ulens =

Belgian businessman

- Born: Leuven, Belgium

Arthur Ulens (born 1946) is a Belgian businessman and former head of AGC Flat Glass which groups the worldwide flat glass activities of the Asahi Glass Company (AGC).

== Education ==
He graduated in chemistry and economy at the Catholic University of Leuven.

== Career ==
Ulens started his career at Glaverbel at the new products division in 1969. He continued his career in marketing, sales, export of special glass and later on all flat glass for the building industry. In 1981, Glaverbel was acquired by the Asahi Glass Company (AGC) of Japan. In 1989, he was appointed Director of Glaverbel Canada. Ulens returned to Europe in 1995, joined the board of directors of the Glaverbel Group and managed the Architectural Glass unit. In 1998, he was appointed director of the Building division and in 2002, he became CEO and President of the board of directors of the Glaverbel Group. In 2005, he was appointed head of AGC Flat Glass. He retired on 1 April 2008.

== Sources ==
- Arthur Ulens
- Luc Willame to head the worldwide flat glass activities of Asahi Glass
