= W. H. Diddle =

Bill Diddel (1882–February 25, 1985) was an American amateur golfer and renowned golf course designer. He was born in Indianapolis, Indiana.

Diddel designed approximately three hundred golf courses, primarily in the Midwest, beginning with Ulen Country Club in Lebanon, Indiana. Diddel designed the golf course at Northwood Club in Dallas, Texas, which was the site of the U.S. Open in 1952.

Diddel was one of the founders and a charter member of the American Society of Golf Course Architects. He was elected president of that body in 1954.

Diddel was the recipient of numerous awards and recognitions, including:

- The Fred Waring Sportsmanship Award
- The American Seniors Golf Association Hall of Honor
- Indiana Golf Hall of Fame
- Sagamore of the Wabash
- Honorary Sergeant of Arms of the Tennessee State Senate

Diddel died February 25, 1985, in Zionsville, Indiana.
