= Asahi India Glass =

Indian manufacturing company

Asahi India Glass Limited
- Type: Public
- Traded as: BSE: ASAHIINDIA; NSE: ASAHIINDIA; S&P BSE 500 Component
- Industry: Auto parts and equipment
- Headquarters: New Delhi, India
- Key people: Mr. Sanjay Labroo - (Managing Director & C.E.O) & Mr. B.M Labroo (chairman)
- Products: Architectural glass, Automotive glass, Consumer glass
- Total assets: ₹2376.36 Crore (18 March)
- Number of employees: 1042
- Website: www.aisglass.com

Asahi India Glass Limited, known as AIS, is a glass solutions and manufacturing company in India. It was established in 1984. It manufactures automotive safety glass, float glass, architectural processed glass, and glass products. It also provides consumer glass offerings in the form of Glasxperts and Windshield Experts. AIS was established as a Joint Venture agreement between Mr. BM Labroo and family, Asahi Glass Co. Ltd. (AGC Inc.), Japan, and Maruti Suzuki. In the Indian passenger car glass segment, AIS has 77.1% market share as of 2017. AIS also holds 20% market share in India’s architectural glass segment as of 2017.

== History ==
=== 1984-2000 ===
In 1984, AIS was initially incorporated in India under the name Indian Auto Safety Glass Private Limited. By 1986, the company transferred its equity stake to Asahi Glass Co., Japan. During this period, a joint venture agreement was carried out among the promoters, namely Asahi Glass Co., Japan, Indo-Asahi Glass Company and Maruti Udyog. The company was thus incorporated as public limited company under the name of Asahi India Safety Glass Limited on 31 December 1985. Initially, the company only manufactured toughened glass for Maruti Suzuki India Limited. However, in 1989, after increasing its tempered glass production capacity by installing a new furnace, the company began manufacturing toughened glass for other automobile manufacturers. The company also introduced black ceramic printing and heat-li By 1992, the company ventured into manufacturing of laminated safety windshields. Four years later, anticipating an increase in demand of laminated windshields due to them being made mandatory for passenger vehicles under revised Central Motor Vehicle Rules, AIS carried out a major capacity expansion to produce 7,50,000 laminated windshields. By 1999, the company added Hyundai, Ford, Toyota, and Hindustan Motors to its clientele while also increasing its tempered

=== 2000-present ===
With the turn of the millennium, AIS increased its technology capabilities with a slew of installations including laminated bending furnace for producing complex laminated windshields, CAD station and in-house designing, and print marking on glass for brand visibility. In 2001, Float Glass India, a subsidiary of Asahi Glass Co., Japan, became the subsidiary of AIS. Next year, AIS made its first acquisition by acquiring 79.6% stake in Float Glass India and absorbing it under its own brand name. In 2002, the company also rebranded itself as Asahi India Glass Limited (AIS) and in 2003, it set up a new automotive glass manufacturing plant in Chennai. This was followed by commencement of commercial production at the company’s Architectural Processing Unit in Taloja in 2004. In 2005, AIS Glass Solutions Ltd. was set up to further expand in the architectural glass value chain. The year 2006 saw establishment of two more architectural processing facilities in Rewari and Chennai along with further capacity expansion across existing plants. In late 2017, AIS inaugurated a new, modernised Taloja float glass plant to enhance supply to auto and architectural glass segments by manufacturing 550 tonnes of glass per day.

== Company structure and operations ==
=== Offices ===
Asahi India Glass Ltd’s registered office is situated in New Delhi. Their corporate office is located in Gurgaon, Haryana. They have zonal offices in Delhi, Mumbai, Kolkata and Chennai and one regional office in Pune.

=== Manufacturing plants ===
AIS has 13 manufacturing plants and sub-assembly units across India. In May 2017, AIS announced its plan to invest in a Greenfield Automotive Glass Plant near Mehsana, Gujarat, in order to primarily supply the new Maruti Suzuki India Limited plant in Gujarat. In November 2017, AIS commenced float glass manufacturing at its new Taloja plant at MIDC Industrial Area, Raigad District, Maharashtra.

=== Strategic business units ===
AIS has three strategic business units. These are Automotive Glass, Architectural Glass and Consumer Glass.

==== Automotive glass ====
AIS Auto Glass is the automotive glass SBU of AIS. It provides glass to automobile manufacturers including Maruti Udyog, Tata Motors, Hyundai Motors, Mahindra & Mahindra, General Motors Ford India, Fiat India, Honda, Eicher, Volvo, Hindustan Motors, Skoda Auto, Volkswagen India, Toyota Kirloskar, and Piaggio. AIS Auto Glass has four production facilities at Bawal (Haryana), Roorkee (Uttarakhand), Chennai (Tamil Nadu), and Taloja (Maharashtra). They also have five automotive glass manufacturing plants in India.

== Acquisitions and sales ==
In 2001, AIS acquired a stake in Asahi Glass Co., Japan’s subsidiary Float Glass India. In 2003, the amalgamation of the two companies was approved with 79.6% equity in FGI held by AIS. In 2017, AIS and four other investors concluded a deal to acquire Timex Group Precision Engineering Limited which is the Indian subsidiary of Timex Nederland BV. This acquisition was carried out via a joint venture firm Scopfy Components Pvt Ltd.

== Awards ==
In 2007, AIS was rated as the ‘Best Indian Company in Glass and Ceramics’ by Dun & Bradstreet. In the same year, the Union of Japanese Scientists and Engineers (JUSE) awarded AIS Auto Glass with the Deming Application Prize 2007.
