= NordGlass =

Polish glass company

- Native name: NordGlass
- Formerly: JAAN
- Industry: Glass; Ceramics
- Founded: June 1, 1991; 35 years ago, in Koszalin, Poland
- Headquarters: ul. Bohaterów Warszawy 11; 75-211 Koszalin; Poland
- Key people: Adam Wachowicz (CEO and president)
- Products: Glass products; Ceramic products; Chemicals
- Number of employees: over 1,000 (2020)
- Website: Official website

NordGlass, is a Polish manufacturer of windshields for the repair of passenger cars and trucks, work machinery, railways, ships and military (armored glass). Headquartered in Koszalin, it has 2 plants: Koszalin and Słupsk, employs over 1,000 employees, has a nationwide network of repair and replacement of car windows. Since 2015, it is a subsidiary of AGC Inc. – the largest glass company in the world and one of the core Mitsubishi companies.

== Overview ==
One of the largest Polish manufacturers of windshields for the repair of passenger cars and trucks, working machines, railways, ships, construction and military (armored glass), NordGlass was acquired by AGC in 2015. 2 plants, in Koszalin and in Słupsk, with annual production exceeding one million panes, NordGlass employs over 1000 employees. NordGlass has a nationwide network of repair and replacement of car windows. The recipients of the main NordGlass product – windshields for motor vehicles, are the companies dealing with professional car glass replacement are all over Europe, as well as in South America (Brazil) and North Africa. Among them, a prominent position is held by Belron, the Belgian operator of Europe's largest international glass replacement network. NordGlass is one of the main windscreen suppliers for this customer.

In 2014, NordGlass manufactured the set of bulletproof windows for Cadillac 355D Fleetwood Special made in 1934, in the USA on the special order for Marshal Józef Piłsudski. The completion of the vehicle glazing constituted the essential part of the thorough vehicle renovation project. The original windows showed traces of bullets, most probably fired in the post-war period by the Communist Security Service officers who were testing the resistance of glass. It is currently possible to see the renovated vehicle in the Royal Baths Park (Polish: Łazienki Królewskie) in Warsaw. In 2015, the company was acquired by the Japanese concern AGC Inc. In 2017, the IRIS quality management system for the railway industry was implemented, subsequently recertified according to ISO/TS 22163:2017. In 2019, there was an expansion of the production plant in Koszalin.

== Products ==
Its main areas of production are:

- Automotive glass – windshields for repairs
