= Aviatsionnaya Ispitatelnaya Stantsiya =

Naval air test station in Russia

Aviatsionnaya Ispitatelnaya Stantsiya (AIS) was a naval air test station in Russia during World War I notable for designing and producing several aircraft designs. The facility was founded at the Petrograd Polytechnic Institute near the end of 1916 with a seaplane base on Krestovsky Island.

== Aircraft ==
Two aircraft designs were created by AIS. The first, produced by engineer P. A. Shishkov, was a Farman pusher-biplane type modified to carry a torpedo, powered by a 130 hp Clerget engine. First flight was achieved in August 1917, and several flights of more than 1 hour were completed. A second design, named Aist, was built in the fall of 1917, as a two-seat seaplane powered by a 150 hp Sunbeam engine. The Aist was armed with two machine guns, one fixed and one on a flexible mount.

Summary of aircraft built by Aviatsionnaya Ispitatelnaya Stantsiya
Model name	First flight	Number built	Type
AIS torpedo carrier	August 1917	1	Torpedo bomber
AIS Aist	1917	1	Maritime patrol seaplane

== See also ==
- List of aircraft (A)
