= Ulens kvintett =

Ulens kvintett was a Norwegian gammaldansgroup, who came from Sel Municipality and Folldal Municipality. The band takes its name from the leader's surname, Ulen.

== Crew ==
The following lists the band members over the course of its history.

- Øystein Ulen - accordion
- Kjell Grothe - accordion
- Jan Moen - accordion
- Arild Plassen - violin
- Magne Bø - violin
- Olav Juvshoel - violin
- Even Svelstad - violin
- Jan Haugstulen - guitar
- Øyvind Grindstuen - bass guitar/contrabass

== Discography ==
- Elvesøg (1987)
- Lugume leikje (1988)
- Selsbrure (1991)
- Gjensynsglede (2002)

== Achievements ==
- 1986 Gold at "Landsfestivalen i Gamaldansmusikk", Førde
- 1987 Gold at "Landsfestivalen i Gamaldansmusikk", Heimdal
- 1988 Gold at "Landsfestivalen i Gamaldansmusikk", Vinstra
- 1991 Silver at "Landsfestivalen i Gamaldansmusikk", Vågå
- 1992 Gold at "Landsfestivalen i Gamaldansmusikk", Geilo
