= Athens Insomnia Scale =

Diagnostic tool

- Purpose: measure insomnia

In medicine, insomnia is measured using the Athens Insomnia Scale. It was introduced in the year 2000 by a group of researchers from Athens, Greece to assess the insomnia symptoms in patients with sleep disorders.

It is measured by assessing eight factors, five related to nocturnal sleep and three related to daytime dysfunction. These are rated on a 0–3 scale and tabulated into a cumulative score. A score of 6 or higher is used to establish the diagnosis of insomnia.

The Athens Insomnia Scale is considered to be an effective tool in sleep analysis, and it is validated in various countries by testing it on local patients.

Sleep factors	Athens insomnia scale			
Sleep induction	0: No problem	1: Slightly delayed	2: Markedly delayed	3: Very delayed or did not sleep at all
Awakenings during the night	0: No problem	1: Minor problem	2: Considerable problem	3: Serious problem or did not sleep at all
Final awakening	0: Not earlier	1: A little earlier	2: Markedly earlier	3: Much earlier or did not sleep at all
Total sleep duration	0: Sufficient	1: Slightly insufficient	2: Markedly insufficient	3: Very insufficient or did not sleep at all
Sleep quality	0: Satisfactory	1: Slightly unsatisfactory	2: Markedly unsatisfactory	3: Very unsatisfactory or did not sleep at all
Well-being during the day	0: Normal	1: Slightly decreased	2: Markedly decreased	3: Very decreased
Functioning capacity during the day	0: Normal	1: Slightly decreased	2: Markedly decreased	3: Very decreased
Sleepiness during the day	0: None	1: Mild	2: Considerable	3: Intense
