= Australian International School =

Australian International School may refer to:

- Australian International School Beijing
- Australian International School Hong Kong
- Australian Independent School, Indonesia, formerly Australian International School, Indonesia. Name change was a government requirement.
- Australian International School, Malaysia
- Australian International School Singapore
- Australian International School Vietnam
