= Abu Dhabi International School =

Abu Dhabi International School (AIS)

Location
- Abu Dhabi; United Arab Emirates
- Coordinates: 24.4622°N 54.3656°E (AUH) 24.3463°N 54.5415°E (MBZ)

Information
- Type: Private international school
- Motto: "To support all students in attaining their full potential in personal development and active citizenship by providing the foundation for lifelong learning through quality education"
- Established: 1992; 34 years ago
- Founder: Jihan Nasr
- Principal: Pamela Issa (AUH)
- Principal: Boghos Terzian (MBZ)
- Staff: 275
- Years offered: K-12
- Enrollment: 4,018
- School fees: AED30,800–46,400 (MBZ); AED15,160–32,280 (AUH)
- Alumni: Ali Lari; Firas Elayan; Meelo-Beelo; Bin Zeus
- Website: aisschools.com

Abu Dhabi International Private School (Arabic: مدرسة أبو ظبي الدولية الخاصة, romanized: Madrasaẗ Ābu Ẓabi Al-Dawliyyah Al-H̱aṣa) (usually shortened to Abu Dhabi International (Pvt.) School, Abu Dhabi International School, or just AIS) is a private international school licensed by the UAE Ministry of Education located in Abu Dhabi in the United Arab Emirates. The school offers an American curriculum, as well as the International General Certificate of Secondary Education (IGCSE) and the International Baccalaureate (IB) programs. It was founded in 1992 by current superintendent, Jihan Nasr.

== Campuses ==
The school currently has two running campuses. The first campus was opened in 1992. It is located on the main island of the emirate of Abu Dhabi on Al Karamah Street. The school facilities include a library, a football field, a prayer room, a gymnasium, four laboratories, an art room, and a music room. The campus contains 1,402 students and 95 staff members. The newer campus in the Mohammed Bin Zayed City region of Abu Dhabi was opened in 2015. It contains 2,616 students and 183 staff members. As of now, the IGCSE curriculum is being offered in the first campus, while the campus in the Mohammed Bin Zayed City offers the American and IB programs.

== Accreditation ==
Abu Dhabi International School was accredited by the Commissions on International and Trans-Regional Accreditation (CITA), and is currently accredited by the American International Accreditation Association (AIAA). The school was certified by the International Baccalaureate to offer the IB Diploma Programme to students in 11th and 12th grade in 2005. Its Mohammed Bin Zayed campus has been licensed in 2015.

== Students and staff ==
The school offers its educational services to a total of 4,018 students and jobs to a total of 275 staff members. Their students and staff members are from over 60 nationalities. The school is coeducational throughout all grade levels.

== Curriculum ==
Abu Dhabi International School provides its students with three curricula: the American curriculum, the International General Certificate of Secondary Education (IGCSE) curriculum, and the International Baccalaureate (IB) curriculum. Students in the school from kindergarten up until the 9th grade follow the American curriculum. High school students choose between the American high school diploma, IGCSE program, or the IB Diploma Programme.

== Clubs and activities ==
The schools have an extra-curricular program which provides a variety of clubs that meet the needs and interest of the students. The purpose of these clubs is to teach the students new skills and techniques and to improve on their existing skills and techniques. These clubs include the football club, basketball club, art club, photography club, and the debate & public speaking club. The school has men and women senior and junior varsity teams for football, basketball, and volleyball, and has participated in many school tournaments around the country. No swimming pool.

== Affiliations ==
The school works together with many companies and organizations for the benefit of the students. It uses the surrounding community to enrich the experiences of their students. Some of the school's affiliations are listed below:

- Model United Nations
- Shaikh Khalifa Medical City
- Terry Fox Organization
- Sheraton Hotels and Resorts
- Abu Dhabi Film Festival
- Yas Waterworld Abu Dhabi
- Abu Dhabi Golf Championship

and many more.

== ADEK inspection report ==
Both campuses were given a "Very Good" rating by the Abu Dhabi Department of Education and Knowledge which makes them both "Band A" schools.
