= Ulen Historic District =

Historic district in Indiana, United States

- U.S. National Register of Historic Places
- U.S. Historic district
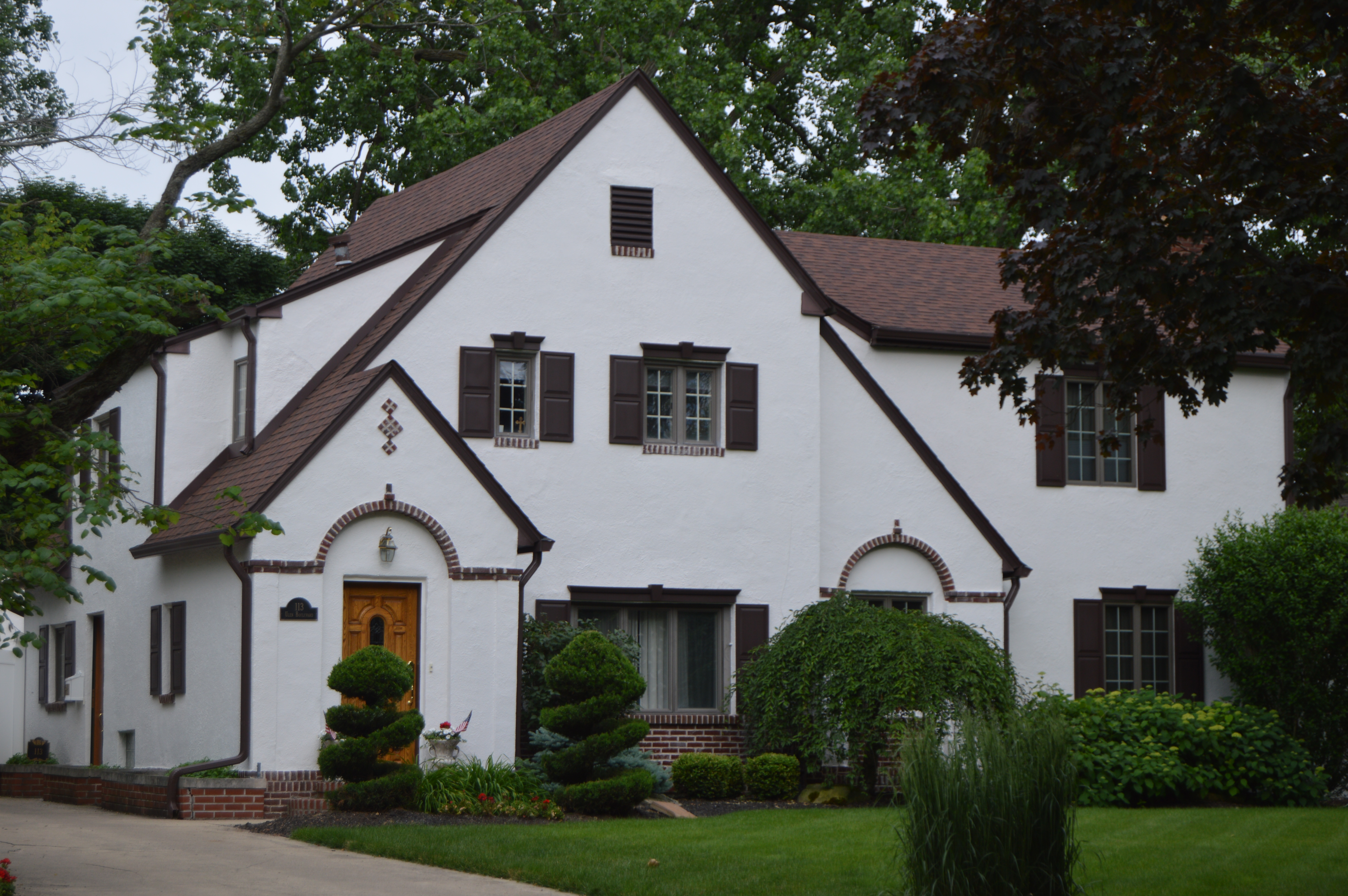
- 113 Ulen Boulevard, June 2016

- Location within Boone County, Indiana Location within Indiana Location within the United States
- Location: Roughly Ulen Country Club and Golf Course, and houses along Ulen Boulevard and East Dr., Ulen, Indiana
- Coordinates: 40°03′48″N 86°27′49″W
- Area: 146 acres (59 ha)
- Built by: Ulen, Henry C.
- Architect: Pierre & Wright; Cook, Oscar; Donaldson & Co.; Pfeiffer, R. J.; Diddel, William (Bill)
- Architectural style: Colonial Revival, Tudor Revival, Mediterranean Revival, Ranch Style
- MPS: Historic Residential Suburbs in the United States, 1830-1960 MPS
- NRHP reference No.: 15000591
- Added to NRHP: September 16, 2015

Ulen Historic District, also known as Country Club Addition, is a national historic district located at Ulen, Indiana. The district encompasses 53 contributing buildings, 2 contributing sites, 1 contributing structure, and 4 contributing objects in an upscale suburban area near Indianapolis and next to the Ulen Country Club and golf course. The golf course was the first designed by Bill Diddel. The district developed between about 1924 and 1963, and includes representative examples of Colonial Revival, Tudor Revival, Mediterranean Revival, and Ranch Style architecture.

It was listed on the National Register of Historic Places in 2015.
