= Ulen, Indiana =

- Town
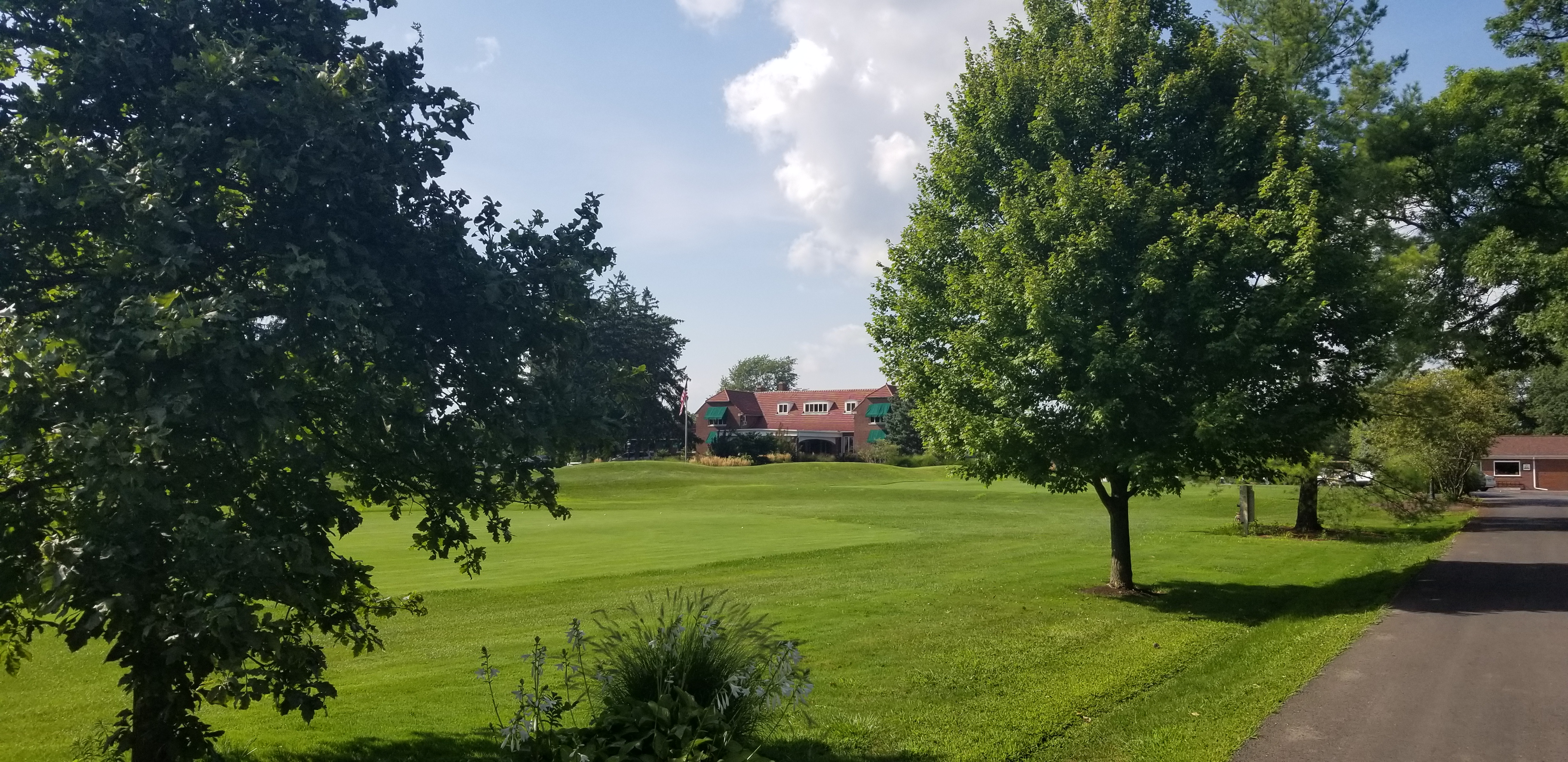
- Ulen Country Club

- Location of Ulen in Boone County, Indiana.
- Coordinates: 40°03′58″N 86°27′55″W
- Country: United States
- State: Indiana
- County: Boone
- Township: Center
- Incorporated: 1929

Area
  - Total: 0.23 sq mi (0.59 km^{2})
  - Land: 0.23 sq mi (0.59 km^{2})
  - Water: 0 sq mi (0.00 km^{2})
- Elevation: 932 ft (284 m)

Population (2020)
  - Total: 114
  - Density: 498.9/sq mi (192.64/km^{2})
- Time zone: UTC-5 (Eastern (EST))
  - Summer (DST): UTC-4 (EDT)
- ZIP code: 46052
- FIPS code: 18-77066
- GNIS feature ID: 2397703
- Website: www.ulen.town

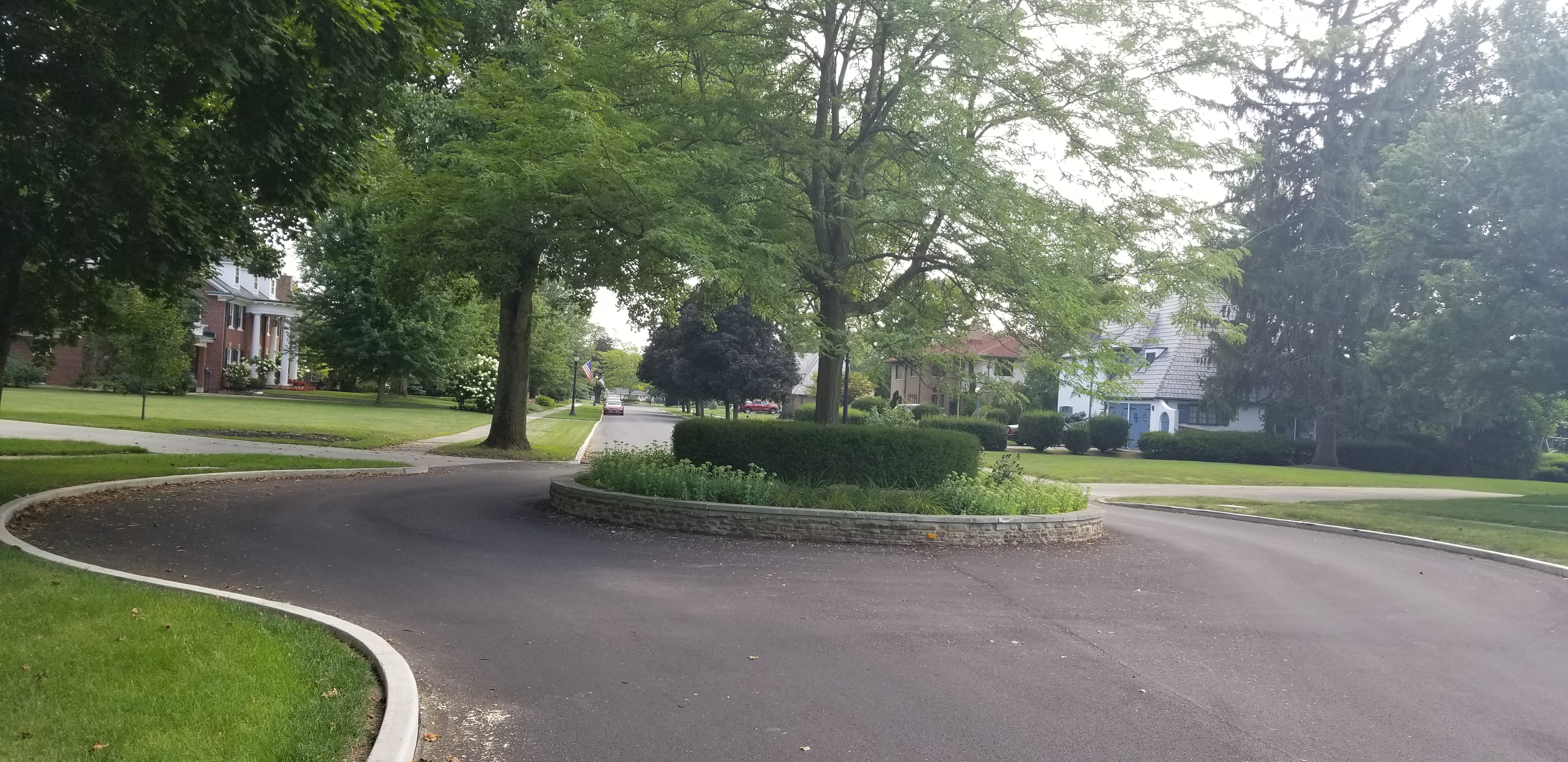
Street in Ulen, Indiana

Ulen is a town in Center Township, Boone County, in the U.S. state of Indiana. The population was 114 at the 2020 census. The town is surrounded by the city of Lebanon.

== History ==
The Ulen Country Club was established in 1924 and Ulen was incorporated as a town in 1929. It was named for Henry Ulen, an industrialist. The Ulen Historic District was listed on the National Register of Historic Places in 2015.

== Geography ==
According to the 2020 census, Ulen has a total area of 0.23 square miles (0.60 km^{2}), all land.

== Demographics ==
Historical population
Census	Pop.	Note	%±
1930	74		—
1940	99		33.8%
1950	83		−16.2%
1960	130		56.6%
1970	138		6.2%
1980	193		39.9%
1990	50		−74.1%
2000	123		146.0%
2010	117		−4.9%
2020	114		−2.6%
U.S. Decennial Census

=== 2010 census ===
At the 2010 census there were 117 people, 49 households, and 40 families living in the town. The population density was 1,950.0 inhabitants per square mile (752.9/km^{2}). There were 54 housing units at an average density of 900.0 per square mile (347.5/km^{2}). The racial makup of the town was 100.0% White. Hispanic or Latino of any race were 0.9%.

Of the 49 households 24.5% had children under the age of 18 living with them, 75.5% were married couples living together, 6.1% had a female householder with no husband present, and 18.4% were non-families. 18.4% of households were one person and 10.2% were one person aged 65 or older. The average household size was 2.39 and the average family size was 2.70.

The median age in the town was 51.8 years. 19.7% of residents were under the age of 18; 4.3% were between the ages of 18 and 24; 11.2% were from 25 to 44; 38.5% were from 45 to 64; and 26.5% were 65 or older. The gender makeup of the town was 51.3% male and 48.7% female.

=== 2000 census ===
At the 2000 census there were 123 people, 48 households, and 39 families living in the town. The population density was 1,946.9 inhabitants per square mile (751.7/km^{2}). There were 53 housing units at an average density of 838.9 per square mile (323.9/km^{2}). The racial makup of the town was 100.00% White. Of the 48 households 25.0% had children under the age of 18 living with them, 79.2% were married couples living together, 2.1% had a female householder with no husband present, and 16.7% were non-families. 14.6% of households were one person and 6.3% were one person aged 65 or older. The average household size was 2.56 and the average family size was 2.85.

The age distribution was 22.8% under the age of 18, 5.7% from 18 to 24, 13.8% from 25 to 44, 31.7% from 45 to 64, and 26.0% 65 or older. The median age was 50 years. For every 100 females, there were 92.2 males. For every 100 females age 18 and over, there were 90.0 males.

The median household income was $57,083 and the median family income was $56,667. Males had a median income of $0 versus $51,250 for females. The per capita income for the town was $41,557. None of the population and none of the families were below the poverty line.

== Education ==
It is in the Lebanon Community School Corporation. The district's comprehensive high school is Lebanon Senior High School.

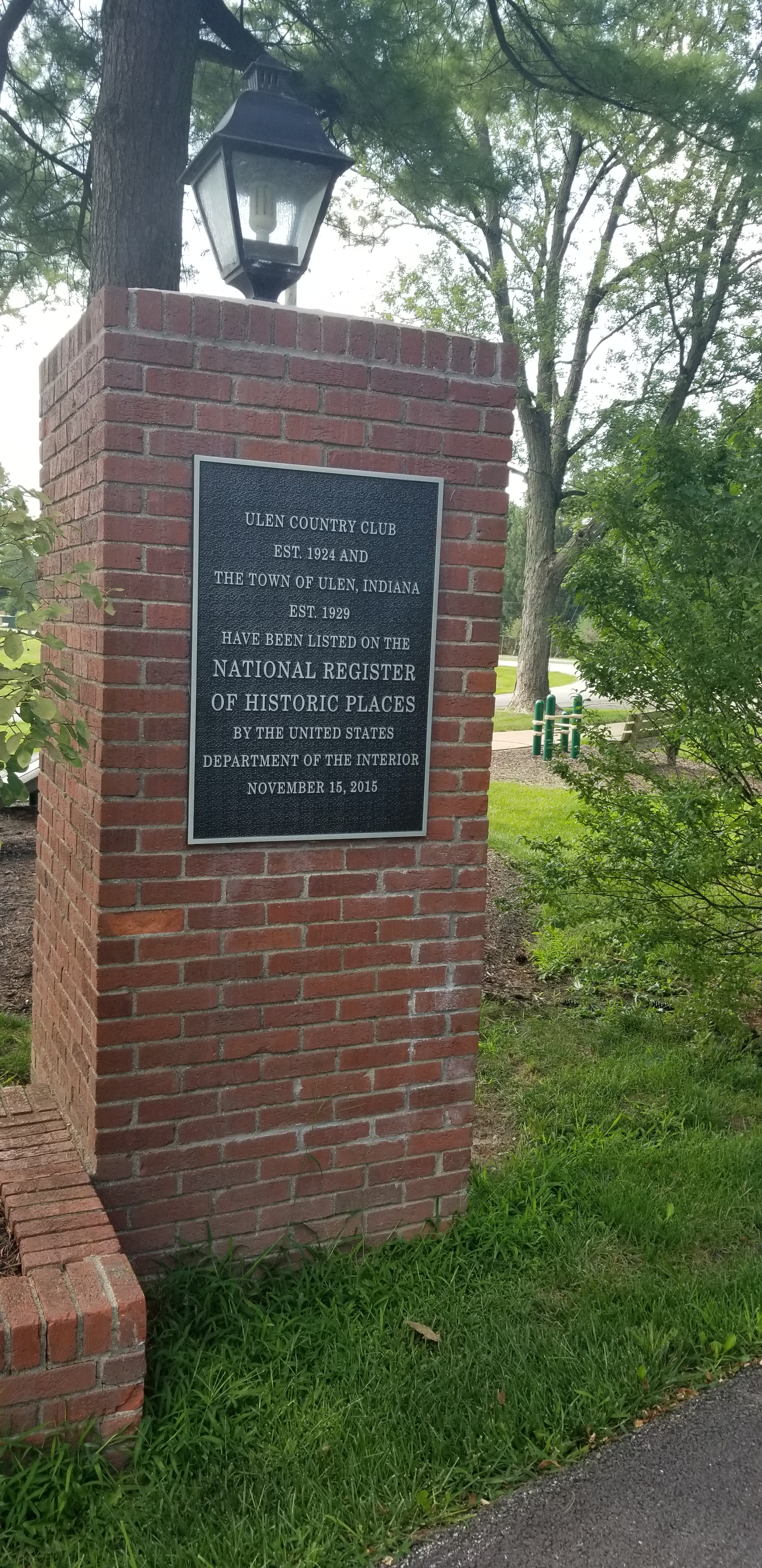
National Register of Historic Places plaque in Ulen, Indiana

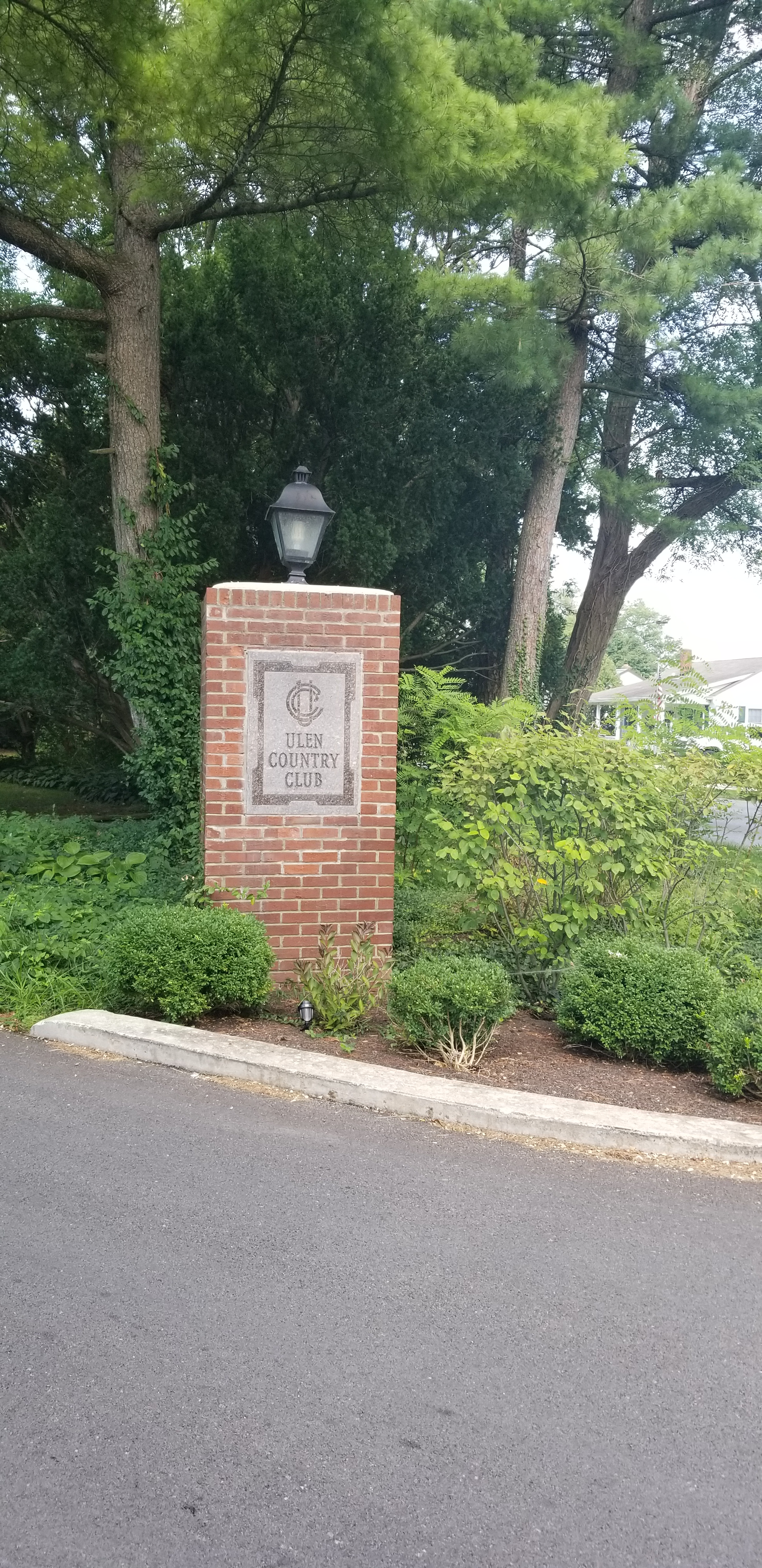
Plaque for Ulen Country Club

== See also ==
- List of cities surrounded by another city
