= AGC Inc. =

Japanese glass company

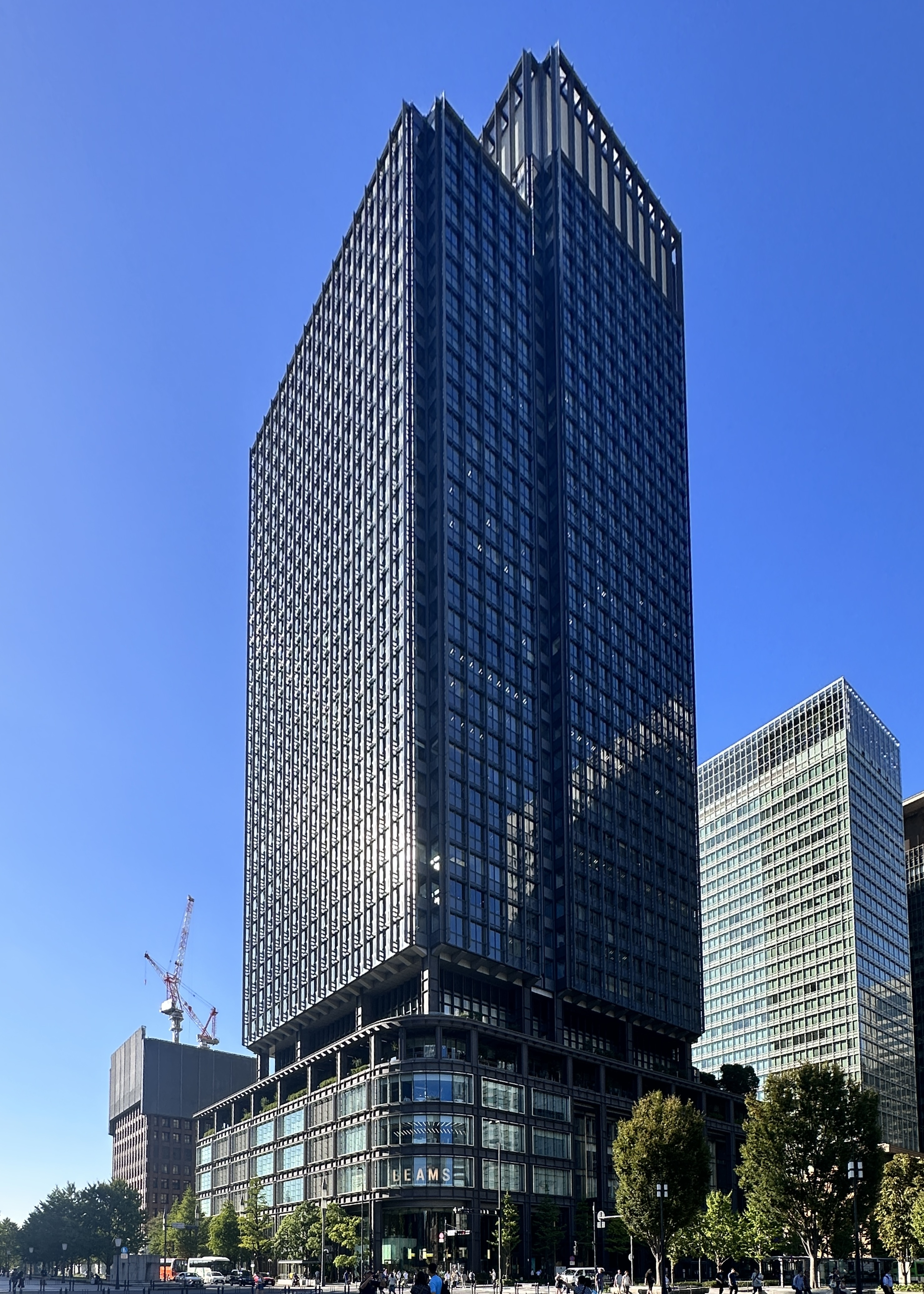
- Headquarters at Shin-Marunouchi Building in Marunouchi, Chiyoda, Tokyo
- Native name: AGC株式会社
- Romanized name: Eijīshī kabushiki gaisha
- Formerly: Asahi Glass Company, Ltd.
- Type: Public
- Traded as: TYO: 5201; Nikkei 225 Component
- Industry: Glass; Ceramics
- Founded: September 8, 1907; 119 years ago, in Amagasaki, Hyōgo, Japan
- Headquarters: Shin-Marunouchi Building, Marunouchi, Chiyoda-ku, Tokyo 100-8405, Japan
- Key people: Yoshinori Hirai (president and CEO)
- Products: Glass products; Ceramic products; Chemicals
- Revenue: ▼¥1,282.570 billion (2016)
- Operating income: ▲¥96.292 billion (2016)
- Net income: ▲¥53.362 billion (2016)
- Total assets: ▼¥1,981.451 billion (2016)
- Total equity: ▲¥1,168.743 billion) (2016)
- Owner: Mitsubishi Group
- Number of employees: 6,269 (non-consolidated); 51,500 (consolidated) (as of December 31, 2013)
- Subsidiaries: AGC Glass Europe; AGC America; AGC Automotive Glass Mexico; AGC Micro Glass; Asahi India Glass Limited
- Website: www.agc.com/english/index.html

AGC Inc. (AGC株式会社, AGC kabushiki gaisha), formerly Asahi Glass Co., Ltd. (Japanese: 旭硝子株式会社), is a Japanese global glass manufacturing company, headquartered in Tokyo. It is the largest glass company in the world and one of the core Mitsubishi companies.

The company is listed on the Tokyo Stock Exchange and is a constituent of the TOPIX and Nikkei 225 stock indices.

Asahi Glass was named one of Thomson Reuters Top 100 Global Innovators in 2013.

On July 1, 2018, it was renamed to AGC Inc.

== Overview ==
Asahi Glass was founded on 8 September 1907 by Toshiya Iwasaki, the second son of the second president of the original Mitsubishi zaibatsu. It was the first Japanese producer of sheet glass. Asahi Glass Co. is one of the largest flat glass producing companies in the world, owning Glaverbel glass plants across Europe and AFG Industries in North America. It purchased AFG Industries in 1992.

== Products ==
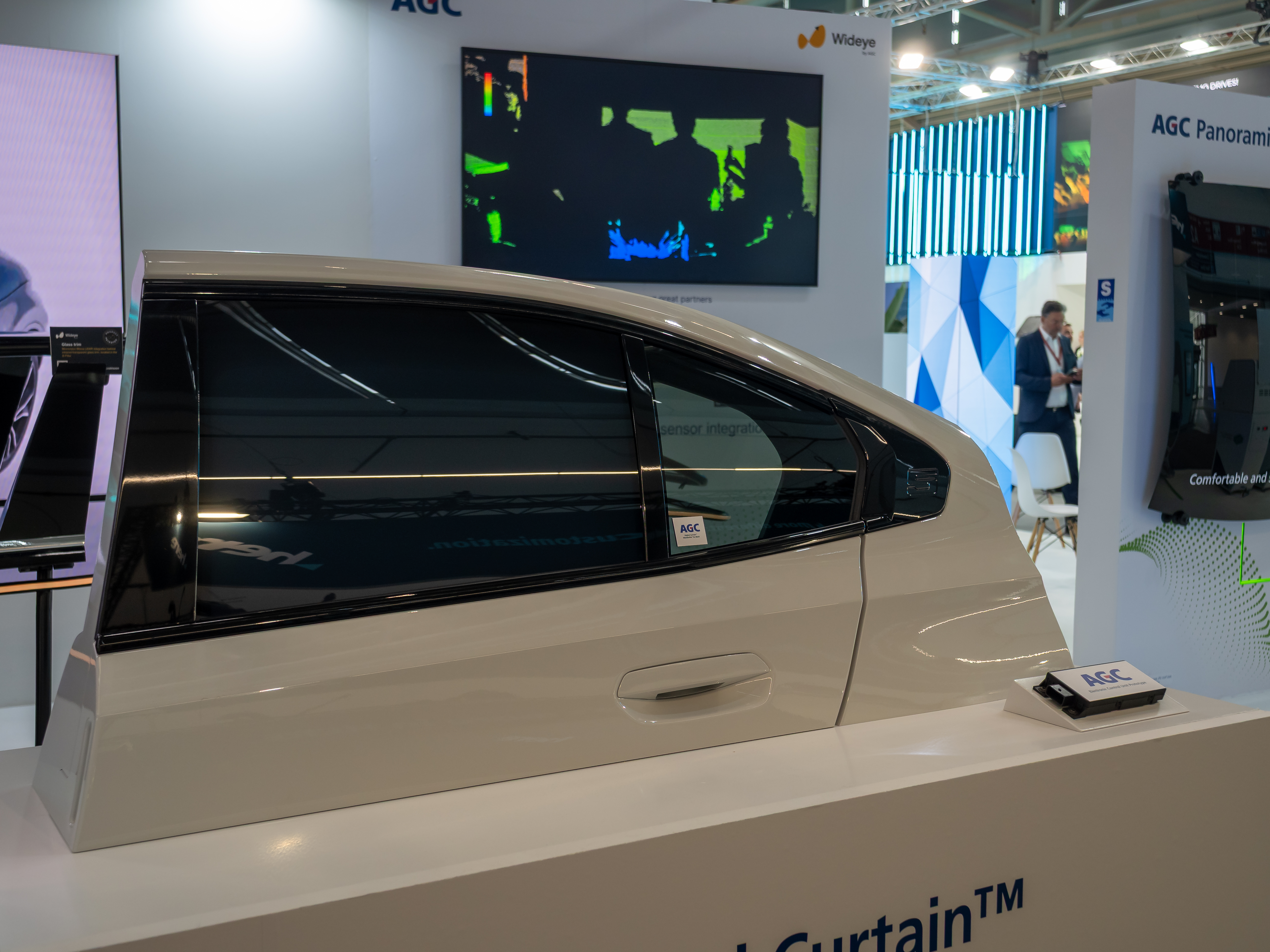
Electrochromic car window

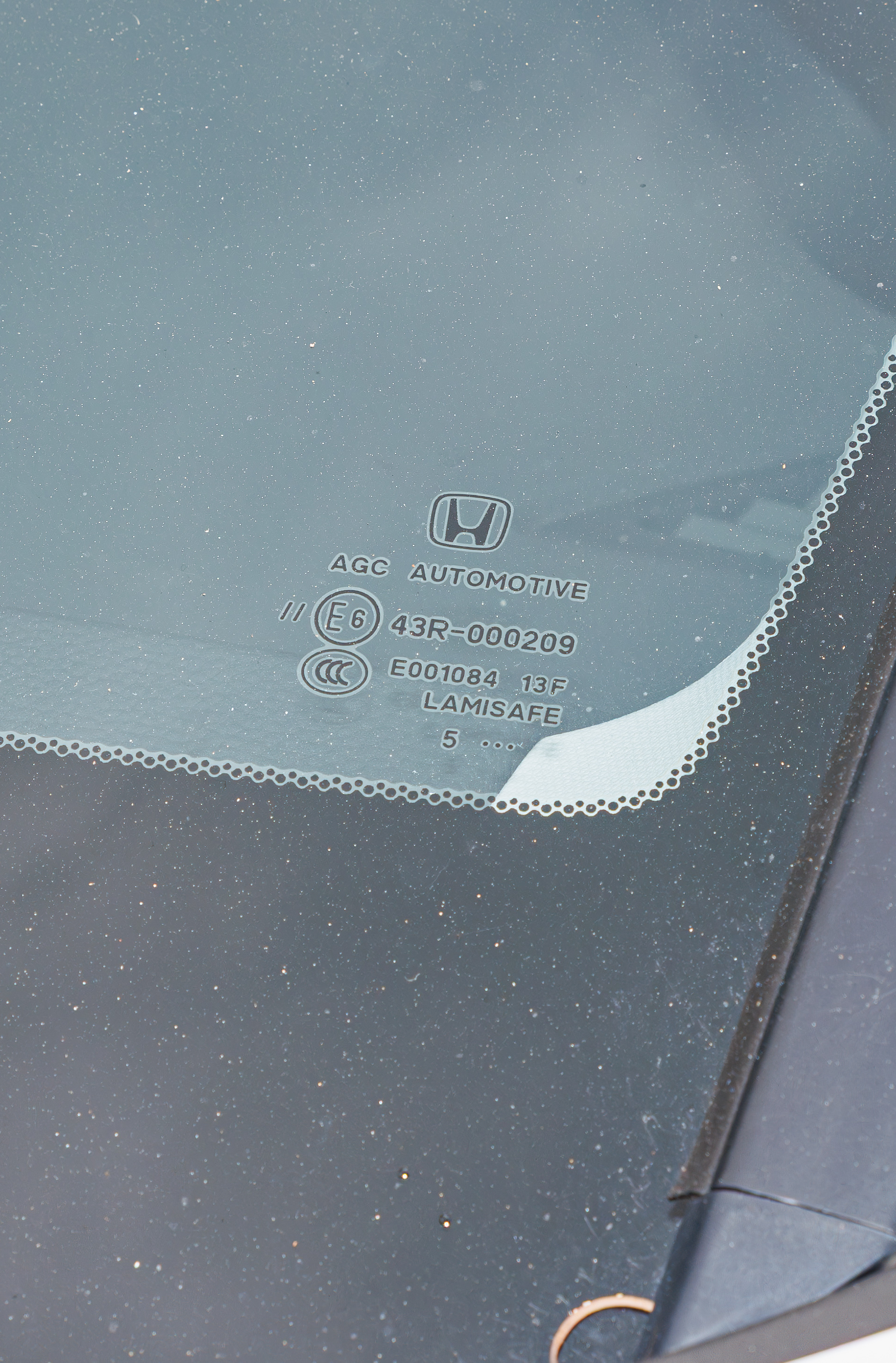
Honda CR-V (sixth generation) Windshield Manufactured by AGC Automotive

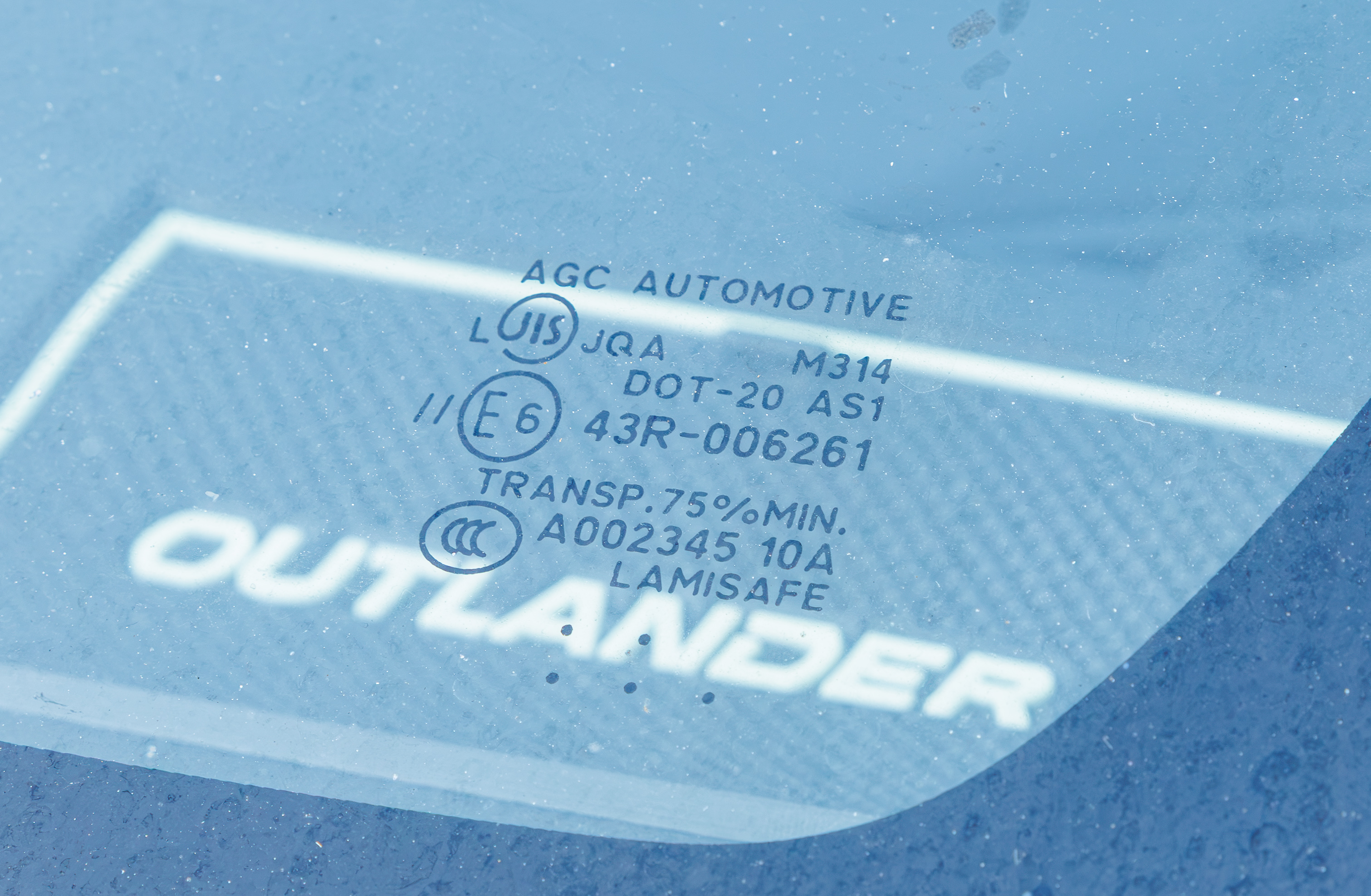
Mitsubishi Outlander (third generation) Windshield Manufactured by AGC Automotive

Its main areas of production are:

- Automotive glass and industrial material
- Bio-technology and environment
- Commodity and performance chemicals
  - Among performance chemicals, Asahi makes fluoropolymer films, including Fluon ETFE laminate, famous for its use as the external surface of the Allianz Arena football stadium, built in 2005, and the world's largest structure made out of ETFE.
- Display glass (including Dragontrail smartphone displays)
- Electronic materials and products
- Flat glass and construction material
- Optics and telecommunication

== Automotive glass ==
AGC is one of the world's largest producers of automotive glass, including windscreens, side and rear windows, and glass for vehicle displays. It also makes specialised windscreens for head-up displays and driver-assistance systems.

AGC has factories in Asia, Europe and the Americas. Its European plants include facilities in France, Italy, Hungary and the Czech Republic. The factory in Chudeřice, near Bílina, is the company's largest automotive glass plant in Europe, producing around 32 million pieces annually.

In 2025, AGC began building a new production line there to manufacture more than one million laminated windscreens per year.

== Subsidiaries and affiliates ==
- AGC Automotive
- AGC Biologics
- AGC Electronics America
- AGC Chemicals Americas
- AGC Chemicals Europe
- Asahi India Glass Limited (known as AIS)
- Asahi Fiber
- AGC Techno Glass thailand
- Ise Chemical Industries
- Optrex Corp.
- Asahi Glass Foundation
- AGC Glass Europe (formerly known as Glaverbel)
- AGC Asia Pacific Pte Ltd
- NordGlass Ltd., Poland
- AGC-CORP in Viet Nam

== Price-fixing scandal in Europe ==
AGC Flat Glass Europe was one of the four flat-glass manufacturers involved in the 2007, price fixing scandal uncovered by the EU Competition Commission. The European Commission said that the firms had raised or stabilised prices in 2004, and 2005, through illicit contacts. Neelie Kroes, the EU's competition commissioner, said that the EU would "not tolerate companies cheating consumers and business customers by fixing prices and depriving them of the benefits of the single market".

== Asahi India Glass Ltd (AIS) ==
Asahi India Glass Ltd. (AIS) was incorporated in the year 1984. The company was formed by a JV agreement between the Labroo family, Asahi Glass Co. Ltd. (AGC), Japan, and Maruti Suzuki India Ltd. It is the largest Automotive glass manufacturing company in India and manufactures a wide spectrum of glass products including automotive safety glass, float glass, and architectural processed glass. As of 2017, Asahi India Glass Ltd. has 77.1% market share in the passenger car glass segment in India.

=== SBUs & products ===
Asahi India Glass Ltd has 3 Strategic Business Units (SBUs) – Automotive Glass, Architectural Glass, and Consumer Glass. Asahi India Glass Ltd also manufactures uPVC, aluminium and wooden profile windows.

== PT Asahimas Flat Glass Tbk ==
(IDX: AMFG) is one of the largest automobile glass makers in Indonesia. In 1970s, Asahi Glass Co. Ltd. went into a joint venture with PT Rodamas, a merchant company turned consumer and industrial product manufacturer. Both established Asahimas Flat Glass in April 1973. It produced simple clear glass using the traditional Fourcault Process. Ownership (2014):

- Asahi Glass Co., Ltd. (43.86%)
- PT Rodamas (40.84%)
- Public (14.96%)
- Employee's Cooperative (0.36%)

== NordGlass (Poland) ==
One of the largest Polish manufacturers of windshields for the repair of passenger cars and trucks, working machines, railways, ships, construction and military (armored glass), NordGlass was acquired by AGC in 2015. 2 plants, in Koszalin and in Słupsk, with annual production exceeding one million panes, NordGlass employs over 1000 employees. NordGlass has a nationwide network of repair and replacement of car windows. The recipients of the main NordGlass product – windshields for motor vehicles, are the companies dealing with professional car glass replacement are all over Europe, as well as in South America (Brazil) and North Africa. Among them, a prominent position is held by Belron, the Belgian operator of Europe's largest international glass replacement network. NordGlass is one of the main windscreen suppliers for this customer.

In 2014, NordGlass manufactured the set of bulletproof windows for Cadillac 355D Fleetwood Special made in 1934, in the USA on the special order for Marshal Józef Piłsudski. The completion of the vehicle glazing constituted the essential part of the thorough vehicle renovation project. The original windows showed traces of bullets, most probably fired in the post-war period by the Communist Security Service officers who were testing the resistance of glass. It is currently possible to see the renovated vehicle in the Royal Baths Park (Polish: Łazienki Królewskie) in Warsaw.
